= Members of the Australian Senate, 2016–2019 =

- ←2014–2016 2019–2022→
- ) Composition (July 2016) Composition of the Senate Government (30); Coalition; Liberal (24) (Note: Three Liberal National Party of Queensland (LNP) senators sat in the Liberal party room.); National (6) (Note: Two Liberal National Party of Queensland (LNP) senators sat in the National party room.) (Note: Senator Nigel Scullion (Country Liberal) sat in the Nationals party room.) Opposition (26); Labor (26) Crossbench (20); Greens (9); One Nation (4); Centre Alliance (3); Family First (1); DHJP (1); Jacqui Lambie (1); Liberal Democratic (1) Composition (May 2019) Composition of the Senate Government (31); Coalition; Liberal (25) (Note: Three Liberal National Party of Queensland (LNP) senators sat in the Liberal party room.); National (6) (Note: Two Liberal National Party of Queensland (LNP) senators sat in the National party room.) (Note: Senator Nigel Scullion (Country Liberal) sat in the National party room.) Opposition (26); Labor (26) Crossbench (19); Greens (9); Centre Alliance (2); One Nation (2); DHJP (1); Conservatives (1); Liberal Democrat (1); Palmer United (1); Conservative National (1); Independent (1) (Note: The independent senator is Tim Storer (South Australia) who was expelled from the Nick Xenophon Team before he was declared elected by the High Court in place of Skye Kakoschke-Moore.)

This is a list of members of the Australian Senate following the 2016 Australian federal election held on 2 July 2016. The election was held as a consequence of a double dissolution in which both houses of parliament were dissolved. Ordinarily, only half of the senators terms end at each election. In this case, all 76 senators were elected. At the first sitting following the election, half of the senators representing each of the six states of Australia were allocated six-year terms to end on 30 June 2022, with the remainder allocated three-year terms to end on 30 June 2019. The terms of senators from the Australian Capital Territory and the Northern Territory end on the day of the next federal election.

In accordance with section 13 of the Constitution, it was left to the Senate to decide which senators were allocated six- and three-year terms. The senate resolved that the first elected six of twelve senators in each state would serve six-year terms, while the other six elected in each state would serve three-year terms. This had been the Senate practice on all seven previous occasions that required allocation of long and short terms. In 1983 the Joint Select Committee on Electoral Reform had unanimously recommended an alternative "recount" method to reflect proportional representation, and section 282 of the Commonwealth Electoral Act was added in 1984 to provide for a recount on that basis. This alternative method had been supported by both major parties in senate resolutions passed in 1998 and 2010. Despite the previous resolutions, an agreement between Liberal's Mathias Cormann and Labor's Penny Wong led the Senate to choose the order-elected method again. As a result, in New South Wales, Labor's Deborah O'Neill got a six-year term at the expense of The Greens' Lee Rhiannon getting a three-year term, while in Victoria Liberal's Scott Ryan got a six-year term at the expense of the Justice Party's Derryn Hinch getting a three-year term. Both methods of allocation had the same outcome for all other senators.

Senator	Party	State	Term ending	Years in office
Eric Abetz	Liberal	Tasmania	2022	1994–2022
Fraser Anning (Note: On 27 October 2017, the High Court of Australia ruled that Greens Senator Scott Ludlam, One Nation Senator Malcolm Roberts, Nationals Senator Fiona Nash and Greens Senator Larissa Waters were held to be "incapable of being chosen" as senators because they held foreign citizenship. The High Court had previously held that the presence of a person whose election was void did not invalidate the proceedings of the Senate. Their seats have been filled by a recount, which elected Jordon Steele-John, Fraser Anning and Andrew Bartlett, replacing Ludlam, Roberts and Waters respectively. Nash's replacement, Hollie Hughes, was referred to the full bench of the High Court, and was deemed ineligible under Section 44(iv). Jim Molan was elected on recount.)	One Nation/Katter's Australian Party/ Independent/Conservative National (Note: Fraser Anning was declared elected at a recount to replace Malcolm Roberts as a Senator for One Nation, but left the party within an hour of being sworn in on 13 November 2017.)	Queensland	2019	2017–2019
Wendy Askew (Note: On 21 January 2019, Tasmanian Liberal Senator David Bushby resigned from the Senate to take up the role of Australia's consul-general in Chicago. His sister Wendy Askew was appointed as his replacement on 6 March 2019.)	Liberal	Tasmania	2022 (Note: The term of some senators originally ended in 2019, but was extended to 2022 after resignations and recounts.)	2019–present
Chris Back (Note: Western Australian Liberal Senator Chris Back resigned on 31 July 2017. Slade Brockman was appointed as his replacement on 16 August 2017.)	Liberal	Western Australia	2019	2009–2017
Andrew Bartlett (Note: On 27 August 2018, Queensland Greens Senator Andrew Bartlett resigned from the Senate to contest the lower house Division of Brisbane. Larissa Waters was appointed as his replacement on 6 September 2018.)	Greens	Queensland	2019	1997–2008, 2017–2018
Cory Bernardi	Liberal/Conservatives/Independent (Note: On 7 February 2017, Senator for South Australia Cory Bernardi resigned from the Liberal Party and founded the Australian Conservatives. At the time of the 2019 Australian federal election, he was still the leader of said party. The party disbanded prior to the start of the following parliamentary term and Bernardi became an Independent member.)	South Australia	2022	2006–2020
Catryna Bilyk	Labor	Tasmania	2019	2008–2025
Simon Birmingham	Liberal	South Australia	2022	2007–2025
George Brandis (Note: Queensland LNP Senator George Brandis resigned on 8 February 2018. Amanda Stoker was appointed as his replacement on 21 March 2018.)	Liberal (Note: Three Liberal National Party of Queensland (LNP) senators sat in the Liberal party room.)	Queensland	2022	2000–2018
Slade Brockman	Liberal	Western Australia	2019	2017–present
Carol Brown	Labor	Tasmania	2019	2005–present
Brian Burston	One Nation/United Australia Party (Note: On 18 June 2018, Brian Burston joined Clive Palmer's United Australia Party.)	New South Wales	2019	2016–2019
David Bushby	Liberal	Tasmania	2022	2007–2019
Doug Cameron	Labor	New South Wales	2019	2008–2019
Matt Canavan	National (Note: Two Liberal National Party of Queensland (LNP) senators and one Country Liberal Party (CLP) senator sat in the Nationals party room. Nigel Scullion (CLP) was leader of the Nationals in the Senate.)	Queensland	2022	2014–present
Kim Carr	Labor	Victoria	2022	1993–2022
Michaelia Cash	Liberal	Western Australia	2022	2008–present
Anthony Chisholm	Labor	Queensland	2022	2016–present
Raff Ciccone (Note: On 15 February 2019, Victorian Labor Senator Jacinta Collins resigned from the Senate. Raff Ciccone was appointed as her replacement on 6 March 2019.)	Labor	Victoria	2019	2019–present
Richard Colbeck (Note: Tasmanian Liberal Senator and President of the Senate Stephen Parry resigned on 2 November 2017 from both positions after discovering he was a citizen of the United Kingdom, due to the recent High Court ruling that foreign citizens could not serve in parliament. Former Senator Richard Colbeck was declared duly elected by the High Court on 9 February 2018.)	Liberal	Tasmania	2019	2002–2016, 2018–present
Jacinta Collins	Labor	Victoria	2019	1995–2005, 2008–2019
Stephen Conroy (Note: Victorian Labor Senator Stephen Conroy resigned on 30 September 2016. Kimberley Kitching was appointed as his replacement on 25 October 2016.)	Labor	Victoria	2022	1996–2016
Mathias Cormann	Liberal	Western Australia	2022	2007–2020
Rod Culleton (Note: Western Australian Rod Culleton was declared bankrupt by the Federal Court of Australia on 11 January 2017, and as such was disqualified from being a Senator. The High Court subsequently held he was "incapable of being chosen" as a Senator as he was awaiting sentence on a criminal conviction. The High Court had previously held that the presence of a person whose election was void did not invalidate the proceedings of the Senate. Culleton's seat was filled by a recount, and on 10 March 2017 the High Court declared Peter Georgiou to be elected to the vacancy.)	One Nation/Independent (Note: Culleton resigned from the One Nation party on 18 December 2016.)	Western Australia	2019	2016–2017
Sam Dastyari (Note: Labor Senator Sam Dastyari resigned on 25 January 2018. Kristina Keneally was appointed as his replacement on 14 February 2018.)	Labor	New South Wales	2022	2013–2018
Bob Day (Note: South Australian Family First Senator Bob Day resigned on 1 November 2016. The High Court held on 5 April 2017 that Day was "incapable of being chosen" as a Senator as he had an indirect interest in an agreement with the Commonwealth. The High Court had previously held that the presence of a person whose election was void did not invalidate the proceedings of the Senate. Day's seat was filled by a recount, and Lucy Gichuhi was declared elected on 19 April 2017.)	Family First	South Australia	2019	2014–2016
Richard Di Natale	Greens	Victoria	2022	2011–2020
Pat Dodson	Labor	Western Australia	2019	2016–2024
Jonathon Duniam	Liberal	Tasmania	2022	2016–present
Don Farrell	Labor	South Australia	2022	2008–2014, 2016–present
Mehreen Faruqi (Note: Lee Rhiannon resigned from the Senate on 15 August 2018. Her seat was filled by former New South Wales Legislative Council member Mehreen Faruqi.)	Greens	New South Wales	2019	2018–present
David Fawcett	Liberal	South Australia	2019	2011–2025
Concetta Fierravanti-Wells	Liberal	New South Wales	2022	2005–2022
Mitch Fifield	Liberal	Victoria	2022	2004–2019
Alex Gallacher	Labor	South Australia	2019	2011–2021
Katy Gallagher (Note: On 9 May 2018, ACT Labor Senator Katy Gallagher was found by the High Court to be ineligible to be a senator. David Smith was elected in a special count as her replacement on 23 May 2018.)	Labor	Australian Capital Territory	2019 (Note: The terms of senators from the Australian Capital Territory and the Northern Territory end on the next dissolution of the House of Representatives.)	2015–2018, 2019–present
Peter Georgiou	One Nation	Western Australia	2019	2017–2019
Lucy Gichuhi	Family First/Independent/Liberal (Note: On 26 April 2017, Family First merged with the Australian Conservatives—with Lucy Gichuhi declining to join the new party, she became an independent.) (Note: On 2 February 2018 Lucy Gichuhi joined the Liberal Party.)	South Australia	2019	2017–2019
Stirling Griff	Xenophon/Centre Alliance	South Australia	2022	2016–2022
Pauline Hanson	One Nation	Queensland	2022	2016–present
Sarah Hanson-Young	Greens	South Australia	2019	2008–present
Derryn Hinch	Justice	Victoria	2019	2016–2019
Jane Hume	Liberal	Victoria	2019	2016–present
Skye Kakoschke-Moore (Note: South Australian NXT Senator Skye Kakoschke-Moore resigned on 22 November 2017 after discovering she was a citizen of the United Kingdom, due to the recent High Court ruling that foreign citizens could not serve in parliament. Tim Storer, an NXT candidate in 2016, was declared duly elected by the High Court on 9 February 2018. Storer was expelled from the party in November 2017, and sits as an independent.)	Xenophon	South Australia	2019	2016–2017
Kristina Keneally	Labor	New South Wales	2022	2018–2022
Chris Ketter	Labor	Queensland	2019	2014–2019
Kimberley Kitching	Labor	Victoria	2022	2016–2022
Jacqui Lambie (Note: Tasmanian JLN Senator Jacqui Lambie resigned on 14 November 2017 after discovering she was a citizen of the United Kingdom, due to the recent High Court ruling that foreign citizens could not serve in parliament. Steve Martin, a JLN candidate in 2016, was declared duly elected by the High Court on 9 February 2018, following a special count. Lambie had expelled Martin from the party on 7 February, so he initially sat as an independent.)	Lambie	Tasmania	2022	2014–2017, 2019–present
David Leyonhjelm (Note: On 1 March 2019, New South Wales Liberal Democrats Senator David Leyonhjelm resigned from the Senate to contest the New South Wales state election. Duncan Spender was appointed as his replacement on 20 March 2019.)	Liberal Democrats	New South Wales	2019	2014–2019
Sue Lines	Labor	Western Australia	2022	2013–present
Scott Ludlam (Note: Scott Ludlam resigned on 14 July 2017 after realising he held New Zealand citizenship, due to legal advice that he was ineligible to be a senator under Section 44 of the Constitution of Australia.)	Greens	Western Australia	2022	2008–2017
Ian Macdonald	Liberal	Queensland	2019	1990–2019
Gavin Marshall	Labor	Victoria	2019	2002–2019
Steve Martin , (Note: Steve Martin, formerly an independent Senator for Tasmania, joined the Nationals on 28 May 2018.)	Independent / National	Tasmania	2019	2018–2019
Jenny McAllister	Labor	New South Wales	2022	2015–present
Malarndirri McCarthy	Labor	Northern Territory	2019	2016–present
James McGrath	Liberal	Queensland	2022	2014–present
Bridget McKenzie	National	Victoria	2022	2011–present
Nick McKim	Greens	Tasmania	2019	2015–present
Jim Molan	Liberal	New South Wales	2019	2017–2019, 2019-2023
Claire Moore	Labor	Queensland	2019	2002–2019
Fiona Nash	National	New South Wales	2022	2005–2017
Deborah O'Neill	Labor	New South Wales	2022	2013–present
Barry O'Sullivan	National	Queensland	2019	2014–2019
Stephen Parry	Liberal	Tasmania	2022	2005–2017
James Paterson	Liberal	Victoria	2019	2016–present
Rex Patrick (Note: South Australian Senator and Nick Xenophon Team leader Nick Xenophon resigned from the Senate on 31 October 2017. Rex Patrick was appointed as his replacement on 14 November 2017.)	Xenophon/Centre Alliance	South Australia	2022	2017–2022
Marise Payne	Liberal	New South Wales	2022	1997–2023
Helen Polley	Labor	Tasmania	2022	2005–present
Louise Pratt	Labor	Western Australia	2019	2008–2014, 2016–2025
Linda Reynolds	Liberal	Western Australia	2019	2014–2025
Lee Rhiannon	Greens	New South Wales	2019	2011–2018
Janet Rice	Greens	Victoria	2019	2014–present
Malcolm Roberts	One Nation	Queensland	2019	2016–2017, 2019–present
Anne Ruston	Liberal	South Australia	2019	2012–present
Scott Ryan	Liberal	Victoria	2022	2008–2021
Nigel Scullion	National	Northern Territory	2019	2001–2019
Zed Seselja	Liberal	Australian Capital Territory	2019	2013–2022
Rachel Siewert	Greens	Western Australia	2022	2005–2021
Lisa Singh	Labor	Tasmania	2019	2011–2019
Arthur Sinodinos	Liberal	New South Wales	2022	2011–2019
David Smith (Note: David Smith resigned on 11 April 2019 to contest the lower house Division of Bean.)	Labor	Australian Capital Territory	2019	2018–2019
Dean Smith	Liberal	Western Australia	2022	2012–present
Duncan Spender	Liberal Democrats	New South Wales	2019	2019
Jordon Steele-John	Greens	Western Australia	2019	2017–present
Glenn Sterle	Labor	Western Australia	2022	2005–present
Amanda Stoker	Liberal	Queensland	2022	2018–2022
Tim Storer	Independent	South Australia	2019	2018–2019
Anne Urquhart	Labor	Tasmania	2022	2011–present
Larissa Waters (Note: Larissa Waters resigned on 18 July 2017 after realising she held Canadian citizenship, due to legal advice that she was ineligible to be a senator under Section 44 of the Constitution of Australia.)	Greens	Queensland	2019	2011–2017, 2018–present
Murray Watt	Labor	Queensland	2022	2016–present
Peter Whish-Wilson	Greens	Tasmania	2022	2012–present
John Williams	National	New South Wales	2019	2008–2019
Penny Wong	Labor	South Australia	2022	2002–present
Nick Xenophon	Xenophon	South Australia	2022	2008–2017
