= Results of the 2022 Australian federal election in South Australia =

Federal election results in South Australia

2022 Australian federal election (South Australia)
- 21 May 2022

All 10 South Australian seats in the Australian House of Representatives and 6 seats in the Australian Senate
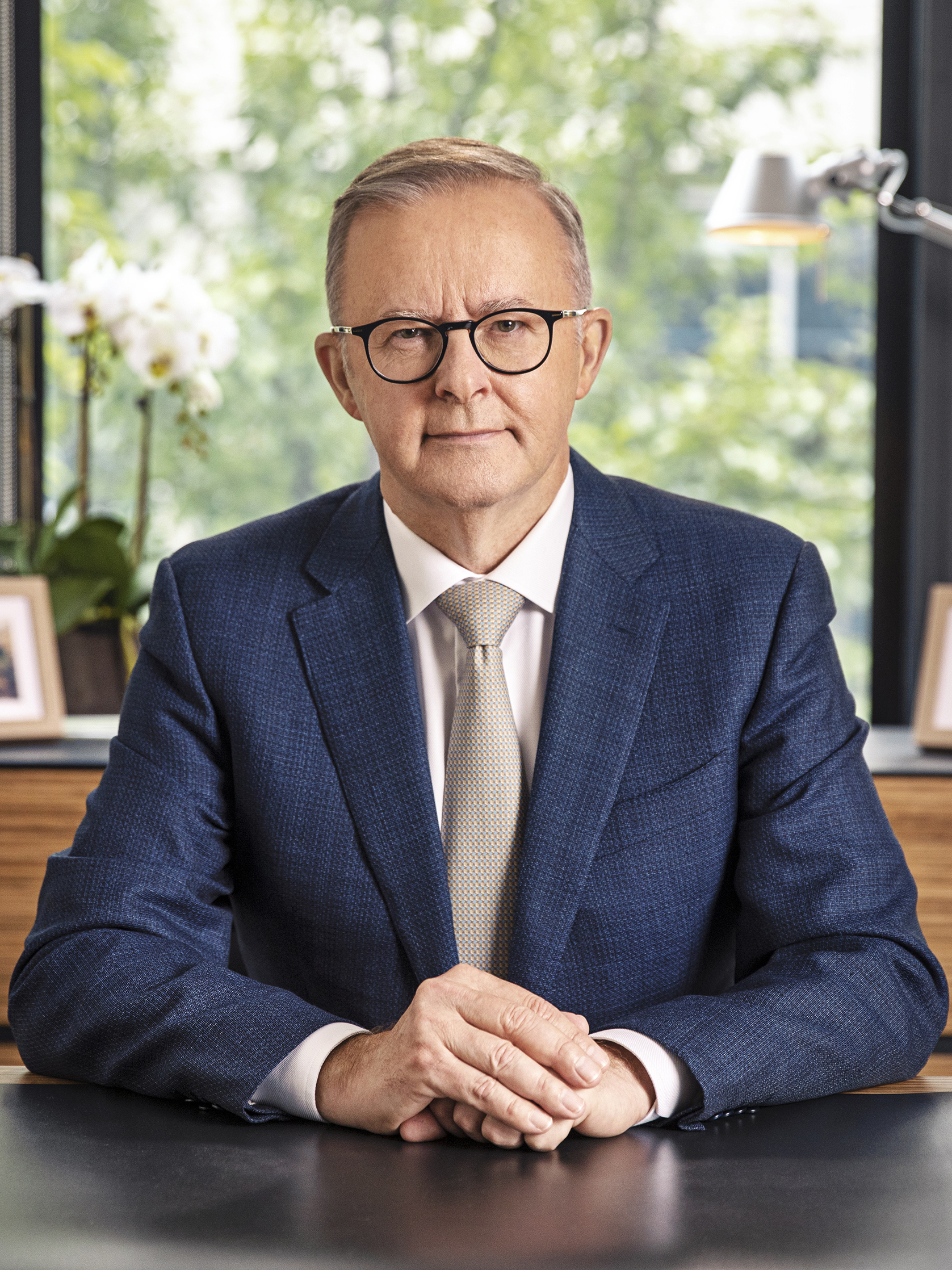

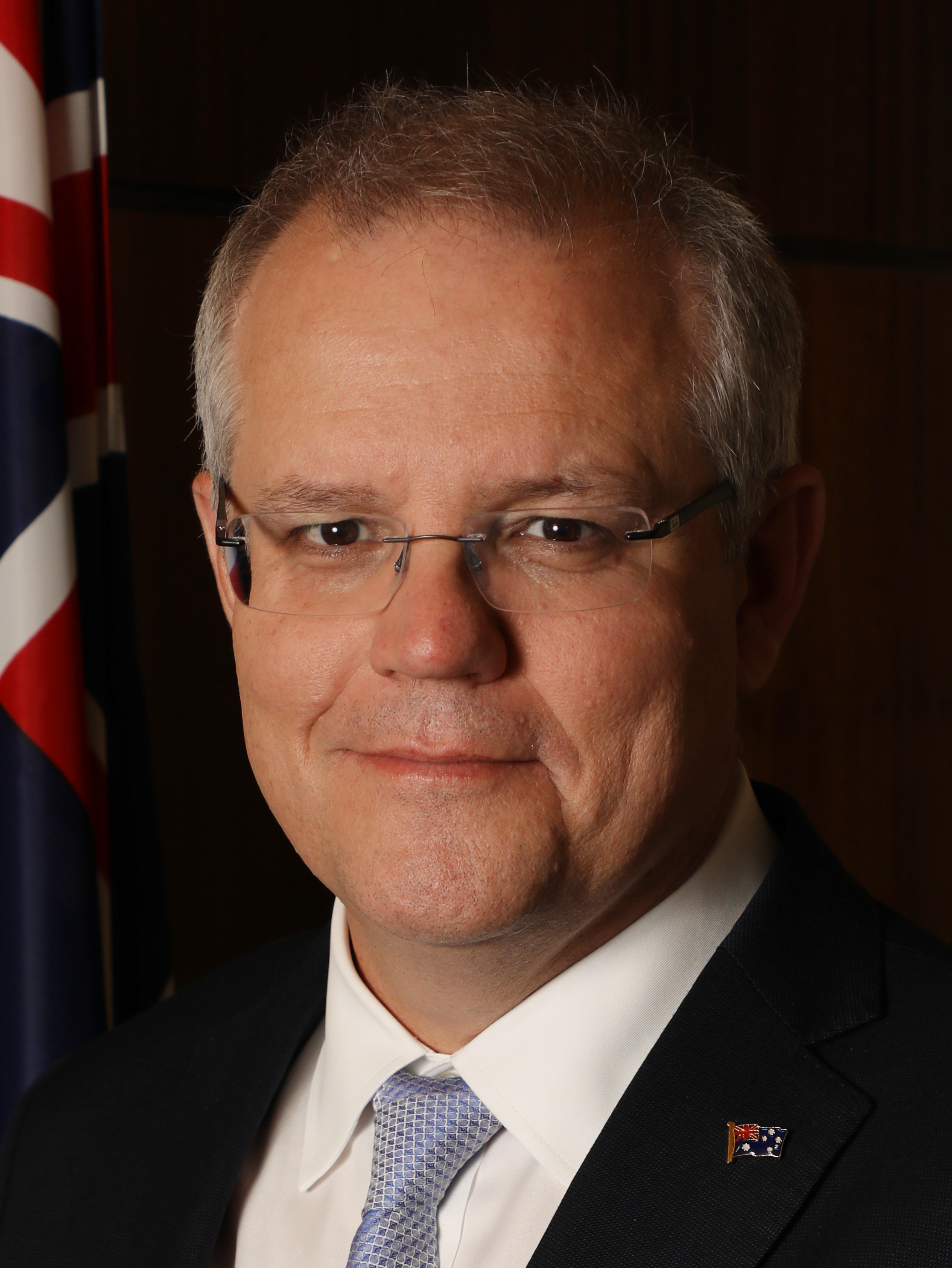

	First party	Second party	Third party
Leader	Anthony Albanese	Scott Morrison	No leader
Party	Labor	Liberal/National coalition	Centre Alliance
Last election	5 seats	4 seats	1 seat
Seats won	6	3	1
Seat change	▲1	▼1	Steady
Primary vote	378,329	390,195	36,500
Percentage	34.46%	35.54%	3.32%
Swing	▼0.92	▼5.29	▼1.06
TPP	53.97%	46.03%
TPP swing	▲3.26	▼3.26
- Results by division for the House of Representatives, shaded by winning party's margin of victory.

This is a list of electoral division results for the 2022 Australian federal election in the state of South Australia.

This election was held using instant-runoff voting. In South Australia in this election, there was one "turn-over". In Boothby, a Labor candidate who did not lead in the first count took the seat in the end.

== Overall results ==
House of Representatives (IRV) – Turnout 91.07% (CV)
Party	Votes	%	Swing	Seats	Change
Liberal/National Coalition
Liberal Party of Australia	387,664	35.31	–5.26	3	▼1
National Party of Australia	2,531	0.23	–0.03	0	Steady
Liberal/National Coalition	390,195	35.54	−5.29	3	▼1
Australian Labor Party	378,329	34.46	–0.92	6	▲1
Australian Greens	140,227	12.77	+3.16	0	Steady
Pauline Hanson's One Nation	53,057	4.83	+3.99	0	Steady
United Australia Party	42,688	3.89	–0.40	0	Steady
Centre Alliance	36,500	3.32	–1.06	1	Steady
Australian Federation Party	10,354	0.94	+0.94	0	Steady
Animal Justice Party	7,158	0.65	–2.13	0	Steady
Liberal Democratic Party	5,248	0.48	+0.48	0	Steady
Fusion	1,631	0.15	+0.15	0	Steady
The Great Australian Party	1,184	0.11	+0.11	0	Steady
Drew Pavlou Democratic Alliance	1,007	0.09	+0.09	0	Steady
Australian Progressives	457	0.04	–0.01	0	Steady
TNL	251	0.02	+0.02	0	Steady
Independents	29,500	2.69	+1.48	0	Steady
Total	1,097,786			10	
Invalid/blank votes	59,222	5.12	+0.31	–	–
Turnout	1,157,008	91.07	–2.00	–	–
Registered voters	1,270,400	–	–	–	–
Two-party-preferred vote
Labor	592,512	53.97	+3.26	–	–
Liberal	505,274	46.03	–3.26	–	–
Source: AEC for both votes and seats

== Results by division ==
=== Adelaide ===
2022 Australian federal election: Adelaide
Party	Candidate	Votes	%	±%
Labor	Steve Georganas	45,086	39.98	−0.29
Liberal	Amy Grantham	36,080	32.00	−4.16
Greens	Rebecca Galdies	22,666	20.10	+4.38
One Nation	Gayle Allwood	3,376	2.99	+2.99
United Australia	Sean Allwood	3,055	2.71	−0.54
Fusion	Matthew McMillan	1,631	1.45	+1.45
Federation	Faith Gerhard	870	0.77	+0.77
Total formal votes		112,764	96.21	−0.09
Informal votes		4,438	3.79	+0.09
Turnout		117,202	90.18	−1.34
Two-party-preferred result
Labor	Steve Georganas	69,816	61.91	+3.73
Liberal	Amy Grantham	42,948	38.09	−3.73
Labor hold		Swing	+3.73	

Alluvial diagram for preference flows in the seat of Adelaide in the 2022 federal election. indicates at what stage the winning candidate had over 50% of the votes and was declared the winner.

=== Barker ===
2022 Australian federal election: Barker
Party	Candidate	Votes	%	±%
Liberal	Tony Pasin	56,330	53.24	−4.64
Labor	Mark Braes	22,054	20.85	−0.16
Greens	Rosa Hillam	7,841	7.41	+0.57
One Nation	Carlos Quaremba	6,958	6.58	+6.58
United Australia	David Swiggs	4,222	3.99	−1.93
Independent	Maddy Fry	3,190	3.02	+3.02
National	Jonathan Pietzsch	2,531	2.39	−0.26
Independent	Vince Pannell	1,913	1.81	+1.81
Federation	Kym Hanton	760	0.72	+0.72
Total formal votes		105,799	93.04	−1.39
Informal votes		7,909	6.96	+1.39
Turnout		113,708	92.20	−2.33
Two-party-preferred result
Liberal	Tony Pasin	70,483	66.62	−2.32
Labor	Mark Braes	35,316	33.38	+2.32
Liberal hold		Swing	−2.32	

Alluvial diagram for preference flows in the seat of Barker in the 2022 federal election. The winning candidate got over 50% of first preference votes, so this alluvial diagram is indicative only, and preference flows were not used to determine the final result. The preference flows were used to determine the two-candidate-preferred.

=== Boothby ===
2022 Australian federal election: Boothby
Party	Candidate	Votes	%	±%
Liberal	Rachel Swift	43,196	37.99	−7.20
Labor	Louise Miller-Frost	36,746	32.32	−2.31
Greens	Jeremy Carter	17,285	15.20	+3.24
Independent	Jo Dyer	7,441	6.54	+6.54
United Australia	Graeme Clark	2,520	2.22	+0.33
One Nation	Bob Couch	2,320	2.04	+2.04
Animal Justice	Frankie Bray	1,358	1.19	−1.23
Liberal Democrats	Aleksandra Nikolic	1,250	1.10	+1.10
Independent	Paul Busuttil	1,048	0.92	+0.92
Federation	Peter Harris	543	0.48	+0.48
Total formal votes		113,707	95.56	+0.26
Informal votes		5,289	4.44	−0.26
Turnout		118,996	92.54	−1.07
Two-party-preferred result
Labor	Louise Miller-Frost	60,579	53.28	+4.66
Liberal	Rachel Swift	53,128	46.72	−4.66
Labor gain from Liberal		Swing	+4.66	

Alluvial diagram for preference flows in the seat of Boothby in the 2022 federal election. indicates at what stage the winning candidate had over 50% of the votes and was declared the winner.

=== Grey ===
2022 Australian federal election: Grey
Party	Candidate	Votes	%	±%
Liberal	Rowan Ramsey	46,730	45.32	−5.33
Labor	Julie Watson	22,068	21.40	−1.43
Independent	Liz Habermann	11,613	11.26	+11.26
Greens	Tim White	6,994	6.78	+2.18
One Nation	Kerry Ann White	6,452	6.26	−2.43
United Australia	Suzanne Waters	5,781	5.61	+1.85
Liberal Democrats	Peter Miller	1,427	1.38	+1.38
Independent	Richard Carmody	1,332	1.29	−0.45
Federation	Tracey Dempsey	721	0.70	+0.70
Total formal votes		103,118	93.07	−0.02
Informal votes		7,674	6.93	+0.02
Turnout		110,792	89.62	−3.03
Two-party-preferred result
Liberal	Rowan Ramsey	61,938	60.07	−3.25
Labor	Julie Watson	41,180	39.93	+3.25
Liberal hold		Swing	−3.25	

Alluvial diagram for preference flows in the seat of Grey in the 2022 federal election. indicates at what stage the winning candidate had over 50% of the votes and was declared the winner.

=== Hindmarsh ===
2022 Australian federal election: Hindmarsh
Party	Candidate	Votes	%	±%
Labor	Mark Butler	46,547	42.18	−0.91
Liberal	Anna Finizio	36,072	32.69	−4.06
Greens	Patrick O'Sullivan	15,310	13.87	+2.89
One Nation	Walter Johnson	4,341	3.93	+3.93
United Australia	George Melissourgos	3,896	3.53	−0.81
Animal Justice	Matt Pastro	2,340	2.12	−0.83
Great Australian	Jamie Witt	1,184	1.07	+1.07
Federation	Dianne Richards	653	0.59	+0.59
Total formal votes		110,343	94.29	−1.39
Informal votes		6,686	5.71	+1.39
Turnout		117,029	90.98	−1.87
Two-party-preferred result
Labor	Mark Butler	65,043	58.95	+2.41
Liberal	Anna Finizio	45,300	41.05	−2.41
Labor hold		Swing	+2.41	

Alluvial diagram for preference flows in the seat of Hindmarsh in the 2022 federal election. indicates at what stage the winning candidate had over 50% of the votes and was declared the winner.

=== Kingston ===
2022 Australian federal election: Kingston
Party	Candidate	Votes	%	±%
Labor	Amanda Rishworth	53,810	49.20	−1.38
Liberal	Kathleen Bourne	28,273	25.85	−5.87
Greens	John Photakis	13,603	12.44	+3.24
One Nation	Robert Godfrey-Brown	5,313	4.86	+4.86
United Australia	Russell Jackson	4,321	3.95	−1.02
Independent	Rob De Jonge	2,963	2.71	+2.71
Federation	Sam Enright	1,079	0.99	+0.99
Total formal votes		109,362	96.19	+0.30
Informal votes		4,336	3.81	−0.30
Turnout		113,698	91.37	−1.80
Two-party-preferred result
Labor	Amanda Rishworth	72,564	66.35	+4.41
Liberal	Kathleen Bourne	36,798	33.65	−4.41
Labor hold		Swing	+4.41	

Alluvial diagram for preference flows in the seat of Kingston in the 2022 federal election. indicates at what stage the winning candidate had over 50% of the votes and was declared the winner.

=== Makin ===
2022 Australian federal election: Makin
Party	Candidate	Votes	%	±%
Labor	Tony Zappia	49,843	46.30	−2.12
Liberal	Alan Howard-Jones	33,840	31.44	−1.44
Greens	Emma Mustaca	12,317	11.44	+2.81
One Nation	Rajan Vaid	5,097	4.74	+4.74
United Australia	Kimberley Drozdoff	4,638	4.31	−2.13
Federation	Abram Lazootin	1,907	1.77	+1.77
Total formal votes		107,642	95.87	+0.36
Informal votes		4,639	4.13	−0.36
Turnout		112,281	91.20	−1.92
Two-party-preferred result
Labor	Tony Zappia	65,444	60.80	+1.08
Liberal	Alan Howard-Jones	42,198	39.20	−1.08
Labor hold		Swing	+1.08	

Alluvial diagram for preference flows in the seat of Makin in the 2022 federal election. indicates at what stage the winning candidate had over 50% of the votes and was declared the winner.

=== Mayo ===
2022 Australian federal election: Mayo
Party	Candidate	Votes	%	±%
Centre Alliance	Rebekha Sharkie	36,500	31.41	−2.78
Liberal	Allison Bluck	31,411	27.03	−10.62
Labor	Marisa Bell	21,051	18.11	+4.45
Greens	Greg Elliott	13,705	11.79	+2.53
One Nation	Tonya Scott	4,775	4.11	+4.11
United Australia	Samantha McGrail	4,089	3.52	+0.33
Animal Justice	Padma Chaplin	1,929	1.66	−0.38
Liberal Democrats	Jacob van Raalte	1,424	1.23	+1.23
Federation	Mark Neugebauer	1,330	1.14	+1.14
Total formal votes		116,214	94.95	−2.00
Informal votes		6,176	5.05	+2.00
Turnout		122,390	93.68	−1.29
Notional two-party-preferred count
Labor	Marisa Bell	59,955	51.59	+4.13
Liberal	Allison Bluck	56,259	48.41	−4.13
Two-candidate-preferred result
Centre Alliance	Rebekha Sharkie	72,355	62.26	+7.12
Liberal	Allison Bluck	43,859	37.74	−7.12
Centre Alliance hold		Swing	+7.12	

Alluvial diagram for preference flows in the seat of Mayo in the 2022 federal election. indicates at what stage the winning candidate had over 50% of the votes and was declared the winner.

=== Spence ===
2022 Australian federal election: Spence
Party	Candidate	Votes	%	±%
Labor	Matt Burnell	46,596	43.86	−7.10
Liberal	Shawn Lock	27,153	25.56	−0.27
Greens	David Deex	12,052	11.35	+4.14
One Nation	Linda Champion	11,532	10.86	+10.86
United Australia	Alvin Warren	7,158	6.74	−0.30
Federation	Matilda Bawden	1,736	1.63	+1.63
Total formal votes		106,227	95.05	+1.03
Informal votes		5,534	4.95	−1.03
Turnout		111,761	86.57	−3.97
Two-party-preferred result
Labor	Matt Burnell	66,818	62.90	−1.23
Liberal	Shawn Lock	39,409	37.10	+1.23
Labor hold		Swing	−1.23	

Alluvial diagram for preference flows in the seat of Spence in the 2022 federal election. indicates at what stage the winning candidate had over 50% of the votes and was declared the winner.

=== Sturt ===
2022 Australian federal election: Sturt
Party	Candidate	Votes	%	±%
Liberal	James Stevens	48,579	43.14	−7.43
Labor	Sonja Baram	34,528	30.66	+0.80
Greens	Katie McCusker	18,454	16.39	+5.21
United Australia	Stephen Grant	3,008	2.67	+0.25
One Nation	Alexander Allwood	2,893	2.57	+2.57
Animal Justice	David Sherlock	1,531	1.36	−0.34
Liberal Democrats	Thomas McMahon	1,147	1.02	+1.02
Democratic Alliance	Inty Elham	1,007	0.89	+0.89
Federation	Kathy Scarborough	755	0.67	+0.67
Progressives	Angela Fulco	457	0.41	−0.10
TNL	Chris Schmidt	251	0.22	+0.22
Total formal votes		112,610	94.51	−0.12
Informal votes		6,541	5.49	+0.12
Turnout		119,151	92.38	−1.27
Two-party-preferred result
Liberal	James Stevens	56,813	50.45	−6.42
Labor	Sonja Baram	55,797	49.55	+6.42
Liberal hold		Swing	−6.42	

Alluvial diagram for preference flows in the seat of Sturt in the 2022 federal election. indicates at what stage the winning candidate had over 50% of the votes and was declared the winner.
