= Results of the 2025 Australian federal election in South Australia =

Federal election results in South Australia

2025 Australian federal election (South Australia)
- 3 May 2025

All 10 South Australian seats in the Australian House of Representatives 6 of 12 South Australian seats in the Australian Senate
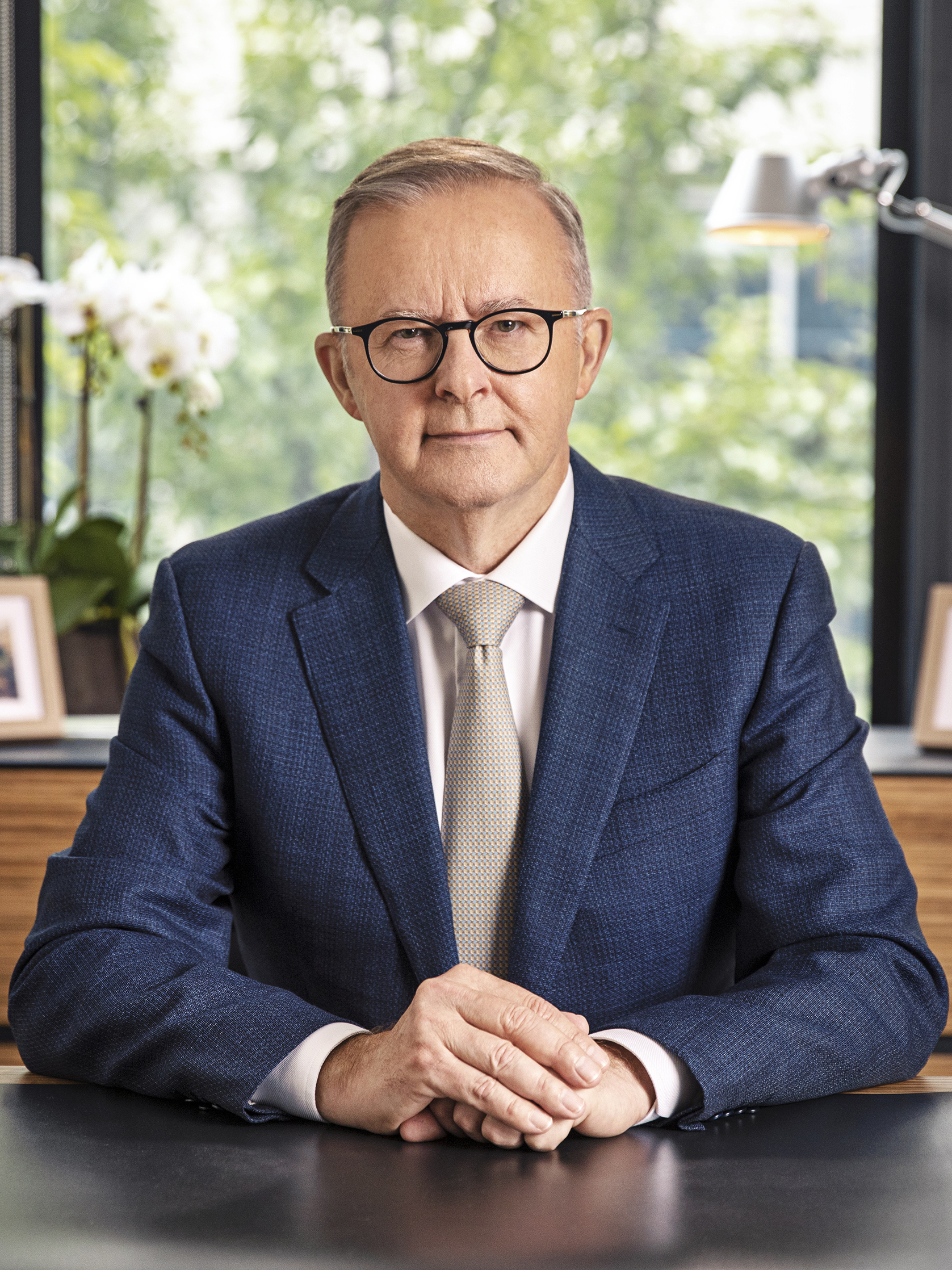

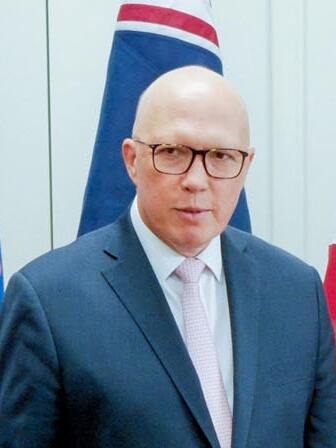

	First party	Second party	Third party
Leader	Anthony Albanese	Peter Dutton	No leader
Party	Labor	Liberal	Centre Alliance
Last election	6 seats	3 seats	1 seat
Seats won	7	2	1
Seat change	▲1	▼1	Steady
Popular vote	433,738	316,915	37,453
Percentage	38.31%	27.99%	3.31%
Swing	▲3.85	▼7.32	▼0.01
TPP	59.20%	40.80%
TPP swing	▲5.23 pp	▼5.23 pp
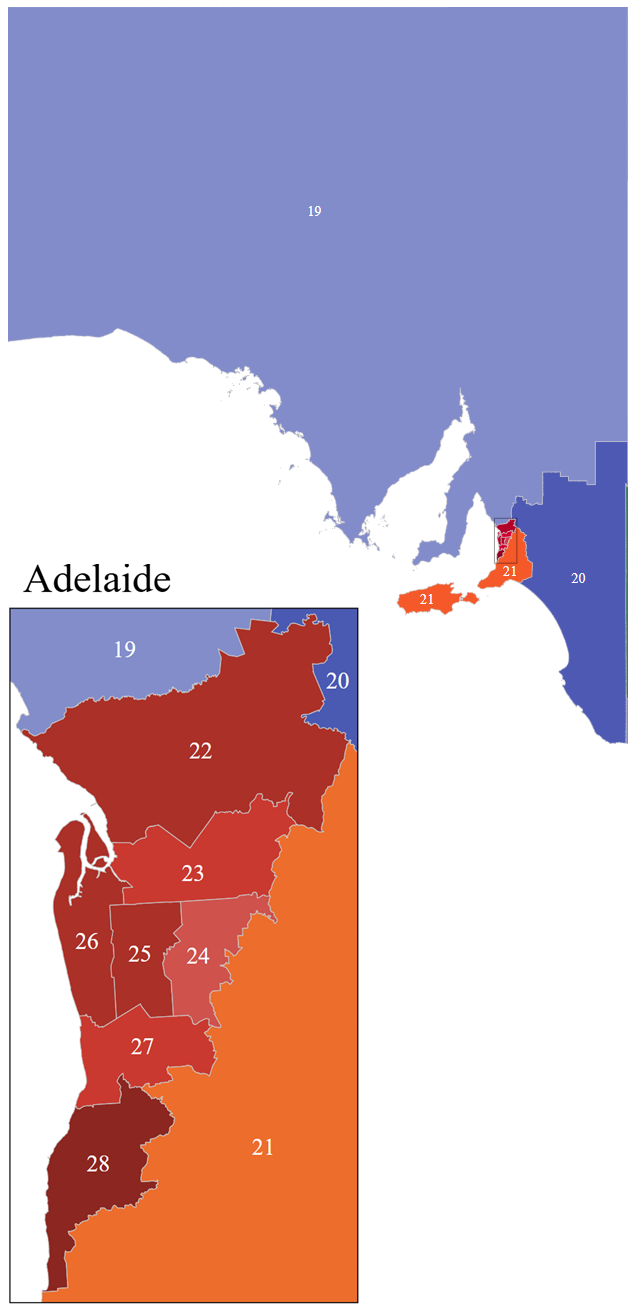
- Results by South Australian division for the House of Representatives.

This is a list of electoral division results for the 2025 Australian federal election in the state of South Australia.

This election was held using instant-runoff voting. All seats saw swings towards Labor, with the seat of Sturt being the only one to change hands. Previously a marginal Liberal seat, Claire Clutterham was elected to the seat with a 7.1 per cent swing.

With Labor gaining Sturt from the Liberal Party, the Liberals lost their last seat in Adelaide. All seats in Adelaide are now held by Labor and Centre Alliance. Labor polled 59.2% of the two-party preferred vote in South Australia, the party’s best ever result in the state.

== Overall results ==
House of Representatives (IRV) – Turnout 91.47% (CV)
Party	Votes	%	Swing (pp)	Seats	Change (seats)
Labor	433,738	38.31	+3.85	7	▲1
Liberal	316,915	27.99	–7.32	2	▼1
Greens	151,915	13.42	+0.65	0	Steady
One Nation	69,650	6.15	+1.32	0	Steady
Centre Alliance	37,453	3.31	–0.01	1	Steady
Trumpet of Patriots	35,793	3.16	+2.22	0	Steady
Family First	29,293	2.59	+2.59	0	Steady
Animal Justice	11,228	0.99	+0.34	0	Steady
Nationals SA	5,181	0.46	+0.23	0	Steady
Fusion	3,009	0.27	+0.12	0	Steady
Independent	38,063	3.36	+0.67	0	Steady
Total	1,132,238	100.00		10	Steady
Invalid/blank votes	62,907	5.26	+0.14	–	–
Turnout	1,195,145	91.47	+0.39	–	–
Registered voters	1,306,665	–	–	–	–
Two-party-preferred vote
Labor	670,248	59.20	+5.23	7	▲1
Liberal	461,990	40.80	–5.23	2	▼1
Source: AEC

== Results by division ==
=== Adelaide ===
2025 Australian federal election: Adelaide
Party	Candidate	Votes	%	±%
Labor	Steve Georganas	53,036	46.49	+6.51
Liberal	Amy Grantham	27,571	24.17	−7.83
Greens	Mat Monti	21,642	18.97	−1.13
One Nation	Riley Size	4,584	4.02	+1.03
Trumpet of Patriots	Steve Marks	3,144	2.76	+1.99
Animal Justice	Lionel Pengilley	2,745	2.41	+2.41
Fusion	Matthew McMillan	1,367	1.20	−0.25
Total formal votes		114,089	96.22	+0.01
Informal votes		4,478	3.78	−0.01
Turnout		118,567	90.21	+0.03
Two-party-preferred result
Labor	Steve Georganas	78,796	69.07	+7.16
Liberal	Amy Grantham	35,293	30.93	−7.16
Labor hold		Swing	+7.16	

Alluvial diagram illustrating the full distribution of preferences in the seat of Adelaide for the 2025 Federal Election

=== Barker ===
2025 Australian federal election: Barker
Party	Candidate	Votes	%	±%
Liberal	Tony Pasin	52,460	48.26	−4.98
Labor	James Rothe	24,453	22.49	+1.64
One Nation	Jennifer Troeth	8,908	8.19	+1.61
Greens	Major Moogy Sumner	8,866	8.16	+0.75
Trumpet of Patriots	Robert Jameson	2,983	2.74	+2.02
Independent	Cody Scholes	2,963	2.73	+2.73
Family First	Michael Brohier	2,781	2.56	+2.56
National	Jonathan Pietzsch	1,893	1.74	−0.65
Independent	Rosa Hillam	1,891	1.74	+1.74
Independent	Ian Penno	1,516	1.39	+1.39
Total formal votes		108,714	92.41	−0.63
Informal votes		8,934	7.59	+0.63
Turnout		117,648	92.60	+0.40
Two-party-preferred result
Liberal	Tony Pasin	68,465	62.98	−3.64
Labor	James Rothe	40,249	37.02	+3.64
Liberal hold		Swing	−3.64	

Alluvial diagram illustrating the full distribution of preferences in the seat of Barker for the 2025 Federal Election

=== Boothby ===
2025 Australian federal election: Boothby
Party	Candidate	Votes	%	±%
Labor	Louise Miller-Frost	50,015	42.62	+10.30
Liberal	Nicolle Flint	38,117	32.48	−5.51
Greens	Joanna Wells	20,046	17.08	+1.88
One Nation	Tonya Scott	3,560	3.03	+0.99
Trumpet of Patriots	Nicole Hussey	3,250	2.77	+2.29
Family First	Samuel Prior	2,351	2.00	+2.00
Total formal votes		117,339	97.42	+1.86
Informal votes		3,113	2.58	−1.86
Turnout		120,452	93.00	+0.46
Two-party-preferred result
Labor	Louise Miller-Frost	71,698	61.10	+7.82
Liberal	Nicolle Flint	45,641	38.90	−7.82
Labor hold		Swing	+7.82	

=== Grey ===
2025 Australian federal election: Grey
Party	Candidate	Votes	%	±%
Liberal	Tom Venning	37,287	34.89	−10.43
Labor	Karin Bolton	24,053	22.50	+1.10
Independent	Anita Kuss	18,745	17.54	+17.54
One Nation	Brandon Turton	10,652	9.97	+3.71
Greens	Kathryn Hardwick-Franco	6,323	5.92	−0.86
Family First	Kylie Evans	3,856	3.61	+3.61
National	Peter Borda	3,288	3.08	+3.08
Trumpet of Patriots	Laury Hendrik Bais	2,677	2.50	+1.80
Total formal votes		106,881	92.88	−0.19
Informal votes		8,194	7.12	+0.19
Turnout		115,075	89.41	−0.21
Two-party-preferred result
Liberal	Tom Venning	58,402	54.64	−5.43
Labor	Karin Bolton	48,479	45.36	+5.43
Liberal hold		Swing	−5.43	

=== Hindmarsh ===
2025 Australian federal election: Hindmarsh
Party	Candidate	Votes	%	±%
Labor	Mark Butler	54,145	48.14	+5.96
Liberal	Chris Lehmann	25,984	23.10	−9.59
Greens	Matthew Wright	15,246	13.56	−0.31
One Nation	Rocco Deangelis	5,594	4.97	+1.04
Trumpet of Patriots	Andrew Townsend	4,782	4.25	+3.66
Family First	Alex Tennikoff	2,646	2.35	+2.35
Independent	Jake Hall-Evans	1,786	1.59	+1.59
Animal Justice	Matt Pastro	1,565	1.39	−0.73
Fusion	Adrien Aloe	723	0.64	+0.64
Total formal votes		112,471	93.65	−0.64
Informal votes		7,624	6.35	+0.64
Turnout		120,095	91.41	+0.43
Two-party-preferred result
Labor	Mark Butler	74,623	66.35	+7.40
Liberal	Chris Lehmann	37,848	33.65	−7.40
Labor hold		Swing	+7.40	

=== Kingston ===
2025 Australian federal election: Kingston
Party	Candidate	Votes	%	±%
Labor	Amanda Rishworth	59,758	53.03	+3.83
Liberal	Jim Rishworth	20,994	18.63	−7.22
Greens	John Photakis	15,149	13.44	+1.00
One Nation	Nathan Skrlj	7,018	6.23	+1.37
Trumpet of Patriots	Russell Jackson	4,165	3.70	+2.71
Family First	Steven Price	3,560	3.16	+3.16
Animal Justice	Bin Liu	2,051	1.82	+1.82
Total formal votes		112,695	95.79	−0.40
Informal votes		4,959	4.21	+0.40
Turnout		117,654	91.98	+0.61
Two-party-preferred result
Labor	Amanda Rishworth	79,721	70.74	+4.39
Liberal	Jim Rishworth	32,974	29.26	−4.39
Labor hold		Swing	+4.39	

=== Makin ===
2025 Australian federal election: Makin
Party	Candidate	Votes	%	±%
Labor	Tony Zappia	50,764	47.82	+1.52
Liberal	Irena Zagladov	23,871	22.49	−8.95
Greens	Samuel Moore	13,134	12.37	+0.93
One Nation	Alison Dew-Fennell	7,152	6.74	+2.00
Trumpet of Patriots	Mark Aldridge (withdrew)	4,263	4.02	+2.25
Family First	Sue Nancarrow	3,521	3.32	+3.32
Animal Justice	Geoff Russell	2,524	2.38	+2.38
Fusion	Amelie Hanna	919	0.87	+0.87
Total formal votes		106,148	93.83	−2.04
Informal votes		6,985	6.17	+2.04
Turnout		113,133	91.50	+0.30
Two-party-preferred result
Labor	Tony Zappia	68,633	64.66	+3.86
Liberal	Irena Zagladov	37,515	35.34	−3.86
Labor hold		Swing	+3.86	

=== Mayo ===
2025 Australian federal election: Mayo
Party	Candidate	Votes	%	±%
Centre Alliance	Rebekha Sharkie	37,453	29.92	−1.49
Liberal	Zane Basic	29,551	23.61	−3.42
Labor	Marisa Bell	26,718	21.34	+3.23
Greens	Genevieve Dawson-Scott	17,048	13.62	+1.83
One Nation	Rebecca Hewett	7,493	5.99	+1.88
Trumpet of Patriots	Simeon Bidwell	3,522	2.81	+1.67
Family First	Ben Hackett	3,397	2.71	+2.71
Total formal votes		125,182	96.45	+1.50
Informal votes		4,603	3.55	−1.50
Turnout		129,785	94.17	+0.49
Notional two-party-preferred count
Labor	Marisa Bell	68,820	54.98	+3.39
Liberal	Zane Basic	56,362	45.02	−3.39
Two-candidate-preferred result
Centre Alliance	Rebekha Sharkie	81,231	64.89	+2.63
Labor	Marisa Bell	43,951	35.11	+35.11
Centre Alliance hold		Swing	+2.63	

=== Spence ===
2025 Australian federal election: Spence
Party	Candidate	Votes	%	±%
Labor	Matt Burnell	49,463	44.33	+0.47
Liberal	Daniel Wild	20,852	18.69	−6.87
Greens	Luke Skinner	16,166	14.49	+3.14
One Nation	Darryl Bothe	10,654	9.55	−1.31
Family First	John Bennett	4,901	4.39	+4.39
Trumpet of Patriots	Paul Morrell	4,454	3.99	+2.36
Independent	Kym Hanton	2,749	2.46	+2.46
Animal Justice	Miranda Smith	2,343	2.10	+2.10
Total formal votes		111,582	91.80	−3.25
Informal votes		9,968	8.20	+3.25
Turnout		121,550	87.51	+0.94
Two-party-preferred result
Labor	Matt Burnell	72,903	65.34	+2.44
Liberal	Daniel Wild	38,679	34.66	−2.44
Labor hold		Swing	+2.44	

=== Sturt ===
2025 Australian federal election: Sturt
Party	Candidate	Votes	%	±%
Labor	Claire Clutterham	41,333	35.29	+4.63
Liberal	James Stevens	40,228	34.34	−8.80
Greens	Katie McCusker	18,295	15.62	−0.77
Independent	Verity Cooper	8,413	7.18	+7.18
One Nation	Peter Bogatec	4,035	3.44	+0.87
Trumpet of Patriots	Nicholas Duffield	2,553	2.18	+1.51
Family First	Mervin Joshua	2,280	1.95	+1.95
Total formal votes		117,137	96.66	+2.15
Informal votes		4,049	3.34	−2.15
Turnout		121,186	93.01	+0.63
Two-party-preferred result
Labor	Claire Clutterham	66,326	56.62	+7.07
Liberal	James Stevens	50,811	43.38	−7.07
Labor gain from Liberal		Swing	+7.07	
