= Results of the 2019 Australian federal election in South Australia =

2019 Australian federal election (South Australia)
- 18 May 2019

All 10 South Australian seats in the Australian House of Representatives and 6 seats in the Australian Senate
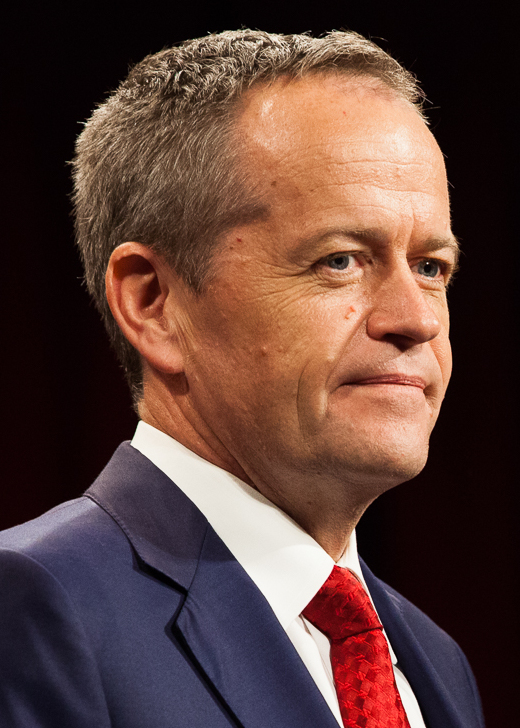

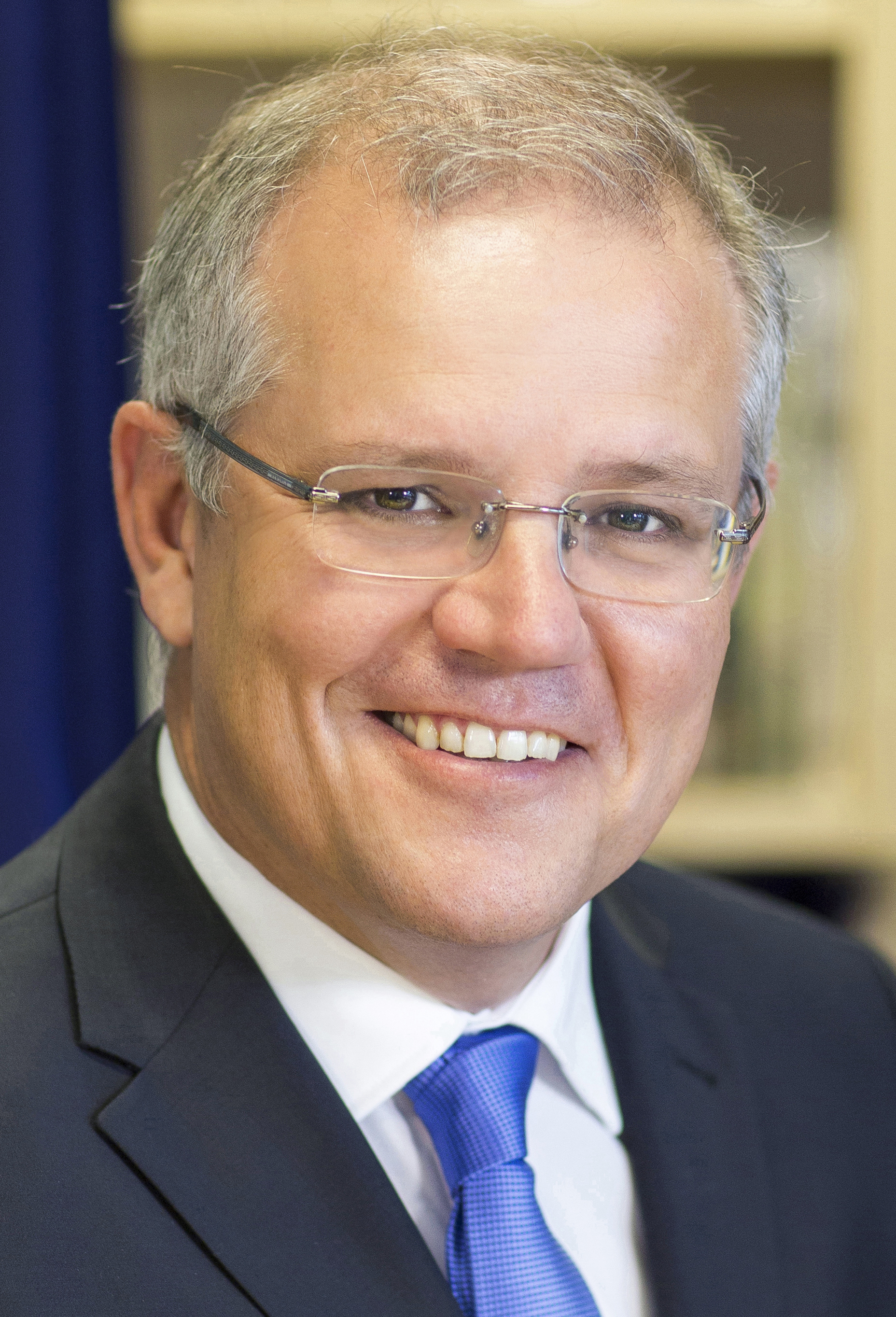

	First party	Second party	Third party
Leader	Bill Shorten	Scott Morrison	No leader
Party	Labor	Liberal/National coalition	Centre Alliance
Last election	6 seats	4 seats	1 seat
Seats won	5 seats	4 seats	1 seat
Seat change	▼1	Steady	Steady
Popular vote	379,495	438,013	46,931
Percentage	35.38%	40.83%	4.38%
Swing	▲3.83	▲5.74	▼16.88
TPP	50.71%	49.29%
TPP swing	▼1.56	▲1.56

This is a list of electoral division results for the 2019 Australian federal election in the state of South Australia.

This election was held using instant runoff voting. There was one "turn-over" at this election in South Australia. The seat of Mayo was won by the Centre Alliance despite the Liberals finishing first.

== Overall results ==
Party	Votes	%	Swing	Seats	Change
Liberal/National Coalition
Liberal Party of Australia	435,217	40.57	+5.48	4	Steady
National Party of Australia	2,796	0.26	+0.26		Steady
Coalition total	438,013	40.83	+5.74	4	Steady
Australian Labor Party	379,495	35.38	+3.83	5	▼1
Australian Greens	103,036	9.61	+3.40		
Centre Alliance	46,931	4.38	−16.88	1	Steady
United Australia Party	46,007	4.29	+4.29		
Animal Justice Party	29,811	2.78	+1.93		
Pauline Hanson's One Nation	8,990	0.84	+0.84		
Fraser Anning's Conservative National Party	2,920	0.27	+0.27		
Australian Democrats	2,039	0.19	+0.19		
Child Protection Party	1,219	0.11	+0.11		
Rise Up Australia Party	603	0.06	+0.06		
Australian Progressives	565	0.05	+0.05		
Independent	13,019	1.21	+0.47		
Total	1,072,648			10	▼1
Two-party-preferred vote
Labor	543,898	50.71	−1.56	5	▼2
Liberal/National Coalition	528,750	49.29	+1.56	4	▲1
Invalid/blank votes	54,202	4.81	+0.63		
Registered voters/turnout	1,210,817	93.07	+1.26		
Source: AEC Tally Room

== Results by division ==
=== Adelaide ===
2019 Australian federal election: Adelaide
Party	Candidate	Votes	%	±%
Labor	Steve Georganas	43,163	40.27	+1.20
Liberal	Shaun Osborn	38,753	36.16	+3.60
Greens	Barbara Pocock	16,853	15.72	+5.75
United Australia	Antonio Rea	3,479	3.25	+3.25
Animal Justice	Deanna Kangas	2,894	2.70	+1.23
Democrats	Chris James	2,039	1.90	+1.90
Total formal votes		107,181	96.30	+0.18
Informal votes		4,118	3.70	−0.18
Turnout		111,299	91.52	+1.73
Two-party-preferred result
Labor	Steve Georganas	62,362	58.18	−0.12
Liberal	Shaun Osborn	44,819	41.82	+0.12
Labor hold		Swing	−0.12	

=== Barker ===
2019 Australian federal election: Barker
Party	Candidate	Votes	%	±%
Liberal	Tony Pasin	61,155	57.88	+12.35
Labor	Mat O'Brien	22,205	21.01	+4.68
Greens	Rosa Hillam	7,229	6.84	+3.23
United Australia	Bert Bacher	6,259	5.92	+5.92
Centre Alliance	Kelly Gladigau	3,082	2.92	−25.67
Animal Justice	Karen Eckermann	2,940	2.78	+2.78
National	Miles Hannemann	2,796	2.65	+2.65
Total formal votes		105,666	94.43	−1.31
Informal votes		6,227	5.57	+1.31
Turnout		111,893	94.53	+0.50
Two-party-preferred result
Liberal	Tony Pasin	72,851	68.94	+14.20
Labor	Mat O'Brien	32,815	31.06	+31.06
Liberal hold		Swing	+14.20	

=== Boothby ===
2019 Australian federal election: Boothby
Party	Candidate	Votes	%	±%
Liberal	Nicolle Flint	49,973	45.19	+3.50
Labor	Nadia Clancy	38,297	34.63	+7.70
Greens	Stef Rozitis	13,224	11.96	+3.78
Independent	Trevor Jones	2,843	2.57	+2.57
Animal Justice	Geoff Russell	2,675	2.42	+0.99
United Australia	Peter Salerno	2,094	1.89	+1.89
Conservative National	Adrian Cheok	868	0.79	+0.78
Rise Up Australia	Carol Wong	603	0.55	+0.55
Total formal votes		110,577	95.30	−0.55
Informal votes		5,453	4.70	+0.55
Turnout		116,030	93.61	+1.14
Two-party-preferred result
Liberal	Nicolle Flint	56,812	51.38	−1.33
Labor	Nadia Clancy	53,765	48.62	+1.33
Liberal hold		Swing	−1.33	

=== Grey ===
2019 Australian federal election: Grey
Party	Candidate	Votes	%	±%
Liberal	Rowan Ramsey	52,392	50.65	+8.49
Labor	Karin Bolton	23,612	22.83	+0.26
One Nation	David Stone	8,990	8.69	+8.69
Centre Alliance	Andrea Broadfoot	5,324	5.15	−21.55
Greens	Candace Champion	4,760	4.60	+1.91
United Australia	Alexander Warren	3,891	3.76	+3.76
Animal Justice	Jacqui Edgecombe	2,681	2.59	+2.59
Independent	Richard Carmody	1,797	1.74	+1.74
Total formal votes		103,447	93.09	−2.90
Informal votes		7,684	6.91	+2.90
Turnout		111,131	92.65	0.00
Two-party-preferred result
Liberal	Rowan Ramsey	65,504	63.32	+11.37
Labor	Karin Bolton	37,943	36.68	+36.68
Liberal hold		Swing	+11.37	

=== Hindmarsh ===
2019 Australian federal election: Hindmarsh
Party	Candidate	Votes	%	±%
Labor	Mark Butler	46,950	43.09	+3.10
Liberal	Jake Hall-Evans	40,039	36.75	+5.45
Greens	Matt Farrell	11,966	10.98	+4.38
United Australia	Rose Morris	4,729	4.34	+4.34
Animal Justice	Alison Kelty	3,219	2.95	+1.18
Conservative National	Rajan Vaid	2,052	1.88	+1.88
Total formal votes		108,955	95.68	+0.43
Informal votes		4,924	4.32	−0.43
Turnout		113,879	92.85	+1.55
Two-party-preferred result
Labor	Mark Butler	61,606	56.54	−1.89
Liberal	Jake Hall-Evans	47,349	43.46	+1.89
Labor hold		Swing	−1.89	

=== Kingston ===
2019 Australian federal election: Kingston
Party	Candidate	Votes	%	±%
Labor	Amanda Rishworth	53,655	50.58	+5.22
Liberal	Laura Curran	33,650	31.72	+5.60
Greens	Nikki Mortier	9,764	9.20	+3.36
United Australia	Jodie Hoskin	5,270	4.97	+4.97
Animal Justice	Kellie Somers	3,742	3.53	+3.27
Total formal votes		106,081	95.89	−0.25
Informal votes		4,547	4.11	+0.25
Turnout		110,628	93.17	+1.31
Two-party-preferred result
Labor	Amanda Rishworth	65,708	61.94	−1.61
Liberal	Laura Curran	40,373	38.06	+1.61
Labor hold		Swing	−1.61	

=== Makin ===
2019 Australian federal election: Makin
Party	Candidate	Votes	%	±%
Labor	Tony Zappia	51,666	48.42	+5.72
Liberal	Hemant Dave	35,087	32.88	+5.42
Greens	Stephanie Stewart	9,211	8.63	+3.92
United Australia	Rachel Collis	6,874	6.44	+6.44
Animal Justice	Lyn Gaston	3,866	3.62	+2.00
Total formal votes		106,704	95.51	+0.13
Informal votes		5,021	4.49	−0.13
Turnout		111,725	93.12	+1.03
Two-party-preferred result
Labor	Tony Zappia	63,726	59.72	−1.07
Liberal	Hemant Dave	42,978	40.28	+1.07
Labor hold		Swing	−1.07	

=== Mayo ===
2019 Australian federal election: Mayo
Party	Candidate	Votes	%	±%
Liberal	Georgina Downer	42,426	37.65	+1.03
Centre Alliance	Rebekha Sharkie	38,525	34.19	+1.27
Labor	Saskia Gerhardy	15,390	13.66	−3.03
Greens	Anne Bourne	10,436	9.26	+1.12
United Australia	Michael Cane	3,597	3.19	+3.19
Animal Justice	Helen Dowland	2,302	2.04	+1.97
Total formal votes		112,676	96.95	−0.06
Informal votes		3,540	3.05	+0.06
Turnout		116,216	94.97	+2.25
Notional two-party-preferred count
Liberal	Georgina Downer	59,205	52.54	−0.73
Labor	Saskia Gerhardy	53,471	47.46	+0.73
Two-candidate-preferred result
Centre Alliance	Rebekha Sharkie	62,124	55.14	−2.22
Liberal	Georgina Downer	50,552	44.86	+2.22
Centre Alliance hold		Swing	−2.22	

=== Spence ===
2019 Australian federal election: Spence
Party	Candidate	Votes	%	±%
Labor	Nick Champion	51,791	50.96	+5.79
Liberal	Kathleen Bourne	26,252	25.83	+5.13
Greens	Daniel Jury	7,330	7.21	+2.65
United Australia	Ron Fiedler	7,157	7.04	+7.04
Independent	Nathan Herbert	5,473	5.39	+5.39
Animal Justice	Rita Kuhlmann	3,626	3.57	+2.96
Total formal votes		101,629	94.02	−0.14
Informal votes		6,467	5.98	+0.14
Turnout		108,096	90.54	+2.63
Two-party-preferred result
Labor	Nick Champion	65,174	64.13	−3.04
Liberal	Kathleen Bourne	36,455	35.87	+3.04
Labor notional hold		Swing	−3.04	

=== Sturt ===
2019 Australian federal election: Sturt
Party	Candidate	Votes	%	±%
Liberal	James Stevens	55,490	50.57	+6.20
Labor	Cressida O'Hanlon	32,766	29.86	+6.56
Greens	Paul Boundy	12,263	11.18	+3.61
Independent	Nick Larcombe	2,906	2.65	+2.65
United Australia	Hedley Harding	2,657	2.42	+2.42
Animal Justice	Harbinda Roberts	1,866	1.70	+0.43
Child Protection	Colin Thomas	1,219	1.11	+1.11
Progressives	Angela Fulco	565	0.51	+0.51
Total formal votes		109,732	94.63	−1.78
Informal votes		6,221	5.37	+1.78
Turnout		115,953	93.65	+0.46
Two-party-preferred result
Liberal	James Stevens	62,404	56.87	+1.48
Labor	Cressida O'Hanlon	47,328	43.13	−1.48
Liberal hold		Swing	+1.48	
