= Results of the 2016 Australian federal election in South Australia =

2016 Australian federal election (South Australia)
- 2 July 2016

All 11 South Australian seats in the Australian House of Representatives and all 12 seats in the Australian Senate
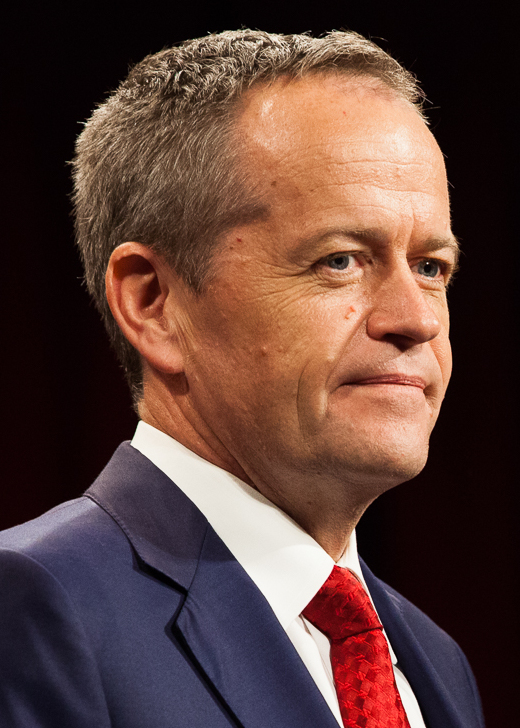

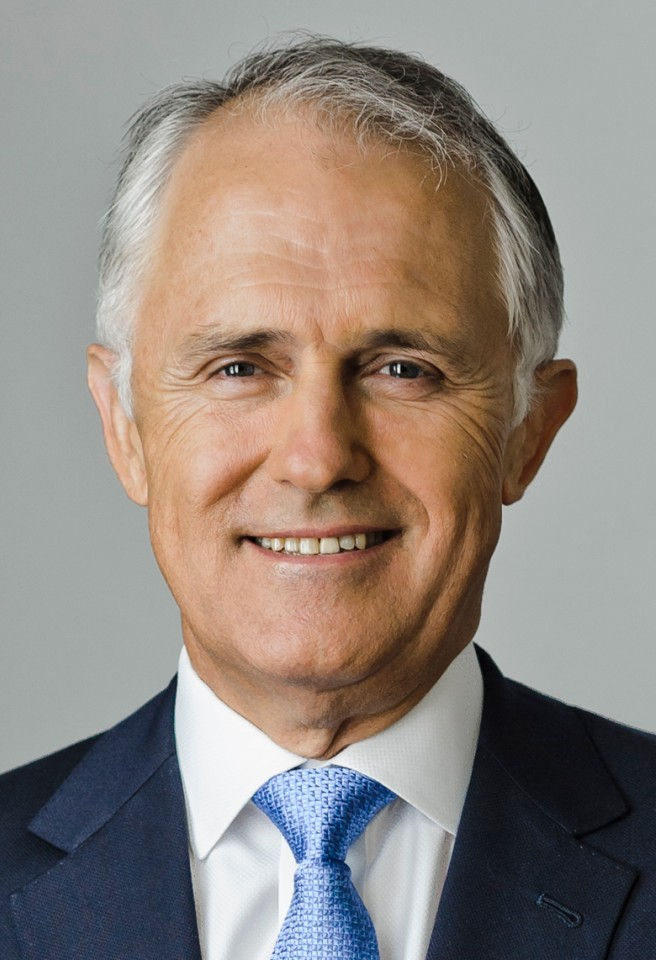

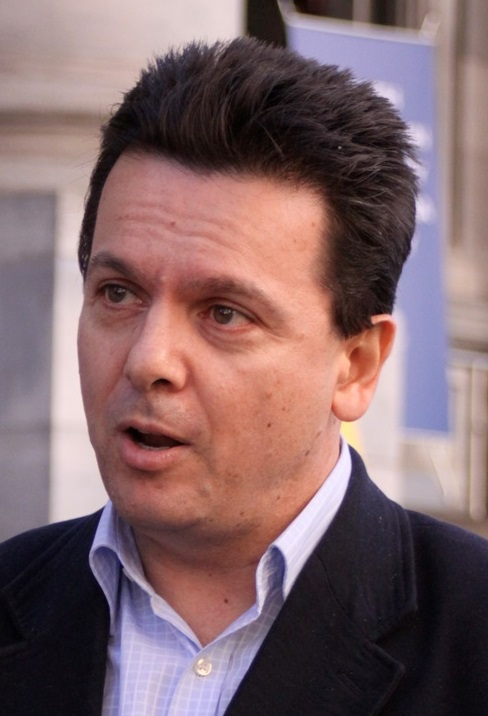
	First party	Second party	Third party
Leader	Bill Shorten	Malcolm Turnbull	Nick Xenophon
Party	Labor	Liberal/National coalition	Xenophon Team
Leader since			1 June 2013
Last election	5 seats	6 seats	–
Seats won	6 seats	4 seats	1 seat
Seat change	▲1	▼2	New
Popular vote	365,155	496,719	221,210
Percentage	31.55%	35.09%	21.26%
Swing	▼4.18	▼9.40	New
TPP	52.27%	47.73%
TPP swing	▲4.63	▼4.63
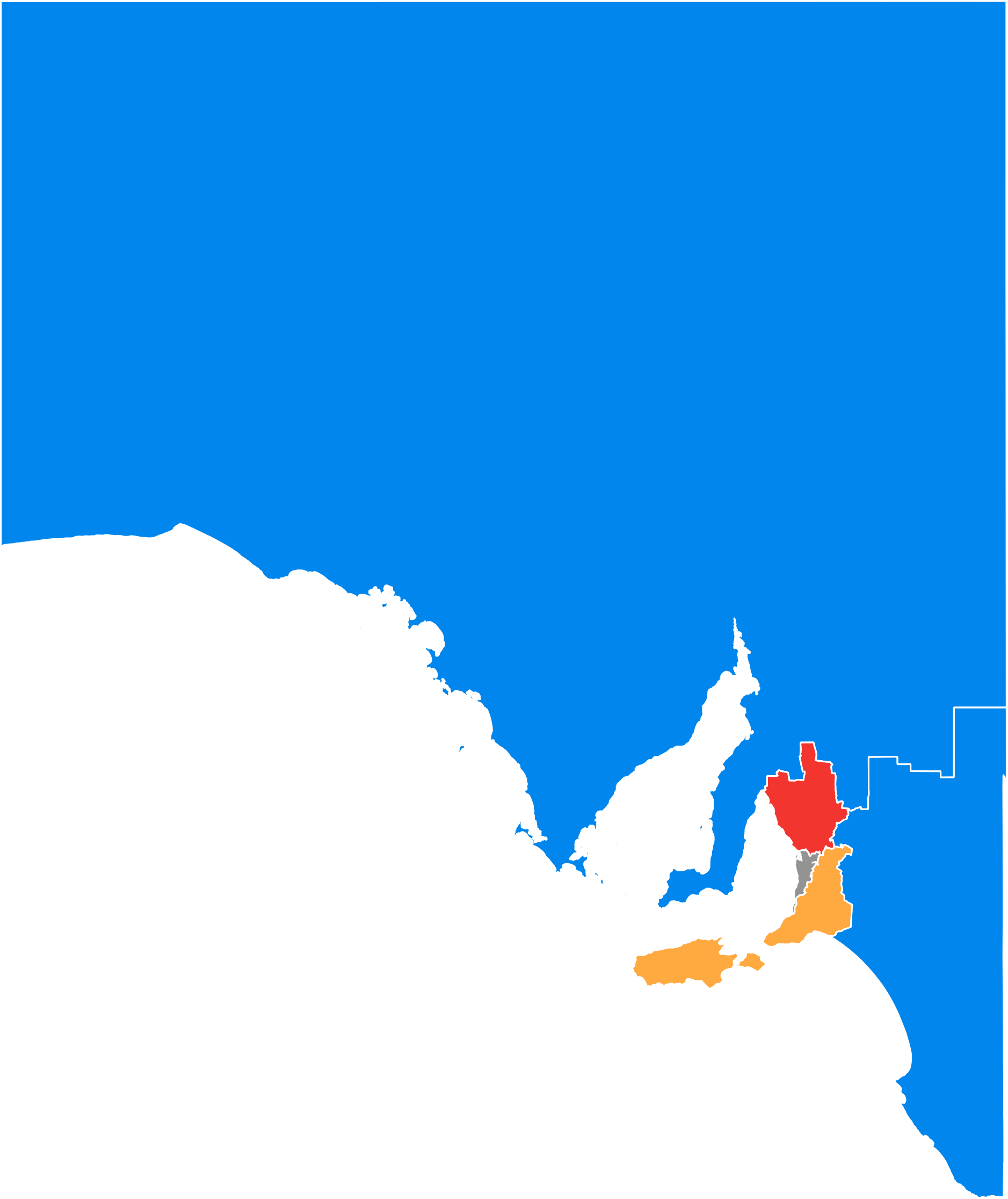
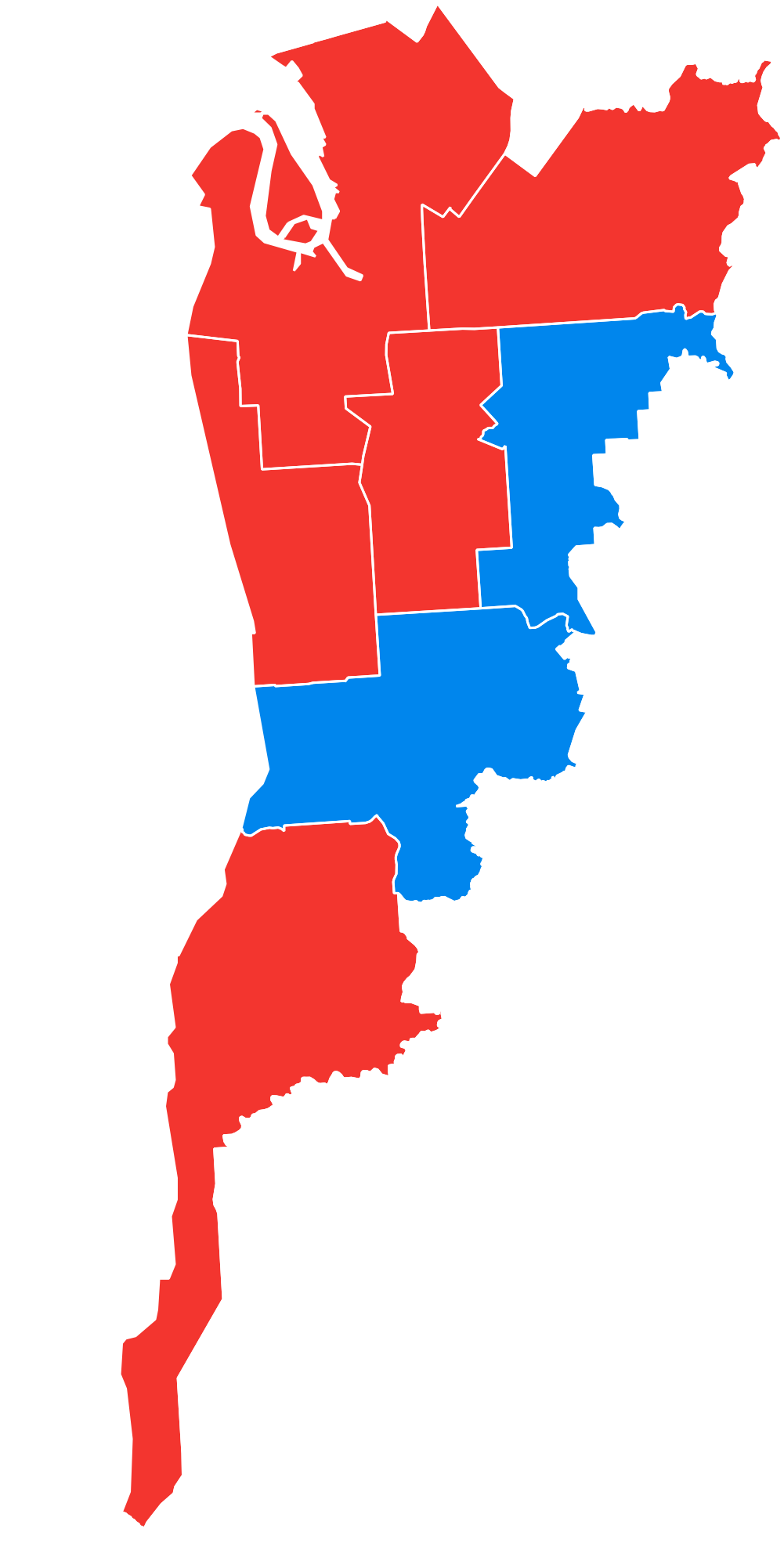

This is a list of electoral division results for the 2016 Australian federal election in the state of South Australia.

== Overall results ==
Party	Votes	%	Swing	Seats	Change
Liberal Party of Australia	365,155	35.09	–9.40	4	▼2
Australian Labor Party	328,314	31.55	–4.18	6	▲1
Nick Xenophon Team	221,210	21.26	+21.26	1	▲1
Australian Greens	64,605	6.21	−2.07		
Family First Party	40,941	3.93	−1.48		
Animal Justice Party	8,881	0.85	+0.85		
Liberal Democratic Party	2,178	0.21	+0.21		
Christian Democratic Party	1,715	0.16	+0.16		
Independent	7,737	0.74	−0.54		
Total	1,040,736			11	
Two-party-preferred vote
Australian Labor Party	544,017	52.27	+4.63	6	▲1
Liberal Party of Australia	496,719	47.73	−4.63	4	▼2

Liberal to Labor: Hindmarsh

Liberal to Xenophon: Mayo

== Results by division ==
=== Adelaide ===
2016 Australian federal election: Adelaide
Party	Candidate	Votes	%	±%
Liberal	David Colovic	34,809	36.43	−5.63
Labor	Kate Ellis	34,325	35.93	−6.33
Xenophon	Joe Hill	12,283	12.86	+12.86
Greens	Sophie Guy	9,973	10.44	+0.32
Family First	Adrian Rivish	1,832	1.92	−0.45
Animal Justice	Matt Tidswell	1,292	1.35	+1.35
Liberal Democrats	Tyrone Lock	1,030	1.08	+1.08
Total formal votes		95,544	96.84	+0.80
Informal votes		3,118	3.16	−0.80
Turnout		98,662	90.34	−2.13
Two-party-preferred result
Labor	Kate Ellis	52,219	54.65	+0.70
Liberal	David Colovic	43,325	45.35	−0.70
Labor hold		Swing	+0.70	

=== Barker ===
2016 Australian federal election: Barker
Party	Candidate	Votes	%	±%
Liberal	Tony Pasin	44,001	46.59	−6.02
Xenophon	James Stacey	27,452	29.07	+29.07
Labor	Mat O'Brien	14,363	15.21	−3.16
Family First	Yvonne Zeppel	5,458	5.78	−2.18
Greens	Mark Keough	3,171	3.36	−2.29
Total formal votes		94,445	95.72	+1.10
Informal votes		4,228	4.28	−1.10
Turnout		98,673	93.44	−1.18
Notional two-party-preferred count
Liberal	Tony Pasin	61,566	65.19	−1.36
Labor	Mat O'Brien	32,879	34.81	+1.36
Two-candidate-preferred result
Liberal	Tony Pasin	51,698	54.74	−11.81
Xenophon	James Stacey	42,747	45.26	+45.26
Liberal hold		Swing	N/A	

=== Boothby ===
2016 Australian federal election: Boothby
Party	Candidate	Votes	%	±%
Liberal	Nicolle Flint	39,298	41.24	−9.11
Labor	Mark Ward	23,366	24.52	−6.25
Xenophon	Karen Hockley	19,688	20.66	+20.66
Greens	Jane Bange	8,001	8.40	−3.57
Family First	Gary Wheatcroft	2,477	2.60	−1.31
Animal Justice	Evelyn Carroll	1,356	1.42	+1.42
Independent	Jamie Armfield	664	0.70	+0.70
Independent	Robert De Jonge	438	0.46	+0.46
Total formal votes		95,288	95.61	−0.91
Informal votes		4,374	4.39	+0.91
Turnout		99,662	92.86	−1.06
Two-party-preferred result
Liberal	Nicolle Flint	50,980	53.50	−3.62
Labor	Mark Ward	44,308	46.50	+3.62
Liberal hold		Swing	−3.62	

=== Grey ===
2016 Australian federal election: Grey
Party	Candidate	Votes	%	±%
Liberal	Rowan Ramsey	38,409	42.74	−12.91
Xenophon	Andrea Broadfoot	24,936	27.74	+27.74
Labor	Scott Martin	19,373	21.56	−5.74
Family First	Cheryl Kaminski	3,710	4.13	−1.37
Greens	Jillian Marsh	2,304	2.56	−1.15
Independent	Phillip Gourlay	1,144	1.27	+1.27
Total formal votes		89,876	96.13	+1.53
Informal votes		3,619	3.87	−1.53
Turnout		93,495	91.61	−1.40
Notional two-party-preferred count
Liberal	Rowan Ramsey	52,696	58.63	−4.91
Labor	Scott Martin	37,180	41.37	+4.91
Two-candidate-preferred result
Liberal	Rowan Ramsey	46,692	51.95	−11.59
Xenophon	Andrea Broadfoot	43,184	48.05	+48.05
Liberal hold		Swing	N/A	

=== Hindmarsh ===
2016 Australian federal election: Hindmarsh
Party	Candidate	Votes	%	±%
Liberal	Matt Williams	39,570	40.36	−5.81
Labor	Steve Georganas	33,355	34.02	−3.93
Xenophon	Daniel Kirk	14,774	15.07	+15.07
Greens	Patrick O'Sullivan	6,401	6.53	−2.31
Family First	Mark Potter	1,977	2.02	−1.03
Animal Justice	Bin Liu	1,456	1.49	+1.49
Christian Democrats	Marina William	499	0.51	+0.51
Total formal votes		98,032	95.86	+0.74
Informal votes		4,232	4.14	−0.74
Turnout		102,264	91.54	−1.51
Two-party-preferred result
Labor	Steve Georganas	49,586	50.58	+2.47
Liberal	Matt Williams	48,446	49.42	−2.47
Labor gain from Liberal		Swing	+2.47	

=== Kingston ===
2016 Australian federal election: Kingston
Party	Candidate	Votes	%	±%
Labor	Amanda Rishworth	46,151	49.42	+0.16
Liberal	Kelvin Binns	21,772	23.31	−9.09
Xenophon	Damian Carey	16,059	17.20	+17.20
Greens	Robyn Holtham	5,361	5.74	−1.15
Family First	Geoff Doecke	4,048	4.33	−1.55
Total formal votes		93,391	96.27	+1.34
Informal votes		3,617	3.73	−1.34
Turnout		97,008	91.79	−2.01
Two-party-preferred result
Labor	Amanda Rishworth	62,616	67.05	+7.35
Liberal	Kelvin Binns	30,775	32.95	−7.35
Labor hold		Swing	+7.35	

=== Makin ===
2016 Australian federal election: Makin
Party	Candidate	Votes	%	±%
Labor	Tony Zappia	39,358	41.84	−3.72
Liberal	Graham Reynolds	26,847	28.54	−8.66
Xenophon	Craig Bossie	15,614	16.60	+16.60
Greens	Keiran Snape	4,373	4.65	−1.26
Family First	Paul Coombe	4,273	4.54	−1.87
Independent	Mark Aldridge	2,126	2.26	+2.26
Animal Justice	Zarina Greenberg	1,479	1.57	+1.57
Total formal votes		94,070	95.56	+0.44
Informal votes		4,366	4.44	−0.44
Turnout		98,436	91.92	−2.06
Two-party-preferred result
Labor	Tony Zappia	56,116	59.65	+4.59
Liberal	Graham Reynolds	37,954	40.35	−4.59
Labor hold		Swing	+4.59	

=== Mayo ===
2016 Australian federal election: Mayo
Party	Candidate	Votes	%	±%
Liberal	Jamie Briggs	35,915	37.76	−16.06
Xenophon	Rebekha Sharkie	33,158	34.86	+34.86
Labor	Glen Dallimore	12,859	13.52	−7.62
Greens	Nathan Daniell	7,661	8.05	−6.10
Family First	Bruce Hicks	4,375	4.60	−2.54
Liberal Democrats	Luke Dzivinski	1,148	1.21	+1.21
Total formal votes		95,116	97.11	+0.98
Informal votes		2,828	2.89	−0.98
Turnout		97,944	94.19	−0.41
Notional two-party-preferred count
Liberal	Jamie Briggs	52,650	55.35	−7.16
Labor	Glen Dallimore	42,466	44.65	+7.16
Two-candidate-preferred result
Xenophon	Rebekha Sharkie	52,283	54.97	+54.97
Liberal	Jamie Briggs	42,833	45.03	−17.18
Xenophon gain from Liberal		Swing	N/A	

=== Port Adelaide ===
2016 Australian federal election: Port Adelaide
Party	Candidate	Votes	%	±%
Labor	Mark Butler	46,314	48.24	−2.34
Xenophon	Michael Slattery	17,970	18.72	+18.72
Liberal	Emma Flowerdew	17,884	18.63	−7.69
Greens	Matthew Carey	6,683	6.96	−1.65
Family First	Bruce Hambour	4,483	4.67	−2.85
Animal Justice	Janine Clipstone	2,078	2.16	+2.16
Christian Democrats	Jenalie Salt	597	0.62	+0.62
Total formal votes		96,009	94.19	+0.39
Informal votes		5,927	5.81	−0.39
Turnout		101,936	89.93	−2.24
Notional two-party-preferred count
Labor	Mark Butler	67,119	69.91	+5.89
Liberal	Emma Flowerdew	28,890	30.09	−5.89
Two-candidate-preferred result
Labor	Mark Butler	62,274	64.86	+0.84
Xenophon	Michael Slattery	33,735	35.14	+35.14
Labor hold		Swing	N/A	

=== Sturt ===
2016 Australian federal election: Sturt
Party	Candidate	Votes	%	±%
Liberal	Christopher Pyne	41,351	44.45	−9.95
Labor	Matt Loader	20,653	22.20	−6.70
Xenophon	Matthew Wright	19,684	21.16	+21.16
Greens	Rebecca Galdies	6,575	7.07	−2.73
Family First	Craig Bowyer	2,912	3.13	−0.79
Animal Justice	Geoff Russell	1,220	1.31	+1.31
Independent	Neil Aitchison	637	0.68	+0.68
Total formal votes		93,032	96.22	+0.74
Informal votes		3,656	3.78	−0.74
Turnout		96,688	92.31	−1.14
Two-party-preferred result
Liberal	Christopher Pyne	51,998	55.89	−4.19
Labor	Matt Loader	41,034	44.11	+4.19
Liberal hold		Swing	−4.19	

=== Wakefield ===
2016 Australian federal election: Wakefield
Party	Candidate	Votes	%	±%
Labor	Nick Champion	38,197	39.82	−1.70
Liberal	Kathleen Bourne	25,299	26.37	−11.52
Xenophon	Richard Inwood	19,592	20.42	+20.42
Family First	Marilyn Phillips	5,396	5.62	−0.36
Greens	Craig Vanstone	4,102	4.28	−0.87
Independent	John Bolton	2,728	2.84	+2.84
Christian Democrats	Ralph Anderson	619	0.65	+0.65
Total formal votes		95,933	94.61	+0.30
Informal votes		5,470	5.39	−0.30
Turnout		101,403	90.34	−2.77
Two-party-preferred result
Labor	Nick Champion	58,494	60.97	+7.57
Liberal	Kathleen Bourne	37,439	39.03	−7.57
Labor hold		Swing	+7.57	
