= Rowan Ramsey =

Australian politician (born 1956)

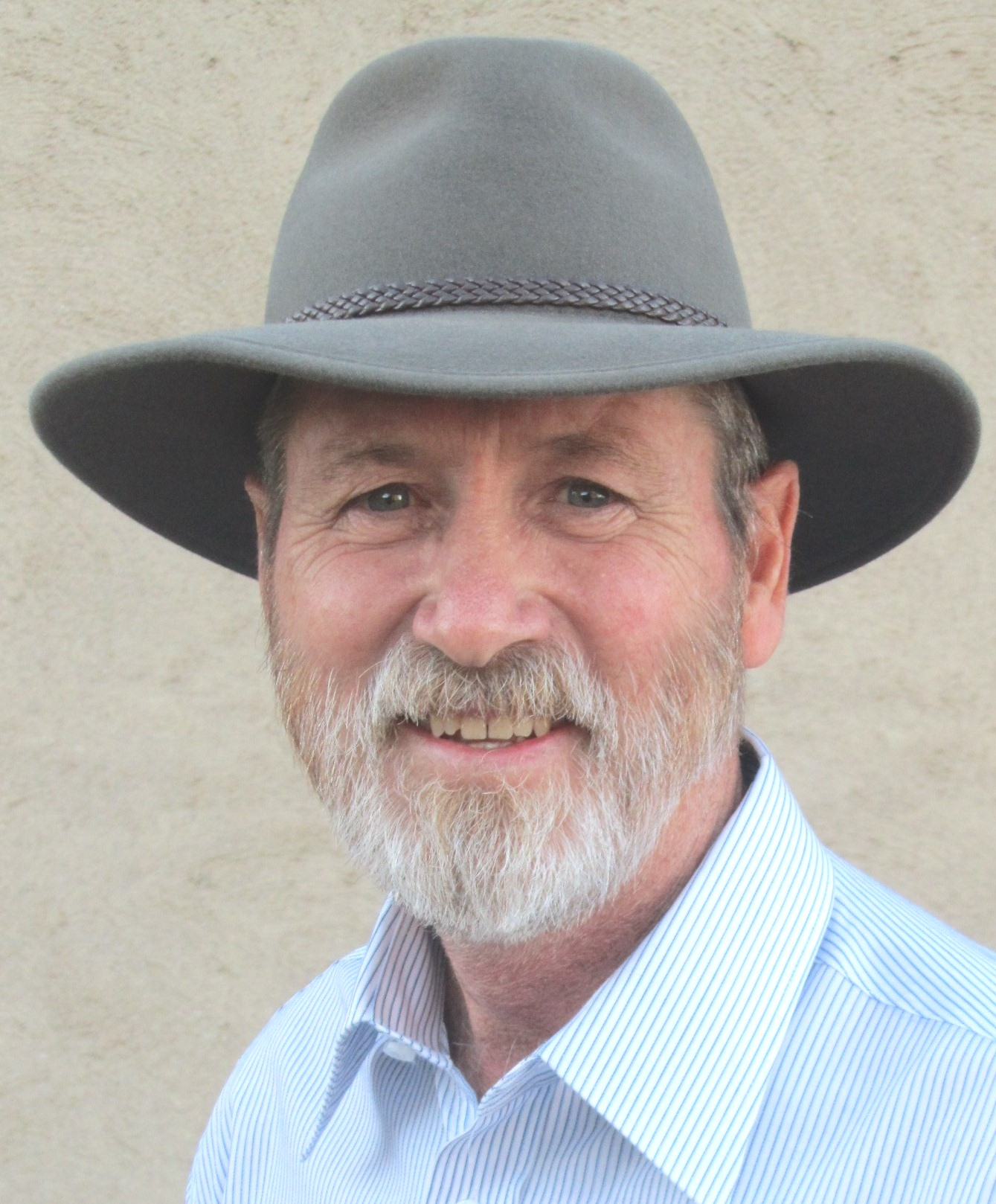

Member of the Australian Parliament for Grey
- In office 24 November 2007 – 28 March 2025
- Preceded by: Barry Wakelin
- Succeeded by: Tom Venning

Personal details
- Born: Rowan Eric Ramsey; 4 August 1956 (age 69) Kimba, South Australia, Australia
- Party: Liberal Party of Australia
- Occupation: Farmer

Rowan Eric Ramsey (born 4 August 1956) is an Australian former politician who was a member for the House of Representatives seat of Grey from 2007 to 2025.

Ramsey is a member of the National Right faction of the Liberal Party, after previously being aligned with the centre-right faction during the Morrison government.

== Nuclear industrial development ==
In 2015 Ramsey commended the Government of South Australia for initiating the Nuclear Fuel Cycle Royal Commission. Commencing in March 2015, the Commission was tasked to investigate the opportunities and risk of further nuclear industrial development for South Australia, which includes mining, processing, power generation and waste management. He said of the decision:

"I congratulate the Premier on this move; we simply cannot make sensible informed decisions about this industry if we don't talk about it."

Ramsey supported the potential storage of low and intermediate level nuclear waste in his electorate of Grey. He intended to nominate his own property as a potential candidate site, but was advised not to by Minister Ian Macfarlane due to a perceived conflict of interest. He told the media:

"I would be more than happy, for instance, to host it on my farm. But I wouldn't nominate my farm without actually speaking to my neighbours and having a community consultation."

Up to four sites within his electorate were nominated.

== Electoral performance ==
A ReachTEL seat-level opinion poll in the safe Liberal seat of Grey of 665 voters conducted by robocall on 9 June during the 2016 election campaign surprisingly found Nick Xenophon Team candidate Andrea Broadfoot leading the Liberals' Ramsey 54–46 on the two-candidate vote. Seat-level opinion polls in the other two rural Liberal South Australian seats revealed the Nick Xenophon Team also leading in both Mayo and Barker.

Ramsey retained the seat at the 2016 election for Grey with a reduced margin of 1.95% over Broadfoot. He comfortably retained the seat at the 2019 election for Grey with a margin of 13.32% (a two-party preferred swing of 5.57% toward him) over Labor, with Broadfoot finishing fourth.

Electoral history
Election	Division	First preference	Two-candidate vote
2007	Grey	46.26%	54.43%
2010	Grey	55.78%	61.16%
2013	Grey	55.65%	63.54%
2016	Grey	42.74%	51.95% (Note: Over Nick Xenophon Team.)
2016	Grey	42.74%	58.63% (Note: over Labor.)
2019	Grey	50.65%	63.32%
2022	Grey	42.18%	60.07%

== Notes ==
Parliament of Australia
Preceded by Barry Wakelin	Member for Grey; 2007–2025	Succeeded by Tom Venning
