= Rex Patrick =

Australian politician (born 1967)

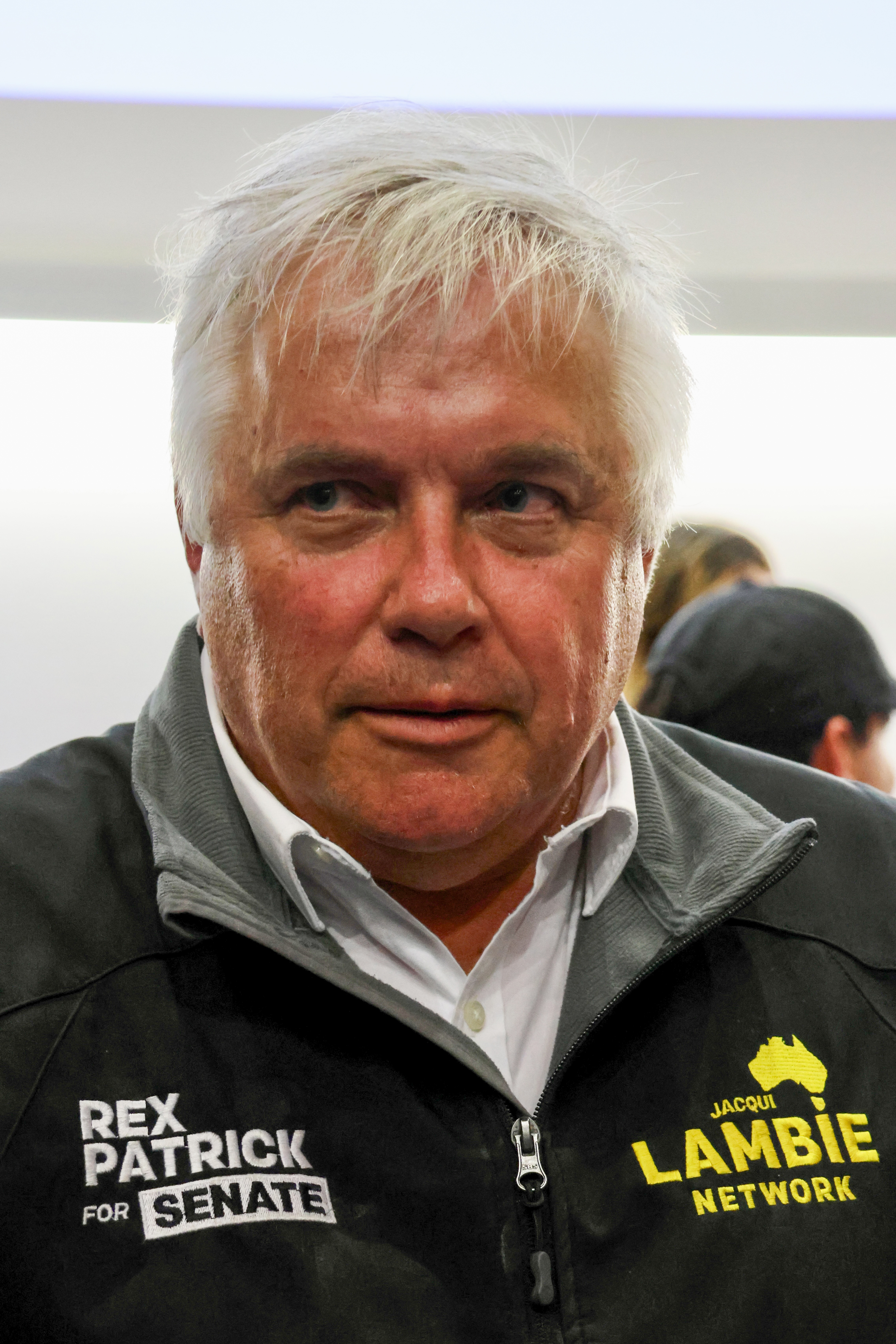
- Patrick in 2025

Senator for South Australia
- In office 14 November 2017 – 30 June 2022
- Preceded by: Nick Xenophon

Personal details
- Born: 8 May 1967 (age 59) Whakatāne, New Zealand
- Party: Jacqui Lambie Network (since 2024)
- Other political affiliations: Liberal (before 2014); Centre Alliance (2015–2020) (Note: At the time Patrick joined the party, it was called the Nick Xenophon Team.); Rex Patrick Team (2021–2022); Independent (2020–2021, 2022–2024)
- Occupation: Businessman; Politician

Military service
- Allegiance: Australia
- Branch/service: Royal Australian Navy
- Years of service: 1983–1994
- Rex Patrick's voice Patrick speaking about David McBride; Recorded 6 May 2024

Rex Lyall Patrick (born 8 May 1967) is an Australian politician. He served as a Senator for South Australia from November 2017 until June 2022. He was appointed to the Senate to fill a casual vacancy caused by the resignation of Nick Xenophon. He joined the Senate as member of the Centre Alliance party, but in August 2020 left the party and became an independent. He created the Rex Patrick Team party in January 2021 and sat in parliament as its only member for the duration of his term.

Before entering politics, Patrick served as a submariner in the Royal Australian Navy, then was a businessman and senior business executive officer.

== Early life and education ==
Patrick was born on 8 May 1967 in Whakatane, New Zealand. He moved to South Australia as a child, attending school in Whyalla then joining the Royal Australian Navy.

== Early career ==
Patrick served in the Royal Australian Navy from 1983 to 1994. He trained as an electronic technician and volunteered for submarine service. He served on several Oberon-class submarines before being selected and posted as a member of the trials crew of the first Collins-class submarine at Osborne in Adelaide.

From 1995 to 2008, Patrick worked for Sonartech Atlas as a project manager. The company was focused on the design and development of sonar systems.

In 2008, Patrick started a company called Acoustic Force, which provided training in sonar and acoustics to domestic and international customers.

In 2009, Patrick began writing articles calling for Australia to buy cheap, off-the-shelf submarines to replace the Collins-class submarine fleet. He believes that attempts were made by naval personnel to muzzle his criticisms of the Collins-class vessels. He said of the Navy's attitude towards freedom of speech and policy debate: "I presume that, from (the navy’s) perspective, the public is better served if debates about defence are devoid of any contributions from people who know about the subject.” In 2012, he noted that American nuclear-powered submarines would be more cost effective for Australia to purchase and maintain and would offer strategic advantages.

In 2013, Patrick took over a training contract with Quantum Ark Technologies, a company that trained members of the Royal Malaysian Navy.

In 2015, Patrick wrote several articles for the Australian Strategic Policy Institute (ASPI) which were published in The Strategist.

== Political career ==
=== Staffer (2010s) ===
Patrick was a staffer for Liberal Senator David Johnston. When Johnston was the Shadow Defence Minister, Patrick assisted him in exposing the very high annual cost of the Collins-class submarines compared with their very low availability rates, being well over $500 million per annum but, at one stage, not a single submarine was at sea. Due to the pressure they were able to put on the Defence Department, the Coles review was commissioned in 2012 and the problems associated with the Collins-class submarine were then rectified.

On inheriting the Quantum Ark Technologies' files in 2013, Patrick discovered a mass data breach of classified documents from the French manufacturer DCNS related to the new Indian Navy's Scorpène submarines. Patrick took the data on a disc to a senior Defence official who declined to take it and so Patrick retained the disc, even though he knew of the leak during the competition to select the international partner for the Future Submarine Project, and didn't act on it until after the contract was awarded so as not to affect France's chances in the contract.

In 2016, after the contract was awarded, and the security breach became directly relevant to Australia from a national security perspective, Patrick, then an adviser to then Senator Nick Xenophon, provided some of the documents, carefully redacted, to The Australian newspaper. Xenophon then handed the disc to Defence Minister Marise Payne. Xenophon referred to Patrick by the nickname "Inspector Rex", owing to his investigative skills and use of Freedom of Information laws to obtain information in the public interest.

Patrick was not investigated for his handling of the sensitive material, and retained his security clearance as a naval contractor.

=== Australian Senate (2017–2022) ===
On 30 October 2017, Xenophon announced Patrick as his Senate replacement, and the nomination was lodged with the South Australian Parliament on 1 November. Premier Jay Weatherill revealed that an NXT Senate candidate from the 2016 election, Tim Storer, had "assert[ed] rights" to the vacancy. On 14 November, Patrick was confirmed as the replacement senator by a joint sitting of the SA Parliament. He became a senator on 15 November when he was sworn in by the Senate.

Within three days of his appointment, Patrick defended the appointment of Xenophon as an advisor on a part-time contract, but Xenophon subsequently announced that he would leave the role "within weeks".

Patrick used his first speech in the Senate to call for more parliamentary oversight of the Australian Intelligence Community.

In December 2017, Patrick informed the Turnbull Government that NXT would suspend negotiations on welfare reform because a minister had failed to answer "reasonable questions". Patrick said that was part of "a broader problem with regard to the government’s preparedness to be appropriately open and accountable".

Notably Patrick supported the blocked a vote in the Senate that would've seen an inquiry into the Liberal and National Party government "Grass-gate" scandal. Labor was pursuing the Energy Minister Angus Taylor over his interest in a family company linked to an investigation into alleged illegal land clearing.

Patrick was critical of the Future Submarine programme, suggesting that the Rear Admiral overseeing the project, Gregory Sammut, has no professional experience in project management. The project was revealed by Xenophon to have a requirement that 50% of the submarine's manufacture be Australian, down from the publicity stated figure of 60%. Patrick called it "treachery" by the Turnbull Government.

Patrick used Parliamentary Privilege to call ExxonMobil Australia's boss, Richard James Owen, a "shameless corporate tax dodger" due to his payment of little tax in Australia. Patrick asserted that "he should be called out for what he is. Behind a veneer of professional respectability, he's a hypocrite and a corporate scumbag".

Patrick pulled a stunt in the federal Senate Chamber to push his view that submarine jobs would be lost to Western Australia. That incurred the wrath of the Senate President, Scott Ryan, who told Senator Patrick: "Remove yourself from the chamber. You're embarrassing yourself."

In August 2020, Patrick split from the Centre Alliance, arguing that standing as an independent would improve his chances for re-election at the next federal election. His Centre Alliance Senate colleague Stirling Griff regarded the move as akin to removing "a powerful voting bloc that has achieved a remarkable amount for South Australia". During the Parliamentary year, Patrick was noted for criticising the Murray-Darling Basin Authority for its delays in appointing an Indigenous representative and for putting a sunset clause on the cashless debit card in Indigenous communities. Following a tweet about alleged Australian war crimes in Afghanistan made by Zhao Lijian that was deemed offensive by some Australian politicians, Patrick called on the Commonwealth Government to expel two-thirds of China's 143 diplomats and consular staff.

In January 2021, the Australian Electoral Commission approved Patrick's application to form a political party called the Rex Patrick Team

In November 2021, Patrick was opposed to the Liberal Morrison government plans for a Voter ID Law, calling it "a solution looking for a problem"

=== Rex Patrick Team ===
Rex Patrick Team
- Abbreviation: REX, RPT
- Leader: Rex Patrick
- Founded: 26 October 2020
- Registered: 7 January 2021
- Dissolved: 24 October 2022
- Split from: Centre Alliance
- Senate: 1 / 76 (2020–2022)

The Rex Patrick Team was formed by Patrick in October 2020, after he left Centre Alliance.

The party was registered with the AEC in January 2021.

At the 2022 federal election, the party received 2.08% of the vote in the Senate in South Australia. Apart from Patrick, the only other candidate for the party was Leonie McMahon.

The party voluntarily deregistered in October 2022 after Patrick failed to be re-elected.

=== Local government ===
Patrick ran for Lord Mayor of Adelaide in the 2022 South Australian local elections in August 2022. He lost to Jane Lomax-Smith by 52 votes, prompting Patrick to appeal the result due to the small margin and potential voter fraud. Patrick subsequently dropped his appeal in March 2023.

=== Jacqui Lambie Network ===
Patrick joined the Jacqui Lambie Network, based in Tasmania, and stood for the party as a senator for South Australia in the 2025 Australian election. He has been a vocal critic of the AUKUS program. Patrick failed in his bid to get elected, getting 31,516 or 2.71% of the vote.
