= Tim Storer =

Australian politician

Senator for South Australia
- In office 16 February 2018 – 30 June 2019
- Preceded by: Skye Kakoschke-Moore
- Succeeded by: Marielle Smith

Personal details
- Born: Timothy Raphael Storer; 24 October 1969 (age 57) Loxton, South Australia, Australia
- Party: Tim Storer Independent SA Party (2018–2019)
- Other political affiliations: Nick Xenophon Team (2016–2017); Labor (1996–2002, 2013–2015)
- Spouse: Belinda Storer
- Children: 2
- Relatives: Annabel Crabb (sister-in-law)
- Education: Saint Ignatius' College
- Alma mater: University of Adelaide (BEc); Australian National University (MBA)

Timothy Raphael Storer is a former Australian politician who served as a Senator for South Australia from February 2018 to June 2019. Following the disqualification of Skye Kakoschke-Moore during the parliamentary eligibility crisis, the Court of Disputed Returns declared Storer elected on a countback. He had been ranked below Kakoschke-Moore on the Nick Xenophon Team's ticket at the 2016 federal election. However, by the time he was declared elected he had left the party. He sat in the Senate as an independent and did not recontest his seat at the 2019 election.

== Early life ==
Timothy Raphael Storer was born in Loxton, South Australia, one of five children of GP Brian Storer and school teacher Jennifer Storer. He studied economics at the University of Adelaide and was dux of his cohort in the Master of Business Administration at the Australian National University.

== Business career ==
Storer was active in state branches of the Australia China Business Council and the Australian Republic Movement. In 1992, Storer moved to Hong Kong at the age of 23, working in publishing and events management, and later moved to Vietnam, working for World Bank. A fluent speaker of Mandarin Chinese, Storer ran a sole proprietorship helping South Australian businesses with Asian trade and investment, having spent twenty years working in China, Hong Kong, and Vietnam.

== Political career ==
From 1996 Storer was a member of the ALP in New South Wales for more than five years before his membership lapsed in 2002. He rejoined the party's Adelaide branch in South Australia in 2013, but quit his party membership in 2015. He characterises each bout of Labor Party membership as being motivated by a desire to promote an Australian republic.

He was the Nick Xenophon Team's fourth and final Senate candidate in South Australia at the 2016 election, which saw the three NXT candidates above Storer elected, two of whom resigned in late 2017. When party leader Nick Xenophon resigned in October 2017, intending to appoint staffer Rex Patrick as his successor, Storer wrote to the Parliament of South Australia claiming he held the right to fill the casual vacancy. One week later, Storer withdrew the challenge and resigned from the party.

NXT Senator Skye Kakoschke-Moore resigned in November 2017 after confirming that she held British citizenship, becoming a casualty of the dual citizenship crisis. The High Court of Australia held that she was invalidly elected, but delayed announcing her successor since the only other candidate on the party list, Storer, had left the party. In February 2018, following a challenge by Kakoschke-Moore to reclaim her seat having renounced her foreign citizenship, the High Court appointed Storer as a senator.

Storer did not support the Coalition's proposed corporate tax cut, later saying that one of his key goals was to increase the Newstart Allowance.

He launched and chaired a parliamentary committee into electric vehicles in Australia, reporting bi-partisan agreed recommendations.

Storer's First Speech outlined four guiding principles of integrity, fairness, prosperity and sustainability, with legislation evaluated on basis of evidence, with no side-deals on unrelated issues.

Storer also introduced Private Senators Bills on Establishment of Social Security Commission, Improving Energy Efficiency in Rental Properties, EPBC Great Australian Bight, and Appointment of ABC Directors. He served on the Select Committee into the Obesity Epidemic and other Senate Inquiries on corporate tax proposals, personal income tax proposals, the ABC’s governance and allegations of political interference, Australia’s energy system, and the Murray Darling Basin Plan.

Storer announced his retirement from politics in April 2019.

== Personal life ==
Storer has two children, and is fluent in Mandarin.

Storer's brother, Jeremy Storer, is married to ABC TV presenter Annabel Crabb.

== Tim Storer Independent SA Party ==
Tim Storer Independent SA Party
- Abbreviation: Tim Storer Independent SA
- Leader: Tim Storer
- Founded: 15 June 2018
- Registered: 30 August 2018
- Dissolved: 21 May 2020
- Split from: Nick Xenophon Team
- Senate: 1 / 76 (2018–2019)

The Tim Storer Independent SA Party was formed by Storer in 2018.

As he was a sitting member of parliament, the party did not require a minimum number of members. The Australian Electoral Commission published a notice on 15 June 2018 calling for any objections to registration of the party to be submitted by 15 July 2018. The associated constitution of the party sets out its guiding principles in section 3. The party was registered on 30 August 2018. It did not stand any candidates in the 2019 Australian federal election, as Storer had announced his intention to retire from politics.

Storer did not support the 26% emissions reduction target of the National Energy Guarantee, arguing that as it is cheap to reduce emissions in the electricity sector, the target should be higher.

The party was voluntarily deregistered in May 2020.
