= Skye Kakoschke-Moore =

Australian politician

Senator for South Australia
- In office 2 July 2016 – 22 November 2017
- Preceded by: Sean Edwards
- Succeeded by: Tim Storer

Personal details
- Born: Skye Louise Kakoschke; 19 December 1985 (age 40) Darwin, Northern Territory, Australia
- Party: Nick Xenophon Team (2013–present)
- Spouse: Simon Moore (m. 2007)
- Children: 1 step-daughter
- Education: American British Academy
- Alma mater: Flinders University
- Occupation: Policy advisor (Senator Nick Xenophon)
- Profession: Advisor politician

Skye Louise Kakoschke-Moore (born 19 December 1985) is an Australian politician who was a Senator for South Australia in the Parliament of Australia from July 2016 until she resigned in November 2017 during the parliamentary eligibility crisis, following her realisation that she was a dual citizen. Kakoschke-Moore had served as Nick Xenophon Team whip and spokesperson for mental health, disability, Indigenous affairs, veteran's affairs, women, arts and sports. She was also the social services spokeswoman for the party in the Senate.

== Background ==
Kakoschke-Moore was born in Darwin before moving with her family to Oman when she was nine years old where her father took up an expatriate role as an air traffic control instructor. She completed an International Baccalaureate at the American British Academy in Muscat, then moved to Adelaide to study law and economics at Flinders University. During her studies, she worked in retail at Myer and volunteered in the legal division of the Australian Refugee Association. In 2008 she represented Australia along with 30 other countries as a facilitator for 'Insight Dubai'—an international leadership conference for women focusing on globalisation, politics, equality and diversity. She married Simon Moore in 2007 and has a step-daughter.

== Political career ==
=== Xenophon staffer ===
In 2010, after completing her university studies, Kakoschke-Moore began working in the Electorate Office of Nick Xenophon. In 2013 she began working as a senior advisor on legal and constituent affairs. She held this position until 2015 when she replaced longtime Xenophon advisor, Hannah Wooller, as the Senator's legislative and policy advisor.

=== Senator for South Australia (2016–2017) ===
In March 2016, NXT announced that Kakoschke-Moore would be the third on the South Australian senate ticket. She was elected to the Senate at the 2016 double dissolution election.

Shortly after her election Kakoschke-Moore negotiated the passage of Carly's Law through the Federal Parliament. The law was named in honour of Carly Ryan, a 15 year old Adelaide student murdered by an online predator in 2007. Carly's Law makes it a criminal offence for an adult to use a carriage service for any act in preparation for, or planning to, harm a child.

In 2017 Kakoschke-Moore re-established a reparation scheme for victims of abuse in the ADF. Under the scheme, victims can apply to the Commonwealth Ombudsman for reparation payments of up to $50,000, access counselling and participate in a Restorative Engagement program.

After participating in the Senate inquiry into suicide by veterans, Kakoschke-Moore advocated for federal government funding for PTSD assistance dogs for veterans. Her campaign was successful and in September 2017 the then-Minister for Veterans' Affairs announced a 4-year, $2 million trial of PTSD Assistance Dogs for veterans.

Kakoschke-Moore was one of nine co-sponsors of the Marriage Amendment (Definition and Religious Freedoms) Bill 2017. As a senator she was prominent on the issue of cyber-bullying, particularly of children who commit suicide as a result. Writing in The Advertiser in October 2017, Kakoschke-Moore argued:

"The scourge of cyberbullying will not be solved overnight. But if as law makers we can respond to senseless and avoidable tragedy by implementing well-considered laws, if we can help to prevent harm to children, then we should do just that."

Kakoschke-Moore resigned from the Senate on 22 November 2017, after learning she was a British citizen by descent, and therefore ineligible under section 44 of the Australian Constitution to be elected to the Australian Parliament due to holding dual citizenship. Her mother had been born in Singapore while it was still a British colony, making her a British citizen. Under the British Nationality Act 1981, Kakoschke-Moore inherited her mother's British citizenship. Upon her resignation, Xenophon said:

"Skye Kakoschke-Moore has done outstanding work and this is not the end of her political career, I think it's the end of a chapter of her political career."

On 13 February 2018, the high court ruled that Kakoschke-Moore could not replace herself as senator in a recount, even though she had renounced her British citizenship.

== Post-politics career ==
Between leaving the Senate and running in the 2019 federal election, Kakoschke-Moore continued as a member of the management committee of NXT's renamed Federal Party - Centre Alliance, and provided governance as a key voting member. She also ran a Cancer Council campaign for bowel cancer research in recognition of an ex-Xenophon staffer, Diana Babich, who died in early 2018. Kakoschke-Moore took up the role of Special Adviser to the global NGO International Justice Mission at the start of 2018, preparing submissions and giving verbal evidence on behalf of the organisation at Parliamentary inquiries into Australia's Foreign Aid Program and the Modern Slavery Bill 2018.

Kakoschke-Moore was preselected to lead the Centre Alliance Senate ticket in South Australia for the 2019 Australian federal election, but was unsuccessful in winning a Senate seat. Kakoschke-Moore is no longer a member of the Centre Alliance management committee.

Kakoschke-Moore is currently the CEO of not-for-profit organisation Children and Young People with Disability Australia (CYDA).
