= Alluvial diagram =

Flow diagram showing change over time

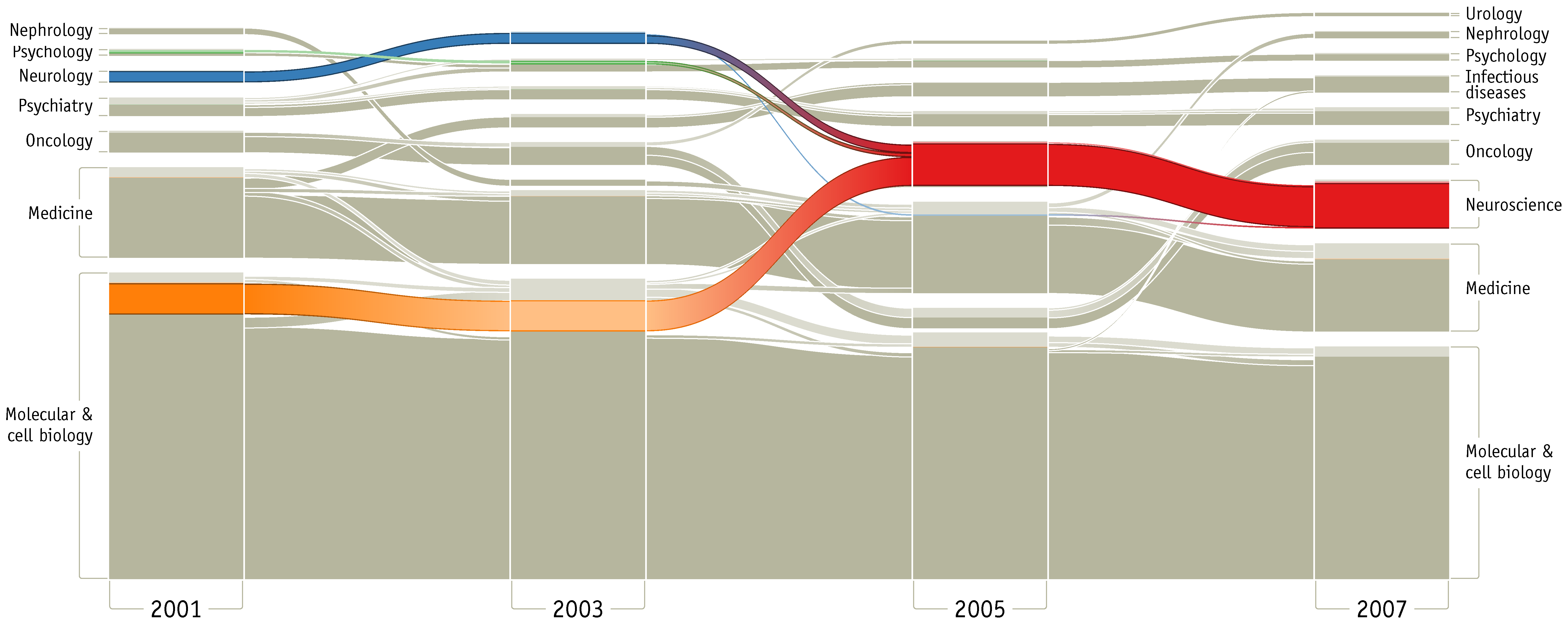
An example of an alluvial diagram that illustrates how the scientific study of neuroscience coalesced from other related disciplines to form its own field.

Alluvial diagrams are a type of flow diagram originally developed to represent changes in network structure over time. In allusion to both their visual appearance and their emphasis on flow, alluvial diagrams are named after alluvial fans that are naturally formed by the soil deposited from streaming water.

== Interpretation ==
In an alluvial diagram, blocks represent clusters of nodes, and stream fields between the blocks represent changes in the composition of these clusters over time. The height of a block represents the size of the cluster and the height of a stream field represents the size of the components contained in both blocks connected by the stream field.

== Application ==
Alluvial diagrams were originally developed to visualize structural change in large complex networks. They can be used to visualize any type of change in group composition between states or over time and include statistical information to reveal significant change. Alluvial diagrams highlight important structural changes that can be further emphasized by color, and make identification of major transitions easy.

Alluvial diagrams can also be used to illustrate patterns of flow on a fixed network over time. The Users Flow feature of Google Analytics uses alluvial diagrams to graphically represent how visitors move among the nodes (individual pages) on a website.

== See also ==
- Sankey diagram
