= Stirling Griff =

Australian politician

Senator for South Australia
- In office 2 July 2016 – 30 June 2022
- Preceded by: Robert Simms
- Succeeded by: Barbara Pocock

Deputy Leader of Nick Xenophon Team
- In office 2 July 2016 – 9 April 2018

Personal details
- Born: 2 December 1957 (age 68) Adelaide, South Australia, Australia
- Party: Centre Alliance
- Occupation: Retail chief executive officer; retail marketing
- Profession: Businessman; politician
- Website: Official website

Stirling Griff (born 2 December 1957) is an Australian former politician who was a Senator for South Australia from 2016 to 2022, representing Centre Alliance. His party changed its name from Nick Xenophon Team (NXT), led by Senator Nick Xenophon, to Centre Alliance in April 2018 after Xenophon ceased to be connected with the party. He served as deputy leader of the party in the Senate until April 2018, when it adopted its current name. He was also the NXT spokesperson for health, immigration and communications. He was defeated at the 2022 federal election, having only secured 3% of the vote. His term expired on 30 June 2022.

== Background ==
Griff was born and raised in South Australia. He is of Jewish Lithuanian descent. He has lived and worked in Adelaide, regional South Australia and Melbourne. He was married to Kristin (died 16 July 2021) and has four children aged 16 to 30 in 2016.

Griff has worked for the Bank of Adelaide, a radio network, Reader's Digest, Young & Rubicam, as a consultant, for the SA branch of the Retail Traders Association (later known as the Australian Retailers Association), and as a retail businessman in telecommunications, owning '3 Mobile' shops. Since 2013 he has been involved with Nick Xenophon, principally as his campaign manager in 2013.

== Political career ==
=== 2013 election and 2016 election ===
During the 2013 federal election campaign, Griff was the campaign director for Nick Xenophon Group (as the party was then known). He also was instrumental in developing a computer program that assisted the campaign. Griff was second on the NXG ticket behind Xenophon. Despite receiving more votes than the Labor Party, only Xenophon managed to win a senate seat. This was because of preference flows against NXG.

Following the establishment of the Nick Xenophon Team as a formal political party, Griff served as party secretary from 2013 to 2014 and party treasurer from 2014 to 2016.

In 2015, Griff was interviewed by the Adelaide-based online newspaper InDaily. The paper declared Griff "the power behind the Xenophon throne". In another article, Griff said he did not support ongoing assistance from the government towards the Australian automotive industry, saying, "I stray a little bit with Nick [Xenophon] on this one". Griff also described how NXT was selecting candidates for the 2016 federal election:

You start bringing in other personalities, if you like, other egos that need stroking…is that going to mean we push the agenda we want to push or are we pushing their agenda? It's not about looking for celebrity candidates; I can tell you we're very strong in our resolve not to go for 'name brands' and celebrity candidates. We want like-minded passionate people … we're not looking for academics, we're not looking for political groupies, we're not looking for people who have been ticket-holding members of parties. We wanted people that have been involved in small business in some form … people that have experienced real life, rather than people that have gone up through a structure being staffers of MPs.

=== Australian Senate (2016–2022) ===
Griff was elected to the Australian Senate at the 2016 federal election, taking his place from September 2016. He was made Deputy Leader of the Nick Xenophon Team in August 2016. In his first speech, Griff called for the public ownership of electricity, water, gas and broadband utilities.

He is reported to be a "strong advocate for emissions reductions".

Griff brokered an ACCC inquiry into digital platforms such as Facebook and Google as a condition of his former party supporting the Turnbull government's media reforms.

During his first term, he supported same-sex marriage.

He also provided support for a ban on health funds paying lower rebates for doctors or dentists who weren't on a 'preferred' list, as well as the disclosure of doctors fees online by the government so that patients can better identify lower-cost services.

Griff supported the federal Territories Rights Euthanasia Bill, stating he has "faith that none of us, no matter our upbringing or faith, desire to see people and particularly those close to us suffer a distressing death."

In June 2018, Griff attended the Rambam Israel Fellowship Program sponsored by the Australia/Israel and Jewish Affairs Council. The lobby group funded "transport, accommodation, meals and other associated costs".

He is interested in health genomics and was the principal advocate for a national Genomic Cancer Medicine Program that will treat more than 5,000 patients nationally. Griff also brokered a deal with the Morrison federal government to secure funding for a $80m South Australian immunoGENomics Cancer Institute (SAiGEN) to complement the Australian Bragg Centre for Proton Therapy, which his party helped secure for SA in 2017.

Griff has a strong interest in preventing in-utero exposure to alcohol, which is known to cause lifelong developmental, physical, mental and behavioural problems and was successful in having the Senate undertake an inquiry into Fetal Alcohol Spectrum Disorder (FASD). He also successfully negotiated a $25m national awareness campaign for FASD.

Griff is a strong advocate for medical transparency, considering that "much of the medical industry operates like a secret society". The IVF industry has been a particular focus where he introduced a bill to ensure reporting of patient outcomes. This bill "spurred the IVF sector to finally start working towards disclosure of success rates for individual clinics".

Griff gave a speech to parliament in February 2020 calling for a motion to ban anime and manga that depicted "child exploitation."

Griff launched the YourIVFSuccess.com.au website in February 2021 after working with the IVF industry for 18 months. The site features a predictor tool and online search capability showing success rates for most IVF clinics in Australia.

Griff introduced a Transparent Patient Outcomes bill into federal parliament in December 2021 that would "empower patients" to make informed decisions on their surgeons before going under the knife. The bill will show the number and type of procedures performed by each surgeon, their mortality and surgical revision rates and other information.

Griff successfully advocated for federal funding to establish an innovative cancer genomics laboratory in South Australia. The former federal Health Minister Greg Hunt acknowledged Senator Griff "for his strong advocacy for this cancer genomics laboratory and his tireless advocacy for cancer research nationally and in South Australia."

Griff ended his parliamentary career at the federal election on 21 May 2022 "in the understated fashion that has become synonymous with his many victories as a powerful crossbencher."

He also helped the media industry by instigating the ACCC Digital Platforms inquiry that brought tech giants Google and Facebook into line.

== Post-politics ==
Since retiring from politics, Griff has focused on his family and personal business interests and continues to advocate for positive community outcomes in the prevention, diagnostic, research and palliative care health spheres.

=== Palliative Care Advocacy ===
In May 2023, the federal Minister for Health announced funding for a South Australian Palliative Care Navigation Pilot, acknowledging Griff for initiating this pilot.

The pilot aims to increase access to palliative care services in the community by providing patients and their families with better information about available services, smoother transitions between types of care, and better support in end-of-life care pathways.

The program will also create better links between primary health networks, specialist palliative care services, and relevant community-based services. Providing better-coordinated care will directly contribute to the goals of the National Palliative Care Strategy and the National Health Reform Agreement.

=== South Australian immunoGEnomics Cancer Institute (SAiGENCI) ===
Griff was appointed as a Commonwealth Government representative on the SAiGENCI Advisory Board. SAiGENCI is an academic unit linked to the University of Adelaide's Faculty of Health and Medical Sciences.
