= Centre Alliance =

Centrist political party in Australia

- Abbreviation: CA
- Founder: Nick Xenophon
- Founded: 1 July 2013; 13 years ago
- Preceded by: No Pokies
- Headquarters: Adelaide, South Australia
- Ideology: Social liberalism; Populism; South Australian regionalism
- Political position: Centre
- Colours: Black; Orange; Light orange (customary)
- Slogan: Working in South Australia's interests
- House of Representatives: 1 / 150
- Senate: 0 / 76

Website
- centrealliance.org.au

Centre Alliance (CA), formerly known as the Nick Xenophon Team (NXT), is a centrist and social liberal Australian political party based in the state of South Australia. It currently has one elected representative, Rebekha Sharkie in the House of Representatives; since 2022 she has been the party's only candidate, describing herself as "a party of one", and citing savings in the party account as the main reason for her not to run as an independent.

Since its founding in July 2013, the party has twice changed names. At the time of the 2016 federal election, it was known as the Nick Xenophon Team. After Nick Xenophon founded SA Best, an affiliated state-based party, NXT sought to change its name to SA-BEST (Federal). However, prior to Australian Electoral Commission approval, Xenophon left politics, and the party withdrew its application and changed its name to Centre Alliance. In 2018, Centre Alliance senator Stirling Griff stated that SA Best is "a separate entity, a separate association, a separate party" from Centre Alliance.

The party's ideological focus is a combination of culturally liberal and populist policies, drawing from the positions of Xenophon. Its present members have variously declared support for same-sex marriage, reform of the Australian Intelligence Community, action on climate change, support for military veterans, affordable tax cuts, Australian-made manufacturing (including defence-industry spending), and legalising euthanasia.

== History ==
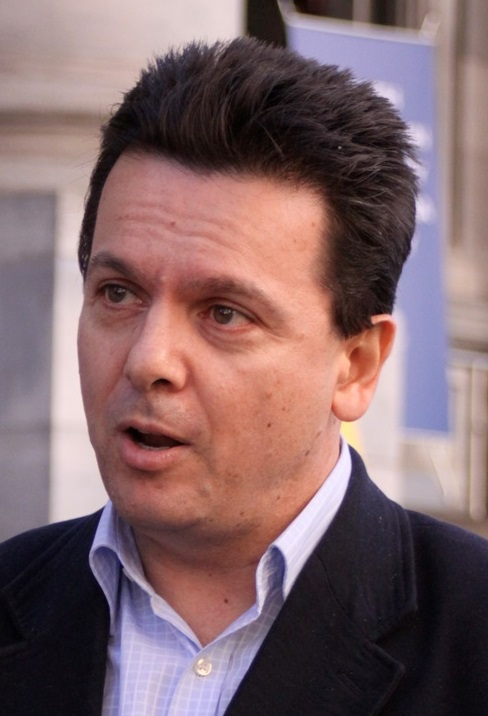
Nick Xenophon in 2009

Nick Xenophon ran for election as an independent candidate in Australia under a "No Pokies" ticket that ran in South Australian state elections from 1997 to 2006. He was elected in 1997 and 2006. The 2013 Australian federal election saw independent "Nick Xenophon Group", with Xenophon as the lead candidate, win 24.9 percent of the statewide upper house vote in South Australia. This was an unprecedented result for a non-major party with Nick Xenophon Group outpolling the Australian Labor Party to come in second behind the Liberal Party of Australia, which won office. Although Xenophon was re-elected, his running mate Stirling Griff narrowly missed out to Bob Day of the Family First Party.

In 2014, Nick Xenophon Team (NXT) emerged from Nick Xenophon Group. Its management committee was composed of Xenophon, John Darley, Griff, and Connie Bonaros.

In the 2014 South Australian state election, John Darley, who took Nick Xenophon's place in the state parliament in 2007, ran under the banner of Independent Nick Xenophon Team. Without Xenophon as a candidate, being in the national senate, John Darley won 12.9 percent of the statewide upper house vote. John Darley, who was appointed in 2007 to succeed Xenophon for "No Pokies", was re-elected.

On 5 March 2017, Xenophon announced that he would launch a new party in South Australia in time for the March 2018 state election to enable them to focus on domestic South Australian issues as opposed to wider Australia. The party was registered on 4 July as Nick Xenophon's SA-BEST.

The independent John Darley left the management committee of the Nick Xenophon Team party on 17 August 2017 to avoid expulsion from the party. He said: "There are many things I could say as to why I have resigned. However, it is not my place to speak publicly about internal party matters". Though it was stated that there had been months of conflict between Darley and the party, it came to a head a week prior when Darley voted with the Labor government to back Legislative Council voting reforms. Xenophon indicated the resignation had averted Darley's imminent expulsion from the party due to "breaches to party rules". Nick Xenophon's SA-BEST therefore contested the 2018 election without state parliamentary representation.

The party submitted an application to change its name, abbreviation and logo to SA-BEST (Federal) to the Australian Electoral Commission in February 2018. The application was open for public objection until 7 March 2018 before a decision would be made, but on 9 April 2018 the Electoral Commission announced that the application had been withdrawn. Party supporters were advised on 10 April that a new application had been lodged to change the name to Centre Alliance. The application to change the name and logo was advertised for objection by the Australian Electoral Commission on 7 May 2018. Xenophon himself ceased to be directly involved with the party. The name and logo change were registered by the electoral commission on 8 June 2018.

In August 2020, Senator Rex Patrick left the party, and went on to form the Rex Patrick Team.

By 2025, the party only had one member, Rebekha Sharkie, who identifies as an Independent politician. Sharkie remains in the party, rather than becoming an independent politician, due to complexities around savings held within party bank accounts.

== Political positions ==
Centre Alliance is generally perceived as a social liberal, populist, and centrist. Some prominent party members are former Liberal Party members or staffers. Senator Rex Patrick was a staffer for Liberal Senator David Johnston before joining the party. Federal MP Rebekha Sharkie is also a former member of the Liberal Party and formerly worked as a researcher and staffer for Liberal party figures from 2006. At the 2016 Federal Election Rebekha Sharkie won the lower house seat of Mayo, previously a safe Liberal seat. Sharkie's win delivered the party's first and only seat in the House of Representatives.

In October 2020, Centre Alliance supported the government's university reform bill. The government stated that: “(the) reforms will create 30,000 (university) places next year, while cheaper fees in certain fields will deliver more graduates in areas of expected job growth”. The student cost of humanities, law and commerce degrees increased, while teaching, nursing, English, languages, maths, agriculture, science, health, architecture, environmental science, IT and engineering degrees decreased.

== 2016 federal election ==
=== Candidates ===
The selection process for NXT candidates at the 2016 federal election was called "exhaustive", with senate candidate for South Australia and campaign manager Stirling Griff being largely responsible. In a later article, however, Richardson called it "a two-man team" of selectors (Griff and Xenophon). According to Griff, NXT aimed to field candidates that had "real life experience" as opposed to "celebrities [...] academics [...] [or] political groupies". These comments were reflected in the composition of NXT candidates for the election, with one third of them coming from a small business, grassroots background.

Xenophon confirmed in December 2014 that by mid-2015 Nick Xenophon Team would announce candidates in the South Australian Liberal seats of Sturt, Hindmarsh and Mayo, along with seats in all states and territories, and preference against the government in the upper house, at the 2016 federal election, with Xenophon citing the government's ambiguity on the Collins class submarine replacement project as motivation.

NXT fielded two senate candidates in every state, with four in South Australia. It fielded candidates in all eleven of the South Australian House of Representatives seats, along with Calare, Lindsay, Macarthur and Warringah in New South Wales, Groom and Moreton in Queensland and Higgins in Victoria.

=== Polling ===
In June 2014, polling in the seat of Sturt held by Christopher Pyne–a major figure in the Liberal Party–indicated that an NXT candidate would have beaten him 38% to 31% in primary vote. This was before Tony Abbott was replaced by Malcolm Turnbull as Prime Minister following the September 2015 Liberal leadership ballot. A January 2016 opinion poll conducted in South Australia by Roy Morgan found that NXT was slightly ahead of the Australian Labor Party, which was the opposition party to the governing Liberal Party of Australia. A February poll for the next South Australian Election indicated a similar amount of support (20.5%), but with NXT third behind Labor. ABC election analyst Antony Green believes that NXT could attract some 10-12% of the vote in the eastern states. Griff believes that a double dissolution election could see as many as six NXT senators elected. A 15 January 2016 article in the Sydney Morning Herald argued that NXT's debut national election had been undermined by the rise of Turnbull. However, polling conducted after the change of Prime Minister indicated NXT support had only fallen by 0.2% in votes for the lower house, while support rose by 4% in the Senate.

Multiple seat-level opinion polls in the South Australian rural Liberal seats of Mayo, Grey and Barker during the 2016 election campaign found NXT leading the Liberals on the two-candidate vote in all three seats. ABC psephologist Antony Green indicated NXT had a "strong chance of winning lower house seats and three or four Senate seats".

=== Relationship with the Liberal Party ===
Centre Alliance has attracted strong criticism from the Liberal Party. In 2015, soon after becoming prime minister, Malcolm Turnbull intimated that NXT would struggle to overcome the deficiencies of its leader, adding "Nick’s track record to date is that when he last ran with a running mate, he and Ann Bressington split up". Education Minister Simon Birmingham attacked NXT candidate for the seat of Mayo, Rebekha Sharkie, for seeking the support of a farming group who had previously supported One Nation founder Pauline Hanson. Xenophon rejected these claims as the group in question had not endorsed One Nation, but merely spoke "at an event".

In 2016, Martin Hamilton-Smith, a former South Australian Liberal leader who had left the Liberal party, and at the time was an independent and part of the state Labor cabinet, declared his support for the NXT candidate Rebekha Sharkie in Mayo for the upcoming federal election. He said "I think Rebekha's a good candidate for Mayo, I live in Mayo so I want a candidate that's going to stick up for SA and the local district and I think she's the right person". He also stated that he was not considering a run with NXT in the future, rather believed that the NXT candidate was the best person for the job in his electorate. Sharkie's main opponent in Mayo, sitting Liberal member Jamie Briggs said, "I think what it reveals is you just can't trust these independents".

=== 2016 election campaign ===
Primary vote % (SA 2016)

- Division of Mayo: 34.9% (won)
- Division of Barker: 29.1%
- Division of Grey: 27.8%
- Division of Sturt: 21.2%
- Division of Boothby: 20.7%
- Division of Wakefield: 20.4%
- Division of Port Adelaide: 18.7%
- Division of Kingston: 17.2%
- Division of Makin: 16.6%
- Division of Hindmarsh: 15.1%
- Division of Adelaide: 12.9%
- House (SA): 21.3% (1 seat won)
- Senate (SA): 21.7% (3 seats won)

The nascent Nick Xenophon Team ran candidates at the Australian 2016 federal election for the upper house with two candidates in each of the six states, a candidate in all eleven lower house seats in South Australia, and additionally a candidate in seven lower house seats in three other states – Calare, Lindsay, Macarthur and Warringah in New South Wales, Groom and Moreton in Queensland, and Higgins in Victoria. As the election was a double dissolution the Senate electoral quota of 14.3 percent was reduced to 7.7 percent.

During the campaign, Xenophon and the NXT were the subject of numerous attacks from both major political parties. This included an attack levelled at his failure to declare a directorship of Adelaide Tower Pty Ltd, which involved his father. Xenophon accused proponents of this attack of a "partisan and personal campaign". Labor requested the Australian Electoral Commission investigate questionable loans given to Xenophon by businessman Ian Melrose.

In the presence of NXT candidates in all eleven South Australian seats, both major parties recorded a suppressed primary vote, resulting in a reduction of the major party primary vote in all but one South Australian seat. Though Labor picked up a two-party swing in all eleven, NXT's presence produced a result where Kingston ended up as the only South Australian seat to record an increase to a major party primary vote. Kingston also recorded the highest major party primary vote of just 49 percent. In NXT's presence, no party won a majority of the primary vote in any of the eleven seats. NXT's lower house primary vote was highest in Mayo (34.9%) and lowest in Adelaide (12.9%). While Mayo has always polled strongest for minor parties, Adelaide's result is in contrast to 2007 where the Xenophon Senate ticket polled better in Adelaide than in most other seats. NXT candidates in Barker and Grey both placed second to the Liberal incumbents and placed second in Port Adelaide to the Labor incumbent. NXT's South Australian lower house vote was 21.3 percent. NXT did not poll as highly in other states. The overall nationwide NXT primary vote was 3.3 percent (456,369 votes) in the Senate and 1.9 percent (250,333 votes) in the House. Though NXT's South Australian Senate primary vote was reduced to 21.7 percent (–3.1 from 2013), the reduced Senate quota allowed more candidates to be successful.

In the end, three NXT senators and one lower house MP were elected. In the senate, Xenophon and Stirling Griff were elected to six-year terms, and Skye Kakoschke-Moore was elected for a three-year term; while Rebekha Sharkie won the lower house seat of Mayo.

Xenophon resigned from the Senate in 2017 and was replaced by Rex Patrick. Kakoschke-Moore resigned from the Senate in 2017 and was replaced by Tim Storer, although Storer had resigned from the party at that stage, so sat as an independent.

== 2019 federal election ==
Skye Kakoschke-Moore was announced as the lead Senate candidate for the 2019 election. Rebekha Sharkie was announced as the candidate for Mayo. Kelly Gladigau was announced as the candidate for Barker. Andrea Broadfoot was announced as the candidate for Grey.

The SA Senate vote collapsed from 21.8% to 2.6%, and no Centre Alliance senator was elected. Stirling Griff and Rex Patrick kept their Senate seats, because they were not up for re-election.

Rebekha Sharkie was the only Centre Alliance candidate elected, retaining the seat of Mayo with 34.19% of the primary vote, and a two-party preferred vote of 55.14%.

== 2022 federal election ==
The Centre Alliance ran only one candidate in the 2022 federal election, Rebekha Sharkie in the seat of Mayo. She was re-elected.

Stirling Griff, while remaining with the party, ran as an independent "Group O" candidate for the Senate, in a ticket led by Nick Xenophon. Both were unsuccessful.

Rex Patrick, elected to the Senate with the party in 2016, left the party in August 2020. He ran as the lead candidate of the Rex Patrick Team, but failed to win re-election.

== Election results ==
House of Representatives (South Australia)
Election	Leader	Candidates	Seats won	±	Total votes	%
2016	Nick Xenophon	11 / 11	1 / 11	▲1	221,210	21.26%
2019	None	3 / 10	1 / 10	Steady	46,931	4.38%
2022	None	1 / 10	1 / 10	Steady	36,500	3.32%
2025	None	1 / 10	1 / 10	Steady	37,453	3.31%

Senate (South Australia)
Election	Leader	Seats won	Total seats	±	Total votes	%
2013	Nick Xenophon	1 / 6	1 / 12	▲1	258,376	24.88%
2016	Nick Xenophon	3 / 12	3 / 12	▲2	230,866	21.76%
2019	None	0 / 6	2 / 12	▼1	28,416	2.60%
2022	None	0 / 6	0 / 12	▼2	0	0%

== List of parliamentarians ==
=== Current ===
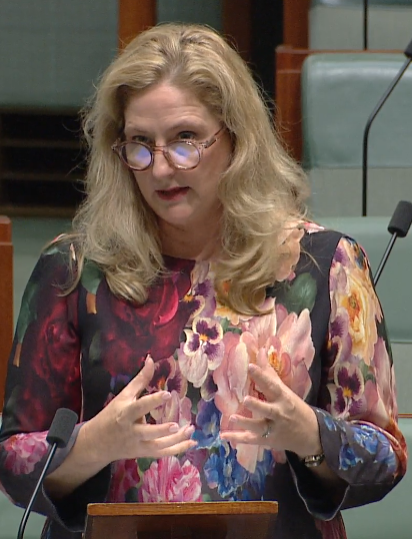
Rebekha Sharkie MP (Mayo, SA) 2016–2018, 2018–present

=== Former ===
==== Federal ====
- Senator Nick Xenophon (SA), 2008–2017; re-elected in 2013 and 2016, announced resignation in 2017
- Senator Skye Kakoschke-Moore (SA), 2016–2017; resigned in 2017 due to dual citizenship; previous spokesperson for mental health, veterans affairs, and women
- Senator Rex Patrick (SA), 2017–2020; defected from the party in August 2020 to sit as an independent, defeated at the 2022 federal election.
- Senator Stirling Griff (SA), 2016–2022; spokesperson for health, immigration and communications. Defeated at the 2022 federal election.

==== South Australia ====
- John Darley MLC, 2007–2017 (re-elected in 2014, became an independent in 2017)

== See also ==
- 1997 South Australian state election
- 2006 South Australian state election
- 2007 Australian federal election
- 2013 Australian federal election
- 2016 Australian federal election
- 2019 Australian federal election
- 2022 Australian federal election
- 2025 Australian federal election
