= Tony Pasin =

Australian politician (born 1977)

Tony Pasin MP

Member of the Australian Parliament for Barker
- Incumbent
- Assumed office 7 September 2013
- Preceded by: Patrick Secker

Personal details
- Born: 1 October 1977 (age 49) Mount Gambier, South Australia
- Party: Liberal
- Spouse: Fiona Lee
- Children: 2
- Education: Flinders University
- Profession: Solicitor

Antony "Tony" Pasin (born 1 October 1977) is an Australian politician. He is a member of the Liberal Party of Australia for the House of Representatives seat of Barker since the 2013 election.

== Early life ==
Pasin was born in Mount Gambier, South Australia. His parents were both born in Italy – his mother in San Bartolomeo in Galdo, Benevento, and his father in Fontanelle, Veneto. Pasin has degrees in Law and Economics from Flinders University, and previously served on the Mount Gambier City Council from 2003 to 2010.

== Parliament ==
In 2012, Pasin defeated incumbent Patrick Secker, 164 votes to 78 votes, for Liberal preselection in Barker, long the safest Liberal seat in South Australia. He had a comfortable victory at the 2013 election.

=== 2016 election ===
A ReachTEL seat-level opinion poll in the safe Liberal seat of Barker of 869 voters conducted by robocall on 20 June during the 2016 election campaign surprisingly found Nick Xenophon Team candidate James Stacey leading Pasin 52–48 on the two-candidate vote. Seat-level opinion polls in the other two rural Liberal South Australian seats of Mayo and Grey revealed Nick Xenophon Team also leading in both.

On election night, Stacey slashed Pasin's margin in Barker from a comfortably safe 16.5 points to just 4.7 points. This was the closest that the Coalition has come to losing Barker since 1943, though Barker remains a comfortably safe Liberal seat in a two-party matchup with Labor.

Pasin is a member of the National Right faction of the Liberal Party. Pasin is a powerbroker in the faction and is seen as Senator Alex Antic’s right-hand man. Pasin also has the shadow portfolio of Shadow Assistant Minister for Infrastructure and Transport in the Dutton Shadow cabinet.

== Personal life ==
Pasin supports the Essendon Bombers in the Australian Football League.

Parliament of Australia
Preceded by Patrick Secker	Member for Barker; 2013–present	Incumbent
