= Electoral results for the Division of Mayo =

Australian division election results

This is a list of electoral results for the Division of Mayo in Australian federal elections from the division's creation in 1984 until the present.

== Members ==
Member	Party	Term
Alexander Downer	Liberal	1984–2008
Jamie Briggs	Liberal	2008 by–2016
Rebekha Sharkie	Xenophon	2016–2018
Rebekha Sharkie	Centre Alliance	2018–present

== Election results ==
=== Elections in the 2020s ===
==== 2025 ====
2025 Australian federal election: Mayo
Party	Candidate	Votes	%	±%
Centre Alliance	Rebekha Sharkie	37,453	29.92	−1.49
Liberal	Zane Basic	29,551	23.61	−3.42
Labor	Marisa Bell	26,718	21.34	+3.23
Greens	Genevieve Dawson-Scott	17,048	13.62	+1.83
One Nation	Rebecca Hewett	7,493	5.99	+1.88
Trumpet of Patriots	Simeon Bidwell	3,522	2.81	+1.67
Family First	Ben Hackett	3,397	2.71	+2.71
Total formal votes		125,182	96.45	+1.50
Informal votes		4,603	3.55	−1.50
Turnout		129,785	94.17	+0.49
Notional two-party-preferred count
Labor	Marisa Bell	68,820	54.98	+3.39
Liberal	Zane Basic	56,362	45.02	−3.39
Two-candidate-preferred result
Centre Alliance	Rebekha Sharkie	81,231	64.89	+2.63
Labor	Marisa Bell	43,951	35.11	+35.11
Centre Alliance hold		Swing	+2.63	

==== 2022 ====
2022 Australian federal election: Mayo
Party	Candidate	Votes	%	±%
Centre Alliance	Rebekha Sharkie	36,500	31.41	−2.78
Liberal	Allison Bluck	31,411	27.03	−10.62
Labor	Marisa Bell	21,051	18.11	+4.45
Greens	Greg Elliott	13,705	11.79	+2.53
One Nation	Tonya Scott	4,775	4.11	+4.11
United Australia	Samantha McGrail	4,089	3.52	+0.33
Animal Justice	Padma Chaplin	1,929	1.66	−0.38
Liberal Democrats	Jacob van Raalte	1,424	1.23	+1.23
Federation	Mark Neugebauer	1,330	1.14	+1.14
Total formal votes		116,214	94.95	−2.00
Informal votes		6,176	5.05	+2.00
Turnout		122,390	93.68	−1.29
Notional two-party-preferred count
Labor	Marisa Bell	59,955	51.59	+4.13
Liberal	Allison Bluck	56,259	48.41	−4.13
Two-candidate-preferred result
Centre Alliance	Rebekha Sharkie	72,355	62.26	+7.12
Liberal	Allison Bluck	43,859	37.74	−7.12
Centre Alliance hold		Swing	+7.12	

Alluvial diagram for preference flows in the seat of Mayo in the 2022 federal election. indicates at what stage the winning candidate had over 50% of the votes and was declared the winner.

=== Elections in the 2010s ===
==== 2019 ====
2019 Australian federal election: Mayo
Party	Candidate	Votes	%	±%
Liberal	Georgina Downer	42,426	37.65	+1.03
Centre Alliance	Rebekha Sharkie	38,525	34.19	+1.27
Labor	Saskia Gerhardy	15,390	13.66	−3.03
Greens	Anne Bourne	10,436	9.26	+1.12
United Australia	Michael Cane	3,597	3.19	+3.19
Animal Justice	Helen Dowland	2,302	2.04	+1.97
Total formal votes		112,676	96.95	−0.06
Informal votes		3,540	3.05	+0.06
Turnout		116,216	94.97	+2.25
Notional two-party-preferred count
Liberal	Georgina Downer	59,205	52.54	−0.73
Labor	Saskia Gerhardy	53,471	47.46	+0.73
Two-candidate-preferred result
Centre Alliance	Rebekha Sharkie	62,124	55.14	−2.22
Liberal	Georgina Downer	50,552	44.86	+2.22
Centre Alliance hold		Swing	−2.22	

==== 2018 ====
2018 Mayo by-election
Party	Candidate	Votes	%	±%
Centre Alliance	Rebekha Sharkie	39,369	44.37	+9.51
Liberal	Georgina Downer	33,219	37.44	−0.32
Greens	Major Sumner	7,898	8.90	+0.85
Labor	Reg Coutts	5,370	6.05	−7.47
Christian Democrats	Tracey-Lee Cane	1,348	1.52	+1.52
Liberal Democrats	Stephen Humble	809	0.91	−0.30
People's Party	Kelsie Harfouche	716	0.81	+0.81
Total formal votes		88,729	96.47	−0.64
Informal votes		3,246	3.53	+0.64
Turnout		91,975	85.52	−8.67
Two-party-preferred result
Liberal	Georgina Downer	49,375	55.65	+0.30
Labor	Reg Coutts	39,354	44.35	−0.30
Two-candidate-preferred result
Centre Alliance	Rebekha Sharkie	51,042	57.53	+2.56
Liberal	Georgina Downer	37,687	42.47	−2.56
Centre Alliance hold		Swing	+2.56	

==== 2016 ====
2016 Australian federal election: Mayo
Party	Candidate	Votes	%	±%
Liberal	Jamie Briggs	35,915	37.76	−16.06
Xenophon	Rebekha Sharkie	33,158	34.86	+34.86
Labor	Glen Dallimore	12,859	13.52	−7.62
Greens	Nathan Daniell	7,661	8.05	−6.10
Family First	Bruce Hicks	4,375	4.60	−2.54
Liberal Democrats	Luke Dzivinski	1,148	1.21	+1.21
Total formal votes		95,116	97.11	+0.98
Informal votes		2,828	2.89	−0.98
Turnout		97,944	94.19	−0.41
Notional two-party-preferred count
Liberal	Jamie Briggs	52,650	55.35	−7.16
Labor	Glen Dallimore	42,466	44.65	+7.16
Two-candidate-preferred result
Xenophon	Rebekha Sharkie	52,283	54.97	+54.97
Liberal	Jamie Briggs	42,833	45.03	−17.18
Xenophon gain from Liberal		Swing	N/A	

==== 2013 ====
2013 Australian federal election: Mayo
Party	Candidate	Votes	%	±%
Liberal	Jamie Briggs	49,195	53.82	+6.94
Labor	Norah Fahy	19,325	21.14	−4.05
Greens	Ian Grosser	12,931	14.15	−2.86
Family First	Bruce Hicks	6,525	7.14	+1.39
Palmer United	Bikkar Singh Brar	3,434	3.76	+3.76
Total formal votes		91,410	96.13	+0.56
Informal votes		3,684	3.87	−0.56
Turnout		95,094	94.60	+0.14
Two-party-preferred result
Liberal	Jamie Briggs	57,141	62.51	+5.22
Labor	Norah Fahy	34,269	37.49	−5.22
Liberal hold		Swing	+5.22	

==== 2010 ====
2010 Australian federal election: Mayo
Party	Candidate	Votes	%	±%
Liberal	Jamie Briggs	42,976	46.76	−4.32
Labor	Sam Davis	22,997	25.02	−6.10
Greens	Diane Atkinson	15,593	16.97	+6.01
Family First	Bruce Hicks	5,337	5.81	+1.79
Stop Population Growth Now	Bill Spragg	2,404	2.62	+2.62
Independent Protectionist	Andrew Phillips	993	1.08	+1.08
Democrats	Rebekkah Osmond	948	1.03	−0.49
Climate Sceptics	John Michelmore	655	0.71	+0.71
Total formal votes		91,903	95.42	−1.82
Informal votes		4,414	4.58	+1.82
Turnout		96,317	94.83	−1.05
Two-party-preferred result
Liberal	Jamie Briggs	52,702	57.35	+0.29
Labor	Sam Davis	39,201	42.65	−0.29
Liberal hold		Swing	+0.29	

=== Elections in the 2000s ===
==== 2008 by-election ====
2008 Mayo by-election
Party	Candidate	Votes	%	±%
Liberal	Jamie Briggs	30,651	41.28	–9.80
Greens	Lynton Vonow	15,851	21.35	+10.39
Independent	Di Bell	12,081	16.27	+16.27
Family First	Bob Day	8,468	11.40	+7.38
Independent	Mary Brewerton	1,868	2.52	+2.52
Independent	Bill Spragg	1,545	2.08	+2.08
Democratic Labor	David McCabe	1,426	1.92	+1.92
Democrats	Andrew Castrique	923	1.24	–0.28
Climate Conservatives	Rachael Barons	725	0.98	–0.32
One Nation	Mathew Keizer	503	0.68	+0.68
Independent	Malcolm Ronald King	219	0.29	+0.29
Total formal votes		74,260	95.01	–2.23
Informal votes		3,900	4.99	+2.23
Turnout		78,160	80.10	–15.78
Two-candidate-preferred result
Liberal	Jamie Briggs	39,381	53.03	–4.03
Greens	Lynton Vonow	34,879	46.97	+46.97
Liberal hold				

==== 2007 ====
2007 Australian federal election: Mayo
Party	Candidate	Votes	%	±%
Liberal	Alexander Downer	45,893	51.08	−2.56
Labor	Mary Brewerton	27,957	31.12	+14.63
Greens	Lynton Vonow	9,849	10.96	+3.36
Family First	Trish Nolan	3,615	4.02	+0.37
Democrats	Andrew Castrique	1,369	1.52	−0.29
Climate Conservatives	Rachael Barons	1,165	1.30	+1.30
Total formal votes		89,848	97.24	+1.88
Informal votes		2,550	2.76	−1.88
Turnout		92,398	95.85	+0.64
Two-party-preferred result
Liberal	Alexander Downer	51,264	57.06	−6.53
Labor	Mary Brewerton	38,584	42.94	+42.94
Liberal hold		Swing	–6.53	

==== 2004 ====
2004 Australian federal election: Mayo
Party	Candidate	Votes	%	±%
Liberal	Alexander Downer	44,520	53.64	+0.01
Labor	James Murphy	13,689	16.49	−3.26
Independent	Brian Deegan	12,577	15.15	+15.15
Greens	Dennis Matthews	6,305	7.60	+2.13
Family First	Kevin Cramp	3,027	3.65	+3.65
Democrats	Kathy Brazher-de Laine	1,505	1.81	−11.90
One Nation	Robert Fechner	774	0.93	−3.27
Independent	Jon Grear	606	0.73	+0.73
Total formal votes		83,003	95.36	+0.30
Informal votes		4,039	4.64	−0.30
Turnout		87,042	95.21	+0.56
Notional two-party-preferred count
Liberal	Alexander Downer	52,780	63.59	−0.72
Labor	James Murphy	30,223	36.41	+0.72
Two-candidate-preferred result
Liberal	Alexander Downer	51,303	61.81	−2.49
Independent	Brian Deegan	31,700	38.19	+38.19
Liberal hold		Swing	N/A	

==== 2001 ====
2001 Australian federal election: Mayo
Party	Candidate	Votes	%	±%
Liberal	Alexander Downer	41,259	52.76	+6.45
Labor	Delia Brennan	16,269	20.80	−0.73
Democrats	John McLaren	11,607	14.84	−6.98
Greens	Dave Clark	4,084	5.22	+5.22
One Nation	Mike Thomas	2,366	3.03	−4.52
Independent	Bill Spragg	2,307	2.95	+2.95
Independent	Howie Coombe	310	0.40	−0.25
Total formal votes		78,202	94.51	−1.59
Informal votes		4,544	5.49	+1.59
Turnout		82,746	96.19	
Two-party-preferred result
Liberal	Alexander Downer	49,162	62.87	+2.97
Labor	Delia Brennan	29,040	37.13	−2.97
Liberal hold		Swing	N/A	

=== Elections in the 1990s ===
==== 1998 ====
1998 Australian federal election: Mayo
Party	Candidate	Votes	%	±%
Liberal	Alexander Downer	38,246	45.64	−11.37
Democrats	John Schumann	18,791	22.43	+9.99
Labor	Jade Evans	18,290	21.83	−3.34
One Nation	Lee Peacock	6,146	7.33	+7.33
Christian Democrats	Ian Wynn	1,360	1.62	+1.62
Independent	Howie Coombe	598	0.71	+0.71
Natural Law	Anthony Coombe	360	0.43	−0.16
Total formal votes		83,791	96.15	−0.73
Informal votes		3,353	3.85	+0.73
Turnout		87,144	95.91	−0.27
Notional two-party-preferred count
Liberal	Alexander Downer	50,189	59.90	−5.26
Labor	Jade Evans	33,602	40.10	+5.26
Two-candidate-preferred result
Liberal	Alexander Downer	43,354	51.74	−13.42
Democrats	John Schumann	40,437	48.26	+48.26
Liberal hold		Swing	N/A	

==== 1996 ====
1996 Australian federal election: Mayo
Party	Candidate	Votes	%	±%
Liberal	Alexander Downer	46,920	57.02	+3.04
Labor	Peter Louca	20,714	25.17	−2.16
Democrats	Cathi Tucker-Lee	10,230	12.43	−1.15
Greens	David Mussared	2,848	3.46	+3.46
Independent	Graham Craig	1,089	1.32	+1.32
Natural Law	Anthony Coombe	488	0.59	−0.94
Total formal votes		82,289	96.89	+0.25
Informal votes		2,645	3.11	−0.25
Turnout		84,934	96.18	+1.00
Two-party-preferred result
Liberal	Alexander Downer	53,194	65.16	+4.56
Labor	Peter Louca	28,441	34.84	−4.56
Liberal hold		Swing	+4.56	

==== 1993 ====
1993 Australian federal election: Mayo
Party	Candidate	Votes	%	±%
Liberal	Alexander Downer	42,647	53.98	+3.43
Labor	Patrick Scott	21,601	27.33	+0.42
Democrats	Merilyn Pedrick	10,731	13.58	−5.81
Independent	Elena Lomsargis	1,322	1.67	+1.67
Natural Law	Pamela Chipperfield	1,209	1.53	+1.53
Call to Australia	Philippe Bayet	988	1.25	−1.09
Independent	Michael Camilleri	523	0.66	+0.66
Total formal votes		79,031	96.64	−0.23
Informal votes		2,751	3.36	+0.23
Turnout		81,782	95.18	
Two-party-preferred result
Liberal	Alexander Downer	47,827	60.60	+1.01
Labor	Patrick Scott	31,097	39.40	−1.01
Liberal hold		Swing	+1.01	

==== 1990 ====
1990 Australian federal election: Mayo
Party	Candidate	Votes	%	±%
Liberal	Alexander Downer	39,037	52.5	−1.5
Labor	Delia Skorin	17,584	23.6	−6.7
Democrats	Merilyn Pedrick	15,817	21.3	+11.7
Call to Australia	John Watson	1,937	2.6	+2.6
Total formal votes		74,375	96.9	
Informal votes		2,359	3.1	
Turnout		76,734	96.2	
Two-party-preferred result
Liberal	Alexander Downer	45,737	61.6	−1.1
Labor	Delia Skorin	28,479	38.4	+1.1
Liberal hold		Swing	−1.1	

=== Elections in the 1980s ===
==== 1987 ====
1987 Australian federal election: Mayo
Party	Candidate	Votes	%	±%
Liberal	Alexander Downer	35,040	54.0	+1.6
Labor	Delia Skorin	19,685	30.3	−3.7
Democrats	Merilyn Pedrick	6,246	9.6	+0.5
National	Wesley Glanville	2,550	3.9	−0.5
Unite Australia	Dorothy McGregory-Dey	783	1.2	+1.2
Independent	George Gater	607	0.9	+0.9
Total formal votes		64,911	94.1	
Informal votes		4,100	5.9	
Turnout		69,011	93.6	
Two-party-preferred result
Liberal	Alexander Downer	40,656	62.6	+2.2
Labor	Delia Skorin	24,243	37.4	−2.2
Liberal hold		Swing	+2.2	

==== 1984 ====
1984 Australian federal election: Mayo
Party	Candidate	Votes	%	±%
Liberal	Alexander Downer	31,131	52.4	−3.5
Labor	John Quirke	20,194	34.0	+1.0
Democrats	Donald Chisholm	5,424	9.1	+0.8
National	Bob Shearer	2,620	4.4	+4.4
Total formal votes		59,369	92.2	
Informal votes		5,030	7.8	
Turnout		64,399	95.1	
Two-party-preferred result
Liberal	Alexander Downer	35,922	60.5	−1.8
Labor	John Quirke	23,436	39.5	+1.8
Liberal notional hold		Swing	−1.8	
