= 2016 Australian Senate election =

2016 Australian federal election (Senate)
- 2 July 2016

All 76 seats in the Australian Senate 39 seats needed for a majority
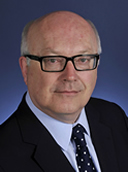

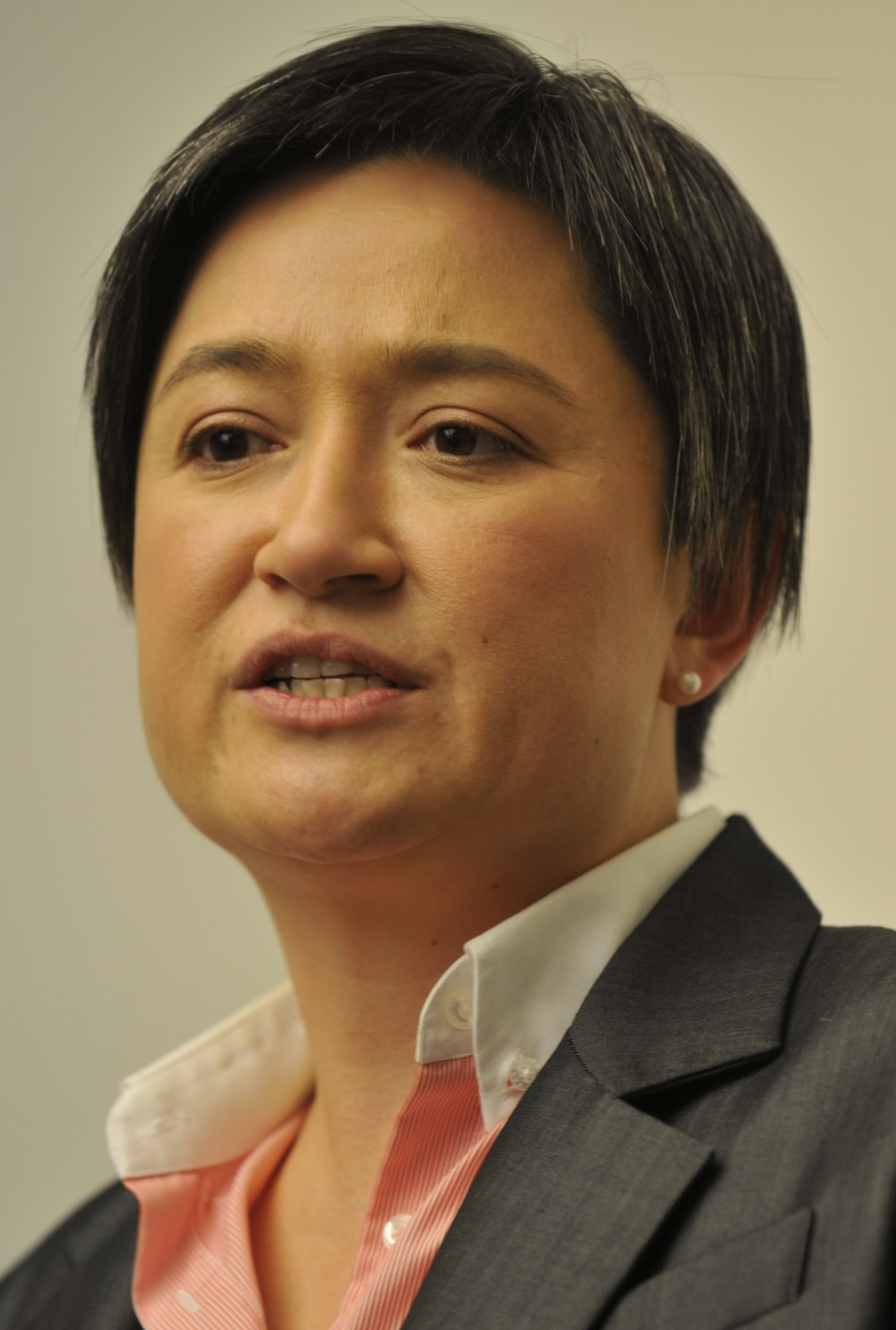

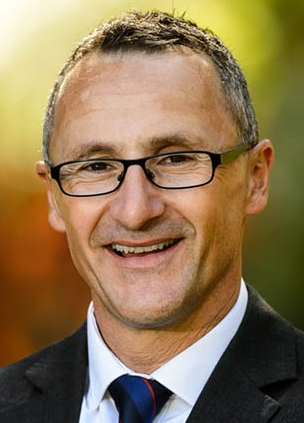

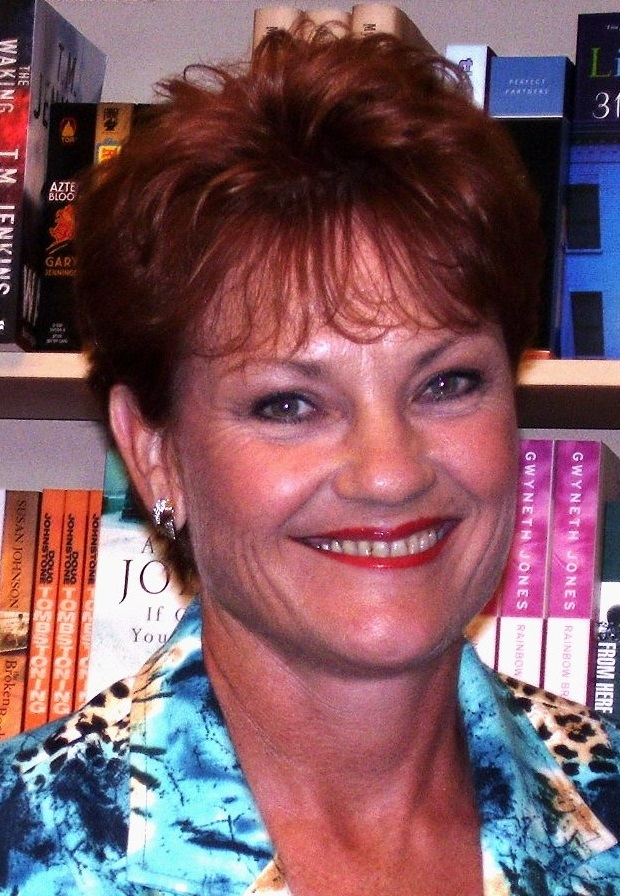

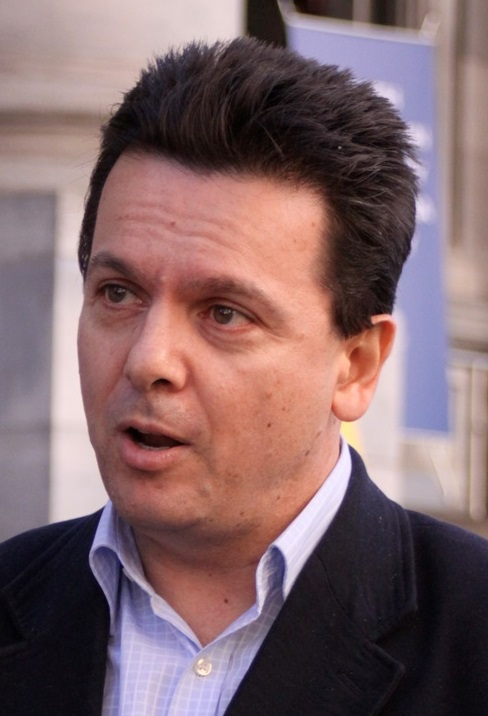

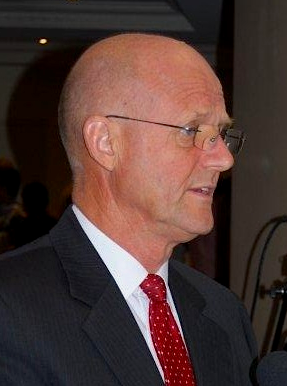

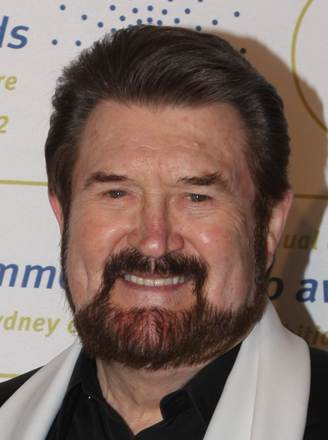

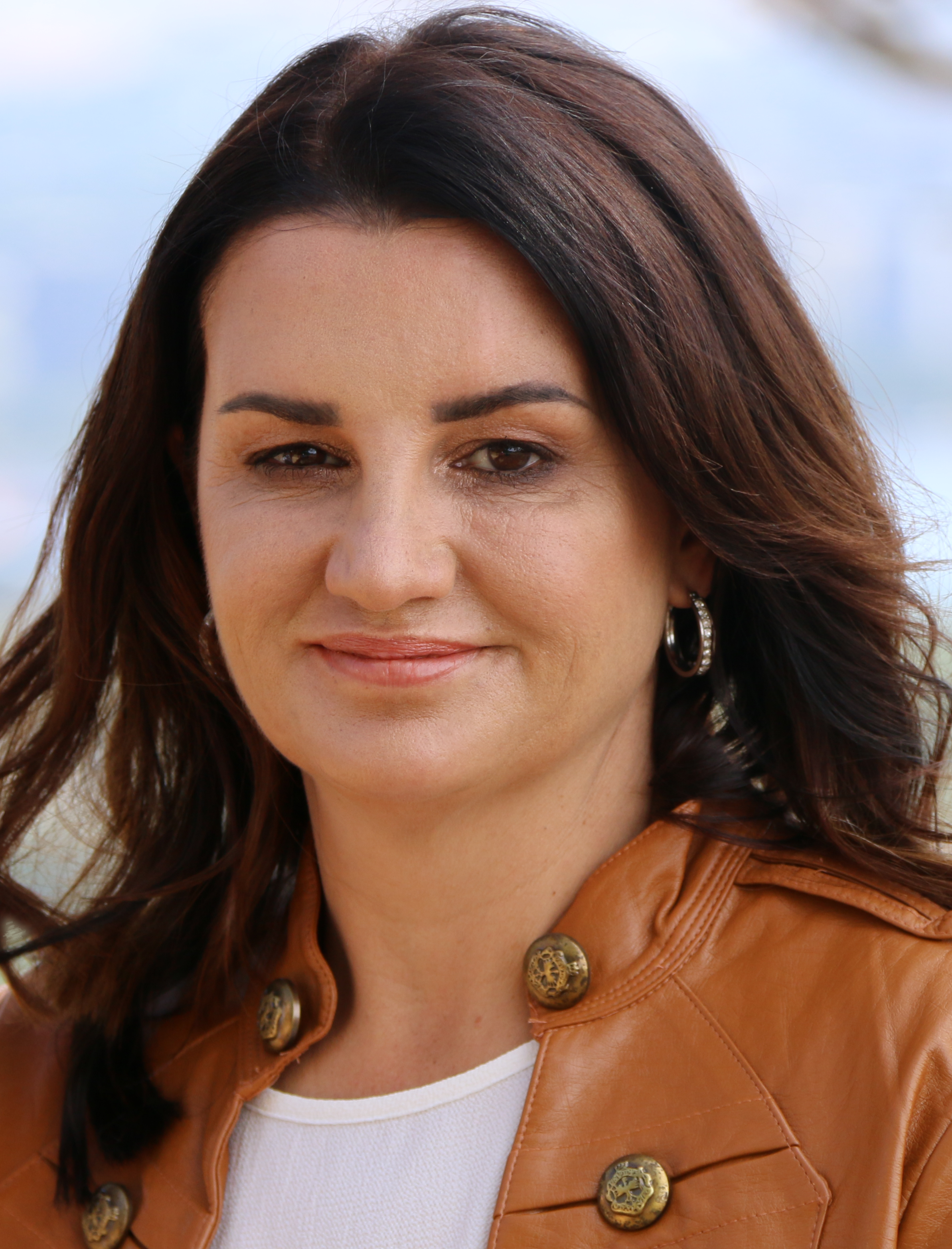
	First party	Second party	Third party
Leader	George Brandis (Note: Brandis was the Leader of the Government in the Senate, whereas the leader of the Coalition in the Australian House of Representatives was Prime Minister Malcolm Turnbull.)	Penny Wong (Note: Wong was the Leader of the Opposition in the Senate, whereas the leader of the Labor Party in the Australian House of Representatives was Opposition Leader Bill Shorten.)	Richard Di Natale
Party	Liberal/National Coalition	Labor	Greens
Leader since	20 September 2015	26 June 2013	6 May 2015
Leader's seat	Queensland	South Australia	Victoria
Seats before	33	25	10
Seats won	30	26	9
Seat change	▼3	▲1	▼1
Popular vote	4,868,246	4,123,084	1,197,657
Percentage	35.18%	29.79%	8.65%
Swing	▼2.52%	▲0.16%	▼0.58%
	Fourth party	Fifth party	Sixth party
Leader	Pauline Hanson	Nick Xenophon	David Leyonhjelm
Party	One Nation	Xenophon Team	Liberal Democrats
Leader's seat	Queensland (won seat)	South Australia (won seat)	New South Wales (won seat)
Seats before	0	1	1
Seats won	4	3	1
Seats after	4	3	1
Seat change	▲4	▲2	Steady
Popular vote	593,013	456,369	298,915
Percentage	4.29%	3.30%	2.16%
Swing	▲3.76%	▲1.37%	▼1.59%
	Seventh party	Eighth party	Ninth party
Leader	Derryn Hinch	Bob Day	Jacqui Lambie
Party	Justice	Family First	Lambie Network
Leader's seat	Victoria (won seat)	South Australia (won seat)	Tasmania (won seat)
Seats before	New	1	New
Seats won	1	1	1
Seats after	1	1	1
Seat change	▲1	Steady	▲1
Popular vote	266,607	191,112	69,074
Percentage	1.93%	1.38%	0.50%
Swing	▲1.93%	▲0.26%	▲0.50%
- Government (30) Coalition; Liberal (21) LNP (5) (Note: 3 LNP Senators sit in the Liberal party room and 2 in the National party room) National (3) CLP (1) (Note: Sits in National party room) Opposition (26); Labor (26) Crossbench (20); Greens (9) One Nation (4) Xenophon Team (3) Family First (1) Liberal Democrat (1) Lambie (1) Hinch (1)
Leader of the Senate before election
George Brandis
Liberal/National coalition
Elected Leader of the Senate
George Brandis
Liberal/National coalition

The 2016 Australian federal election in the Senate was part of a double dissolution election held on Saturday 2 July to elect all 226 members of the 45th Parliament of Australia, after an extended eight-week official campaign period. It was the first double dissolution election since the 1987 election and the first under a new voting system for the Senate that replaced group voting tickets with optional preferential voting.

The final outcome in the 76-seat Australian Senate took over four weeks to complete despite significant voting changes. Earlier in 2016, legislation changed the Senate voting system from a full-preference single transferable vote with group voting tickets to an optional-preferential single transferable vote. The final Senate result was announced on 4 August: Liberal/National Coalition 30 seats (−3), Labor 26 seats (+1), Greens 9 seats (−1), One Nation 4 seats (+4) and Nick Xenophon Team 3 seats (+2). Former broadcaster and founder of the Justice Party Derryn Hinch, won a seat, while Jacqui Lambie, Liberal Democrat David Leyonhjelm and Family First's Bob Day retained their seats. The number of crossbenchers increased by two to a record 20. The Liberal/National Coalition will require at least nine additional votes to reach a Senate majority, an increase of three.

A number of initially elected senators were declared ineligible a result of the 2017–18 Australian parliamentary eligibility crisis, and replaced after recounts.

== Terms of senators ==
The two major parties negotiated to allocate a six-year term to the first elected six of twelve senators in each state, while the last six received a three-year term. This was consistent with the Senate practice on all seven previous occasions. In 1983 the Joint Select Committee on Electoral Reform had unanimously recommended an alternative "recount" method to reflect proportional representation, and the Commonwealth Electoral Act provides for a recount on that basis. This recount method had been supported by both Labor and the Coalition in two separate, identical, bipartisan senate resolutions, passed in 1998 and 2010. By not using the recount method, Labor and the Coalition each gained one senate seat from 2019 to 2022.

== Australia ==
The final Senate result was announced on 4 August. The incumbent Liberal/National Coalition government won 30 seats, a net loss of three − the Coalition lost four Senators, one each from New South Wales, Queensland, Western Australia and South Australia, but gained a Senator in Victoria. The Labor opposition won 26 seats, a gain of one − a Senator in Western Australia. The number of crossbenchers increased by two to a record 20. The Liberal/National Coalition would require at least nine additional votes to reach a Senate majority, an increase of three.

Senate election results.

Senate (STV OPV) – Turnout 91.93% (CV) – Informal 3.94%
Party	Votes	%	Swing	Seats won	Change
Liberal–National Coalition	4,868,246	35.18	–1.32	30	▼3
Liberal/National joint ticket	2,769,426	20.01	−1.16	10	Steady
Liberal	1,066,579	7.71	+0.77	14	▼2
Liberal National	960,467	6.94	−1.16	5	▼1
Country Liberal	37,156	0.27	−0.05	1	Steady
National (WA)	34,618	0.25	−0.06	0	Steady
Labor	4,123,084	29.79	+0.16	26	▲1
Greens	1,197,657	8.65	−0.58	9	▼1
One Nation	593,013	4.29	+3.76	4	▲4
Xenophon Team	456,369	3.30	+1.37	3	▲2
Liberal Democrats	298,915	2.16	–1.59	1	Steady
Justice	266,607	1.93	+1.93	1	▲1
Shooters, Fishers and Farmers	192,923	1.39	+0.44		
Family First	191,112	1.38	+0.26	1	Steady
Christian Democrats	162,155	1.17	+0.63		
Animal Justice	159,373	1.15	+0.46		
Liberty Alliance	102,982	0.74	+0.74		
Democratic Labour	94,510	0.68	–0.18	0	▼1
Sex Party	94,262	0.68	–0.64		
Health Australia	85,233	0.62	+0.62		
Sex–HEMP Joint Ticket	76,744	0.55	+0.55		
Lambie Network	69,074	0.50	+0.50	1	▲1
Christians	66,525	0.48	+0.09		
Drug Law Reform	61,327	0.44	+0.38		
Motoring Enthusiasts	53,232	0.38	–0.12	0	▼1
Katter's Australian	53,123	0.38	–0.50		
Glenn Lazarus Team	45,149	0.33	+0.33		
Marriage Equality	44,982	0.33	+0.33		
Arts	37,702	0.27	+0.27		
Rise Up Australia	36,424	0.26	–0.10		
Pirate	35,184	0.25	–0.11		
Renewable Energy	29,983	0.22	+0.22		
Science–Cyclists Joint Ticket	29,934	0.22	+0.22		
HEMP	29,510	0.21	–0.50		
Sustainable Australia	26,341	0.19	+0.08		
Palmer United	26,210	0.19	–5.42	0	▼3
Cyclists	24,276	0.18	+0.18		
Voluntary Euthanasia	23,252	0.17	–0.06		
Seniors United	22,213	0.16	+0.16		
VOTEFLUX.ORG	20,453	0.15	+0.15		
Mature Australia	18,920	0.14	+0.14		
Online Direct Democracy	11,857	0.09	+0.06		
Secular	11,077	0.08	–0.01		
Defence Veterans	10,391	0.08	+0.08		
Socialist Alliance	9,968	0.07	+0.04		
Citizens Electoral Council	9,850	0.07	+0.06		
Country	9,316	0.07	+0.02 (Note: formally Country Alliance Party at the 2013 election)		
Socialist Equality	7,865	0.06	+0.02		
Progressives	6,251	0.05	+0.05		
CountryMinded	5,989	0.04	+0.04		
Manufacturing and Farming	5,268	0.04	+0.04		
Australia First	3,005	0.02	+0.02		
Recreational Fishers	2,376	0.02	+0.02		
Non-Custodial Parents	2,102	0.02	+0.01		
Science	1,306	0.01	+0.01		
Unendorsed/ungrouped	25,280	0.18	+0.00		
Total	13,838,900			76	
Invalid/blank votes	567,806	3.94	+1.01		
Registered voters/turnout	15,671,551	91.93	–1.52		
Source: Federal Election 2016

== New South Wales ==
2016 Australian federal election: Senate, New South Wales
Party	Candidate	Votes	%	±%
Quota		345,554		
Liberal/National Coalition	1. Marise Payne (elected 1); 2. Arthur Sinodinos (elected 3); 3. Fiona Nash (elected 5) (Note: Nash was declared to be ineligible by the Court of Disputed Returns because she was a dual citizen of the United Kingdom. A special recount resulted in Jim Molan being declared to have been elected.); 4. Concetta Fierravanti-Wells (elected 7); 5. John Williams (elected 10); 6. Hollie Hughes; 7. Jim Molan; 8. Wes Fang; 9. Sang Ok; 10. Sarah Richards; 11. Fiona Leviny; 12. Victoria McGahey	1,610,626	35.85	+1.65
Labor	1. Sam Dastyari (elected 2); 2. Jenny McAllister (elected 4); 3. Deborah O'Neill (elected 6); 4. Doug Cameron (elected 8); 5. Tara Moriarty; 6. Vivien Thomson; 7. Shuo Zhou; 8. Jagath Bandara; 9. Miriam Rizvi; 10. Mary O'Sullivan; 11. Paul Yi-Wen Han; 12. Alexandra Costello	1,405,088	31.28	−0.28
Greens	1. Lee Rhiannon (elected 9); 2. Michael Osborne; 3. Jane Oakley; 4. Jananie Janarthana; 5. Marika Kontellis; 6. Gareth Bryant; 7. Christina Ho; 8. Kathryn Maiden; 9. Ray Goodlass; 10. Christine Donayre; 11. Kate Parker; 12. Sarah Fernandes	332,860	7.41	−0.38
One Nation	1. Brian Burston (elected 11); 2. Dean Mackin; 3. Christine Bernier	184,012	4.10	+2.88
Liberal Democrats	1. David Leyonhjelm (elected 12); 2. Sam Kennard	139,007	3.09	−6.41
Christian Democrats	1. Nella Hall; 2. Peter Rahme; 3. Deborah Lions; 4. Andrew Phillips; 5. Tania Piper; 6. Beth Smith; 7. Dave Vincent; 8. Colin Broadbridge; 9. Rhonda Avasalu; 10. Archie Lea; 11. Lena El-Daghl; 12. Charles Knox	121,379	2.70	+1.04
Shooters, Fishers, Farmers	1. Karl Houseman; 2. Peter Johnson	88,837	1.98	+0.73
Xenophon	1. Aidan Dalgliesh; 2. Anthony Dona	80,111	1.78	+1.78
Health Australia	1. Andrew Patterson; 2. Leanne Paff	53,154	1.18	+1.18
Family First	1. Phil Jobe; 2. Sally Vincent; 3. Simon McCaffrey	53,027	1.18	+0.80
Democratic Labour	1. Paul McCormack; 2. Dawn Willis	51,510	1.15	−0.39
Animal Justice	1. Lynda Stoner; 2. Gordon Elkington	37,991	0.85	+0.37
Sex Party	1. Ross Fitzgerald; 2. Sue Raye	30,038	0.67	−0.35
Liberty Alliance	1. Kirralie Smith; 2. Gary Anderson	29,795	0.66	+0.66
HEMP	1. Jason Olbourne; 2. Andrew Katelaris	29,510	0.66	−0.03
Justice	1. Ken Stevens; 2. Adam Washbourne	26,720	0.59	+0.59
Seniors United	1. Gillian Evans; 2. Kerry Koliadis; 3. Chris Osborne	22,213	0.49	+0.49
Drug Law Reform	1. Ray Thorpe; 2. Stacey Dowson	20,883	0.46	+0.37
Science–Cyclists joint ticket	1. James Jansson; 2. Eve Slavich; 3. Ingrid Ralph; 4. Jai Cooper	18,367	0.41	+0.41
Lambie	1. Allan Thomas; 2. Bruce Relph; 3. Mitch Carr	16,502	0.37	+0.37
Motoring Enthusiasts	1. Rob Bryden; 2. Daniel Kirkness	16,356	0.36	−0.03
Voluntary Euthanasia	1. Shayne Higson; 2. Janise Farrell	15,198	0.34	+0.00
VOTEFLUX.ORG	1. Steven Lopez; 2. Nathan Spataro	12,578	0.28	+0.28
Arts	1. Barry Keldoulis; 2. Nicholas Gledhill	11,805	0.26	+0.26
Pirate	1. Sam Kearns; 2. Darren McIntosh	11,418	0.25	−0.08
Renewable Energy	1. Peter Breen; 2. Susan Perrow	8,936	0.20	+0.20
Sustainable Australia	1. William Bourke; 2. Greg Graham	7,723	0.17	+0.10
Rise Up Australia	1. Brian Tucker; 2. Maree Nichols	7,538	0.17	+0.07
Online Direct Democracy	1. Berge Der Sarkissian; 2. Arthur Emmett	6,353	0.14	+0.08
Defence Veterans	1. Raymond Bennie; 2. Mark Bradbury	5,857	0.13	+0.13
Socialist Alliance	1. Ken Canning; 2. Susan Price; 3. Sharlene Leroy-Dyer; 4. Howard Byrnes	5,382	0.12	+0.06
Katter's Australian	1. Tom Harris; 2. Anthony Belcastro	4,316	0.10	−0.34
Group G	1. Teresa van Lieshout; 2. Colin Bennett	3,871	0.09	+0.09
CountryMinded	1. Christopher Buckman; 2. Methuen Morgan	3,153	0.07	+0.07
Socialist Equality	1. James Cogan; 2. John Davis	2,933	0.07	+0.03
Palmer United	1. Suellen Wrightson; 2. Robert Marks; 3. Cara Donnelly	2,805	0.06	−3.33
Mature Australia	1. Paul Quinn; 2. Gregory Frearson	2,805	0.06	+0.10
Secular	1. Ian Bryce; 2. Dee Ellis	2,773	0.06	−0.01
Non-Custodial Parents	1. Eric Greening; 2. Andy Thompson	2,102	0.05	+0.02
Citizens Electoral Council	1. Ann Lawler; 2. Robert Butler	1,895	0.04	+0.04
Progressives	1. Allan Quartly; 2. Ash Rose	1,817	0.04	+0.04
Ungrouped	Warren Grzic; Jane Ward; Liam Munday; Bryan Lambert; Peter Wallace; James Wright; Joanna Rzetelski; Danny Lim; Maree Ann Cruze; Stephen Muller; Peter Muller; John Cooper; Santa Spruce-Peet-Boyd; David Ash; Nigel Smith; Ron Poulsen; Peter Gooley; Nick Chapman; Leonard Brown; Richelle Tsay	2,953	0.07	+0.07
Total formal votes		4,492,197	95.47	−1.21
Informal votes		213,073	4.53	+1.21
Turnout		4,705,270	92.49	−1.47

#	Senator	Party
1	Marise Payne	Liberal
2	Sam Dastyari	Labor
3	Arthur Sinodinos	Liberal
4	Jenny McAllister	Labor
5	Fiona Nash	Nationals
6	Deborah O'Neill	Labor
7	Concetta Fierravanti-Wells	Liberal
8	Doug Cameron	Labor
9	Lee Rhiannon	Greens
10	John Williams	Nationals
11	Brian Burston	One Nation
12	David Leyonhjelm	LDP

== Victoria ==
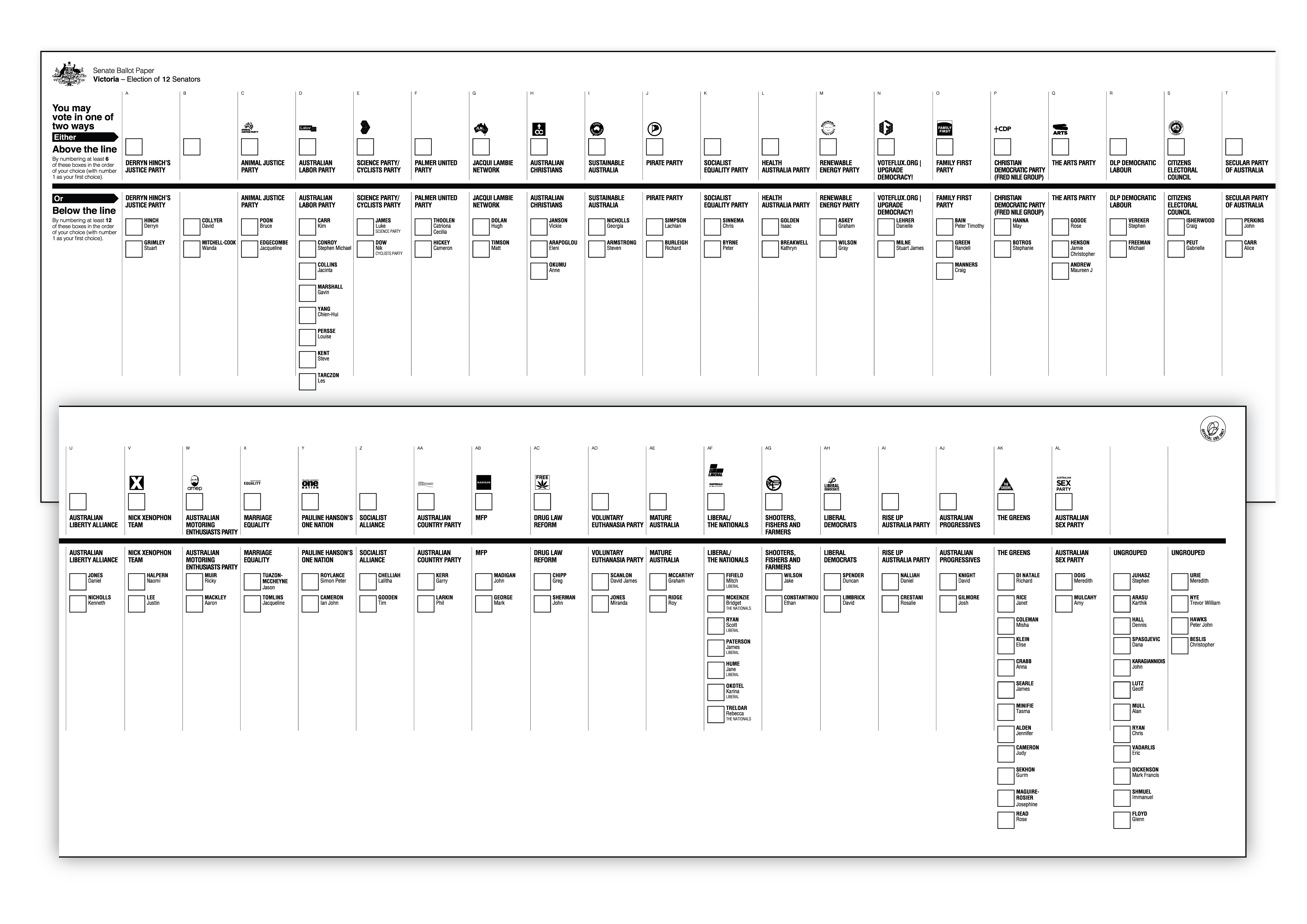
Senate ballot paper used in Victoria for 2016.

2016 Australian federal election: Senate, Victoria
Party	Candidate	Votes	%	±%
Quota		269,250		
Liberal/National Coalition	1. Mitch Fifield (elected 1); 2. Bridget McKenzie (elected 4); 3. Scott Ryan (elected 6); 4. James Paterson (elected 8); 5. Jane Hume (elected 12); 6. Karina Okotel; 7. Rebecca Treloar	1,158,800	33.11	−7.02
Labor	1. Kim Carr (elected 2); 1. Stephen Conroy (elected 5); 3. Jacinta Collins (elected 7); 4. Gavin Marshall (elected 9); 5. Jennifer Yang; 6. Louise Persse; 7. Steve Kent; 8. Les Tarczon	1,075,658	30.73	−1.72
Greens	1. Richard Di Natale (elected 3); 2. Janet Rice (elected 11); 3. Misha Coleman; 4. Elise Klein; 5. Anna Crabb; 6. James Searle; 7. Tasma Minifie; 8. Jennifer Alden; 9. Judy Cameron; 10. Gurm Sekhon; 11. Josephine Maguire-Rosier; 12. Rose Read	380,499	10.87	+0.03
Justice	1. Derryn Hinch (elected 10); 2. Stuart Grimley	211,733	6.05	+6.05
One Nation	1. Simon Roylance; 2. Ian Cameron	63,528	1.81	+1.80
Animal Justice	1. Bruce Poon; 2. Jacqueline Edgecombe	60,780	1.74	+0.99
Liberal Democrats	1. Duncan Spender; 2. David Limbrick	55,501	1.59	+1.58
Xenophon	1. Naomi Halpern; 2. Justin Lee	55,118	1.57	+1.57
Sex Party	1. Meredith Doig; 2. Amy Mulcahy	54,128	1.55	−0.34
Family First	1. Peter Bain; 2. Randell Green; 3. Craig Manners	39,747	1.14	−0.39
Shooters, Fishers, Farmers	1. Jake Wilson; 2. Ethan Constantinou	36,669	1.05	+0.22
Christians	1. Vickie Janson; 2. Eleni Arapoglou; 3. Anne Okumu	34,763	0.99	+0.50
Motoring Enthusiasts	1. Ricky Muir; 2. Aaron Mackley	31,785	0.91	+0.40
Drug Law Reform	1. Greg Chipp; 2. John Sherman	23,384	0.67	+0.55
Liberty Alliance	1. Daniel Jones; 2. Kenneth Nicholls	23,080	0.66	+0.66
Democratic Labour	1. Stephen Vereker; 2. Michael Freeman	18,152	0.52	−0.19
Health Australia	1. Isaac Golden; 2. Kathryn Breakwell	17,169	0.49	+0.49
Marriage Equality	1. Jason Tuazon-McCheyne; 2. Jacqueline Tomlins	17,139	0.49	+0.49
Lambie	1. Hugh Dolan; 2. Matt Timson	15,288	0.44	+0.44
Pirate	1. Lachlan Simpson; 2. Richard Burleigh	13,424	0.38	+0.01
Science–Cyclists joint ticket	1. Luke James; 2. Nik Dow	11,567	0.33	+0.33
Sustainable Australia	1. Georgia Nicholls; 2. Steven Armstrong	10,574	0.30	+0.18
Palmer United	1. Catriona Thoolen; 2. Cameron Hickey	10,456	0.30	−3.36
Rise Up Australia	1. Danny Nalliah; 2. Rosalie Crestani	10,166	0.29	−0.63
Country	1. Garry Kerr; 2. Phil Larkin	9,316	0.27	+0.27
Christian Democrats	1. May Hanna; 2. Stephanie Botros	9,287	0.27	+0.27
Renewable Energy	1. Graham Askey; 2. Gray Wilson	8,845	0.25	+0.25
Arts	1. Rose Godde; 2. Jamie Henson; 3. Maureen Andrew	7,737	0.22	+0.22
Voluntary Euthanasia	1. David Scanlon; 2. Miranda Jones	5,768	0.16	+0.16
MFP	1. John Madigan; 2. Mark George	5,268	0.15	+0.15
Mature Australia	1. Graham McCarthy; 2. Roy Ridge	3,469	0.10	+0.10
Group B	1. David Collyer; 2. Wanda Mitchell-Cook	3,386	0.10	+0.10
Socialist Equality	1. Chris Sinnema; 2. Peter Byrne	3,293	0.09	+0.02
VOTEFLUX.ORG	1. Danielle Lehrer; 2. Stuart Milne	2,838	0.08	+0.08
Socialist Alliance	1. Lalitha Chelliah; 2. Tim Gooden	2,597	0.07	+0.07
Secular	1. John Perkins; 2. Alice Carr	2,303	0.07	−0.06
Citizens Electoral Council	1. Craig Isherwood; 2. Gabrielle Peut	2,098	0.06	+0.02
Progressives	1. David Knight; 2. Josh Gilmore	2,064	0.06	+0.06
Ungrouped	Stephen Juhasz; Karthik Arasu; Dennis Hall; Dana Spasojevic; John Karagiannidis; Geoff Lutz; Allan Mull; Chris Ryan; Eric Vadarlis; Mark Dickenson; Immanuel Shmuel; Glenn Floyd; Meredith Urie; Trevor Nye; Peter Hawks; Christopher Beslis	2,860	0.08	−0.10
Total formal votes		3,500,237	95.80	−0.83
Informal votes		153,499	4.20	+0.83
Turnout		3,653,736	92.18	−1.87

#	Senator	Party
1	Mitch Fifield	Liberal
2	Kim Carr	Labor
3	Richard Di Natale	Greens
4	Bridget McKenzie	National
5	Stephen Conroy	Labor
6	Scott Ryan	Liberal
7	Jacinta Collins	Labor
8	James Paterson	Liberal
9	Gavin Marshall	Labor
10	Derryn Hinch	Justice
11	Janet Rice	Greens
12	Jane Hume	Liberal

== Queensland ==
2016 Australian federal election: Senate, Queensland
Party	Candidate	Votes	%	±%
Quota		209,475		
Liberal National	1. George Brandis (elected 1); 2. Matt Canavan (elected 4); 3. James McGrath (elected 6); 4. Ian Macdonald (elected 8); 5. Barry O'Sullivan (elected 10); 6. Joanna Lindgren; 7. Dan Ryan; 8. Gerard Rennick	960,467	35.27	−6.12
Labor	1. Murray Watt (elected 2); 2. Anthony Chisholm (elected 5); 3. Claire Moore (elected 7); 4. Chris Ketter (elected 11); 5. Jane Casey; 6. Cheryl Thompson	717,524	26.35	−2.17
One Nation	1. Pauline Hanson (elected 3); 2. Malcolm Roberts (elected 12) (Note: Roberts was declared to be ineligible by the Court of Disputed Returns because he was a dual citizen of the United Kingdom. A special recount determined that Fraser Anning was elected instead.); 3. Fraser Anning; 4. Judy Smith	250,126	9.19	+8.64
Greens	1. Larissa Waters (elected 9) (Note: Waters resigned on 18 July 2017 because she was a dual citizen of Canada. The Court of Disputed Returns declared she was ineligible to be elected. A special recount declared Andrew Bartlett had been elected instead.); 2. Andrew Bartlett; 3. Ben Pennings; 4. Johanna Kloot; 5. Fiona Anderson; 6. Charles Worringham; 7. Rainee Skinner; 8. Janina Leo; 9. Meg Anderson; 10. Louise Noble; 11. Kirsten Kennedy; 12. Elena Quirk	188,323	6.92	+0.88
Liberal Democrats	1. Gabe Buckley; 2. John Rooth	77,601	2.85	+2.16
Xenophon	1. Suzanne Grant; 2. Daniel Crow	55,653	2.04	+2.04
Family First	1. Rod McGarvie; 2. Sue Baynes; 3. Kate Horan; 4. David Pellowe	52,453	1.93	+0.84
Katter's Australian	1. Rowell Walton; 2. Joy Marriott	48,807	1.79	−1.15
Glenn Lazarus Team	1. Glenn Lazarus; 2. Kerrod Walters; 3. Annette Lourigan	45,149	1.66	+1.66
Animal Justice	1. Paul Bevan; 2. Zade Watson	32,306	1.19	+0.12
Sex Party–HEMP joint ticket	1. Robin Bristow; 2. Therese Howes; 3. Kirsty Patten	30,157	1.11	+1.11
Shooters, Fishers, Farmers	1. Michael Turner; 2. Michael Gee	29,571	1.09	+0.39
Liberty Alliance	1. Bernard Gaynor; 2. Alan Biggs; 3. Chelle Dobson	29,392	1.08	+1.08
Marriage Equality	1. Marnie Southward; 2. William Moran	23,811	0.87	+0.87
Cyclists	1. Chris Cox; 2. Edward Re	19,933	0.73	+0.73
Drug Law Reform	1. Deb Lynch; 2. Lorraine Smith	17,060	0.63	+0.63
Democratic Labour	1. Sheila Vincent; 2. Lucius Majoor	15,443	0.57	+0.25
Justice	1. Deb Cotter; 2. Karin Hanbidge	14,256	0.52	+0.52
Arts	1. Frances Jankowski; 2. Neil Fainges	11,030	0.41	+0.41
Pirate	1. Brandon Selic; 2. Isaac Pursehouse	10,342	0.38	−0.12
Health Australia	1. Jason Woodforth; 2. Sarinah Golden	10,147	0.37	+0.37
Christians	1. Shea Taylor; 2. Malcolm Brice	9,686	0.36	−0.06
Lambie	1. Marcus Saltmarsh; 2. Crystal Peckett	9,138	0.34	+0.34
Christian Democrats	1. Wayne Solomon; 2. Ludy Sweeris-Sigrist	7,314	0.27	+0.27
Renewable Energy	1. James Moylan; 2. MaryBeth Gundrum	6,245	0.23	+0.23
Rise Up Australia	1. Paul Taylor; 2. Neroli Mooney	5,734	0.21	+0.00
Mature Australia	1. Terry Snell; 2. Belinda Cameron	5,519	0.20	+0.20
Online Direct Democracy	1. Peter Radic; 2. David Missingham	5,504	0.20	+0.16
Sustainable Australia	1. John Roles; 2. Matt Moran	5,366	0.20	+0.20
Palmer United	1. James McDonald; 2. Craig Gunnis	4,816	0.18	−9.71
Secular	1. Trevor Bell; 2. Scott Clark	4,623	0.17	+0.07
Defence Veterans	1. Jeremy Davey; 2. Darryl Hodkinson	4,534	0.17	+0.17
CountryMinded	1. Pete Mailler; 2. Sherrill Stivano	2,836	0.10	+0.10
VOTEFLUX.ORG	1. Mark Gardner; 2. Reece Flowers	1,881	0.07	+0.07
Citizens Electoral Council	1. Jan Pukallus; 2. Stephen Harding	1,877	0.07	+0.07
Socialist Equality	1. Mike Head; 2. Erin Cooke	1,639	0.06	+0.00
Group R	1. Sal Rivas; 2. Val Tanguilig	1,536	0.06	+0.06
Progressives	1. Ken Stevens; 2. Jo McCormack	1,213	0.04	+0.04
Ungrouped	Shyamal Reddy; Greg McMahon; David Bundy; Kim Vuga; Jim Savage; Tony Moore; Josephine Potter; Paul Stevenson; Marshal Anderson; Ian Eugarde; Julie Boyd; Leeanne Hanna-McGuffie; Zoemaree Harris; Michael Kaff; Terry Jorgensen; Gary Pead; John Gibson; Belinda Marriage; Greg Beattie	4,154	0.15	−0.01
Total formal votes		2,723,166	96.60	−1.25
Informal votes		95,831	3.40	+1.25
Turnout		2,818,997	91.65	−2.52

#	Senator	Party
1	George Brandis	LNP
2	Murray Watt	Labor
3	Pauline Hanson	One Nation
4	Matt Canavan	LNP
5	Anthony Chisholm	Labor
6	James McGrath	LNP
7	Claire Moore	Labor
8	Ian Macdonald	LNP
9	Larissa Waters	Greens
10	Barry O'Sullivan	LNP
11	Chris Ketter	Labor
12	Malcolm Roberts	One Nation

== Western Australia ==
2016 Australian federal election: Senate, Western Australia
Party	Candidate	Votes	%	±%
Quota		105,091		
Liberal	1. Mathias Cormann (elected 1); 2. Michaelia Cash (elected 4); 3. Dean Smith (elected 6); 4. Linda Reynolds (elected 8); 5. Chris Back (elected 9); 6. David Johnston; 7. Sheridan Ingram	525,930	38.50	+4.44
Labor	1. Sue Lines (elected 2); 2. Glenn Sterle (elected 5); 3. Pat Dodson (elected 7); 4. Louise Pratt (elected 10); 5. Mark Reed; 6. Susan Bowers; 7. Mia Onorato	386,142	28.26	+6.73
Greens	1. Scott Ludlam (elected 3) (Note: Ludlam resigned on 14 July 2017 because he was a dual citizen of New Zealand. The Court of Disputed Returns declared he was ineligible to be elected. A special recount led to Steele-John being declared to have been elected instead.); 2. Rachel Siewert (elected 12); 3. Jordon Steele-John; 4. Samantha Jenkinson; 5. Michael Boldock; 6. Rai Ismail	143,814	10.53	−5.07
One Nation	1. Rod Culleton (elected 11) (Note: Culleton was found ineligible by the Court of Disputed Returns. A special recount led to Georgiou being declared to have been elected on 10 March 2017.); 2. Peter Georgiou; 3. Ioanna Culleton	54,492	3.99	+3.99
National	1. Kado Muir; 2. Nick Fardell; 3. Elizabeth Re	34,633	2.54	−0.50
Xenophon	1. Luke Bolton; 2. Michael Bovell	29,680	2.17	+2.17
Shooters, Fishers, Farmers	1. Andrew Skerritt; 2. Ross Williamson	25,375	1.86	+0.83
Sex Party–HEMP joint ticket	1. Michael Balderstone; 2. James Hurley	25,108	1.84	+1.84
Christians	1. Lindsay Cameron; 2. Jacky Young	22,089	1.62	+0.08
Liberty Alliance	1. Debbie Robinson; 2. Marion Hercock	15,208	1.11	+1.11
Christian Democrats	1. Mark Imisides; 2. Philip Read	13,771	1.01	+1.01
Animal Justice	1. Katrina Love; 2. Alicia Sutton	12,702	0.93	+0.28
Liberal Democrats	1. Graeme Klass; 2. Connor Whittle	10,775	0.79	−1.03
Justice	1. Nicki Hide; 2. Rachael Higgins	10,116	0.74	+0.74
Democratic Labour	1. Fernando Bove; 2. Troy Kiernan	9,420	0.69	+0.48
Family First	1. Linda Rose; 2. Henry Heng	8,746	0.64	−0.10
Palmer United	1. Dio Wang; 2. Jacque Kruger	5,008	0.37	−11.97
Health Australia	1. Samantha Tilbury; 2. Sara Fargher	4,786	0.35	+0.35
Renewable Energy	1. Pedro Schwindt; 2. Camilla Sundbladh	4,632	0.34	+034
Rise Up Australia	1. Anthony Hardwick; 2. Sheila Mundy	3,743	0.27	+0.10
Arts	1. Robert Buratti; 2. Robert Taylor	3,037	0.22	+0.22
Australia First	1. Lyn Vickery; 2. Brian McRea	3,027	0.22	+0.22
Mature Australia	1. Stuart Donald; 2. Patti Bradshaw	2,697	0.20	+0.20
Cyclists	1. Peter Mah; 2. Christopher Howard	2,682	0.20	+0.20
Citizens Electoral Council	1. Jean Robinson; 2. Judy Sudholz	2,049	0.15	+0.15
Socialist Alliance	1. Kamala Emanuel; 2. Seamus Doherty; 3. Farida Iqbal	1,990	0.15	+0.09
VOTEFLUX.ORG	1. Richard Thomas; 2. Mark Connolly	1,392	0.10	+0.10
Ungrouped	Kai Jones; Tammara Moody; Julie Matheson; Peter Castieau; Susan Hoddinott; Norm Ramsay	3,148	0.23	−0.40
Total formal votes		1,366,182	96.65	−0.85
Informal votes		47,371	3.35	+0.85
Turnout		1,413,553	89.55	+1.05

#	Senator	Party
1	Mathias Cormann	Liberal
2	Sue Lines	Labor
3	Scott Ludlam	Greens
4	Michaelia Cash	Liberal
5	Glenn Sterle	Labor
6	Dean Smith	Liberal
7	Pat Dodson	Labor
8	Linda Reynolds	Liberal
9	Chris Back	Liberal
10	Louise Pratt	Labor
11	Rod Culleton	One Nation
12	Rachel Siewert	Greens

== South Australia ==
2016 Australian federal election: Senate, South Australia
Party	Candidate	Votes	%	±%
Quota		81,629		
Liberal	1. Simon Birmingham (elected 1); 2. Cory Bernardi (elected 4); 3. Anne Ruston (elected 7); 4. David Fawcett (elected 9); 5. Sean Edwards; 6. Kerrynne Liddle	346,423	32.65	+5.20
Labor	1. Penny Wong (elected 2); 2. Don Farrell (elected 5); 3. Alex Gallacher (elected 8); 4. Anne McEwen; 5. Michael Allison; 6. Bronwyn Gallacher	289,942	27.32	+4.66
Xenophon	1. Nick Xenophon (elected 3); 2. Stirling Griff (elected 6); 3. Skye Kakoschke-Moore (elected 10) (Note: Kakoschke-Moore resigned on 22 November 2017 after learning she was a British citizen by descent. The Court of Disputed Returns declared she had been ineligible to be elected on 13 February 2018. A special recount determined that Tim Storer was elected instead.); 4. Tim Storer	230,866	21.76	−3.12
Greens	1. Sarah Hanson-Young (elected 11); 2. Robert Simms; 3. Jody Moate; 4. Harriet de Kok	62,345	5.88	−1.21
One Nation	1. Steven Burgess; 2. Angelina Nicolis	31,681	2.99	+2.70
Family First	1. Bob Day (elected 12) (Note: Day was found ineligible by the Court of Disputed Returns. A special recount led to Gichuhi being declared to have been elected on 19 April 2017.); 2. Lucy Gichuhi	29,187	2.75	−1.01
Sex Party–HEMP joint ticket	1. Ryan Parker; 2. Margaret Saunders	12,102	1.14	+1.14
Animal Justice	1. Tania Noble; 2. Emma Breagan	9,000	0.85	+0.23
Shooters, Fishers, Farmers	1. John Hahn; 2. Nick Carter	7,825	0.74	+0.15
Liberal Democrats	1. Roostam Sadri; 2. Michael Noack	6,924	0.65	−2.88
Motoring Enthusiasts	1. Nathan Green; 2. Judith Kuerschner	5,101	0.48	−0.18
Mature Australia	1. Darryl Bothe; 2. Lyndal Denny	4,448	0.42	+0.42
Liberty Alliance	1. Wanda Lee Marsh; 2. Andrew Horwood	4,441	0.42	+0.42
Marriage Equality	1. Adrian Tuazon-McCheyne; 2. Alex Bond	4,056	0.38	+0.38
Arts	1. Terence Crawford; 2. Charles Sanders	3,371	0.32	+0.32
Christian Democrats	1. Matt Attia; 2. Joseph Stephen	3,011	0.26	+0.26
Justice	1. Lynn-Marie Grosser; 2. Colin Thomas	2,362	0.22	+0.22
Voluntary Euthanasia	1. Jessica Knight; 2. Kym Buckley	2,289	0.22	−0.09
Cyclists	1. Sundance Bilson-Thompson; 2. Angus Harker-Smith	1,668	0.16	+0.16
Progressives	1. Sasha Pazeski-Nikoloski; 2. Jaz Priddey	1,161	0.11	+0.11
VOTEFLUX.ORG	1. Adam Bird; 2. Jeff Baker	826	0.08	+0.08
Palmer United	1. Kristian Rees; 2. Carlo Filingeri	782	0.07	−2.58
Citizens Electoral Council	1. Alex Kozlow; 2. Paul Siebert	500	0.05	+0.05
Ungrouped	Ron Waters; Christopher Cochrane; Adam Richards; Mohammad Ali; Dave Saddler; Malcolm Davey	854	0.08	−0.14
Total formal votes		1,061,165	96.67	−0.68
Informal votes		36,545	3.33	+0.68
Turnout		1,097,710	92.79	−1.56

#	Senator	Party
1	Simon Birmingham	Liberal
2	Penny Wong	Labor
3	Nick Xenophon	NXT
4	Cory Bernardi	Liberal
5	Don Farrell	Labor
6	Stirling Griff	NXT
7	Anne Ruston	Liberal
8	Alex Gallacher	Labor
9	David Fawcett	Liberal
10	Skye Kakoschke-Moore	NXT
11	Sarah Hanson-Young	Greens
12	Bob Day	FFP

== Tasmania ==
2016 Australian federal election: Senate, Tasmania
Party	Candidate	Votes	%	±%
Quota		26,090		
Labor	1. Anne Urquhart (elected 2); 2. Helen Polley (elected 6); 3. Carol Brown (elected 8); 4. Catryna Bilyk (elected 11); 5. John Short; 6. Lisa Singh (elected 10) (Note: In 2016, Lisa Singh was demoted to sixth position on the Labor Party's Tasmanian Senate ticket behind Senator Catryna Bilyk and union secretary John Short. A quota in Tasmania was 26,090 votes with Singh receiving 20,741 below-the-line votes: enough to overturn the party’s ticket order. She was the 10th senator elected for Tasmania, ahead of Catryna Bilyk (elected 11th), with John Short missing out.)	113,935	33.59	+0.76
Liberal	1. Eric Abetz (elected 1); 2. Stephen Parry (elected 5) (Note: Parry resigned on 1 November 2017 because he was a dual citizen of the United Kingdom. A special recount determined that Colbeck was elected instead.); 3. Jonathon Duniam (elected 7); 4. David Bushby (elected 9); 5. Richard Colbeck; 6. John Tucker	110,318	32.53	−4.98
Greens	1. Peter Whish-Wilson (elected 3); 2. Nick McKim (elected 12); 3. Anna Reynolds	37,840	11.16	−0.50
Lambie	1. Jacqui Lambie (elected 4) (Note: Lambie resigned on 14 November 2017 because she was a dual citizen of the United Kingdom. The Court of Disputed Returns declared she had been ineligible to be elected on 9 February 2018. A special recount determined that Martin was elected instead.); 2. Steve Martin; 3. Rob Waterman	28,146	8.30	+8.30
One Nation	1. Kate McCulloch; 2. Natasia Manzi	8,700	2.57	+2.57
Family First	1. Peter Madden; 2. Andrew Goelst; 3. Nick Cramp; 4. Mihi Ngawhare	6,692	1.97	+0.66
Xenophon	1. Michelle Hoult; 2. Nicky Cohen	5,128	1.51	+1.51
Shooters, Fishers, Farmers	1. Matthew Allen; 2. Ricky Midson	4,688	1.38	+0.28
Sex Party–HEMP joint ticket	1. Francesca Collins; 2. Matt Owen	4,493	1.32	+1.32
Christian Democrats	1. Silvana Nero-Nile; 2. Mishka Gora	2,861	0.84	+0.84
Animal Justice	1. Karen Bevis; 2. Alison Baker	2,377	0.70	+0.70
Recreational Fishers	1. Kevin Harkins; 2. Carmen Evans	2,376	0.70	+0.70
Palmer United	1. Kevin Morgan; 2. Justin Stringer; 3. Quentin Von Stieglitz	2,363	0.70	−5.88
Liberal Democrats	1. Clinton Mead; 2. Ian Alston	1,662	0.49	−1.83
Justice	1. Suzanne Cass; 2. Daniel Baker	1,473	0.43	+0.43
Renewable Energy	1. Rob Manson; 2. Sharon Joyce	1,340	0.40	+0.40
Science	1. Hans Willink; 2. Jin-oh Choi	1,306	0.39	+0.39
Liberty Alliance	1. Tony Robinson; 2. Susan Horwood	1,112	0.33	+0.33
VOTEFLUX.ORG	1. Adam Poulton; 2. Max Kaye	946	0.28	+0.28
Arts	1. Scott O'Hara; 2. JoAnne Volta	728	0.21	+0.21
Citizens Electoral Council	1. Meg Thornton; 2. Steve Kucina	177	0.05	+0.05
Ungrouped	David Crawford; Kaye Marskell; Richard Temby; Grant Russell; George Lane	498	0.15	+0.05
Total formal votes		339,159	96.52	−1.02
Informal votes		12,221	3.48	+1.02
Turnout		351,380	94.06	−1.02

#	Senator	Party
1	Eric Abetz	Liberal
2	Anne Urquhart	Labor
3	Peter Whish-Wilson	Greens
4	Jacqui Lambie	Lambie
5	Stephen Parry	Liberal
6	Helen Polley	Labor
7	Jonathon Duniam	Liberal
8	Carol Brown	Labor
9	David Bushby	Liberal
10	Lisa Singh	Labor
11	Catryna Bilyk	Labor
12	Nick McKim	Greens

== Territories ==
=== Australian Capital Territory ===
2016 Australian federal election: Senate, Australian Capital Territory
Party	Candidate	Votes	%	±%
Quota		84,923		
Labor	1. Katy Gallagher (elected 1); 2. David Smith	96,667	37.94	+3.50
Liberal	1. Zed Seselja (elected 2); 2. Jane Hiatt	84,615	33.21	+0.13
Greens	1. Christina Hobbs; 2. Sue Wareham	41,006	16.10	−3.17
Sex Party	1. Steven Bailey; 2. Robbie Swan	10,096	3.96	+0.47
Liberal Democrats	1. Matt Donnelly; 2. Cawley Hennings	7,460	2.93	+2.93
Animal Justice	1. Deborah Field; 2. Jessica Montagne	4,251	1.67	+0.46
Christian Democrats	1. David Kim; 2. Elizabeth Tadros	3,087	1.21	+1.21
Sustainable Australia	1. John Haydon; 2. Martin Tye	2,678	1.05	+0.67
Rise Up Australia	1. Sandie O'Connor; 2. Jess Wyatt	2,523	0.99	+0.43
Secular	1. David Edwards; 2. Denis Mihaljevic	1,378	0.54	+0.54
Ungrouped	Michael Hay; Anthony Hanson	1,006	0.39	+0.18
Total formal votes		254,767	97.79	−0.23
Informal votes		5,754	2.21	+0.23
Turnout		260,521	92.34	−2.53

#	Senator	Party
1	Katy Gallagher	Labor
2	Zed Seselja	Liberal

=== Northern Territory ===
2016 Australian federal election: Senate, Northern Territory
Party	Candidate	Votes	%	±%
Quota		34,010		
Labor	1. Malarndirri McCarthy (elected 1); 2. Pat Honan	38,197	37.44	+4.69
Country Liberal	1. Nigel Scullion (elected 2); 2. Jenni Lillis	37,156	36.42	−4.92
Greens	1. Michael Connard; 2. Kathy Bannister	11,003	10.78	+2.11
Rise Up Australia	1. Jan Pile; 2. Jimmy Gimini	6,768	6.63	+5.69
Sex Party–HEMP joint ticket	1. Andrew Kavasilas; 2. Timothy Jones	4,956	4.86	+4.86
Christian Democrats	1. Carol Ordish; 2. John Ordish	1,660	1.63	+1.63
Citizens Electoral Council	1. Trudy Campbell; 2. Ian Barry	1,255	1.23	+0.93
Ungrouped	TS Lee; Tristan Marshall; Maurie Japarta Ryan; Marney MacDonald; Greg Strettles	1,032	1.01	+1.01
Total formal votes		102,027	96.67	−0.66
Informal votes		3,512	3.33	+0.66
Turnout		105,539	79.34	−3.03

#	Senator	Party
1	Malarndirri McCarthy	Labor
2	Nigel Scullion	CLP
