= Brian Deegan (disambiguation) =

Brian Deegan (born 1974) is a motocross rider and off-road racer.

Brian Deegan may also refer to:

- Brian Deegan (lawyer) (born 1955), Australian political activist and former magistrate
- Brian Deegan, fictional character in In God's Hands (film)
