= Bob Day =

Australian politician and businessman (born 1952)

Bob Day AO

Senator for South Australia
- In office 1 July 2014 – 1 November 2016
- Preceded by: Don Farrell
- Succeeded by: Lucy Gichuhi

Chairman of the Family First Party
- In office November 2008 – November 2016
- Preceded by: Peter Harris
- Succeeded by: Party dissolved

Personal details
- Born: Robert John Day; 5 July 1952 (age 74) Manchester, England, United Kingdom
- Party: Australian Family Party (2020–present); Trumpet of Patriots (2025); Family First (2008–2017); Liberal (1987–2008)
- Spouse: Bronte Day (m. 1981)
- Children: 3
- Education: Gilles Plains High School
- Alma mater: South Australian Institute of Technology
- Occupation: Housing developer; Politician
- Website: www.bobday.com.au

Robert John Day (born 5 July 1952) is an Australian former politician and businessman who was a Senator for South Australia from 1 July 2014 to 1 November 2016. He is a former federal chairman of the Family First Party. Before entering politics, he worked in the housing industry, owning several businesses, and at one stage serving as president of the Housing Industry Association.

Day was the Liberal Party's candidate for the federal seat of Makin at the 2007 election, but resigned from the party after failing to gain preselection for the 2008 Mayo by-election. He subsequently joined the Family First Party and was their candidate for the by-election, later becoming their lead Senate candidate in South Australia at the 2010 election and 2013 election.

On his fourth attempt to enter federal parliament in 2013, Day was elected to the Senate from a 3.8 per cent primary vote for Family First, to a term beginning on 1 July 2014. Despite a decline in the party's vote to 2.9 per cent, he was re-elected at the 2016 double dissolution election. Elected to the 12th and final South Australian Senate spot, Day's term was due to expire on 30 June 2019.

Following the liquidation of Home Australia Group, Day announced his intention to resign from the Senate. However, he stated that a potential new investor had expressed interest in the business, that there was too much important work for the Family First Senate seat to be vacant for even one day and that therefore he would not resign before the year's end. However, Day resigned on 1 November 2016 after stating that the investor had backed out.

On 5 April 2017 the High Court held that Day's re-election to the Senate in July 2016 was invalid, since he'd had an "indirect pecuniary interest" in an agreement with the Commonwealth since at least February 2016. As a result, he had not been eligible to sit as a senator from at least February 2016 onward by reason of section 44(v) of the Constitution.

== Early life ==
Day was born in Manchester, UK, on 5 July 1952. He came to Australia as a child in 1963, settling in the inner-northern Adelaide suburb Gilles Plains, where his family lived in a housing trust. Day attended Gilles Plains High School and the University of South Australia.

== Career ==
Day's career started in the South Australian public service at the Materials and Research Laboratories of the former Highways Department, now part of the Department of Planning, Transport and Infrastructure. He qualified as a science technician after studying at the SA Institute of Technology (now UniSA). After six years he resigned and started in the building industry.

He was a founder of Homestead Homes and Home Australia, which now also owns Collier Homes in Western Australia, Newstart Homes in Queensland, Ashford Homes in Victoria and Huxley Homes in New South Wales. These are all major constructors of new houses in their respective states. He is the founder of Oz Homes Foundation, and is managing director of Home Australia. Day's business activities have made him a millionaire. Both Huxley Homes and Day himself have been fined for not complying with rectification orders. Huxley Homes has built many thousands of homes in NSW however twenty-five customers claimed they were in dispute with Huxley Homes and were taking legal action against the company for substandard or unfinished work. Huxley Homes denied the allegations saying they would vigorously defend any legal action. Day is the sole director of Ashford Homes, which is also facing action over unpaid money to creditors. In September 2016, The Australian newspaper raised concerns of how Day contributed $380,000 to Family First in 2012–13 while his businesses appeared to be facing financial difficulties.

He is a past president of the Housing Industry Association, the trade association which represents the residential housing industry in Australia.

Day was the long-time secretary of the New Right-influenced H.R. Nicholls Society and a founder of Independent Contractors of Australia (ICA) – a front group campaigning for labour market deregulation in Australia. According to John Stone of the H. R. Nicholls Society, "one of the most active members of that Association (ICA), Mr Bob Day, has been a member of the [H.R. Nicholls] Society's Board of Management almost from the outset. I do not think he will contradict me if I say that he has taken the ethos of the Society into the work of the Association."

Day was appointed an Officer of the Order of Australia for service to the housing industry and to social welfare, on Australia Day 2003. Day is a board member of the North East Development Agency, having been president for almost a decade, and of North East Vocational College in Adelaide.

In his community service role, Day has planted several thousand trees for farmers and land owners across South Australia. He undertook a roadside planting, irrigation and re-vegetation program along North East Road including a local school.

Day was elected federal chairman of the Family First Party in 2008.

On the day of Senator Cory Bernardi's resignation from the Liberal Party to form a new party, Day confirmed that he was collaborating with Bernardi but would not say whether he would join the new party; Family First stated that Day had resigned from its executive and believed that he had left the party.

Day formally filed bankruptcy papers and was declared bankrupt in April 2017. He was discharged from bankruptcy on 3 July 2020.

== Election candidacies ==
=== 2007 federal election ===
Upon the resignation of incumbent Trish Draper, Day was preselected as the candidate in the Division of Makin for the Liberal Party of Australia at the 2007 federal election, one of the three marginal seats in South Australia lost to the Australian Labor Party. On a record two-party vote of 57.7 percent to Labor from a record two-party swing of 8.6 percent in Makin at the time, the seat became the safest of the 23 Labor won from the coalition at the election.

=== 2008 Mayo by-election ===
Day decided to run as a Family First Party candidate at the 2008 Mayo by-election but was unsuccessful. He had joined Family First immediately prior to the by-election, after resigning his 20-year membership of the Liberal Party, accusing the party of a "manipulated" process which saw former Howard government advisor chiefly for WorkChoices, Jamie Briggs, gain Liberal preselection at the expense of others including Day. Although endorsed by former deputy Liberal Leader and former Treasurer Peter Costello, the Liberal preselection process saw Day obtain just 10 of 271 votes. Labor did not contest the safe Liberal seat, and on a two-party vote of 57 percent at the previous election, the Liberals retained the seat in the by-election with 53 percent of the two-candidate vote against the Australian Greens on 47 percent. Family First and Day received 11.4 percent of the primary vote, picking up a swing of 7.4 percent, coming fourth out of eleven candidates, behind the Liberals on 41.3 percent, the Greens on 21.4 percent and independent Diane Bell on 16.3 percent.

=== 2010 federal election ===
Day was first on the South Australian Family First Party ticket for the Australian Senate at the 2010 federal election but was unsuccessful. Previously, the 2007 result (where independent Nick Xenophon polled 15 percent) saw the Family First Party in South Australia suffer a 1.09 percent swing, finishing with a statewide primary vote of 2.89 percent. After preferences, a candidate needs 14.3 percent of the vote (a quota) to gain election. Some commentators claimed Day had a "strong chance of taking one of the last two South Australian Senate seats", citing "effective preferences from nine smaller parties". Other commentators rated Day a "slim" chance, citing campaign and financial troubles with the Family First Party. The 2010 result saw Day and Family First receive a swing of 1.19 percent to finish on 4.08 percent of the vote, compared with the party's lower house vote of 4.96 percent, receiving a swing of 0.91 percent. This was well short of a quota, with Liberal Party former MP David Fawcett projected by the Australian Broadcasting Corporation (ABC) to win the last of the six South Australian Senate seats up for election. Progression of the count temporarily gave Day a 512-vote lead, with Day being listed by the ABC as the provisional sixth South Australian Senator. However further progression of the count put Fawcett back in the lead by several thousand votes and went on to win the sixth and final South Australian Senate seat.

In the 2009/10 financial year Day made two loans totalling $405,000 to the Family First Party.

=== 2013 federal election ===
Day ran as a Family First Party South Australia Senate candidate at the 2013 federal election and was successful, taking the fifth available South Australian seat. The South Australian Senate Family First vote was 3.8 percent (down 0.3 percent), getting to the 14.3 percent quota from 19 group voting ticket party preferences: Australian Independents Party, Australian Stable Population Party, Liberal Democratic Party, Smokers' Rights Party, No Carbon Tax Climate Sceptics, Building Australia Party, Rise Up Australia Party, Katter's Australian Party, One Nation, Australian Fishing and Lifestyle Party, Australian Christians, Shooters and Fishers, Australian Motoring Enthusiast Party, Democratic Labour Party, Animal Justice Party, Australian Greens, Palmer United Party, HEMP Party, Australian Labor Party. The nationwide Family First Senate vote was 1.1 percent (down 1.0 percent). Day assumed his seat on 1 July 2014.

==== Glenn Druery and the Minor Party Alliance ====
Glenn Druery's Minor Party Alliance was behind the 2013 federal election preference deal successes with candidate elections on 0.2 percent (Sports Party), 0.5 percent (Motoring Enthusiasts Party) and 3.8 percent (Family First Party). Druery was on the payroll of the Shooters and Fishers Party and assisted in organising preference meetings and negotiating preference flows between parties. Druery had also received regular payments from the Family First Party and the Fishing and Lifestyle Party.

=== 2016 federal election ===
As Family First's sole incumbent, Day was successful at the 2016 federal election, despite having unsuccessfully mounted a High Court challenge against newly implemented Senate voting reforms which included the removal of group voting tickets, a feature which was crucial to the election of Day at the previous election. Though the South Australian Senate Family First vote was reduced to just 2.9 percent (down 0.9 percent), as the election was a double dissolution, the quota to be elected was halved. Day got to the 7.7 percent quota largely from Liberal preferences when the Liberal's 5th candidate Sean Edwards was eliminated from the count, largely due to the fact the Liberal how-to-vote card recommended to direct their first preference to Family First. Electing only six senators per state at a non-double dissolution election, the 12th and last spot in South Australia at this election came down to a race between Day and Labor's 4th candidate Anne McEwen. McEwen solidly led Day for the overwhelming majority of the count, until count 445 of a total 457. However upon Edwards and then One Nation candidate Steven Burgess being eliminated at count 445 and 455 respectively, leaving only McEwen and Day remaining, Day had collected enough preferences to overtake and narrowly defeat McEwen − by a couple of thousand preference votes. The nationwide Family First Senate vote was 1.4 percent (up 0.3 percent). Elected to the 12th and final South Australian Senate spot, Day was elected to a three-year term which was due to expire on 30 June 2019.

== Business collapse ==
=== Liquidation of Home Australia Group ===
On 17 October 2016, administrators McGrathNicol were called in to liquidate the Home Australia Group, a building company founded and managed by Day. The group operated under different names in five states: Homestead Homes in South Australia, Collier Homes in Western Australia, Newstart Homes in Queensland, Ashford Homes in Victoria, and Huxley Homes in New South Wales. At the time of the liquidation, construction was halted on over 200 houses being built by the company. All homes were covered by Home Owners Warranty insurance.

Day released a statement on the same day, stating that he had stepped away from the company when elected in 2013, but had returned in 2015 because of what he called "poor management decisions" in his absence. Seeking to sell the business, or find an equity partner to recapitalise, a contract was signed with a Philippines-based capital resource company to purchase a 75 per cent stake in the group, however the money was not transferred and Day claimed the transfer documents were fraudulent. He also announced his intention to resign from the Senate. In an interview with the ABC, Day said that under the circumstances, it would be "untenable to stay in parliament".

However, Day did not immediately resign on the day of the announcement. This gave Family First time to identify a replacement senator, and meant that Day could vote on contentious legislation such as the Australian Building and Construction Commission bill that had been one of the triggers for the double dissolution in 2016. Day later stated that he would not leave the Senate before the end of 2016, as there would not be time to install a replacement senator.

However, on 1 November 2016, Day announced he had tendered his immediate resignation to the President of the Australian Senate. In a statement, Day said "while a number of offers for various parts of the Home Australia business have been received, the major investor who has been examining the group's portfolio of assets over the past fortnight, has decided not to proceed. Accordingly, I have today tendered my resignation to the president of the Senate effective immediately. It has been an honour and a privilege to serve as a senator for South Australia and I am sorry it has ended this way."

=== Constitutional validity of election ===
Shortly after Day's resignation, the government announced that it would move in the Senate to refer the validity of Day's election in July 2016 to the High Court. The government believed Day had potentially violated section 44(v) of the Constitution, which provides that a person who "has any direct or indirect pecuniary interest in any agreement with the Public Service of the Commonwealth" is "incapable of being chosen or of serving" in either house of Parliament. The complaint centred around Day's Commonwealth-funded electorate office, which was located in a building formerly owned by Day and leased to the Commonwealth. In 2013, Day sold the building to a trust of which his family's business trust was a beneficiary. The rental payments from the Commonwealth were to be paid into an account controlled by Day.

The High Court, sitting as the Court of Disputed Returns, convened a preliminary hearing before Gordon J, whose judgment delivered on 27 January 2017 made numerous findings of fact. The case was heard on 7 February by a full court of the High Court, which delivered its judgment on 5 April.

The Court found that, since at least 26 February 2016–the day that the building's owner first directed that the rental payments go to Day's bank account–Day had had an "indirect pecuniary interest" in an agreement with the Commonwealth, and thus was in violation of section 44(v). At least three judges were prepared to say that the violation dated to 1 December 2015, when the Commonwealth initially entered into a lease agreement with the building's owner. This was despite the fact that Commonwealth public servants advised Finance Minister Mathias Cormann that it was open to him and that it would not be a conflict to make rental payments under the lease from 1 March forward (Hansard 7 November 2016). "The issue", he said, "was not a concern to the department at that point in time”. The High Court, however, found otherwise. It held that Day was ineligible to serve in the Senate as of 26 February 2016, and he was therefore ineligible to nominate for the federal election of 2 July 2016. The Court declared Day's seat vacant and ordered that a special recount of South Australian ballot papers be held in order to determine his replacement. Both Day and the Attorney-General envisaged that Day's replacement would be the other person on the Family First list in that election, Lucy Gichuhi, and the Court agreed. The Australian Labor Party lodged a challenge, claiming that Gichuhi might still be a citizen of Kenya, hence ineligible under Constitution section 44(i) as a citizen of a "foreign power". On 19 April 2017 a full court of the High Court found that the objection had not been made out and declared Gichuhi elected.

In May 2017, Day and the also disqualified Rod Culleton were informed by the Commonwealth Department of Finance and by the Senate that payments received by them and in relation to them when they were sitting although unqualified were a debt to the Commonwealth, which should be repaid. Media estimated Day's debt, for the period between 26 February 2016 and his resignation in November, at nearly $130,000. Special Minister of State Scott Ryan indicated that they could apply for the debts to be waived. Day's application for waiver was accepted.

=== Family First legacy ===
The Family First Party was generally considered to be part of the Christian right. Though it had no formal affiliation with any particular religious organisation, Family First was strongly linked to the Pentecostal church in South Australia, and nationally from smaller Christian denominations. Family First in South Australia was viewed as an infusion of ex-Liberals via Robert Brokenshire and Day. Originally advocating a moral and family values agenda, Day, who would become Family First's major donor, later reoriented Family First to begin to emphasise issues such as industrial relations reform, free speech and smaller government, which brought Family First closer to Cory Bernardi's Australian Conservatives. Family First and their two state incumbents merged into Bernardi's Conservatives in April 2017.

== Political views ==
Day is a supporter of the Monarchy of Australia. He rejects anthropogenic climate change and the scientific consensus on climate change, and he opposes policies to reduce atmospheric carbon dioxide. Day is a member of the Saltbush Club, a group that promotes climate change denial.

=== FFP/LDP economic voting bloc and IPA membership ===
Day and David Leyonhjelm of the Liberal Democratic Party announced their intention shortly after the 2013 election to vote as a bloc in the Senate on economic issues, but will vote separately on social issues.

Both Day and Leyonhjelm have long been members of the free market think tank Institute of Public Affairs (IPA).

=== Land use regulation ===
Day advocates sustainable, balanced land and water use which takes into account Australia's scarce resources.

He has expressed his admiration for Houston's approach to zoning. He says they have none, yet there is a vibrant economy and housing prices are low. He claims the relative cost of housing in Australia compared to Houston is related to urban growth boundaries which limit the amount of land available for building.

Day takes the position that Australia's stringent urban planning regulations have the effect of driving home prices up artificially and pricing new and low income home buyers out of the market.

=== Industrial relations ===
Day strongly supports independent contracting as an alternative to the traditional employment relationship. He was the first president (2001–05) of Independent Contractors Australia, which was formed in 1999 "with the objective of protecting the rights of independent contractors in Australia to be treated fairly, justly and equitably and to be allowed to work free from intimidation or harassment from bureaucrats, the Australian Taxation Office, political parties, unions and others". On the website of the Family First Party he stated: "independent contracting offers people a real choice between traditional employment ... and ... arrangements which suit the parties themselves rather than one-size-fits-all, out-dated arrangements which have the added involvement of heavy-handed, self-interested third parties."

As a Liberal, Day had taken a position that WorkChoices, an industrial relations reform enacted in 2005 by the Liberal government of John Howard, did not deregulate the industrial relations system far enough. When he left the party and joined Family First, he supported the party platform which opposed WorkChoices. This position was viewed as a contradiction by Australian political journalist Phillip Coorey, Chief Political Correspondent of The Sydney Morning Herald who wrote in 2008:

In 2002, as secretary of H.R. Nicholls, he blamed the award system for high unemployment and the social ills of drugs, crime, violence, poor health, teenage pregnancy and suicide. In a March 2005 financial forum speech, he likened workplace regulations and protections to "Checkpoint Charlie" as he advocated his idea of workplace nirvana, called "Workforce Superhighway". Employment conditions would be determined solely between employers and employees and "no one else". "Hours of work, rates of pay, holidays, sick leave, long-service leave, hiring and firing, will all be agreed between the two parties". There would be no industrial relations commission and workers could settle disputes through either voluntary mediators or magistrates courts. In a January 2005 newspaper column, he urged a return to when apprentices were indentured to tradesmen and paid a modest wage that started at "10 to 15 per cent" of the tradesman's wage. Yet last week The Courier, a local paper in Mayo, featured a small interview piece with Day. "Even on Work Choices – the controversial industrial relations reform that was the biggest single factor in the Coalition's federal election loss – Mr Day said he shared the same views as his new party, which opposed the unpopular policy." Former fellow Liberals were bent double with laughter. "It's true to say his position was to oppose it but only because he thought Work Choices was too bound up with regulation and red tape," said one former colleague. "He was a complete deregulationist."

In May 2017, federal Employment Minister Michaelia Cash referred to the Fair Work Ombudsman allegations that Day had claimed that staff at Homes Australia were independent contractors on commission-only pay when they were in fact employees and therefore had substantial additional legal entitlements. Day has denied that the contractors were employees. "These guys were very sophisticated. They formed proprietary limited companies to take advantage of all the benefits of being incorporated for tax purposes. They can't have it both ways," he told Fairfax Media.

=== Abortion ===
Day opposes abortion.

=== Same-sex marriage ===
Day opposes same-sex marriage. In June 2016, Day was a guest speaker at the launch of Arise Adelaide, a group staunchly opposed to same-sex marriage and the normalisation of same-sex relationships.

== Personal life ==
Bob and his wife Bronte have three adult children, John, Stephen and Joanna.

Day received his pilots license when he was in his 20s, working two jobs to afford lessons at the Rossair Flying School at Parafield Airport.
