= Division of Mayo =

Australian federal electoral division

Coordinates: 35.521°S 138.029°E

Mayo Australian House of Representatives Division
- Interactive map of boundaries since the 2019 federal election
- Created: 1984
- MP: Rebekha Sharkie
- Party: Centre Alliance
- Namesake: Helen Mayo
- Electors: 137,756 (2025)
- Area: 9,135 km^{2} (3,527.0 sq mi)
- Demographic: Rural

The Division of Mayo (/meɪoʊ/) is an Australian electoral division located to the east and south of Adelaide, South Australia. Created in the state redistribution of 3 September 1984, the division is named after Helen Mayo, a social activist and the first woman elected to an Australian University Council.

The 9,135 km^{2} rural seat covers an area from the Barossa Valley in the north to Cape Jervis in the south. Taking in the Adelaide Hills, Fleurieu Peninsula and Kangaroo Island regions, its largest population centre is Mount Barker.

Its other population centres are Aldgate, Bridgewater, Littlehampton, McLaren Vale, Nairne, Stirling, Strathalbyn and Victor Harbor, and its smaller localities include American River, Ashbourne, Balhannah, Brukunga, Carrickalinga, Charleston, Cherry Gardens, Clarendon, Crafers, Cudlee Creek, Currency Creek, Delamere, Echunga, Forreston, Goolwa, Gumeracha, Hahndorf, Houghton, Inglewood, Kersbrook, Kingscote, Langhorne Creek, Lobethal, Macclesfield, McLaren Flat, Meadows, Middleton, Milang, Mount Compass, Mount Pleasant, Mount Torrens, Mylor, Myponga, Normanville, Norton Summit, Oakbank, Penneshaw, Piccadilly, Port Elliot, Second Valley, Springton, Summertown, Uraidla, Willunga, Woodchester, Woodside, Yankalilla, and parts of Birdwood, Old Noarlunga and Upper Sturt.

== Geography ==
Since 1984, federal electoral division boundaries in Australia have been determined at redistributions by a redistribution committee appointed by the Australian Electoral Commission. Redistributions occur for the boundaries of divisions in a particular state, and they occur every seven years, or sooner if a state's representation entitlement changes or when divisions of a state are malapportioned.

== Electorate history ==
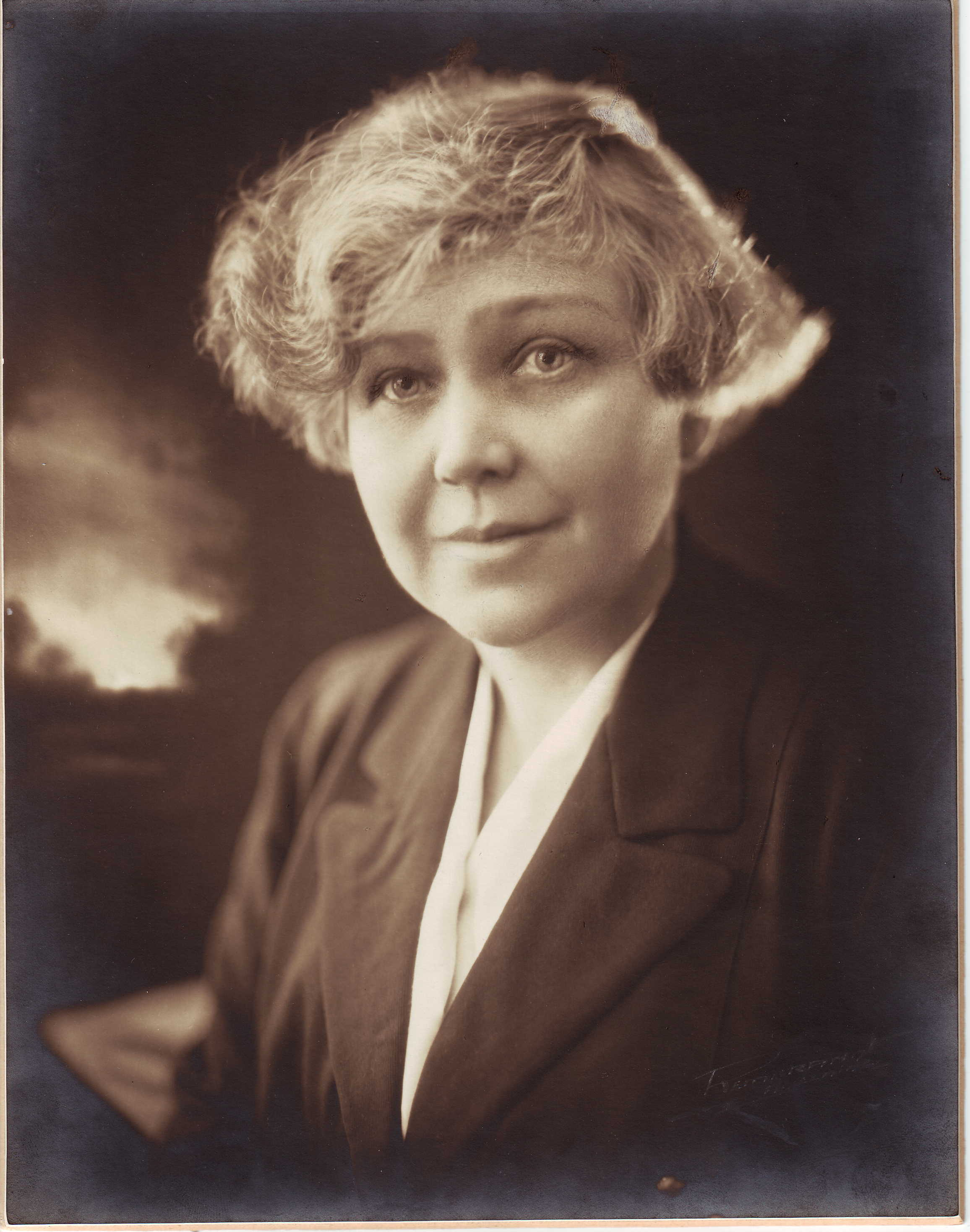
Helen Mayo, the division's namesake

At its creation in 1984, Mayo was a rural electorate that stretched from the seaside town of Victor Harbor to the Adelaide Hills, which had previously been represented mostly by the seats of Barker and Boothby. A safe Liberal seat, it began with a notional 12.3 per cent Liberal two-party margin ahead of the 1984 election. Liberal Alexander Downer retained Mayo for the Liberals and would hold the seat for 24 years.

At the 1990 election, the Australian Democrats, who traditionally polled better in the area covered by Mayo than anywhere else in Australia, first revealed themselves as a real contender in that seat, polling a primary vote of 21.3 per cent from an increase of 11.7 per cent, coming third by just 2 per cent of the primary vote less than Labor. Then-Democrats leader Janine Haines chose to contest the neighbouring Division of Kingston at the 1990 election, obtaining a 26.4 per cent primary vote, but came third well behind the Liberals, with sitting Labor member Gordon Bilney retaining the seat. It was speculated at the time that if the high-profile Haines had contested Mayo instead, she may have been able to defeat Downer—presumably by gaining the additional 2 percent the Democrats needed to overtake Labor for second place, and defeat Downer on Labor preferences.

A redistribution following the 1990 election shifted the Fleurieu Peninsula and Kangaroo Island to Barker, where they had been prior to the creation of Mayo. While this made Mayo an exclusively Hills based seat, the Liberal margin dropped 2 percent to a notionally fairly safe 9.6 two-party margin. It was won at the next two elections on safe margins. At the 1998 election however, high-profile Democrats candidate John Schumann polled a primary vote of 22.4 per cent. He ended up with a two-candidate vote of 48.3 per cent, just 1.7 per cent (3,000 votes) short of taking the seat, making Mayo a marginal seat for the first time. However, on "traditional" two-party terms, it only edged from safe to fairly safe Liberal.

Another redistribution following the 1998 election made Mayo a notionally safe two-party Liberal seat with an extra 1 per cent added to the two-party margin. Downer would be comfortably returned in Mayo until his political retirement. At the 2001 election, Labor returned to second place after preferences. At the 2004 election, independent candidate Brian Deegan polled a 15 per cent primary vote, overtook Labor after preferences, and polled a 38.2 per cent two-candidate vote. Downer recorded his and Mayo's lowest winning two-party result at the 2007 election with a much reduced 7.1 per cent two-party margin after a 6.5 per cent two-party swing.

Downer retired from politics triggering a 2008 Mayo by-election. Labor opted not to run a candidate. Jamie Briggs retained the seat for the Liberals on a 3 per cent two-candidate margin against Greens candidate Lynton Vonow, once again transforming Mayo into a marginal seat. At the 2010 election, the seat was won by the Liberals on a fairly safe two-party margin for only the third time, before once again becoming a safe Liberal seat at the 2013 election.

=== 2016 election onwards and Xenophon ===
South Australian Senator Nick Xenophon confirmed in December 2014 that by mid-2015 the Nick Xenophon Team (NXT) would announce candidates in the South Australian Liberal seats of Hindmarsh, Sturt and Mayo, along with seats in all states and territories at the 2016 election, with Xenophon citing the government's ambiguity on the Collins-class submarine replacement project as motivation. ABC psephologist Antony Green's 2016 federal election guide for South Australia stated NXT had a "strong chance of winning lower house seats and three or four Senate seats". NXT's candidate in Mayo was former Briggs staffer Rebekha Sharkie, who is associated with a wide range of organisations in the Adelaide Hills.

Multiple seat-level opinion polls in Mayo found NXT surprisingly leading the Liberals on the two-candidate vote during the 2016 election campaign. Seat-level opinion polls in the other two rural Liberal South Australian seats, both Grey and Barker, also found NXT leading the Liberals.

Sharkie was successful in defeating Liberal incumbent Briggs in Mayo at the 2016 election with a 55 percent two-candidate vote to the Liberals' 45 percent two-candidate vote. Briggs lost over 16 percent of his primary vote from 2013, and ultimately suffered a two-candidate swing of 17.2 percent. This marked the first time this seat has been out of Liberal hands since its creation. Additionally, Mayo became a marginal seat in a "traditional" two-party matchup for the first time, with the Liberal two-party-preferred vote reduced to 55.4 percent, a swing of 7.2 percent.

Sharkie resigned on 9 May 2018, as a result of the ongoing Australian parliamentary eligibility crisis following the ruling of the High Court that dual British citizens must have completed renunciation of their British citizenship prior to nominating for Australian Parliament with reference to Katy Gallagher. The resignation triggered a by-election, held on 28 July 2018. Sharkie re-contested the seat for her party, now known as the Centre Alliance, and retained it with a modest swing in her favour. Sharkie retained the seat at the 2019 election with an increased majority despite a collapse in voteshare for the Centre Alliance that year.

Sharkie retained her seat in the 2022 election with an increased majority and a swing of 7.12 percent to her.

== Members ==
| Image | Member | Party | Term | Notes |
|---|---|---|---|---|
| | Alexander Downer (1951–) | Liberal | 1 December 1984 – 14 July 2008 | Served as Opposition Leader from 1994 to 1995. Served as minister under Howard. Resigned to retire from politics |
| | Jamie Briggs (1977–) | Liberal | 6 September 2008 – 2 July 2016 | Served as minister under Abbott and Turnbull. Lost seat |
| | Rebekha Sharkie (1972–) | Nick Xenophon Team | 2 July 2016 – 11 May 2018 | Election results declared void due to dual citizenship. Subsequently re-elected. Incumbent |
| | Rebekha Sharkie (1972–) | Centre Alliance | 28 July 2018 – present | Election results declared void due to dual citizenship. Subsequently re-elected. Incumbent |

== Election results ==
2025 Australian federal election: Mayo
| Party | Candidate | Votes | % | ±% |
|---|---|---|---|---|
| Centre Alliance | Rebekha Sharkie | 37,453 | 29.92 | −1.49 |
| Liberal | Zane Basic | 29,551 | 23.61 | −3.42 |
| Labor | Marisa Bell | 26,718 | 21.34 | +3.23 |
| Greens | Genevieve Dawson-Scott | 17,048 | 13.62 | +1.83 |
| One Nation | Rebecca Hewett | 7,493 | 5.99 | +1.88 |
| Trumpet of Patriots | Simeon Bidwell | 3,522 | 2.81 | +1.67 |
| Family First | Ben Hackett | 3,397 | 2.71 | +2.71 |
| Total formal votes | | 125,182 | 96.45 | +1.50 |
| Informal votes | | 4,603 | 3.55 | −1.50 |
| Turnout | | 129,785 | 94.17 | +0.49 |
Notional two-party-preferred count
| Labor | Marisa Bell | 68,820 | 54.98 | +3.39 |
| Liberal | Zane Basic | 56,362 | 45.02 | −3.39 |
Two-candidate-preferred result
| Centre Alliance | Rebekha Sharkie | 81,231 | 64.89 | +2.63 |
| Labor | Marisa Bell | 43,951 | 35.11 | +35.11 |
| Centre Alliance hold | | Swing | +2.63 | |

== See also ==
- 2016 Australian federal election
- Results of the Australian federal election, 2016 (South Australia)
