= David Leyonhjelm =

Australian politician (born 1952)

David Leyonhjelm BVSc, LLB, MBA
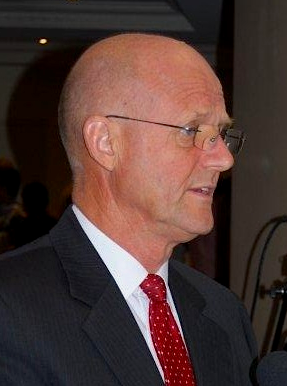

Senator for New South Wales
- In office 1 July 2014 – 1 March 2019
- Preceded by: Ursula Stephens
- Succeeded by: Duncan Spender

Chairman of Outdoor Recreation Party
- In office 4 March 2011 – 10 August 2017
- Succeeded by: Party dissolved

Chairman of the Shooters Party
- In office 27 March 1999 – 26 February 2005
- Preceded by: John Tingle
- Succeeded by: Robert Brown

Personal details
- Born: David Ean Leyonhjelm; 1 April 1952 (age 74) Nhill, Victoria, Australia
- Party: Libertarian (2005–present)
- Other political affiliations: Labor (1969–1975); Liberal (1975–1996); Shooters Party (1996–2005); Outdoor Recreation Party (2005–2017)
- Domestic partner: Amanda Downes
- Education: Dandenong High School
- Alma mater: University of Melbourne (BVSc); Macquarie University (LLB, MBA)
- Occupation: Private Veterinarian (Self-employed); Agribusiness consultant (Baron Strategic Services)
- Profession: Veterinarian businessman
- Website: Official Website

Military service
- Branch/service: Australian Army Reserve
- Years of service: 1982–1983

David Ean Leyonhjelm ( /ˈlaɪənhɛlm/ "lion-helm"; born 1 April 1952) is an Australian former politician. He was a Senator for New South Wales, representing the Liberal Democratic Party from 2014 to 2019. Having been elected at the 2013 federal election, he took office on 1 July 2014, and was re-elected in the 2016 full Senate election. He resigned from the Senate in March 2019 to stand for the Legislative Council at the 2019 New South Wales state election, but failed to be elected. Before being elected to federal parliament, Leyonhjelm worked as a veterinarian and then as an agribusiness consultant. He also writes columns for several Australian publications, with a concentration on rural issues.

== Personal life and business career ==
David Leyonhjelm was born in Nhill in the Wimmera, in western Victoria and was raised in Heywood, on the dairy farm of his parents Bryan and Jean Leyonhjelm. The family is of Swedish noble origin; the 'Leijonhielm' barony was granted in 1719. He was the oldest of four children, and as a teenager trapped rabbits and worked in a shoe shop to help support his family. When he was 15, his parents separated, and he lived with his mother in Melbourne, where he attended Dandenong High School. Leyonhjelm later won a scholarship to study veterinary science at the University of Melbourne, studying alongside Denis Napthine, a future Premier of Victoria. He has since completed Bachelor of Laws and Master of Business Administration degrees at Macquarie University. After gaining his initial degree, he worked as a practising veterinarian for a time, both in Australia and overseas, and later became involved in marketing and management roles in the animal health industry.

In 1989, Leyonhjelm was a founding director of Baron Strategic Services, an agribusiness consultancy firm with which he remains involved. He later served as director of the federally funded Gene Technology Information Unit (GTIU), which was established by the Keating government to offer "accurate and unbiased advice about the new gene technologies". Leyonhjelm lives with his wife, Amanda, in Sydney, but also owns a rural property in Hargraves, a locality near Mudgee in the Central West region of NSW. A shooting enthusiast, he is the president of the Sydney-based Inner West Hunters Club, and takes pleasure in his success in winning his grade in New South Wales for several years, shooting metallic silhouette targets with small-bore pistols. Also a former secretary of the Farm Writers' Association of New South Wales, Leyonhjelm had a column in Rural Business magazine for 20 years. He also wrote a column, "Agribuzz", for Fairfax Rural Media (formerly Rural Press), and for "Business Spectator" and writes regularly in The Australian Financial Review.

== Early political activities ==
Politically, Leyonhjelm was a member of Young Labor during the 1970s with the goal of ending compulsory military conscription. He later joined the Liberal Party, but resigned his membership in 1996 in protest against the stricter firearm laws introduced by John Howard. Leyonhjelm had been a member of the Shooters Party since 1992, and was chair for a period of five years. Having fallen out with its founder, John Tingle, he later left the party in protest at what he perceived as its increasing social conservatism and status as a "single issue party".

In 2005, after leaving the Shooters Party, Leyonhjelm became involved with the Liberal Democratic Party (LDP), which then contested the New South Wales elections as the Outdoor Recreation Party. As secretary of the LDP, he helped the party become federally registered and helped with the campaign for the 2007, 2010, and 2013 federal elections.

Drawing 0.10 percent of the first-preference vote, Leyonhjelm unsuccessfully contested the Division of Bennelong in 2007 for the LDP, which ran as the Liberty and Democracy Party, after the Australian Electoral Commission initially refused to register it under its original name due to the use of the word "Liberal". For the Outdoor Recreation Party, he unsuccessfully contested the 2010 Penrith state by-election, drawing 1.87 percent of the first-preference vote, and then was listed first on the party's group ticket at the 2011 state election, which drew 0.75 percent as a group.

== Parliament ==
Running for the Australian Senate in New South Wales at the 2013 federal election, Leyonhjelm was elected to the fifth of six vacancies. The Liberal Democrats polled 3.91 percent of the first-preference vote based on five states, receiving 523,831 primary votes above the line in NSW. The result for the LDP in New South Wales was partly attributed to the "donkey vote", because the party occupied the first position on a ballot paper with a record number of candidates. Confusion with the Liberal Party of Australia and other similarly-named parties was also thought to have played a part, with a writer in The Age suggesting Leyonhjelm was "probably the only senator elected because people mistook his party for another".

=== 2014 ===
Leyonhjelm assumed his seat on 1 July 2014, and was sworn in on 7 July, making his maiden speech during the same week. In the first sitting week, he successfully moved to have the government's Clean Energy (Income Tax Rates and Other Amendments) Bill considered by itself, instead of being grouped with other legislation. The bill, which subsequently failed to pass, would have repealed personal income tax cuts that were to be introduced as compensation for the carbon tax. In September 2014, he announced that Helen Dale, a writer and lawyer who won the Miles Franklin Award in 1995 (as Helen Demidenko), would be a senior adviser on policy matters. In November 2014, Leyonhjelm introduced as a private member's bill a Freedom to Marry Bill, which would allow same-sex marriage.

Leyonhjelm was criticised following the 2014 Sydney hostage crisis when he argued that Australians should be allowed greater access to weapons for self defence. He put the view that the outcome may have been different if at least some citizens were allowed to be armed.

=== 2015 ===
In August 2015 Leyonhjelm negotiated a deal to include a 12-month sunset clause on the temporary ban on importing the Adler lever action shotgun. The Government imposed the ban in July, while it reviewed the technical specifications of weapons in the wake of the Martin Place Siege. The Federal Government has agreed to allow the importation of the shotgun, in exchange for support on migration laws. A week prior to the ban lapsing as a result of the sunset clause, the Government reimposed the ban.

Leyonhjelm has been a vocal opponent of laws designed to reduce the consumption of cigarettes, and has accepted $55,000 in donations from tobacco company Philip Morris.

Leyonhjelm submitted a private member's bill to the Senate to repeal the ban on territories legalising euthanasia. The bill was voted down in the senate 36-34.

Leyonhjelm and Bob Day of the Family First Party announced their intention shortly after the 2013 election to vote as a bloc in the Senate on economic issues, but to vote separately on social issues. Day has since resigned from the Senate, but Leyonhjelm has stated he intends to form a new voting bloc with his successor from Family First, as well as Cory Bernardi from the Australian Conservatives. Leyonhjelm has since formed a bloc with Bernardi, United Australia Party Senator Brian Burston and independent Senator Fraser Anning, who left One Nation and has since been expelled from Katter's Australian Party. Both Leyonhjelm and Day have long been members of the free market think tank Institute of Public Affairs (IPA).

=== 2016 ===
During the 2016 Australian federal election campaign, Leyonhjelm attracted criticism after he suggested women's sport was not "interesting enough" to receive government funding, in response to Labor's proposal to increase the amount of women's sport broadcast on Australian television. Labor leader Bill Shorten responded, calling Leyonhjelm a "stone age man".

During the same campaign, the satirical television show The Chaser's Election Desk parked a campervan across the road from Leyonhjelm's house daubed in Wicked Campers slogans that Leyonhjelm had previously defended, with Leyonhjelm's name replacing derogatory references to women in the original slogans. Leyonjhelm reacted by threatening to call the police and told the Chaser team to "fuck off". He subsequently told women's rights activist Melinda Tankard Reist to "STFU" (for "shut the fuck up") when she accused him of hypocrisy.

Speaking to BBC News in November 2016, Leyonhjelm questioned the motives and integrity of anti-poverty charity workers, particularly with regard to a conflict of interest in the continuation of their own employment as opposed to their elimination of poverty and thus their obsolescence: "The people who work for those charities have their careers tied up in the continuation of that charitable work. If they were too successful and poverty was eliminated, they wouldn't have jobs anymore. They have a very long history in Australia of talking up poverty."

Leyonhjelm wanted the government-funded age pension payment to be viewed as welfare and not an entitlement for taxpayers once they reach a certain age. He told ABC News: "Taking the pension shouldn't be something you aspire to, it should be something you try to avoid because it signifies you're in a low income group – in other words you're poor or you know, close to poor,"

He also opposed the censorship of video games and criticised the Australian Classification Board claiming, "How is it that adults are not trusted to make choices about video games, and yet they are allowed to vote?", and asked the government to "leave video gamers alone." Destructoid called him "the hero Australia deserves".

=== 2017 ===
Soon after the January 2017 Melbourne car attack, in which a driver hit and killed six people and injured many others, Leyonhjelm posted to Twitter a link to a headline "BREAKING: It's feared at least one pedestrian has been hit in the Bourke St Mall by a rogue car driving erratically. More Soon.", with the comment "Probably one of those semi-automatic assault cars." Responding to calls for his resignation, Leyonhjelm suggested critics fill out an official complaint, posting a "Hurt Feelings Complaint Form".

=== 2018 ===
In 2018, Leyonhjelm told Australian Greens senator Sarah Hanson-Young to "fuck off" and "stop shagging men", during a debate of a bill moved by Katter's Australian Party senator Fraser Anning to allow the importation of pepper spray, mace and tasers for women's self-defence. Leyonhjelm claimed that was in response to Hanson-Young saying "women wouldn't need pepper spray if men weren't rapists", and that his comment for her to "fuck off" was prompted by her approaching him after the debate and calling him a "creep". He later made claims of Hanson-Young's sexual promiscuity on national television, claiming he was responding appropriately to a statement which he said categorised all men as rapists. Leyonhjelm defended himself by claiming that he was calling out sexism and misandry. When challenged, Leyonhjelm pointed to an interview in which he claimed Hanson-Young accused all men of being rapists, although this was rejected by the senator. On 14 August 2018, the Greens moved a motion in the Senate to censure Leyonhjelm for his remarks against Hanson-Young, which was passed by 30 votes to 28.

=== 2019 ===
On 7 January 2019, Leyonhjelm announced that he intended to quit federal politics to contest the 2019 New South Wales state election on 23 March 2019. He resigned from the Australian Senate on 1 March 2019. He was the second Senator since the 2016 election to resign from Federal Parliament to contest a state election, following Nick Xenophon's unsuccessful run at the 2018 South Australian state election. Leyonhjelm's bid to win a place in the NSW Legislative Council was unsuccessful.

In November, Senator Hanson-Young was awarded $120,000 in damages after winning a defamation case in the Federal Court against Leyonhjelm over interviews he gave following his "stop shagging men" comment in Parliament. The judge ruled that Leyonhjelm had acted with malice and intended to publicly shame Hanson-Young.

=== 2020 ===
Leyonhjelm was due to pay Senator Hanson-Young's legal costs and the associated settlement by the end of 2019 but chose not to do so as he was appealing against the defamation decision, partly on the ground of the implied constitutional freedom of political communication. The appeal was dismissed in March 2021.

In July 2020, Leyonhjelm expressed dismay at the Australian public's response to increased use of governmental power during the Covid-19 pandemic, describing Australians as "sheeple".

== Political views ==
Leyonhjelm has been described as a "libertarian purist" who wants government "wound back to a minimal role in society". In interviews, he has stated that he was initially drawn towards socialism, but turned away from it after travelling to socialist countries in Africa and Eastern Europe and was later influenced by the writings of economist Milton Friedman. His election has been associated with a rise in the popularity of libertarian and classical liberal ideas in Australia, with one commentator suggesting his election might "spark a libertarian renaissance [in Australia]".

In the 44th parliament, along with seventeen other crossbenchers (including 10 Greens, independents and representatives from four other parties), the Liberal Democrats shared the balance of power in the Senate.

He supported the repeal of the Minerals Resource Rent Tax and carbon tax, but opposed the Abbott government's proposed paid parental leave and "direct action" on climate change schemes as "bad in principle" and "a waste of taxpayers' money", respectively. The LDP's position on climate change is that the scientific evidence is not yet "compelling" and that "changes in human activity could realistically reverse those consequences", but the party "would favour market-based options" if the science is confirmed by further study. Notably, Leyonhjelm has proposed charging a fee for permanent residency in Australia as a way of discouraging people smuggling.

He also supports same-sex marriage, the decriminalisation of marijuana and assisted suicide.

In his "Agribuzz" column, he generally advocates deregulating the Australian agriculture industry, including removing barriers to free trade, genetically modified organisms and foreign ownership of Australian land.

Leyonhjelm supports the removal of the words "offend" and "insult" from Section 18C of the Racial Discrimination Act 1975, arguing that "offence is always taken, not given". Upon being described as an "angry white male" for seeking to amend Section 18C, Leyonhjelm lodged a complaint with the Human Rights Commission, arguing that this is a breach of 18C.

== Books ==
- Freedom's Salesman: Collected Articles and Speeches by Australia's Senator for Liberty, Melbourne: Wilkinson Publishing, 2017.
- Gun Control: What Australia did, how other countries do it & is any of it sensible?, Brisbane: Connor Court Publishing, 2020.

== Essays ==
- "Factory Farming Is Essential to Feed the World", in: Factory Farming, Debra A. Miller, ed., Detroit: Greenhaven Press, a part of Gale, Cengage Learning, 2013.

== See also ==
- Members of the Australian Senate, 2014–2016
- Members of the Australian Senate, 2016–2019
