= 2008 Mayo by-election =

- 6 September 2008

Division of Mayo (SA) in the House of Representatives
- Turnout: 80.10% ▼15.78
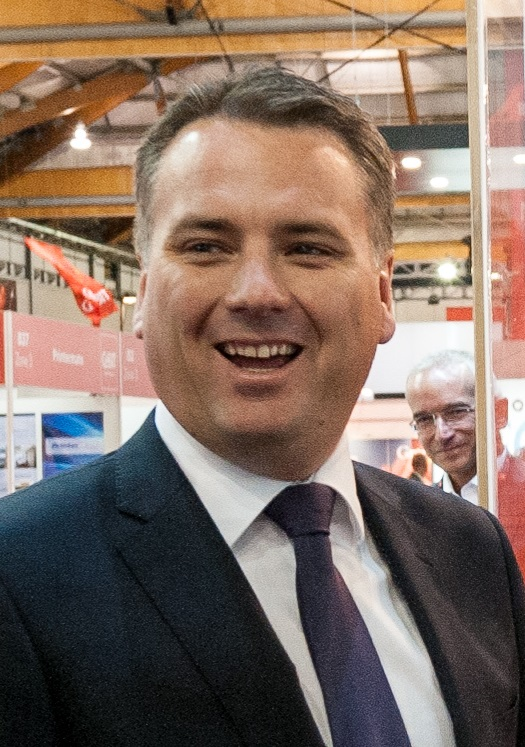

	First party	Second party
Candidate	Jamie Briggs	Lynton Vonow
Party	Liberal	Greens
Primary vote	30,651	15,851
Percentage	41.28%	21.35%
Swing	▼9.80	▲10.39
TPP	53.03%	46.97%
TPP swing	▼4.03	▲46.97
	Third party	Fourth party
	IND
Candidate	Di Bell	Bob Day
Party	Independent	Family First
Primary vote	12,081	11,468
Percentage	16.87%	11.40%
Swing	▲16.87	▲7.38
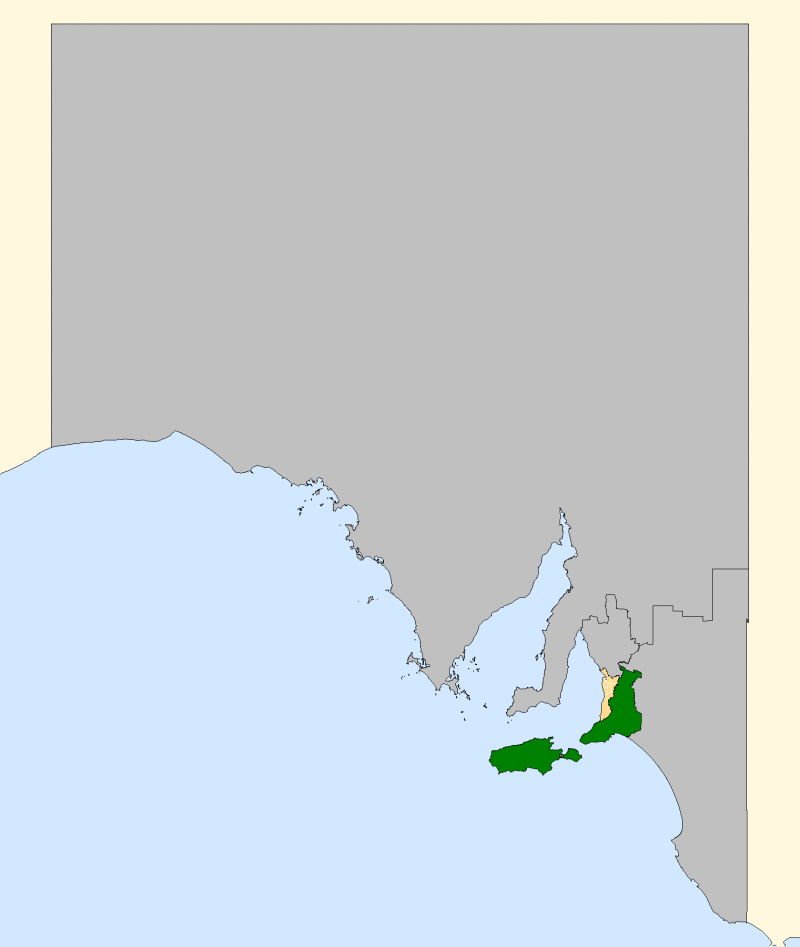
MP before election
Alexander Downer
Liberal
Elected MP
Jamie Briggs
Liberal

The 2008 Mayo by-election was held on 6 September 2008 to elect the member for Mayo in the Australian House of Representatives, following the retirement of Liberal Party MP and former Liberal leader Alexander Downer. The by-election was held on the same day as the Lyne by-election, and the Western Australian state election.

The writ for the by-election was issued 4 August, with the rolls closing on 8 August. Candidate nominations closed on 14 August. The by-election was contested on the same boundaries drawn for Mayo at the 2007 federal election. The seat was won by Jamie Briggs of the Liberal Party on a two-candidate preferred vote of 53 per cent against the Greens.

== Background ==
Downer first won the seat of Mayo at its creation at the 1984 federal election. He retained the seat at each subsequent election. The 2007 Liberal two-party-preferred vote of 57.1 percent was at the time the narrowest in the seat's history. Except for 1998, the seat was won at each election by the Liberals on primary votes alone. Despite this, the Australian Democrats and independents have traditionally polled well, including two elections where the Democrats and independent Brian Deegan came second. At the 1998 election the Democrats reduced the Mayo Liberal margin to just 1.7 percent.

At the 2007 federal election, Downer retained his seat against his main Labor Party competitor by a two-party preferred vote of 57.06 percent to 42.94 percent. However, the opposition Labor Party defeated the incumbent Liberal-National coalition government, the first change of government in over 11 years. Downer had served as Foreign Minister throughout the duration of the previous government. He was also Liberal leader and leader of the opposition for several months in 1994.

On 3 July 2008, Downer announced his intention to resign his seat. He officially resigned from parliament on 14 July. He, with Mark Vaile in Lyne, became the next former Howard government ministers returned at the 2007 election to resign their seats. Peter McGauran had done likewise earlier in 2008.

== Candidates ==
Eleven candidates contested the by-election. They are listed below in ballot order.

- Australian Greens – Lynton Vonow, Adelaide Hills resident, school services officer.
- Conservatives for Climate and Environment – Rachael Barons.
- Independent – Bill Spragg, Adelaide Hills councillor and lecturer in information technology at TAFE SA, who had also contested Mayo in 2001.
- One Nation – Mathew Keizer, Adelaide Hills resident and domestic community support worker.
- Independent – Mary Brewerton, retired nurse, contested Mayo for Labor in 2007.
- Australian Democrats – Andrew Castrique, Adelaide Hills resident, school laboratory technician.
- Liberal Party of Australia – Jamie Briggs, former Howard government advisor
- Independent – Malcolm Ronald King, retired.
- Family First Party – Bob Day, businessman and former Liberal Party member.
- Democratic Labor Party – David McCabe, clerk.
- Independent – Di Bell, anthropologist and author. South Australian independent Senator Nick Xenophon gave support to Bell's campaign.

Labor opted not to stand a candidate.

== Liberal preselection ==
The candidature of Liberal Jamie Briggs was criticised because of his role in controversial industrial-relations policies and reports that some Liberal Party colleagues were unhappy with his preselection. Bob Day, who had held membership of the Liberal Party for 20 years and was the endorsed Liberal candidate for Makin in 2007, quit the party after failing to win Mayo preselection with 10 out of 271 votes, claiming a "manipulated" preselection process. Iain Evans, who came second to Briggs, agreed to some extent.

== Results ==
2008 Mayo by-election
Party	Candidate	Votes	%	±%
Liberal	Jamie Briggs	30,651	41.28	–9.80
Greens	Lynton Vonow	15,851	21.35	+10.39
Independent	Di Bell	12,081	16.27	+16.27
Family First	Bob Day	8,468	11.40	+7.38
Independent	Mary Brewerton	1,868	2.52	+2.52
Independent	Bill Spragg	1,545	2.08	+2.08
Democratic Labor	David McCabe	1,426	1.92	+1.92
Democrats	Andrew Castrique	923	1.24	–0.28
Climate Conservatives	Rachael Barons	725	0.98	–0.32
One Nation	Mathew Keizer	503	0.68	+0.68
Independent	Malcolm Ronald King	219	0.29	+0.29
Total formal votes		74,260	95.01	–2.23
Informal votes		3,900	4.99	+2.23
Turnout		78,160	80.10	–15.78
Two-candidate-preferred result
Liberal	Jamie Briggs	39,381	53.03	–4.03
Greens	Lynton Vonow	34,879	46.97	+46.97
Liberal hold				

The Liberals retained the seat despite a reduced 41.3 percent primary vote after suffering a 9.8 percent primary swing. Some commentators drew comparisons between this and the 2002 Cunningham by-election. The Liberal two-candidate vote of 53 percent against Greens candidate Lynton Vonow compared to the previous election vote of 57.1 percent against Labor, which turned Mayo from a fairly safe seat in to a marginal two-candidate seat. The reduction of 4 percent cannot be considered a "two-party/candidate preferred swing" − when a major party is absent, preference flows to both major parties does not take place, resulting in asymmetric preference flows.

== 2016 outcome ==
Eight years later, Rebekha Sharkie of the Nick Xenophon Team was successful in defeating Liberal incumbent Jamie Briggs in Mayo at the 2016 federal election with a 55 percent two-candidate vote to the Liberals' 45 percent two-candidate vote, a reduction of 17.2 percent. Additionally, Mayo became a marginal two-party seat for the first time with the Liberal two-party vote reduced to 55.4 percent, a two-party swing of 7.2 percent.

== See also ==
- List of Australian federal by-elections
