= Ken Canning =

Australian poet

- Burraga Gutya
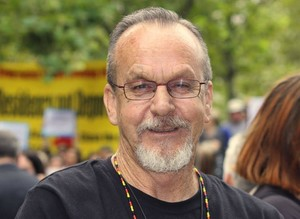
- Born: Frankston, Victoria, Australia
- Education: University of Technology Sydney
- Occupations: Poet; Indigenous activist

Ken Canning is a Murri activist, writer and poet, whose people are from the Kunja Clan of the Bidjara Nation in south west Queensland, Australia. Canning now lives and teaches in Sydney. Ken works with the Rainbow Lodge program where he supports Aboriginal men leaving custody.

== Biography ==
In his youth he spent time in boys homes and later sent to Boggo Road Gaol. While in prison Canning learned to read and write, before he turned to poetry as a form of release.

His activism for equal rights for Indigenous Australians led him to education in the 1980s. He was one of the founding members of Jumbunna Indigenous House of Learning at the University of Technology Sydney, working with Indigenous students at a tertiary level.

Canning's poetry has been translated into several languages and he's now finished writing his first major play, 49 Days a Week, which is one of 6 plays picked nationally for the Yellamundie Festival in Sydney 2017. He has also recently written a half hour film script titled Cocky on a Biscuit Tin, which will eventually be written as a novel. His poetry has been noted for its combination of Indigenous language and English, as well as its blunt, understated and visceral language. His poetry is published under his Aboriginal language name, Burraga Gutya.

Canning was the lead candidate for the New South Wales Socialist Alliance ticket for the Australian Senate in the 2016 federal election, under the title "For A People's Movement". After helping to organise the 2016 Invasion Day protest in Sydney, Canning said the 5000-strong march was being hailed as "the biggest march by Aboriginal peoples since 1988".

== Published works ==
- Canning, Ken (1990). Ngali Ngalga (let's talk): poetry. Breakout Press. ISBN 978-0-646-00673-4.
- Canning, Ken; Queensland Corrective Services Commission; Australian Catholic University (Qld.); Weemala Higher Education Centre (1996). Art from the inside. s.n.
- Burraga Gutya, C (2009). Advance Australia What?.
- Canning, Ken; Quejada-Canning, Cheryl Bucaneg, (artist.) (2015). Yimbama. Newtown, New South Wales: Vagabond Press. ISBN 978-1-922181-43-5.
