= Lucy Gichuhi =

Australian politician

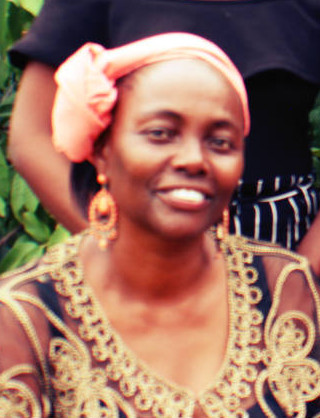

Senator for South Australia
- In office 19 April 2017 – 30 June 2019
- Preceded by: Bob Day
- Succeeded by: Alex Antic

Personal details
- Born: Lucy Muringo Munyiri; 23 September 1962 (age 64) Hiriga, Kenya
- Citizenship: Kenyan (1962–2001); Australian (2001–present)
- Party: Family First (Before 2017); Independent (2017–2018); Liberal Party (2018–present)
- Education: University of Nairobi (BS); University of South Australia (LLB)
- Website: Official website

Lucy Muringo Gichuhi (/ɡɪˈtʃuːi/; née Munyiri; born 23 September 1962) is an Australian politician who served as a Senator for South Australia from 2017 to 2019. Born in Kenya, Gichuhi worked as an accountant before entering politics. Gichuhi is a social conservative who has been vocally opposed to the legalisation of same-sex marriage.

Following a special recount ordered by the Court of Disputed Returns, in April 2017 she was declared to have been elected at the 2016 election for the Family First Party. This followed the court's decision that Bob Day had not been eligible to stand for election. She was Australia's first African Senator. Gichuhi originally sat in the Senate as an independent, after refusing to join the Family First Party in merging into the Australian Conservatives. She joined the Liberal Party in February 2018, but failed to win re-election at the 2019 federal election.

== Before politics ==
Gichuhi grew up in the rural village of Hiriga, Nyeri County, Kenya Colony (present day Hiraga, Nyeri County, Kenya). Between school, she worked to gather food from the garden or help milk the family's cows.

Gichuhi is the first of her father Justus Weru Munyiri's ten children. Her father and brother still live in her ancestral home in Hiriga village in Mathira East sub-county Nyeri.

She moved to Nairobi where she trained as an accountant at the University of Nairobi. She was an accountant with various auditing firms before moving to South Australia in 1999 with her husband William and three children. She worked at Ernst and Young and the South Australian Auditor-General's department developing programs for migrants and international students. She completed a Bachelor of Law from the University of South Australia in 2015. Prior to her appointment to the Senate, she was volunteering as a lawyer for the Women's Legal Service.

== Election ==
Family First leader Bob Day had been his party's lead Senate candidate in South Australia at the election on 2 July 2016, with Gichuhi the second and only other (a ticket—with its advantage of attracting votes above the line, which is how most electors vote—requires a minimum of two candidates). The party received 24,817 votes above the line; below the line, Day received 5,495 votes and Gichuhi 152.

Day resigned on 1 November 2016 after the collapse of his home-building business, and was retroactively disqualified on 5 April 2017 for having an indirect interest in a building where the Commonwealth was paying rent for his Commonwealth-funded electorate office. At the High Court's direction, the Australian Electoral Commission performed a special recount of Senate votes in South Australia. The Court envisaged that this would result in Gichuhi replacing Day. With Day excluded, all Family First votes above the line flowed to Gichuhi, and she was elected in the recount. Her election and term were dated from 1 July 2016, in common with all Senators elected in 2016. She was elected to serve the balance of Day's term, which was set at three years rather than the usual six owing to the 2016 election being a double dissolution; as a result, her term was due to end on 30 June 2019.

=== Citizenship ===
Senator Gichuhi was born in Kenya and is the first person of Black African descent to be elected to the Australian Parliament.

Before her election, the Australian Labor Party challenged Gichuhi's eligibility on citizenship grounds in the High Court, however Kenya did not allow dual citizenship and she became an Australian citizen in July 2001, two years after her arrival in 1999. The Constitution of Kenya that was current at the time meant that any person who voluntarily applied for the citizenship elsewhere lost his or her Kenyan citizenship. Since 2010, Kenya has allowed dual citizenship; however, people who had lost their citizenship under the old law are required to apply if they wish to regain it. The High Court rejected the Australian Labor Party's challenge to her eligibility. Later, Parliament changed the retroactive date of her term to 19 April 2017, when her eligibility was finally decided.

=== Party status ===
On 25 April 2017, Family First announced it was merging with the Australian Conservatives party founded by Cory Bernardi. Gichuhi told the leaders of both parties that she had no intention of joining the Conservatives, and would sit as an independent when Family First was disbanded. The Senate counted her as part of the Family First Party up to 3 May 2017 and as an independent from that date up to 1 February 2018.

On 2 February 2018, Gichuhi joined the Liberals, with Prime Minister Malcolm Turnbull personally welcoming her to the party in a video posted to his Twitter account. Gichuhi said that she realised "how Liberal I am at the core" when she gave her maiden speech a year earlier. She had already been voting with the Coalition fairly often since taking her Senate seat.

In July 2018, Gichuhi was demoted to an unwinnable fourth position on the Liberal Party's South Australian Senate ticket for the next federal election. Endorsements from Turnbull, former Prime Minister John Howard and state Liberal president John Olsen were not enough to prevent her from being bypassed in favour of City of Adelaide councillor Alex Antic for the third slot on the ticket. Although she is an ardent social conservative, she never won favour among the SA Liberals' conservative faction, even though Olsen–a former premier and himself a conservative–played a key role in wooing her to the Liberals.

In September, Gichuhi revealed that she was asked during her preselection process if she thought Turnbull was the right person to lead the Liberal Party.

At the 2019 election, Gichuhi only garnered 2,500 votes, and she failed to retain her seat. As a result, her Senate term ended on 30 June 2019.

== Political views ==
Despite having grown up in rural Kenya, Gichuhi says that the concept of poverty never entered her mind, and she is firmly against government handouts as she believes "they create victims and nobody wins". She said her Christian faith was the backbone of her political beliefs, but strongly supports freedom of religion.

She is a public opponent of same sex marriage, and stated that she would vote against any proposed bill, regardless of the results of the Australian Marriage Law Postal Survey. On 29 November 2017 when the bill was voted in the Senate, Gichuhi was one of twelve senators who voted against it.

In January 2018, Gichuhi visited Kenya and was the guest on television talk show Jeff Koinange Live hosted by Jeff Koinange on Citizen TV. In June 2018, a clip from this interview was widely reported in Australia quoting that she had said that her $200,000 salary in Australia is "not a lot of money".

== Personal life ==
Gichuhi had three daughters with her husband William. Her oldest daughter Peris Wanjiru died in 2021 at the age of 33.
