= Jamie Briggs =

Australian politician (born 1977)

The Honourable Jamie Briggs
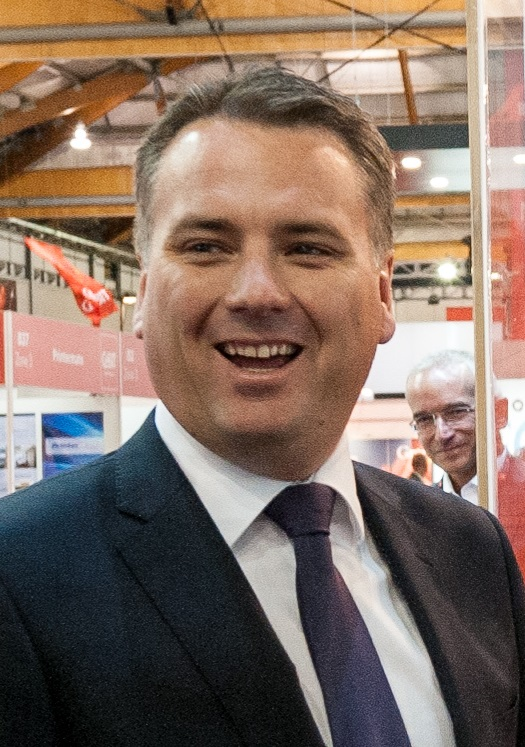

Minister for Cities and the Built Environment
- In office 18 September 2013 – 29 December 2015
- Prime Minister: Tony Abbott; Malcolm Turnbull
- Preceded by: Sharon Bird (as Minister for Regional Development and Minister for Road Safety)
- Succeeded by: Paul Fletcher

Member of the Australian Parliament for Mayo
- In office 6 September 2008 – 2 July 2016
- Preceded by: Alexander Downer
- Succeeded by: Rebekha Sharkie

Personal details
- Born: 9 June 1977 (age 49) Kyneton, Victoria
- Party: Liberal Party of Australia
- Spouse: Estée
- Children: Three
- Occupation: Politician, political advisor

Jamie Edward Briggs (born 9 June 1977) is an Australian politician, who represented the House of Representatives seat of Mayo for the Liberal Party of Australia from the 2008 Mayo by-election to the 2 July 2016 federal election. Briggs was promoted from a shadow parliamentary secretary role to the outer ministry upon the 2013 election of the Abbott government. He remained in the outer ministry, though with a change in portfolio in the Turnbull government; however, he quit the ministry and moved to the backbench in late 2015 following inappropriate conduct during an official overseas trip. Briggs lost his seat in the 2016 federal election to Nick Xenophon Team candidate Rebekha Sharkie. Since 2024 Briggs has worked as a political advisor.

== Background ==
Briggs grew up in the River Murray town of Mildura, where his father was a local bank teller and his mother volunteered in the canteen at the Sacred Heart Catholic primary school. He attended St Joseph's College where he excelled in cricket before moving to Adelaide to pursue his dreams of playing for Australia. Briggs became a member of the Liberal Party in 1999 and was on the Liberal Party State Council from 2000 to 2002. He was an employment relations adviser for Business SA from 2000 to 2002. In 2002, he started working for the then South Australian Treasurer, Rob Lucas, before moving to Canberra in 2003 to work for Kevin Andrews in the Howard government. From 2004 to 2007 he was a senior advisor for WorkChoices to the prime minister, John Howard.

== Political career ==
Briggs was pre-selected as the Liberal Party of Australia candidate for the 2008 Mayo by-election to replace former Liberal leader and minister Alexander Downer. In the absence of a Labor candidate, Briggs won the seat with a reduced 53.03 percent two-candidate vote against the Greens, in comparison to the 2007 election with a 57.1 percent two-party vote against Labor. The Liberal two-party vote was increased to 57.4 percent at the 2010 election and to 62.5 percent at the 2013 election.

After the 2010 election Briggs was given the position of chair of the Coalition's Scrutiny of Government Waste Committee as part of the opposition led by Tony Abbott. In September 2012, Briggs was appointed to the Opposition frontbench as the Shadow Parliamentary Secretary for Supporting Families. As part of his role as the Chairman of the Coalition's Scrutiny of Government Committee, Briggs wrote The Little Book of Big Labor Waste with the Leader of the Opposition, Tony Abbott, and the Shadow Treasurer, Joe Hockey. It was published on 13 May 2013. Briggs has also pursued the Gillard government over a Freedom of Information decision to refuse access to Greens policy costings.

=== Ministry promotion and resignation ===
After the 2013 election of the Abbott government, Briggs, an Abbott loyalist, was appointed promoted from a shadow parliamentary secretary position to the outer ministry as Assistant Minister for Infrastructure and Regional Development.

Briggs was on crutches with an injured leg after a failed crash tackle on Abbott at a boisterous late-night party in Abbott's office on the night he was deposed as Prime Minister in September 2015. For the next two months, Briggs insisted that he had damaged his anterior cruciate ligament while jogging the following morning, and had not been not involved in shattering an expensive Italian marble table in Abbott's office. It was expected that the damage to the table would be repaired at the taxpayer's expense, but Abbott later said he would pay for it.

On 20 September 2015, in the incoming Turnbull government, Briggs' portfolio in the outer ministry was changed to Minister for Cities and the Built Environment. Turnbull had initially dumped Briggs from the ministry, but when Bruce Billson declined to remain, Briggs was reinstated.

Following a late-night incident in a Hong Kong bar, involving Briggs and a female DFAT staffer, during an official visit in November, Prime Minister Malcolm Turnbull asked Briggs to "consider his position". On 29 December 2015, Briggs quit the First Turnbull Ministry and moved to the backbench. Briggs acknowledged that his behaviour had not met the "particularly high standards required of ministers", although he said that nothing illegal had occurred. According to The Australian Financial Review, "government sources" claimed Briggs was accused of sexual harassment. According to The Adelaide Advertiser: "It is understood Mr Briggs told her she had piercing eyes, then later put his arm around her. As the trio was leaving, Mr Briggs gave the female public servant a kiss on the cheek". Other reports suggested the kiss was on the neck.

Briggs' wife Estée, a former Liberal staffer, responded hours later on Facebook by posting a family picture of the two along with their three young children, and reportedly said the scandal was a "complete exaggeration and over-reaction". With Turnbull becoming aware of the incident on 5 December, questions were raised over the "unusually long time" between the complaint and the resignation, as well as the timing of the announcement during the holiday period. Minutes after Briggs' press conference, Mal Brough also stood aside from the First Turnbull Ministry due to an investigation by the Australian Federal Police over the alleged copying of the diary of former speaker Peter Slipper. The two resignations led to a ministerial re-shuffle.

Briggs announced that he intended to re-contest the Liberal seat of Mayo at the 2016 federal election and to return to the ministry one day. Following the announcement of his resignation, despite claiming that he would not identify her, Briggs distributed a photograph of the complainant to some colleagues. The photograph later appeared in a national newspaper, along with sufficient detail to identify the woman.

In April 2016, Briggs supported calls from two state Liberal parliamentarians for seal culling in South Australia, after witnessing a "massacre" of dozens of fairy penguins on Kangaroo Island.

=== 2016 election ===
Briggs was beaten at the 2016 federal election by his former staffer Rebekha Sharkie, who successfully contested Mayo for the Nick Xenophon Team. He lost over 16 percent of his primary vote from 2013, and finished just three percent ahead of Sharkie on the first count. Ultimately, Sharkie defeated Briggs after the distribution of preferences.

In September 2024 Briggs was hired as a political advisor to opposition leader Peter Dutton. He served in this role during the 2025 Australian federal election.

== Personal life ==
Briggs is married to former Liberal staffer Estée Fiebiger and has three children. He lives in Aldgate, South Australia.

Parliament of Australia
| Preceded by Alexander Downer | Member for Mayo; 2008–2016 | Succeeded by Rebekha Sharkie |
Political offices
| Preceded by Sharon Bird as Minister for Regional Development and Minister for Road Safety | Assistant Minister for Infrastructure and Regional Development; 2013–2015 | Succeeded by Paul Fletcher as Minister for Major Projects, Territories and Local Government |
| New title | Minister for Cities and the Built Environment; 2015 | Succeeded by to be determined |
