= Brian Deegan (lawyer) =

Australian political activist and magistrate

- Born: 14 February 1955 (age 71); Adelaide, South Australia
- Education: University of Adelaide
- Occupations: Magistrate and lawyer
- Notable work: Remembering Josh: Bali, a father's story
- Political party: Independent
- Spouses: Angela (m. 1979) Virginia (m. 1988)
- Children: Four

Brian Deegan (born 14 February 1955) is an Australian political activist and former South Australian magistrate.

He was born in Adelaide and studied law at University of Adelaide. He graduated in 1979 and practised criminal and matrimonial law. In 1988 he was appointed a South Australian magistrate.

Deegan's son Joshua was an Australian rules football player who was one of 202 people killed by Islamic terrorists in the October 2002 Bali bombings. Josh was on a post-season Indonesian holiday with his teammates from the Sturt Football Club, which had just won the South Australian National Football League premiership.

Following Joshua's death, Brian Deegan became a vocal critic of the foreign policy of the government led by John Howard, the then Australian Prime Minister.

In November 2002 he wrote an open letter to Howard, linking the Bali bombings to Australia's role in the war on terror. In 2003 he was critical of the government using the Bali bombings to justify its support for the Iraq War.

In the 2004 federal election he took part in the 'Not happy, John!' campaign. He resigned as magistrate in July, to stand as an independent against Foreign Minister Alexander Downer in the seat of Mayo in South Australia. He achieved over 15 per cent on the primary vote, overtook Labor on preferences, and finished second to Downer, on a two party preferred figure of 38.19 per cent.

In the 2008 Mayo by-election, Deegan decided not to stand again as an independent candidate in order to retain his private legal practice.

He wrote a book titled Remembering Josh: Bali, a father's story.

== Personal ==
He married his first wife Angela in 1979, and had two sons, Josh and Nick. He married his second wife Virginia in 1988, and had two further children, Patrick and Eloise.
