= Liberal–National Coalition =

Coalition of centre-right political parties in Australia

- Abbreviation: LNP (Note: The abbreviation "LNP" is used both for the federal Coalition and for the merged Queensland-based branch of the alliance, the Liberal National Party.); L/NP
- Leader: Angus Taylor
- Deputy Leader: Matt Canavan
- Founded: See list: 1923 (Nationalist–Country); 1934 (United Australia–Country); 1940 (United Australia–Country); 1946 (Liberal–Country); 14 June 1974 (Liberal–Country); 14 August 1987 (Liberal–National); 28 May 2025 (Liberal–National); 8 February 2026 (Liberal–National)
- Dissolved: Previous dissolutions: 1929 (Nationalist–Country); 1939 (United Australia–Country); 1943 (United Australia–Country); 1972 (Liberal–Country); 28 April 1987 (Liberal–National); 20 May 2025 (Liberal–National); 22 January 2026 (Liberal–National)
- Ideology: Liberal conservatism; Conservatism (Australian); Liberalism (Australian); Agrarianism
- Political position: Centre-right to right-wing
- Colours: Blue
- Federal member parties: Liberal; National
- State/territory member parties: Liberal: ACT; NSW; SA; Tas; Vic; WA (Note: In Western Australia, the Liberals and Nationals have an agreement where each party can make independent decisions but members are still invited to join the Cabinet or (if in Opposition) the Shadow Cabinet.); National: NSW; Vic; WA; Merged: Qld (LNP); NT (CLP)
- State coalitions: NSW; Vic
- House of Representatives: 41 / 150
- Senate: 27 / 76

The Liberal–National Coalition, commonly known as the Coalition or the LNP, is an alliance of liberal conservative and centre-right political parties in Australia. Its primary members are the Liberal Party of Australia and the National Party of Australia (previously known as the Country Party and the National Country Party). It is one of the two major groupings in Australian politics, and its main rival is the Australian Labor Party. The Coalition was last in government federally from 2013 to 2022.

The Coalition has existed in some form since 1923, initially involving the Liberal Party's predecessors, the Nationalist Party and United Australia Party. It has historically been a stable alignment for long periods in both government and opposition, including at three elections where the Liberal Party won enough seats to govern in its own right. The stability between the parties (and their predecessors) has been punctuated by seven breaks in the agreement, including the 1931, 1934 and 1987 federal elections, which the parties contested separately. Its longest iteration spanned 38 years after its reestablishment in 1987, which was followed by its shortest iteration of under a year after the eight-day split in the aftermath of the 2025 election, which itself was brought to an end on 22 January 2026 after the National Party again left the union. The Coalition reunited on 8 February 2026.

The Liberal and National parties have different geographical voter bases, with the Liberals—the senior party—drawing most of their vote from urban areas, and the Nationals operating almost exclusively in rural and regional areas. They occupy a broadly similar place on the right of the political spectrum. The Liberals and Nationals maintain separate organisational wings and separate parliamentary parties, but have cooperated in various ways determined by a mixture of formal agreements and informal conventions. There is a single Coalition frontbench, both in government and in opposition, with each party receiving a proportionate number of positions. By convention, the leader of the Liberal Party serves as the overall leader, serving as prime minister when the Coalition was in government and leader of the opposition when the Coalition was in opposition. The leader of the National Party became the deputy prime minister during periods of Coalition government. The two parties cooperated on their federal election campaigns, ran joint Senate tickets in New South Wales and Victoria, and generally avoided running candidates against each other in the House of Representatives.

A merger of the Liberals and Nationals has been suggested on several occasions, but has never become a serious proposition at the federal level. The relationship between the two parties varies at state and territory levels. The situation in New South Wales and Victoria broadly mirrors the previous status quo at the federal level with both parties in coalition, while in Western Australia the parties are independent of each other. In the Northern Territory the territorial parties merged in 1974 to form the Country Liberal Party (CLP), and in 2008 the Queensland state-level parties merged, forming the Liberal National Party of Queensland (LNP). LNP and CLP members elected to federal parliament do not form separate parliamentary parties. CLP members may choose to sit in either the Liberal or National party rooms, while an LNP member must sit in the party room associated with their seat. In South Australia, Tasmania and the Australian Capital Territory, the Nationals have no sitting MPs and little or no organisational presence.

== History ==
=== Nationalist–Country Coalition ===
==== 1923–1929 ====
The origins of the Coalition date back to the 1922 federal election, when the Nationalist Party, the main middle-class non-Labor party of the time, lost the absolute majority it had held since its formation in 1917. The Nationalists could only stay in office with the support of the two-year-old Country Party. It soon became apparent that a confidence and supply agreement would not be enough to keep the Nationalists in office.

However, Country Party leader Earle Page had never trusted the Nationalist Prime Minister, Billy Hughes. Indeed, the Country Party had been formed in part due to discontent with Hughes' rural policy. Page not only let it be known that he would not serve under Hughes, but demanded Hughes' resignation before he would even consider coalition talks. Hughes resigned, and Page then entered negotiations with the new Nationalist leader, Stanley Bruce. The Country Party's terms were unusually stiff for a prospective junior partner in a Westminster system (and especially so for a relatively new party) – five seats in an 11-member cabinet, as well as the Treasurer's post and second rank in the ministry for Page. Nonetheless, Bruce agreed rather than force a new election. Since then, the leader of the Country Party, which evolved into the National Party, has ranked second in nearly all non-Labor governments.

==== 1929 split ====
The Nationalist–Country Coalition was reelected twice, and continued in office until its defeat in 1929, in which Bruce lost his seat, the first sitting Prime Minister to do so. Unlike many later iterations, the coalition arrangement did not continue into opposition.

=== UAP–Country Coalition ===
==== 1934–1939 ====
The Country Party and the Nationalists' successor party, the United Australia Party, fought the 1931 federal election with a joint Senate ticket, though they ran separate House tickets. The UAP came up only four seats short of a majority in its own right. The Emergency Committee of South Australia, which stood for the UAP and Country Party in South Australia, joined the UAP party room, giving the UAP enough support to rule alone. However, the parties once again joined in a full Coalition government following the 1934 federal election.

==== 1939 split ====
After the death of Prime Minister Joseph Lyons in April 1939, Page was appointed as his successor on an interim basis, pending the new election of a new UAP leader. Despite Page's misgivings, the UAP elected Robert Menzies – who was known to dislike the Country Party. Page subsequently made a vitriolic speech in parliament attacking Menzies's character, and withdrew his party from the coalition – the most recent occasion on which the coalition has been broken while in government.

==== 1940–1943 ====
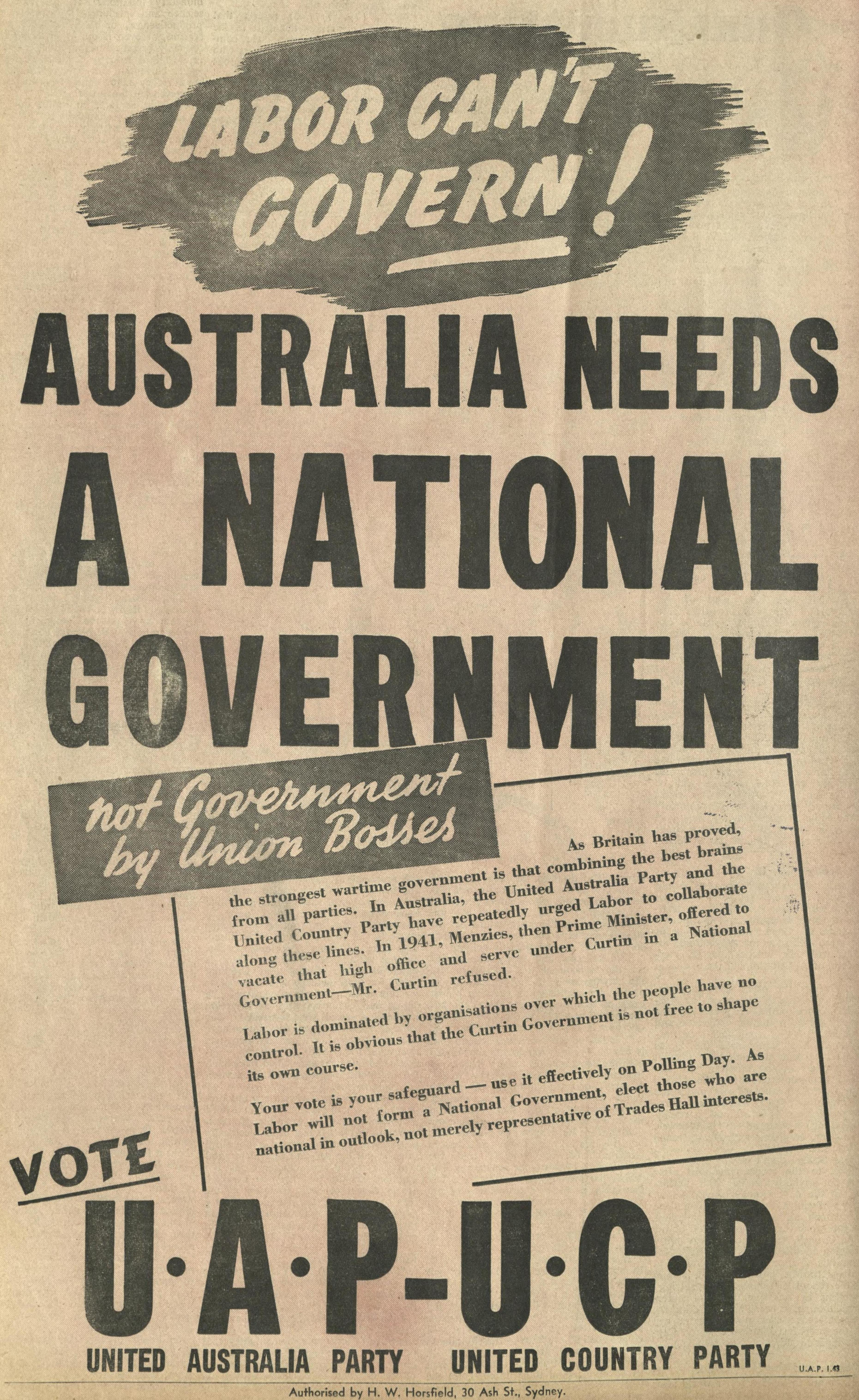
Political advertisement in The Bulletin promoting the Coalition at the 1943 federal election

A number of Page's colleagues in the Country Party disagreed with his stance, and he resigned as leader in September 1939. He was replaced by Archie Cameron, and after months of negotiations the coalition was revived in March 1940, with five Country MPs joining the second Menzies ministry.

After losing eight seats at the 1940 federal election, the Coalition was plunged into minority government for the first time in its history. Archie Cameron was an immediate victim of the election result, being replaced by Arthur Fadden and later defecting to the UAP. Menzies increasingly struggled to balance his management of Australia's war effort with domestic concerns, and his party began to rebel against him. However, the UAP was bereft of leadership despite having been in power for a decade. With this in mind, in August 1941 the Coalition collectively decided that Fadden and Menzies should swap positions, with Menzies becoming Minister for Defence Co-ordination and Fadden becoming prime minister. It was the first and only occasion on which the Coalition was led by the leader of the junior party. However, the Fadden government only lasted a few months before losing a confidence motion and being replaced by the Labor Party in the form of the Curtin government.

After the demise of the Fadden government, the Coalition voted to continue on under his leadership in opposition. Menzies had opposed this, and resigned as UAP leader, to be replaced by the ageing Billy Hughes.

==== 1943 split ====
Up until the 1943 election, the Coalition effectively operated as a single unit, with separate party meetings being extremely rare. However, the landslide defeat it suffered – under Fadden as opposition leader – led to an immediate change in strategy. The UAP voted to break off its ties with the Country Party in opposition, and re-elected Menzies as its leader. This is the most recent occasion in which the senior partner in the Coalition has opted to withdraw.

=== Liberal–Country Coalition ===
==== 1946–1972 ====
The UAP was folded into the Liberal Party in 1945, with Menzies as leader. In the lead-up to the 1946 federal election, Menzies renewed the Coalition with the Country Party, which was still led by Fadden. They won the 1949 federal election as a Coalition, and stayed in office for a record 23 years. This electoral success established a long period of stability in the coalition, during which the post of Deputy Prime Minister was formally created in 1967 to denote Country leader John McEwen's status as the number-two man in the government.

==== 1972 split ====
The parties decided not to form a coalition opposition following their defeat in 1972, but went into the 1974 federal election as a Coalition.

=== Liberal–National Coalition ===
==== 1974–1987 ====
Shortly after the reestablishment of the Coalition, the Country Party was rebadged as the National Country Party in 1975. The solidity of the Coalition was so strong in this period that despite the Liberals winning parliamentary majorities in their own right in the 1975 and 1977 federal elections, the Coalition agreement was retained, and the Coalition remained together upon entering opposition in the 1983 federal election, shortly before which the National Country Party rebadged again to simply the National Party in 1982.

==== 1987 split ====
The Coalition suffered another break, related to the "Joh for Canberra" campaign, from April to August 1987, the rift healing after the 1987 federal election in July.

==== 1987–2025 ====
At the 1996 federal election, the Coalition was retained despite the Liberal Party again winning a parliamentary majority in its own right. This inaugurated the Coalition's second longest period in government under the country's second longest serving Prime Minister, John Howard.

In the 2007 federal election, the Coalition lost to the Labor Party and went into opposition, with Howard becoming both the second Prime Minister and second governing Coalition leader to lose their seat. The Coalition regained office in the 2013 federal election as a majority government. This election was the most recent election (as of 2026) in which the Coalition saw an increase in their first preference vote in the House of Representatives, increasing to 45% from 43% in the previous 2010 federal election.

Under the Coalition in this period, there continued a trend of Prime Ministers contesting only one election before being deposed, which had begun under the Labor Party with Kevin Rudd's replacement with Julia Gillard. The Coalition began to lose support from the 2016 federal election, with its first preference decreased to 42.04%.

In October 2018, the Coalition went into minority government for the second time in its history, when the seat of Wentworth was won by Independent Kerryn Phelps in the by-election. The by-election was triggered by the resignation of incumbent Liberal MP Malcolm Turnbull, who was ousted as Prime Minister and Liberal Party leader during a spill motion earlier in August 2018. The coalition formed majority government again following the 2019 federal election, despite having its first preference vote further reduced to 41.44%. In the lead-up to the 2022 federal election, the Coalition briefly entered minority government for the third time after two members resigned to sit on the crossbench. In the election, the Coalition had its first preference vote reduced to 35.70%, lost to the Labor Party at the election and returned to opposition.

==== 2025 and 2026 splits ====
The Coalition had another loss in the May 2025 federal election, with a first preference vote of 31.70%, the lowest in the Coalition's history. Following the election, Nationals leader David Littleproud announced that the party would split from the Coalition, with policy differences around nuclear power, a future fund for regional Australia and supermarket divestiture powers the main sticking points. Littleproud stated "I gave her [Sussan Ley] the commitment that I'll work with her every day to help to try to rebuild the relationship to the point we can re-enter a coalition before the next election." Nationals deputy leader Kevin Hogan later claimed that this was the decision of the party room rather than the party leadership, and admitted the party room's decision wasn't unanimous. On 23 May, it was reported that the Liberal party room had agreed "in principle" to the Nationals' demands to re-establish a coalition agreement. These included lifting the national moratorium on nuclear energy, divestment powers for supermarkets and hardware retailers, a $20 billion off-budget investment fund for regional Australians and "tougher service obligations for mobile and internet providers". This was seen as leaving open the possibility of a renewed agreement before the resumption of parliament. On 28 May, the parties announced a renewed Coalition agreement, and a new shadow ministry was revealed.

The renewed agreement proved to be the Coalition's shortest lived arrangement. In September, October 2025 and January 2026, the Coalition polled at record lows in Resolve and Newspoll.

On 21 January 2026, Nationals senators Susan McDonald, Bridget McKenzie, and Ross Cadell resigned from the Shadow Ministry for voting against the Coalition's shadow cabinet position concerning hate speech laws, which were drafted by the government in response to the 2025 Bondi Beach shooting. Their resignations were accepted by Ley and following this, the eight remaining National frontbenchers also resigned from the shadow cabinet. The next day Nationals leader David Littleproud confirmed the party had again quit the Coalition, saying "our party room has made it clear that we cannot be part of a shadow ministry under Sussan Ley" and that "we sit by ourselves" in the parliament. The two parties reunified on 8 February 2026. Both parties also agreed that that shadow cabinet decisions could no longer be overturned by either individual party, but instead could only be overturned by a joint Coalition party room. Ley was voted out as leader and replaced with Angus Taylor by the Liberal parliamentary representatives on 12 February 2026, while Littleproud resigned as Nationals leader a month later on 10 March 2026.

== Electoral organisation ==
=== Influence of preferential voting ===
Coalition arrangements were facilitated by Australia's preferential voting systems which enable Liberals and Nationals to compete locally in three-cornered-contests, with the Australian Labor Party (ALP), while exchanging preferences in elections. Such contests would weaken their prospects under first-past-the-post voting. From time to time, friction was caused by the fact that the Liberal and National candidates were campaigning against each other, without long-term damage to the relationship.

Indeed, the whole point of introducing preferential voting was to allow safe spoiler-free, three-cornered contests. It was a government of the Nationalist Party, a forerunner to the modern Liberal Party which introduced the legislation, following Labor's unexpected win at the 1918 Swan by-election where the conservative vote split. Two months later, the Corangamite by-election held under preferential voting caused the initially leading ALP candidate to lose after some lower-placed candidates' preferences had been distributed.

As a result of variations on the preferential voting system used in every state and territory, the Coalition was able to thrive, wherever both its member parties have both been active. The preferential voting system allowed the Liberal and National parties to compete and co-operate at the same time. By contrast, a variation of the preferential system known as optional preferential voting proved a significant handicap to coalition co-operation in Queensland and New South Wales, because significant numbers of voters do not express all useful preferences.

=== Suggestions to merge ===
In March 1973, former Prime Minister William McMahon publicly announced his support for a merger. McMahon reiterated his view after Labor won the 1974 election, and Billy Snedden, his successor as leader of the Liberal Party, also stated that he favoured a merger.

During the 1980s, former Nationals MP Peter Nixon reviewed the party and "concluded it should seriously consider amalgamating with the Liberals". Former Nationals leader Doug Anthony wrote not long afterward, "Any objective and rational National Party member who read this report would have to accept that amalgamation was the only realistic course. Regrettably, there are still too many who don't want to read it and who don't want to face reality, that the role of a specialist party looking after the needs of rural people is in decline." Nationals leader Ian Sinclair publicly rejected calls for a merger, citing the incompatibility of the National Party's conservatism and the "small-l liberal" wing of the Liberal Party.

In July 1989, Senator Fred Chaney, the deputy leader of the Liberal Party, stated his tentative support for a merger, but noted that it could not be led by politicians and should come from the grassroots.

In the wake of their 2007 federal election loss, there was again talk of a merger in 2007 and 2008, as a result of a shrinking National Party vote. It was argued that the decline in the National vote is linked to a declining rural population, and National Party policies have become increasingly similar to those of the Liberal Party. However, no merger took place outside of Queensland. In the federal parliament, members of the resulting Liberal National Party sat with either the Liberals or the Nationals.

== Nomenclature ==
During the two coalitions of the United Australia Party and the Country Party between 1934 and 1943, the combined parties were often referred to as the United Australia Party – United Country Party, or UAP-UCP, including in official campaign material, despite the Country Party never officially including 'United' in its name.

A coalition between the Liberal and National Parties and their predecessors contested all but 3 federal elections between the 1925 and 2025 elections and often persisted in opposition, making the arrangement a fixture of Australian politics despite lacking any official organisation beyond the agreements between the two parties. As a result, most commentators and the general public often referred to it as 'the Coalition' with the definitive article and without qualification, and often as if it were a single party. Polling and electoral results contained a two-party-preferred (TPP) vote which was based on Labor and the Coalition. The Australian Electoral Commission has distinguished between "traditional" (Coalition/Labor) two-party-preferred (TPP/2PP) contests, and "non-traditional" (for example, Independent, Greens, Liberal vs National) two-candidate-preferred (TCP/2CP) contests. At the 2010 federal election, all eight seats which resulted in a two-candidate-preferred result were re-counted to also express a statistical-only "traditional" two-party-preferred result.

== Electorate ==
As of 2022, the biggest voting blocs of the Coalition were men, the middle class (as opposed to the working class), who make between A$45,001–A$80,000 per year, and have a non-tertiary qualification or no educational qualification. Homeowners voted more for the Coalition than any other party, and the State of Queensland was its biggest electorate by two-party-preferred vote percentage (though by primary vote, Tasmania was the state with the highest Coalition vote).

The Coalition also gathered significant support from Australians in regional, rural and remote areas, whilst lacking significant support in most parts of the capital cities. However, there were regions of capital cities that do still vote for the Coalition; such as the Hills District and Sutherland and historically most of the Eastern Suburbs and Northern Suburbs of Sydney; some areas of Melbourne's east and northeast; many areas of Brisbane and Perth; and the southern part of Darwin.

The Coalition had below-average support among Indian and Muslim voters. Historically, Chinese Australians voted for the Coalition over Labor, due to a perception that Liberal Party was more business-oriented than Labor. However, this had declined in the last years of the Coalition. In the 2022 Australian federal election, electorates with a higher concentration of Chinese-Australian voters experienced larger swings against the Coalition compared to other electorates; in the top 15 seats by Chinese ancestry, the swing against the Coalition on a two-party-preferred basis was 6.6 per cent, compared to 3.7 per cent in other seats. This resulted in the Liberal Party losing many federal seats with large Chinese communities in 2022 to Labor (losing Bennelong and Reid in Sydney and Chisholm in Melbourne to Labor and Kooyong in Melbourne to a teal independent), as well as losing Aston in 2023, which was the first time in over a century in which the government won a seat off the opposition in a by-election. In the 2023 New South Wales state election, the top 10 electorates in terms of Chinese ancestry all saw big swings to Labor. However, the New South Wales division of the Liberal Party managed to hold many state seats with large Chinese communities (such as the Sydney seats of Drummoyne, Epping, Holsworthy, Lane Cove, Miranda, Oatley and Ryde).

== Policies ==
In the 2025 Australian federal election campaign, housing affordability and its link to immigration were central points of contention between the Coalition leader Peter Dutton and Prime Minister Anthony Albanese. In 2025, the Coalition has pledged to reduce the annual permanent migration intake from the current level of 180,000 to 140,000.

The then-leader of the Coalition, Sussan Ley, delayed the release of the Coalition's new migration policy (originally expected before the end of 2025) following the Bondi Beach terrorist attack in December 2025. She cited concerns about fraying social cohesion and the risk that a fresh debate on migration levels would be inflammatory during an extremely sensitive time. Instead of pursuing the migration debate, Ley shifted the Coalition's focus to national security and counter-terrorism, calling for the immediate formation of an antisemitism and counter-terrorism taskforce.

== Chronology ==
Elections where member parties subsequently formed government in coalition are shown in bold. Elections where a member party subsequently governed outside of coalition are shown in italics.

Period	Alliance	Member parties		Federal elections
1923–1931	**Nationalist–Country Coalition**	Nationalist	NAT	**1925**; **1928**; 1929
1923–1931	**Nationalist–Country Coalition**	Country	CP	**1925**; **1928**; 1929
1931–1934	None			1931 (Note: In 1931 the two parties ran a joint ticket in the Senate but did not govern in a Coalition.); **1934** (Note: In 1934 and 1987 the two parties contested the election separately and not as the Coalition.)
1934–1939	**United Australia–Country Coalition** (Note: The coalition agreement between the United Australia and Country parties was often mentioned as the United Australia–United Country (UAP–UCP) coalition.)	United Australia	UAP	**1937**
1934–1939	**United Australia–Country Coalition**	Country	CP	**1937**
1939–1940	None			N/A
1940–1943	**United Australia–Country Coalition**	United Australia	UAP	**1940**; 1943
1940–1943	**United Australia–Country Coalition**	Country	CP	**1940**; 1943
1943–1946	None			N/A
1946–1972	**Liberal–Country Coalition**	Liberal	LP	1946; **1949**; **1951**; **1954**; **1955**; **1958**; **1961**; **1963**; **1966**; **1969**; 1972
1946–1972	**Liberal–Country Coalition**	Country	CP	1946; **1949**; **1951**; **1954**; **1955**; **1958**; **1961**; **1963**; **1966**; **1969**; 1972
1972–1974	None			N/A
1974–1987	**Liberal–National Coalition**	Liberal	LP	1974; **1975**; **1977**; **1980**; 1983; 1984
1974–1987	**Liberal–National Coalition**	National (Note: At federal level, known as the Australian Country Party until 1975, then as the National Country Party until 1982.)	NP	1974; **1975**; **1977**; **1980**; 1983; 1984
1987	None			1987
1987–2025	**Liberal–National Coalition**	Liberal	LP	1990; 1993; **1996**; **1998**; **2001**; **2004**; 2007; 2010; **2013**; **2016**; **2019**; 2022; 2025
1987–2025	**Liberal–National Coalition**	National	NP	1990; 1993; **1996**; **1998**; **2001**; **2004**; 2007; 2010; **2013**; **2016**; **2019**; 2022; 2025
2025	None			N/A
2025–2026	**Liberal–National Coalition**	Liberal	LP	N/A
2025–2026	**Liberal–National Coalition**	National	NP	N/A
2026	None			N/A
2026–present	**Liberal–National Coalition**	Liberal	LP	N/A
2026–present	**Liberal–National Coalition**	National	NP	N/A

== Federal election results ==
=== House of Representatives ===
Election	Leader		Deputy Leader		Votes	%	Seats	±	Status
1925	Stanley Bruce	Nationalist	Earle Page	Country	1,551,760	53.20	51 / 75	▲11	Majority
1928	Stanley Bruce	Nationalist	Earle Page	Country	1,286,208	49.56	42 / 75	▼9	Majority
1929	Stanley Bruce	Nationalist	Earle Page	Country	1,271,619	44.17	24 / 75	▼18	Opposition
1931	Joseph Lyons	UAP	(Note: This includes the 5 elected candidates of the Emergency Committee (which stood for the UAP and the Country party in South Australia), who joined the UAP party room following the election.)		1,330,097	41.91	38 / 75	▲24	Majority
1931	Earle Page	Country	(Note: This includes the 5 elected candidates of the Emergency Committee (which stood for the UAP and the Country party in South Australia), who joined the UAP party room following the election.)		388,544	12.24	16 / 75	▲6	Crossbench
1934	Joseph Lyons	UAP	(Note: 2 months following the election, the UAP and Country parties agreed to govern in coalition.)		1,313,561	36.99	33 / 74	▼5	Majority
1934	Earle Page	Country	(Note: 2 months following the election, the UAP and Country parties agreed to govern in coalition.)		447,968	12.61	14 / 74	▼2	Majority
1937	Joseph Lyons	UAP	Earle Page	Country	1,774,805	49.26	44 / 74	▲2	Majority
1940	Robert Menzies	UAP	Archie Cameron	Country	1,703,185	43.93	36 / 74	▼8	Minority (1940–41)
1940	Robert Menzies	UAP	Archie Cameron	Country	1,703,185	43.93	36 / 74	▼8	Opposition (1941–43)
1943	Arthur Fadden	Country	Billy Hughes	UAP	1,248,506	30.45	23 / 74	▼13	Opposition
1946	Robert Menzies	Liberal	Arthur Fadden	Country	1,706,387	39.28	26 / 76	▲7	Opposition
1949	Robert Menzies	Liberal	Arthur Fadden	Country	2,314,143	50.26	74 / 121	▲48	Majority
1951	Robert Menzies	Liberal	Arthur Fadden	Country	2,298,512	50.34	69 / 121	▼5	Majority
1954	Robert Menzies	Liberal	Arthur Fadden	Country	2,133,979	46.82	64 / 121	▼5	Majority
1955	Robert Menzies	Liberal	Arthur Fadden	Country	2,093,930	47.63	75 / 122	▲11	Majority
1958	Robert Menzies	Liberal	John McEwen	Country	2,324,500	46.55	77 / 122	▲2	Majority
1961	Robert Menzies	Liberal	John McEwen	Country	2,208,213	42.09	62 / 122	▼15	Majority
1963	Robert Menzies	Liberal	John McEwen	Country	2,520,321	46.03	72 / 122	▲10	Majority
1966	Harold Holt	Liberal	John McEwen	Country	2,853,890	49.98	82 / 124	▲10	Majority
1969	John Gorton	Liberal	John McEwen	Country	2,649,219	43.33	66 / 125	▼16	Majority
1972	William McMahon	Liberal	Doug Anthony	Country	2,737,911	41.48	58 / 125	▼8	Opposition
1974	Billy Snedden	Liberal	Doug Anthony	Country	3,319,220	44.91	61 / 127	▲3	Opposition (Note: Following the 1975 Australian constitutional crisis, the then Coalition leader Malcolm Fraser was appointed caretaker prime minister prior to the following election.)
1975	Malcolm Fraser	Liberal	Doug Anthony	National Country	4,102,078	53.05	91 / 127	▲30	Majority
1977	Malcolm Fraser	Liberal	Doug Anthony	National Country	3,811,340	48.10	86 / 124	▼5	Majority
1980	Malcolm Fraser	Liberal	Doug Anthony	National Country	3,853,549	46.40	74 / 125	▼12	Majority
1983	Malcolm Fraser	Liberal	Doug Anthony	National	3,783,595	43.57	50 / 125	▼24	Opposition
1984	Andrew Peacock	Liberal	Ian Sinclair	National	3,872,707	44.69	66 / 148	▲16	Opposition
1987	John Howard	Liberal	(Note: Following the election, the coalition was reformed and sat together in opposition.)		3,169,061	34.32	43 / 148	▼2	Opposition
1987	Ian Sinclair	National	(Note: Following the election, the coalition was reformed and sat together in opposition.)		1,048,249	11.35	19 / 148	▼2	Opposition
1990	Andrew Peacock	Liberal	Charles Blunt	National	4,302,127	43.46	69 / 148	▲7	Opposition
1993	John Hewson	Liberal	Tim Fischer	National	4,681,822	44.27	65 / 147	▼4	Opposition
1996	John Howard	Liberal	Tim Fischer	National	5,103,859	46.90	94 / 148	▲29	Majority
1998	John Howard	Liberal	Tim Fischer	National	4,352,795	39.18	80 / 148	▼14	Majority
2001	John Howard	Liberal	John Anderson	National	4,887,998	43.01	82 / 150	▲2	Majority
2004	John Howard	Liberal	John Anderson	National	5,471,588	46.70	87 / 150	▲5	Majority
2007	John Howard	Liberal	Mark Vaile	National	5,229,024	42.09	65 / 150	▼22	Opposition
2010	Tony Abbott	Liberal	Warren Truss	National	5,365,529	43.32	72 / 150	▲7	Opposition
2013	Tony Abbott	Liberal	Warren Truss	National	5,882,818	45.55	90 / 150	▲18	Majority
2016	Malcolm Turnbull	Liberal	Barnaby Joyce	National	5,693,605	42.15	76 / 150	▼14	Majority
2019	Scott Morrison	Liberal	Michael McCormack	National	5,906,860	41.44	77 / 151	▲1	Majority
2022	Scott Morrison	Liberal	Barnaby Joyce	National	5,233,334	35.70	58 / 151	▼19	Opposition
2025	Peter Dutton	Liberal	David Littleproud	National	4,929,606	31.82	43 / 150	▼15	Opposition

== States and territories ==
Coalition state and territory seats (and endorsed parties)
- NSW Parliament: NSW Assembly 35 / 93 24 / 93 24 LP 11 / 93 11 NP; NSW Council 14 / 42 9 / 42 9 LP 5 / 42 5 NP
- Vic Parliament: Vic Assembly 29 / 88 20 / 88 20 LP 9 / 88 9 NP; Vic Council 14 / 40 12 / 40 12 LP 2 / 40 2 NP
- QLD Parliament: 52 / 93
- WA Parliament: WA Assembly 7 / 59 6 / 59 WA Council 10 / 37 2 / 37
- SA Parliament: SA House 13 / 47 SA Council 8 / 22
- Tas Parliament: Tas House 14 / 35 Tas Council 4 / 15
- ACT Assembly: 9 / 25
- NT Parliament: 17 / 25

=== New South Wales ===
A Coalition between the Liberal (and predecessors) and National parties has existed without interruption in New South Wales since 1927. Predecessors of the NSW Liberal Party, including the UAP, Nationalist Party and the Democratic Party, maintained a coalition with the Country Party (old name of National Party).

The Liberal Party is led by Kellie Sloane and the National Party by Dugald Saunders. The Coalition won the 2011 state election in a massive swing under Barry O'Farrell, the 2015 election with a reduced majority under Mike Baird, and the 2019 election under Gladys Berejiklian. The Coalition led by Dominic Perrottet lost the 2023 state election and is in opposition since.

New South Wales is the only state where the non-Labor Coalition has never broken, and yet has also never merged. This remained the case even in 2011, when the Liberals won a majority in their own right but still retained the Coalition. On 10 September 2020, the Nationals threatened to move to the crossbench over a dispute regarding koala protection laws, but the issue was resolved the next day and the Nationals remained in the Coalition.

=== Queensland ===
Due to Brisbane having a much smaller share of Queensland's population compared to the other state capitals, Queensland is the only state in which the Nationals have ever consistently been the stronger non-Labor party. The Nationals were the senior partner in the non-Labor Coalition from 1925 until the Coalition was broken in 1983. At an election held two months later, the Nationals under Joh Bjelke-Petersen came up one seat short of a majority, but later gained a majority when two Liberal MLAs crossed the floor to join the Nationals. The Nationals then governed in their own right until 1989. The Coalition was renewed in 1991, and won power under Rob Borbidge from 1996 to 1998.

The Queensland Liberals and Nationals had contested separately for the Senate in federal elections until the 2007 election, when they ran a join Senate ticket for the first time in 30 years. In 2008, the two parties agreed to merge, forming the Liberal National Party (LNP), under the leadership of former National Lawrence Springborg. Although it is dominated by former Nationals, it has full voting rights within the Liberal Party and observer status within the National Party. Springborg stood down in 2009, and was succeeded by former Liberal John-Paul Langbroek. The LNP won an overwhelming majority government in the 2012 state election under the leadership of former Liberal Campbell Newman, who had taken over from Langbroek a year earlier. However, it lost power in 2015 and remained in opposition for nearly a decade, before returning to power in 2024 under the leadership of David Crisafulli.

At the federal level, 15 LNP MPs sit with the Liberals and six sit with the Nationals, including federal Nationals leader David Littleproud. LNP Senators Matt Canavan and Susan McDonald sit with the Nationals, while the LNP's four other senators sit with the Liberals. The highest-profile LNP MP of the 2010s was former federal Nationals leader and Deputy Prime Minister Warren Truss. The LNP has an informal agreement with its federal counterparts as to which party room in which LNP members will sit. Incumbent MPs retain their previous federal affiliations, whereas members who win seats from the ALP that previously belonged to the Coalition will sit with the previous member's party. An amicable division of seats was decided upon for new seats or seats that have never been won by the Coalition. In practice, all LNP MPs from Brisbane and most LNP MPs from the Gold Coast and the Sunshine Coast sit with the Liberals, while those from rural seats usually sit with the Nationals.

=== South Australia ===
The state branch of the Country Party merged with the Liberal Federation, the state branch of the UAP, in 1932 to form the Liberal and Country League. It later became the state division of the Liberal Party when the latter was formed in 1945. A separate Country Party (later Nationals SA) was revived in 1963, though the main non-Labor party in South Australia continued to use the LCL name until it was also renamed to the Liberal Party in 1974. The revived SA Nationals have never been successful in South Australia, due to the state's highly centralised population (some three-quarters of the population lives in Adelaide) and the Liberals' strong support in rural areas that would tilt National in most of the rest of Australia. The party's current incarnation has only elected two representatives: Peter Blacker from 1973 to 1993, and Karlene Maywald from 1997 to 2010.

From 2004 to 2010, Maywald was a Minister in the Rann Labor government, before losing her seat at the 2010 South Australian state election, thereby informally creating a Labor–National coalition in South Australia. The National Party, at the time, rejected the notion that it was in a coalition with Labor at the state level. State National Party President John Venus told journalists, "We (The Nationals) are not in coalition with the Labor Party, we aren't in coalition with the Liberals, we are definitely not in coalition with anyone. We stand alone in South Australia as an independent party." Flinders University political scientist Haydon Manning disagreed, saying that it is "churlish to describe the government as anything but a coalition". The party did not run candidates at the 2010 federal election, but ran one candidate in the seat of Barker and two for the Senate at the 2013 election. The Nationals candidate for Barker and several other Coalition figures assured electors that any Nationals elected from South Australia would be part of the Coalition, after comments from the Liberal candidate to the contrary.

=== Tasmania ===
The National Party has never done well in Tasmania, even though its first leader, William McWilliams, was a Tasmanian. It has elected only two other lower house members. A Tasmania branch of the then-Country Party was formed in 1922 and briefly held the balance of power, but merged with the Nationalists in 1924. It was refounded in 1962, but never gained much ground. In 1969, Liberal MHA Kevin Lyons, the son of former Prime Minister Lyons, pulled together most of the Tasmanian Country Party into the Centre Party, which held the balance of power in that year's state election. It threw its support to the Liberals, and Lyons – the Centre Party's lone MHA – became Deputy Premier. The Liberal–Centre alliance fell apart in 1972, forcing an early election. In 1975, what remained of the Centre Party became the Tasmanian chapter of what was by now the National Country Party before fading away completely. A Tasmanian National Party branch was briefly revived in the 1990s before it too disappeared, leaving the Liberal Party as the sole major non-Labor party in the state. In 2018, Senator Steve Martin, formerly of the Jacqui Lambie Network, joined the Nationals, becoming the party's first federal member from Tasmania in either chamber in 90 years. However, Martin lost his bid for a new term.

=== Victoria ===
A Coalition between the Liberal and National parties exists in Victoria. The Liberal Party is led by Jess Wilson and the National Party by Danny O'Brien.

The Country Party was the stronger coalition partner on multiple occasions from the 1920s through to the 1950s, and Country leaders served as Premier of Victoria on five occasions. However, the relationship between the two parties was somewhat strained for most of the second half of the 20th century. In 1948, the coalition was broken when the Liberal leader and Premier Thomas Hollway sacked Country leader John McDonald as Deputy Premier. In March 1949, the Liberals renamed themselves the Liberal and Country Party as part of an effort to merge the two non-Labor parties in Victoria. However, McDonald saw this as an attempted Liberal takeover of the Country Party, and the Country Party turned the proposed merger down. As a result, both parties competed against each other and fought elections separately from 1952 to 1989. The presence of John McEwen, a Victorian, as number-two man in the federal government from 1958 to 1971 (including a brief stint as interim Prime Minister) did little to change this.

The Liberals and Nationals reached a Coalition agreement in 1990. They fought and won the 1992 and 1996 elections as a Coalition under the leadership of Jeff Kennett. Although the Liberals won enough seats to govern alone, Kennett retained the Nationals in his government. When Peter Ryan became leader of the Nationals shortly after the Kennett government's 1999 election defeat, he terminated the Coalition agreement and led the Nationals into the 2002 and 2006 elections separately from the Liberals. However, the Coalition agreement was renewed in 2008 and the Victorian Liberal and National parties went into the 2010 election as a Coalition. The Coalition ended up winning the 2010 election with a one-seat margin under the leadership of Ted Baillieu, who resigned in 2013 and was succeeded by Denis Napthine. The Coalition lost power at the 2014 election. The Coalition arrangement has been maintained while the two parties are in opposition.

According to The Age, between November 2018 and November 2021, the Coalition's Legislative Council members voted with the Andrews Government's position 28.9% of the time; of the parties in the Legislative Council, only the Liberal Democratic Party had a lower figure (22.1%).

=== Western Australia ===
The Country Party was the stronger coalition partner from the 1933 state election to the 1947 state election, although the Coalition did not form government during this period. Western Australia has never had a premier from the Country/National Party.

In May 1949, the Liberal and Country League was formed to attempt to merge Country Party (then called County Democratic League or CDL) and Liberal Party together. This did not eventuate and the CDL did not join the new party.

The National Party was in Coalition with the Liberal Party government from 1993 to 2001 (see Hendy Cowan), but the Coalition was subsequently broken. In 2008, the Liberals under Colin Barnett, the Nationals under Brendon Grylls, and independent John Bowler formed a minority government after the 2008 election. However, it was not characterised as a "traditional coalition", with limited cabinet collective responsibility for National cabinet members. Tony Crook was elected as the WA Nationals candidate for the seat of O'Connor at the 2010 federal election. Although some reports initially counted Crook as a National MP, and thus part of the Coalition, Crook sat as a crossbencher.

The Liberals won enough seats for a majority in their own right in the 2013 state election, but Barnett had announced before the election that he would retain the coalition with the Nationals. However, Barnett would have likely had to keep the Nationals in his government in any event. According to the ABC's Antony Green, the rural weighting in the Legislative Council all but forces the WA Liberals to depend on National support even when the Liberals have enough support to govern alone. The Barnett government was heavily defeated at the 2017 state election, and the two parties went their separate ways with Liberal Party being the sole opposition party.

In the 2021 election, the Liberal Party ended up winning fewer seats than the National Party, headed by Mia Davies, with the National Party gaining opposition status and Davies becoming the first Nationals opposition leader since 1947. Following the election, the Liberal Party and Nationals Party entered into a formal alliance to form opposition, with National Party being the senior party and the Liberal Party being the junior party in the alliance. Shadow ministerial positions were also held by parliamentary members of both parties. This was similar to the agreements between both parties when they were in government following the 2008 and 2013 elections. Similar to the 2008 and 2013 agreements, the deputy leader of the senior party, Nationals deputy leader Shane Love, was the deputy opposition leader, instead of the leader of the junior party, Liberal Party leader David Honey. Under the alliance, each party maintained their independence, and could speak out on issues when there was a disagreement with their partner.

=== Northern Territory ===
The two parties' branches in the Northern Territory merged in 1974, forming the Country Liberal Party. The CLP governed the Territory from 1974 to 2001 and from 2012 to 2016. The CLP retains full voting rights within the federal National Party, and has observer status with the federal Liberal Party. The CLP directs its federal members of the House and Senate whether to sit with the federal Liberals or Nationals. During the Joh for Canberra campaign, there was an independent Northern Territory National Party which competed independent from it. In practice, since the mid-1980s, CLP House members have sat with the Liberals while CLP Senators sit with the Nationals. For example, Natasha Griggs sat with the Liberals when she held the Darwin-area seat of Solomon from 2010 to 2016. CLP Senator Nigel Scullion was the leader of the Nationals in the Senate from 2007 to 2008, when he was succeeded by Barnaby Joyce. He was the federal deputy leader of the Nationals, alongside Truss, from 2007 to 2013. Joyce became federal Nationals deputy leader after his successful transition to the House of Representatives at the 2013 election, and Scullion returned as the Nationals Senate leader.

=== Australian Capital Territory ===
The National Party is not affiliated in the Australian Capital Territory, leaving the Liberal Party as the sole major non-Labor party in the territory.

== See also ==
- Democratic Labor Party (1950s–1970s) (Note: The Democratic Labor Party (DLP) directed its voters' second preferences to the Australian Coalition (Liberal and National Parties), significantly helping them win elections, especially from the 1950s to the 1970s, by keeping the Labor Party out.)
- Pauline Hanson's One Nation
- Two-party system
- Uniparty
- Tasmanian Labor–Green Accord (1989–1990)
- Australian Capital Territory Labor–Greens coalition (2012–2024)
