= 1941 United Australia Party leadership election =

← 1939	9 October 1941	1943 →
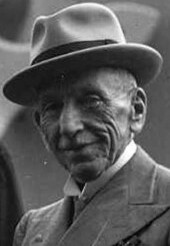

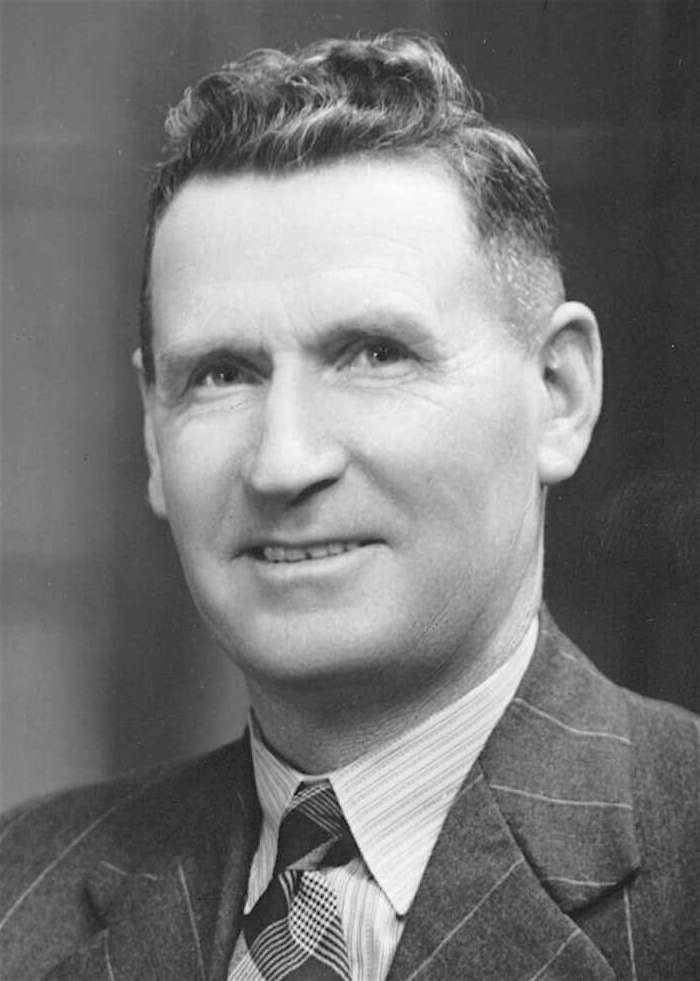

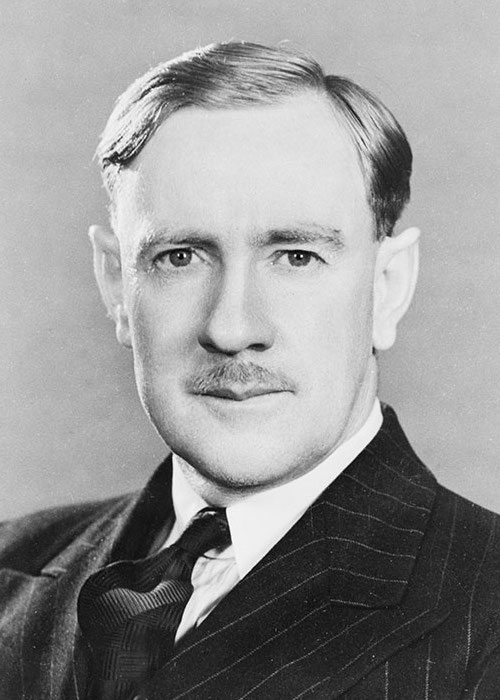
Candidate	Billy Hughes	Allan McDonald	Percy Spender
First Ballot	Uncertain	Uncertain	Uncertain
Second Ballot	16?	15?	Eliminated
Seat	North Sydney (NSW)	Corangamite (VIC)	Warringah (NSW)
Leader before election
Robert Menzies
Elected Leader
Billy Hughes

The United Australia Party (UAP) held a leadership election on 9 October 1941, following the resignation of Robert Menzies on the same day. Billy Hughes was elected as his replacement.

Menzies had become UAP leader (and thus prime minister) in 1939, following the death of Joseph Lyons. The UAP-Country Coalition lost its slender majority at the 1940 election, and depended on the votes of two independents to stay in office.

On 29 August 1941, Menzies resigned the prime ministership after Labor turned down his offer to join a national unity government. He was succeeded by Country Party leader Arthur Fadden, who had been elected by a joint meeting of the Coalition parties. However, the Fadden government lasted only 40 days before being defeated after the two independents joined Labor in defeating Fadden's budget. John Curtin's Labor Party formed a new government on 7 October, with the Coalition parties forced into opposition.

On 9 October, Menzies called a meeting of the parliamentary UAP. He resigned the party's leadership, but not before calling for a vote to determine whether the UAP should form a joint opposition with the Country Party (with Fadden as opposition leader). After a long debate, a joint opposition was approved by 19 votes to 12, despite Menzies arguing against the proposal. As a result, he did not re-contest the party leadership. There were three candidates – former prime minister and attorney-general Billy Hughes, former army minister Percy Spender, and former external territories minister Allan McDonald. Spender was eliminated on the first ballot, and Hughes narrowly defeated McDonald on the second. The final tally of votes was not released, but some sources reported the margin to be only a single vote. Hughes, who was 79 years old (although claiming to be 77), was viewed as "a stop-gap choice to give time for animosities to cool or a more formidable rival to Menzies to emerge".

== Results ==
1941 United Australia Party leadership election
Party	Candidate	Votes	%	±%
United Australia	Billy Hughes	?		
United Australia	Allan McDonald	?		
United Australia	Percy Spender	?		
Second ballot result
United Australia	Billy Hughes	16?		
United Australia	Allan McDonald	15?		

== See also ==
- Fadden government
- 1943 Australian federal election
