= 1939 Country Party of Australia leadership election =

← 1921	13 September 1939	1940 →
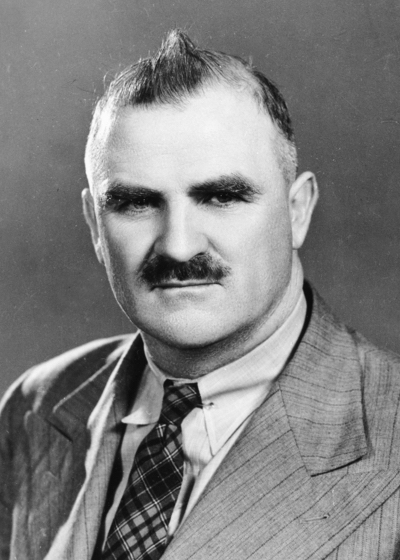

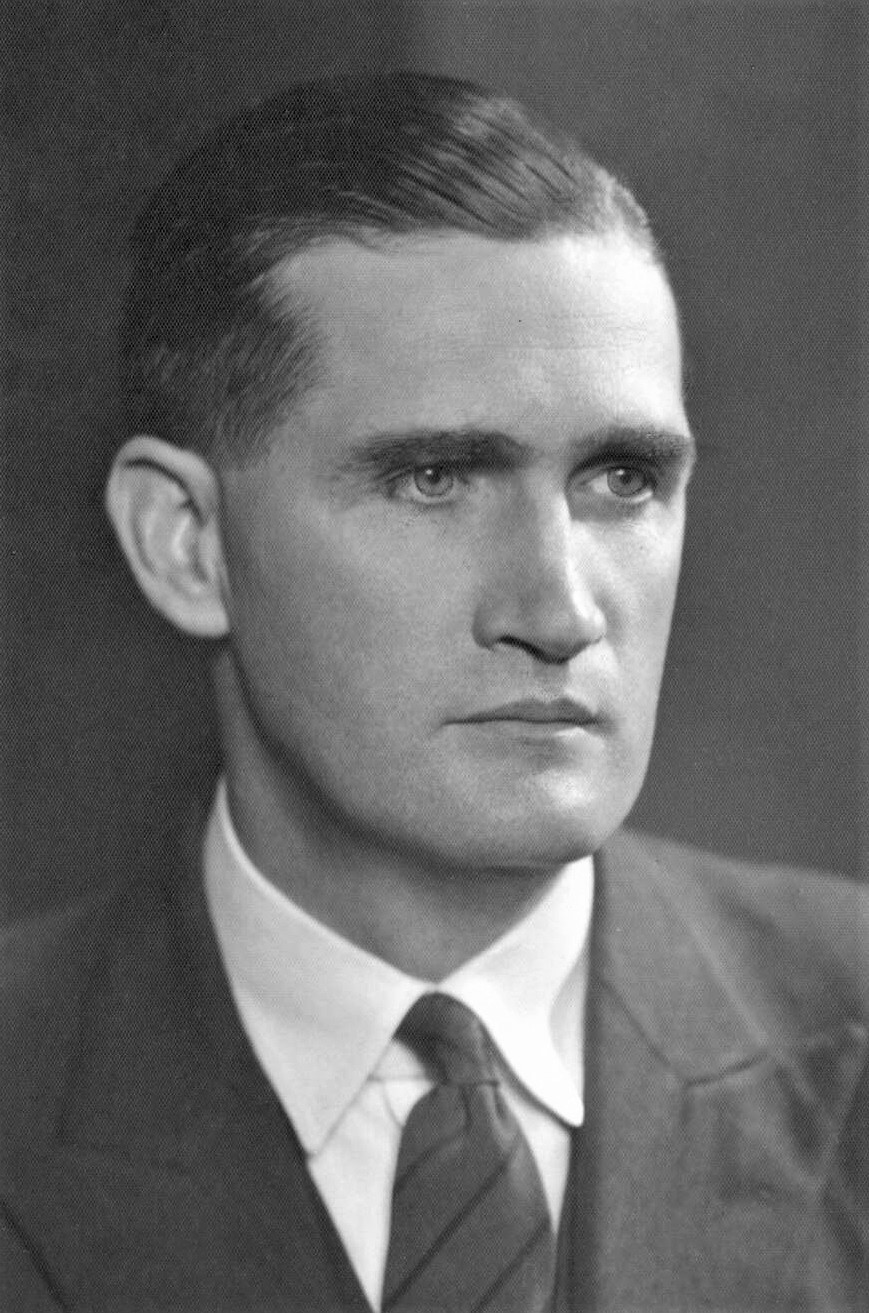
Candidate	Archie Cameron	John McEwen
Caucus vote	7	5
Percentage	58.33%	41.66%
Seat	Barker (SA)	Indi (VIC)
Leader before election
Earle Page
Elected Leader
Archie Cameron

A leadership election was held on 13 September 1939 to select Earle Page's replacement as leader of the Country Party of Australia and de facto-Deputy Prime Minister. Archie Cameron was elected party leader in preference to John McEwen seven votes to five.

== Background ==
When Joseph Lyons died in office in April 1939, Country Party leader Earl Page was commissioned as caretaker Prime Minister capacity while the United Australia Party (UAP) could elect a new leader. When Robert Menzies was elected as the new UAP leader, Page refused to work under him, and made an extraordinary personal attack on him in the House, accusing him of ministerial incompetence and cowardice for refusing to enlist during World War I. Subsequently, Page refused to serve in Menzies' cabinet and withdrew the Country Party from the coalition. However, this proved unpopular and his party soon rebelled and caused him to resign as party leader. This left the field open for a new leader.

== Candidates ==
- Archie Cameron, Member for Barker (SA) and Postmaster-General
- John McEwen, Member for Indi (Vic) and Minister for the Interior

== Results ==
The following table gives the ballot results:

Name	Votes	Percentage
Archie Cameron	7	58.33
John McEwen	5	41.66

== Aftermath ==
According to McEwen, the result had been skewed due to the absence of four Country Party MPs who had refused to sit in the party room whilst Page was leader. A motion to re-admit them as members was defeated by seven votes to six. McEwen later claimed in his memoirs that the dissentient MPs were "all strong supporters of mine and, had they been allowed to vote, I would have won the election". All were subsequently re-admitted to the party several months later.

== See also ==
- 1939 United Australia Party leadership election
- National Party of Australia leadership elections
