= 1943 United Australia Party leadership election =

United Australia Party leadership election, 1943
- 22 September 1943
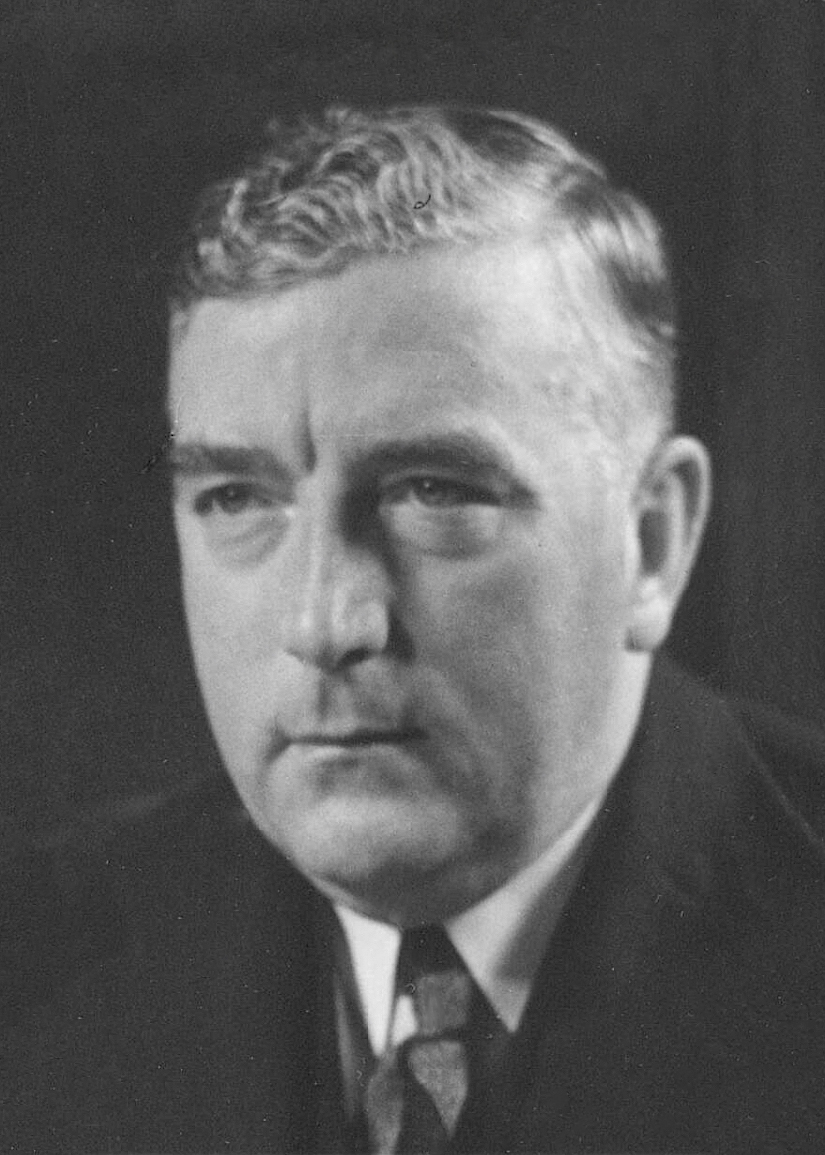

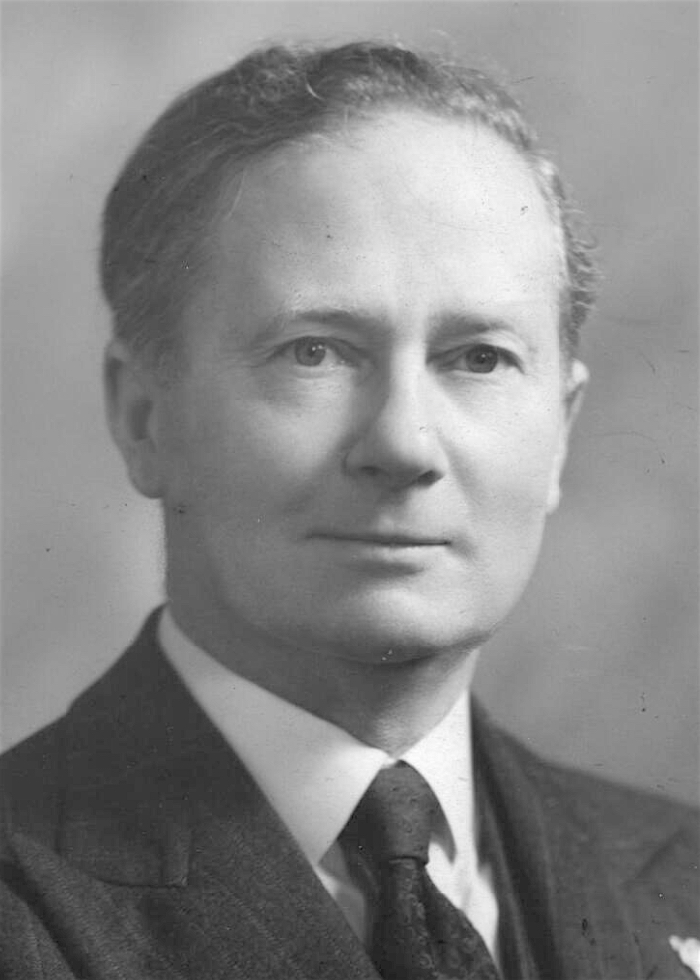

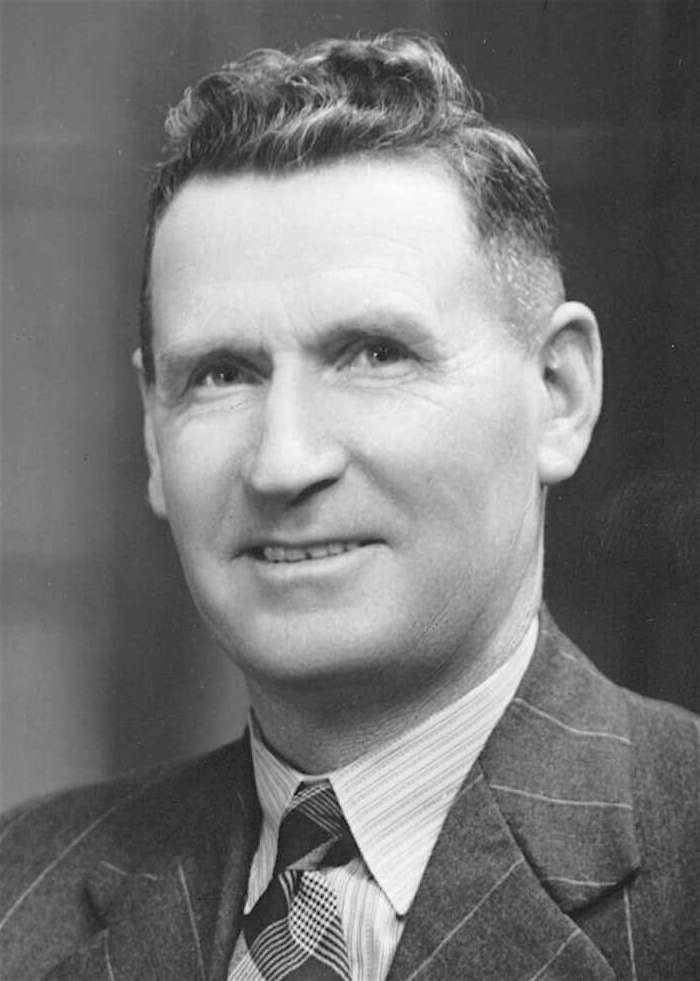

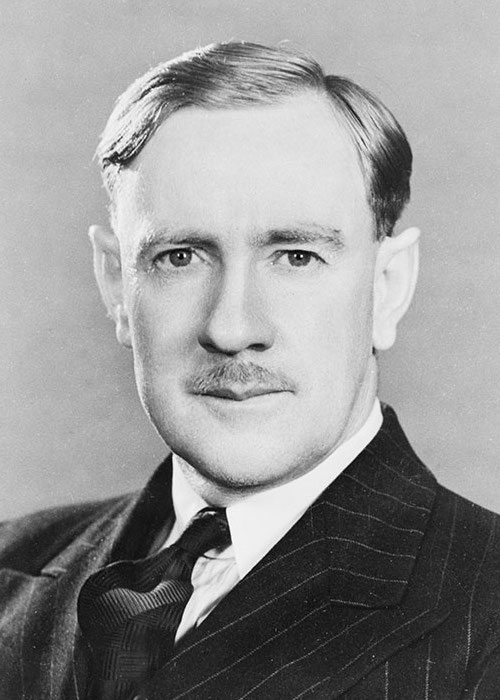
Candidate	Robert Menzies	Thomas White
First Ballot	13?	Uncertain
Second Ballot	14?	7?
Seat	Kooyong (VIC)	Balaclava (VIC)
Candidate	Allan McDonald	Percy Spender
First Ballot	Uncertain	Uncertain
Second Ballot	5?	Eliminated
Seat	Corangamite (VIC)	Warringah (NSW)
Leader before election
Billy Hughes
Elected Leader
Robert Menzies

The United Australia Party (UAP) held a leadership election on 22 September 1943, following the resignation of Billy Hughes. Robert Menzies, the party's leader from 1939 to 1941, was elected as his replacement, defeating three other candidates – Thomas White, Allan McDonald, and Percy Spender.

== Background ==
Hughes had been elected party leader in 1941, following the defeat of the Coalition government led by Arthur Fadden, the leader of the Country Party. The UAP simultaneously voted to form a "joint opposition" with the Country Party, under Fadden as Leader of the Opposition. Hughes, who had his 80th birthday in 1942, was viewed as a figurehead more than anything else, and the party virtually ceased to exist as a separate entity under his leadership; at one point there were no partyroom meetings for more than a year. At a meeting on 25 March 1943, a spill motion was put forward and defeated 24–15; it had been expected that the vote would be much closer. The following month, Menzies and his supporters formed a ginger group within the UAP, known as the National Service Group, to push for "new and vigorous leadership". They would remain in the party, but no longer attend its meetings, only those of the joint opposition. Hughes denounced them as "a reactionary clique".

== Election and aftermath ==
A federal election took place on 21 August 1943, at which the Coalition was defeated in a landslide. Hughes announced his resignation on 22 September, and four candidates stood as his replacement – Menzies, Thomas White, Allan McDonald, and Percy Spender. Spender was eliminated on the first ballot, where Menzies reportedly failed to secure a majority by only a single vote. He won an absolute majority on the second ballot. The exact figures were not announced, but it was reported that Menzies obtained 14 votes out of 26 on the second ballot and that White and McDonald shared the remainder "nearly equally". An election was also held for the deputy leadership, which had been vacant since 1939. White, McDonald, Spender, Harold Holt, and William Hutchinson all nominated, but withdrew when Hughes announced he wished to be a candidate, allowing him to be returned unanimously. At the same meeting, the UAP voted to end the joint opposition arrangement with the Country Party. As a result, Menzies replaced Fadden as Leader of the Opposition.

== See also ==
- 1943 Australian federal election
