= Division of Barker =

Australian federal electoral division

Coordinates: 35.532°S 140.204°E

Barker Australian House of Representatives Division
- Interactive map of boundaries since the 2019 federal election
- Created: 1903
- MP: Tony Pasin
- Party: Liberal
- Namesake: Collet Barker
- Electors: 127,069 (2025)
- Area: 65,206 km^{2} (25,176.2 sq mi)
- Demographic: Rural

The Division of Barker is an Australian electoral division in the south-east of South Australia. The division was established on 2 October 1903, when South Australia's original single multi-member division was split into seven single-member divisions. It is named for Captain Collet Barker, a British military officer and early explorer, prior to the British Settlement of South Australia, of the southern Mount Lofty Ranges, Fleurieu Peninsula and the region at the mouth of the Murray River near the Coorong where he died in 1831 whilst on active duty after successfully solo swimming the channel of water and went compass in hand over a sandhill.

== Geography ==
The 65,206 km² seat currently stretches from Morgan in the north to Port MacDonnell in the south, taking in the Murray Mallee, the Riverland, the Murraylands and most of the Barossa Valley, and includes the towns of Barmera, Berri, Bordertown, Coonawarra, Keith, Kingston SE, Loxton, Lucindale, Mannum, Millicent, Mount Gambier, Murray Bridge, Naracoorte, Penola, Renmark, Robe, Tailem Bend, Waikerie, and parts of Nuriootpa and Tanunda.

== History ==
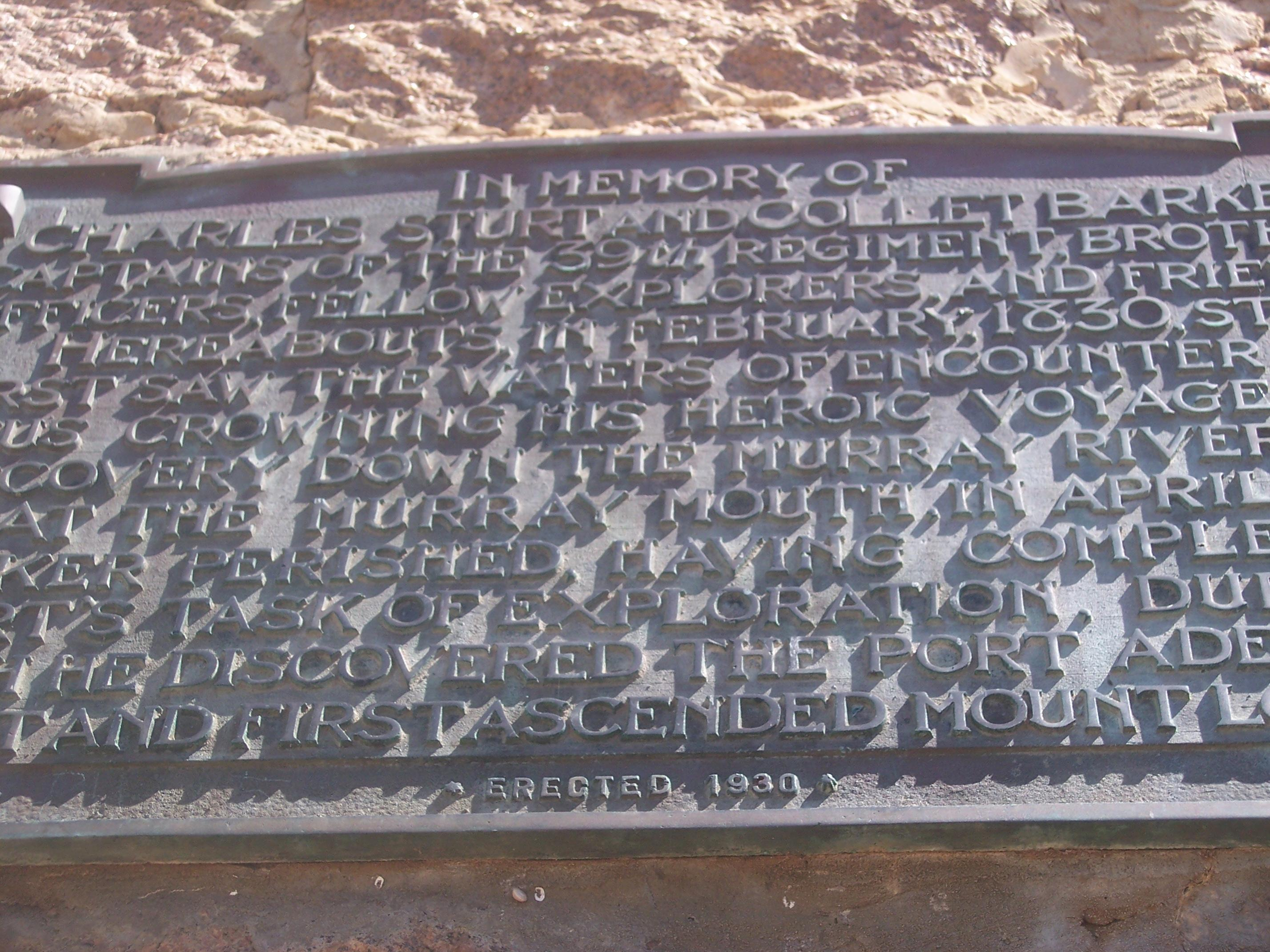
A memorial to Collet Barker, the division's namesake

Barker is the only one of South Australia's remaining original single member seven divisions, created in 1903, that has never been held by the Australian Labor Party and is traditionally the safest seat for the Liberal Party of Australia in the state. It has been in the hands of the Liberals and its predecessors for its entire existence, except for a six-year period when Country Party MP Archie Cameron held it; however, Cameron joined the United Australia Party, direct forerunner of the Liberals, in 1940. The conservative parties have usually had a secure hold on the seat. This tradition has only been threatened three times. Labor came within 1.2 percent of winning the seat at the 1929 election, and within 1.7 percent of winning the seat at the 1943 election. In the latter election, Barker was left as the only non-Labor seat in South Australia, and indeed the only Coalition seat outside the eastern states. It would be seven decades before the conservatives' hold on Barker would be seriously threatened again.

Though it has always covered the state's entire south-east, Barker was historically a hybrid urban-rural seat that extended for some distance into the Adelaide area. Until 1949, only three seats--Adelaide, Boothby and Hindmarsh were based primarily on the capital. For most of the first half-century after Federation, Barker included Glenelg and the Holdfast Bay area, and at times stretched as far as the inner metropolitan suburbs of Keswick and Henley Beach.

However, it became an entirely rural seat after parliament was expanded in the redistribution prior to the 1949 election. Much of Barker's urban portion, including Holdfast Bay, was transferred to the new Division of Kingston. This made the already safely conservative Barker even more so.

Barker had always included Kangaroo Island and the connecting Fleurieu Peninsula until parliament was expanded in the redistribution prior to the 1984 election. They were exchanged between Barker and Mayo for the next two decades, but have been in Mayo since the redistribution prior to the 2004 election, where the massive redistribution of Wakefield, resulting from the abolition of Bonython, saw Barker absorb the Riverland from Wakefield.

Since 1984, federal electoral division boundaries in Australia have been determined at redistributions by a redistribution committee appointed by the Australian Electoral Commission. Redistributions occur for the boundaries of divisions in a particular state, and they occur every seven years, or sooner if a state's representation entitlement changes or when divisions of a state are malapportioned.

The seat's most prominent members have been Cameron, a former leader of the Country Party and later Speaker of the House in the Menzies government, Jim Forbes, a minister in the Menzies, Holt, Gorton and McMahon governments, and Ian McLachlan, Minister for Defence from 1996 to 1998 in the Howard government.

=== 2016 election ===
South Australian Senator Nick Xenophon confirmed in December 2014 that by mid-2015 the Nick Xenophon Team (NXT) would announce candidates in all states and territories at the 2016 election, with Xenophon citing the government's ambiguity on the Collins-class submarine replacement project as motivation. ABC psephologist Antony Green's 2016 federal election guide for South Australia stated NXT had a "strong chance of winning lower house seats and three or four Senate seats".

A ReachTEL seat-level opinion poll in the safe Liberal seat of Barker of 869 voters conducted by robocall on 20 June during the 2016 election campaign surprisingly found NXT candidate James Stacey leading the Liberals' Tony Pasin 52–48 on the two-candidate preferred vote. Seat-level opinion polls in the other two rural Liberal South Australian seats revealed NXT also leading in both Grey and Mayo.

Election-night counting showed that Stacey was second to Pasin on first preferences, however the indicative two-candidate preferred count had been done between Pasin and Labor candidate Mat O'Brien, which meant there was no early indication of whether Stacey would receive enough preferences to beat Pasin before postal, absentee and provisional votes were counted and preferences distributed in the following two weeks. Ultimately, it was confirmed that Stacey had not only overtaken O'Brien on first preferences, but reduced Pasin's margin in Barker to 4.7 percent—thus making Barker a marginal seat for the first time since Cameron's near-defeat in the 1943 landslide. However, Barker remains a comfortably safe Liberal seat in a "traditional" two-party matchup with Labor; Pasin only suffered a one-percent swing against Labor.

== Members ==
Image	Member	Party	Term	Notes
	Sir Langdon Bonython (1848–1939)	Protectionist	16 December 1903 – 8 November 1906	Previously held the Division of South Australia. Retired
	John Livingston (1857–1935)	Anti-Socialist	8 November 1906 – 26 May 1909	Previously held the South Australian House of Assembly seat of Victoria and Albert. Lost preselection and retired
	John Livingston (1857–1935)	Liberal	26 May 1909 – 17 February 1917	Previously held the South Australian House of Assembly seat of Victoria and Albert. Lost preselection and retired
	John Livingston (1857–1935)	Nationalist	17 February 1917 – 6 November 1922	Previously held the South Australian House of Assembly seat of Victoria and Albert. Lost preselection and retired
	Malcolm Cameron (1873–1935)	Liberal Union	16 December 1922 – 1925	Retired
	Malcolm Cameron (1873–1935)	Nationalist	1925 – 7 May 1931	Retired
	Malcolm Cameron (1873–1935)	United Australia	7 May 1931 – 7 August 1934	Retired
	Archie Cameron (1895–1956)	Country	15 September 1934 – 16 October 1940	Previously held the South Australian House of Assembly seat of Wooroora. Served as minister under Lyons, Page and Menzies. Served as deputy prime minister under Menzies. Served as leader of the Country Party from 1939 to 1940. Served as Speaker during the Menzies Government. Died in office
	Archie Cameron (1895–1956)	United Australia	16 October 1940 – 21 February 1945	Previously held the South Australian House of Assembly seat of Wooroora. Served as minister under Lyons, Page and Menzies. Served as deputy prime minister under Menzies. Served as leader of the Country Party from 1939 to 1940. Served as Speaker during the Menzies Government. Died in office
	Archie Cameron (1895–1956)	Liberal	21 February 1945 – 9 August 1956	Previously held the South Australian House of Assembly seat of Wooroora. Served as minister under Lyons, Page and Menzies. Served as deputy prime minister under Menzies. Served as leader of the Country Party from 1939 to 1940. Served as Speaker during the Menzies Government. Died in office
	Jim Forbes (1923–2019)	Liberal	13 October 1956 – 11 November 1975	Served as minister under Menzies, Holt, McEwen, Gorton and McMahon. Retired
	James Porter (1950–)	Liberal	13 December 1975 – 19 February 1990	Lost preselection and retired
	Ian McLachlan (1936–)	Liberal	24 March 1990 – 31 August 1998	Served as minister under Howard. Retired
	Patrick Secker (1956–)	Liberal	3 October 1998 – 5 August 2013	Lost preselection and retired
	Tony Pasin (1977–)	Liberal	7 September 2013 – present	Incumbent

== Election results ==
2025 Australian federal election: Barker
Party	Candidate	Votes	%	±%
Liberal	Tony Pasin	52,460	48.26	−4.98
Labor	James Rothe	24,453	22.49	+1.64
One Nation	Jennifer Troeth	8,908	8.19	+1.61
Greens	Major Moogy Sumner	8,866	8.16	+0.75
Trumpet of Patriots	Robert Jameson	2,983	2.74	+2.02
Independent	Cody Scholes	2,963	2.73	+2.73
Family First	Michael Brohier	2,781	2.56	+2.56
National	Jonathan Pietzsch	1,893	1.74	−0.65
Independent	Rosa Hillam	1,891	1.74	+1.74
Independent	Ian Penno	1,516	1.39	+1.39
Total formal votes		108,714	92.41	−0.63
Informal votes		8,934	7.59	+0.63
Turnout		117,648	92.60	+0.40
Two-party-preferred result
Liberal	Tony Pasin	68,465	62.98	−3.64
Labor	James Rothe	40,249	37.02	+3.64
Liberal hold		Swing	−3.64	

Alluvial diagram illustrating the full distribution of preferences in the seat of Barker for the 2025 Federal Election
