= List of state divisions of the Liberal Party of Australia =

Liberal Party of Australia
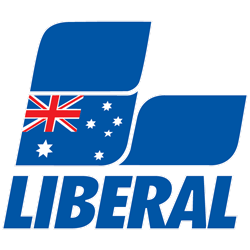
- International affiliation: International Democrat Union; Asia Pacific Democracy Union (from 2022) (regional partner)
- Colours: Blue

Website
- www.liberal.org.au

This is a list of articles for the official state and territorial party organisations (or equivalents) of the Liberal Party of Australia.

- Liberal Party of Australia (New South Wales Division) (Site)
- Liberal Party of Australia (Victorian Division) (Site)
- Liberal National Party (Queensland) (Site)
- Liberal Party of Australia (Western Australian Division) (Site)
- Liberal Party of Australia (South Australian Division) (Site)
- Liberal Party of Australia (Tasmanian Division) (Site)
- Liberal Party of Australia (Australian Capital Territory Division) (Site)
- Country Liberal Party (Northern Territory) (Site)
