= United Australia Party =

Australian political party (1931–1945)

- 1931 magazine advertisement emblem
- Abbreviation: UAP
- Founded: 7 May 1931; 95 years ago
- Dissolved: 31 August 1945; 81 years ago
- Merger of: Nationalist; Australian; All for Australia League
- Succeeded by: Liberal
- Membership (1940s): ▲22,500 (Note: The figure given for the UAP's peak membership was a notional estimate, mathematically estimated based on branches, and branch membership figures. C.J. Lloyd, the source behind the membership estimates, also stated that, "It is unlikely that the peak subscribing membership of the UAP ever exceeded 20,000," adding: "The active membership was much smaller – certainly less than half and possibly as low as 25 per cent.")
- Ideology: Liberalism; Conservatism; Monarchism; Anti-communism (Note: In the 1930s and 40s, rhetorically the UAP held a strong and consistent line against communism. Having taken office following the 1939 UAP leadership election, the Menzies government (1939–1941) dissolved the Communist Party under the National Security (Subversive Associations) Regulations 1940. This was one of many legal, and political, disputes between the UAP and its successor (Liberal) against the Communist Party.); 1940s: Economic liberalism
- Political position: Centre-right to right-wing
- National affiliation: Coalition (1934–1939; 1940–1943)
- Colours: Blue
- Party branches: Qld; Vic
- House of Representatives: 34 / 76 (1931–1934)
- Senate: 26 / 36 (1935–1938)

The United Australia Party (UAP) was an Australian political party which was founded in 1931 and dissolved in 1945. It won four federal elections in that time, usually governing in coalition with the Country Party. It provided two prime ministers: Joseph Lyons (1932–1939) and Robert Menzies (1939–1941).

The UAP was created in the aftermath of the 1931 split in the Australian Labor Party. Six fiscally conservative Labor MPs left the party to protest the Scullin government's financial policies during the Great Depression. Led by Joseph Lyons, a former Premier of Tasmania, the defectors initially sat as independents, but then agreed to merge with the Nationalist Party and form a united opposition. Lyons was chosen as the new party's leader due to his popularity among the general public, with former Nationalist leader John Latham becoming his deputy. He led the UAP to a landslide victory at the 1931 federal election, where the party secured an outright majority in the House of Representatives and was able to form government in its own right.

After the 1934 election, the UAP entered into a coalition with the Country Party; it retained government at the 1937 election. After Lyons' death in April 1939, the UAP elected Robert Menzies as its new leader. This resulted in the Country Party leaving the coalition, but a new coalition agreement was reached in March 1940. The 1940 election resulted in a hung parliament and the formation of a minority government with support from two independents. In August 1941, Menzies was forced to resign as prime minister in favour of Arthur Fadden, the Country Party leader; he in turn survived only 40 days before losing a confidence motion and making way for a Labor government under John Curtin. Fadden continued on as Leader of the Opposition, with Billy Hughes replacing Menzies as UAP leader. Hughes resigned after the 1943 election, and Menzies subsequently returned as UAP leader and Leader of the Opposition. The UAP ceased to exist as a parliamentary party in February 1945, when its members joined the new Liberal Party of Australia. The modern United Australia Party has no connection or relationship with the former party.

== History ==
=== Background ===
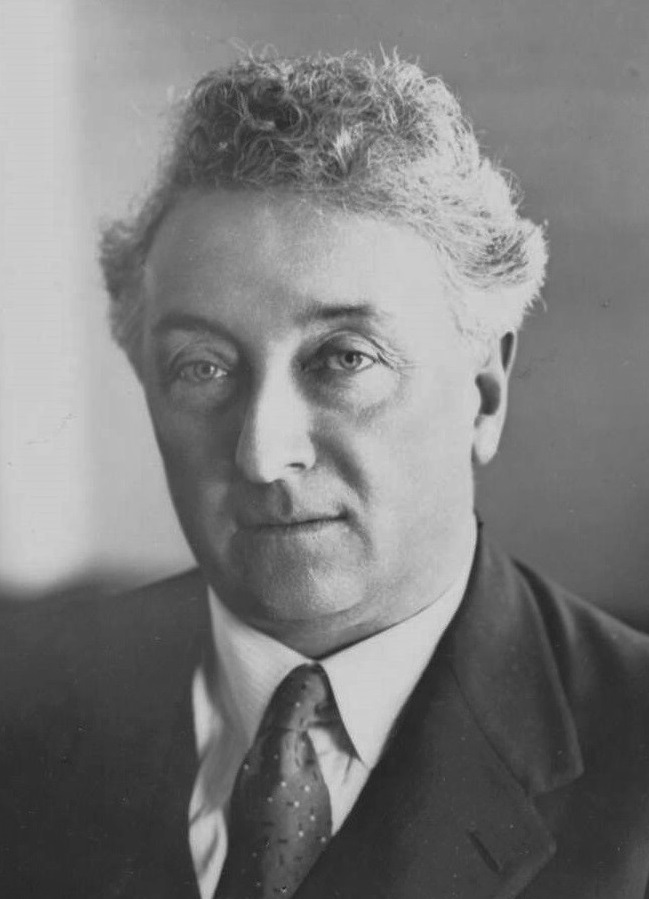
Joseph Lyons, inaugural leader of the UAP and the party's first prime minister

Joseph Lyons began his political career as an Australian Labor Party politician and served as Premier of Tasmania. Lyons was elected to the Australian Federal Parliament in 1929 and served in Prime Minister James Scullin's Labor Cabinet. Lyons became acting Treasurer in 1930 and helped negotiate the government's strategies for dealing with the Great Depression. With Scullin temporarily absent in London, Lyons and acting Prime Minister James Fenton clashed with the Labor Cabinet and Caucus over economic policy, and grappled with the differing proposals of the Premier's Plan, Lang Labor, the Commonwealth Bank and British adviser Otto Niemeyer.

While Health Minister Frank Anstey supported Premier of New South Wales Jack Lang's bid to default on debt repayments, Lyons advocated orthodox fiscal management. When Labor reinstated the more radical Ted Theodore as Treasurer in 1931, Lyons and Fenton resigned from Cabinet.

=== Foundation ===
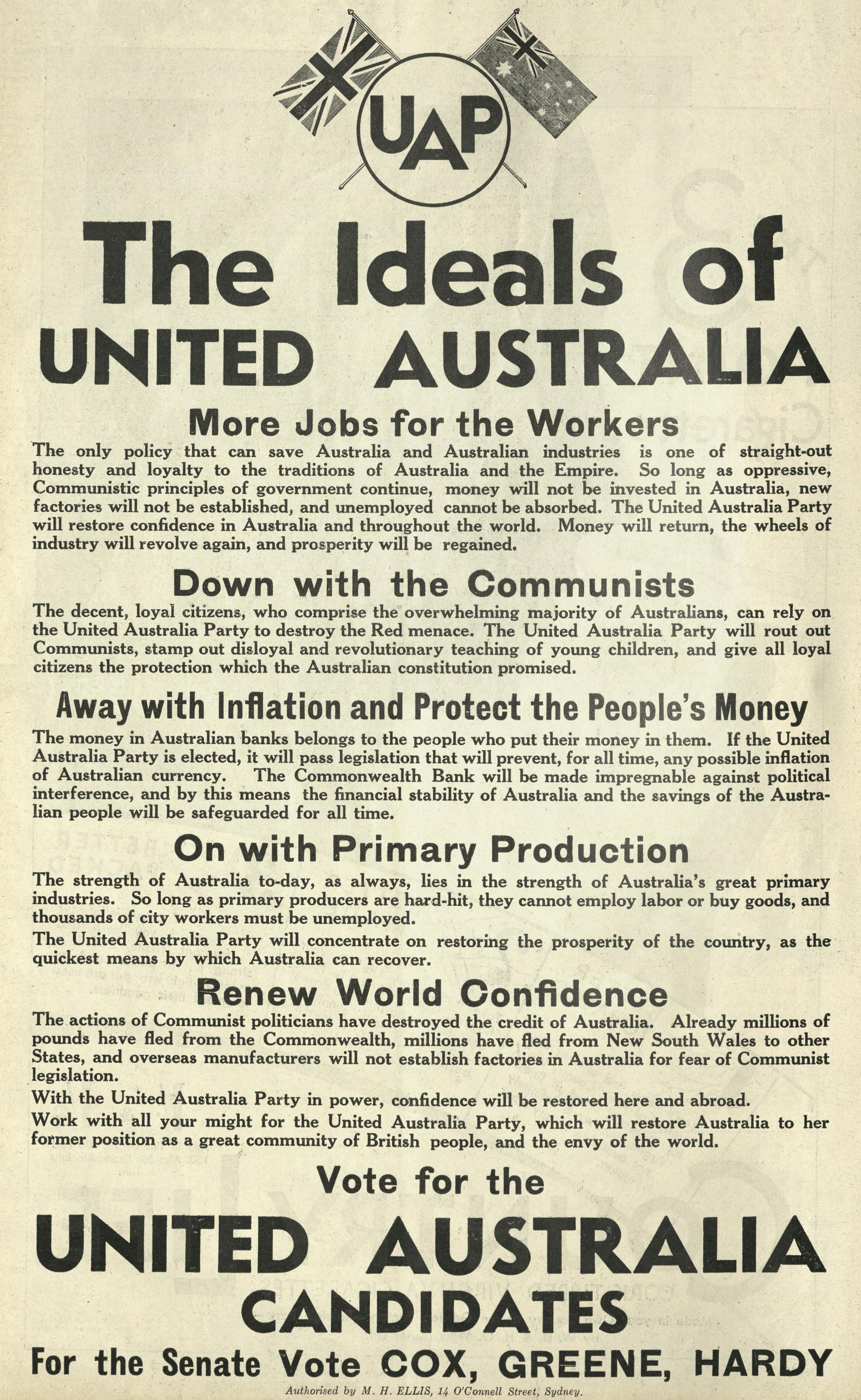
Advertisement for the U.A.P. published in The Bulletin prior to the 1931 federal election.

The UAP was formed in 1931 by Labor dissidents and a conservative coalition as a response to the more radical economic proposals of Labor Party members to deal with the Great Depression in Australia. Lyons and Fenton's opposition to the economic policies of the Scullin Labor government had attracted the support of a circle of socially prominent Melburnians known as "the Group" or "Group of Six", comprising stockbroker Staniforth Ricketson, insurance company president Charles Arthur Norris, metallurgist and businessman John Michael Higgins, writer Ambrose Pratt, state attorney-general Robert Menzies, and architect Kingsley Henderson. In parliament on 13 March 1931, though still a member of the ALP, Lyons supported a no confidence motion against the Scullin Labor government. Soon afterward, Lyons, Fenton and four other right-wing Labor MPs—Moses Gabb, Allan Guy, Charles McGrath and John Price—resigned from the ALP in protest of the Scullin government's economic policies. Five of the six Labor dissidents crossed over to the opposition benches. On 7 May, the Labor dissidents, the Nationalist opposition (hitherto led by John Latham) and former Prime Minister Billy Hughes' Australian Party (a group of former Nationalists who had been expelled for crossing the floor and bringing down Stanley Bruce's Nationalist government in 1929), merged to form the UAP. Although the new party was dominated by former Nationalists, Lyons was chosen as the new party's leader, and thus became Leader of the Opposition, with Latham as his deputy. The Western Australia branch of the Nationalists, however, retained the Nationalist name.

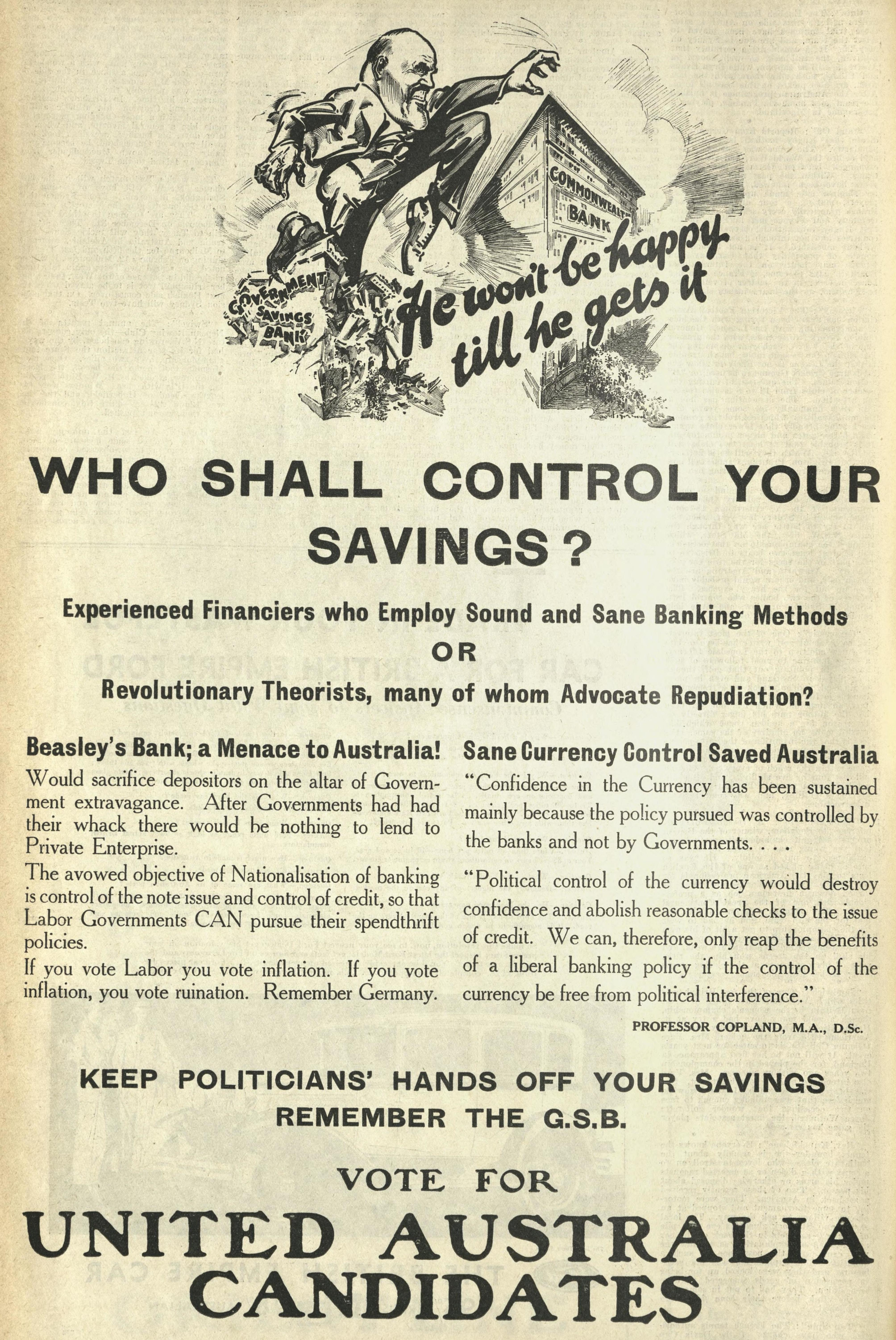
At the 1931 federal election, the UAP campaigned on a platform of economic conservatism, accusing the Labor governments of James Scullin and Jack Lang of destroying the economy

Claiming that the Scullin government was incapable of managing the economy, it offered traditional deflationary economic policies in response to Australia's economic crisis. Though it was basically an upper- and middle-class conservative party, the presence of ex-Labor MPs with working-class backgrounds allowed the party to present a convincing image of national unity transcending class barriers. This was especially true of the party leader, Lyons. Indeed, he had been chosen as the merged party's leader because he was thought to be more electorally appealing than the aloof Latham, and was thus better suited to win over traditional Labor supporters to the UAP.

A further split, this time of left-wing NSW Labor MPs who supported the unorthodox economic policies of NSW Premier Jack Lang, cost the Scullin government its parliamentary majority. In November 1931, Lang Labor dissidents broke with the Scullin government and joined with the UAP opposition to pass a no-confidence motion, forcing an early election.

=== Lyons government ===
With the Labor Party split between Scullin's supporters and Langites, and with a very popular leader (Lyons had a genial manner and the common touch), the UAP won the elections in December 1931 in a massive landslide which saw the two wings of the Labor Party cut down to 18 seats between them, and Lyons became Prime Minister in January 1932. He took office at the helm of a UAP majority government. The UAP initially hoped to renew the non-Labor Coalition with the Country Party of Earle Page after coming up four seats short of a majority in its own right. However, the five MPs elected from the Emergency Committee of South Australia, which stood in place of the UAP and Country Party in South Australia, joined the UAP party room, giving the UAP a bare majority of two seats. When negotiations with Page broke down, Lyons formed an exclusively UAP government. In 1934, the UAP lost six seats, forcing Lyons to take the Country Party into his government in a full-fledged Coalition.

The Lyons government followed the conservative economic policies it had promised in opposition, and benefited politically from the gradual worldwide economic recovery as the 1930s went on.

==== Response to Depression ====
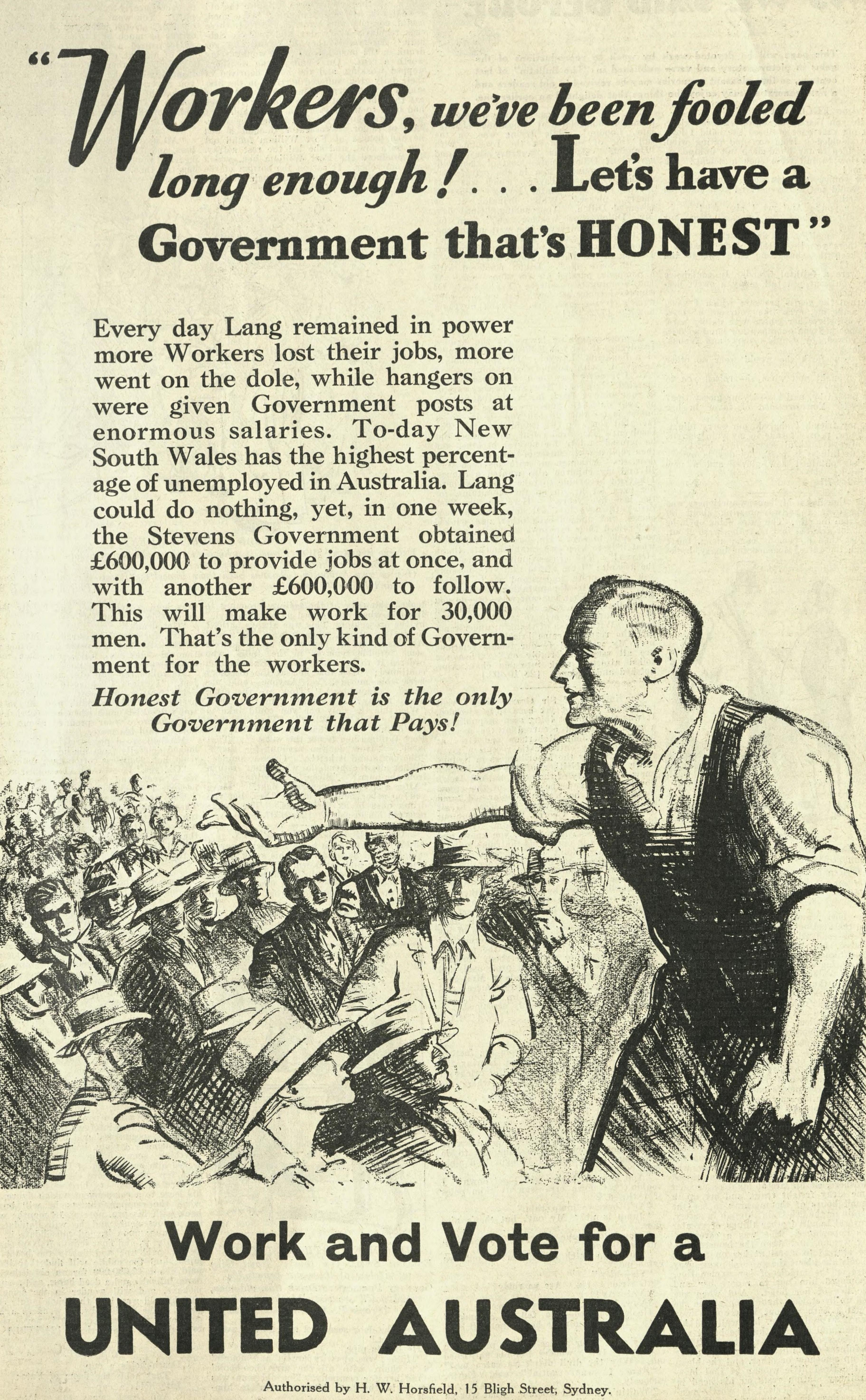
Anti-Lang advertisement used by the UAP at the 1932 New South Wales state election

Lyons favoured the tough economic measures of the "Premiers' Plan", pursued an orthodox fiscal policy and refused to accept NSW Premier Jack Lang's proposals to default on overseas debt repayments. A dramatic episode in Australian history followed Lyons' first electoral victory when NSW Premier Jack Lang refused to pay interest on overseas State debts. The Lyons government stepped in and paid the debts and then passed the Financial Agreement Enforcement Act to recover the money it had paid. In an effort to frustrate this move, Lang ordered State departments to pay all receipts directly to the Treasury instead of into Government bank accounts. The New South Wales Governor, Sir Philip Game, intervened on the basis that Lang had acted illegally in breach of the state Audit Act and sacked the Lang Government, who then suffered a landslide loss at the consequent 1932 state election.

Australia entered the Depression with a debt crisis and a credit crisis. According to author Anne Henderson of the Sydney Institute, Lyons held a steadfast belief in "the need to balance budgets, lower costs to business and restore confidence" and the Lyons period gave Australia "stability and eventual growth" between the drama of the Depression and the outbreak of the Second World War. A lowering of wages was enforced and industry tariff protections maintained, which together with cheaper raw materials during the 1930s saw a shift from agriculture to manufacturing as the chief employer of the Australian economy – a shift which was consolidated by increased investment by the commonwealth government into defence and armaments manufacture. Lyons saw restoration of Australia's exports as the key to economic recovery. A devalued Australian currency assisted in restoring a favourable balance of trade. Tariffs had been a point of difference between the Country Party and United Australia Party. The CP opposed high tariffs because they increased costs for farmers, while the UAP had support among manufacturers who supported tariffs. Lyons was therefore happy to be perceived as "protectionist". Australia agreed to give tariff preference to British Empire goods, following the 1932 Imperial economic conference. The Lyons government lowered interest rates to stimulate expenditure. Another point of difference was the issue of establishing national unemployment insurance. Debate on this issue became strained with the Country Party opposing the plan. On this issue, deputy leader Robert Menzies and Country Party leader Earle Page would have a public falling out.

According to author Brian Carroll, Lyons had been underestimated when he assumed office in 1932 and as leader he demonstrated: "a combination of honesty, native shrewdness, tact, administrative ability, common sense, good luck and good humour that kept him in the job longer than any previous Prime Minister except Hughes". Lyons was assisted in his campaigning by his politically active wife, Enid Lyons. She had a busy official role from 1932 to 1939 and, following her husband's death, stood for Parliament herself, becoming Australia's first female Member of the House of Representatives, and later first woman in Cabinet, joining the Menzies Cabinet in 1951.

==== Preparation for war ====
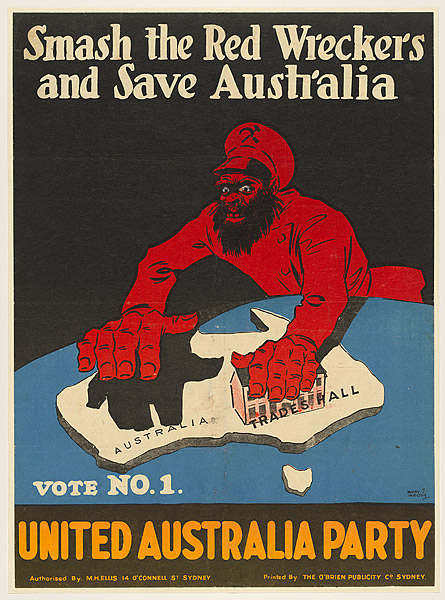
Anti-communist poster promoting the UAP

Defence issues became increasingly dominant in public affairs with the rise of fascism in Europe and militant Japan in Asia. The UAP largely supported the western powers in their policy of appeasement, however veteran UAP minister Billy Hughes was an exception and he embarrassed the government with his 1935 book Australia and the War Today which exposed a lack of preparation in Australia for what Hughes correctly supposed to be a coming war. Hughes was forced to resign, but the Lyons government tripled its defence budget.

On 7 April 1939, with the storm clouds of the Second World War gathering in Europe and the Pacific, Joseph Lyons became the first Prime Minister of Australia to die in office. Driving from Canberra to Sydney, en route to his home in Tasmania for Easter, he suffered a heart attack, dying soon after in hospital in Sydney, on Good Friday. The UAP's Deputy leader, Robert Menzies, had resigned in March, citing the coalition's failure to implement a plan for national insurance. In the absence of a UAP deputy, the Governor-General, Lord Gowrie, appointed Country Party leader Sir Earle Page as his temporary replacement, pending the selection of Lyons' successor by the UAP.

=== Menzies government ===
Robert Menzies defeated Hughes for the UAP leadership and became Prime Minister on 26 April 1939. Page refused to serve under Menzies, leaving the UAP with a minority government.

In addition to the office of Prime Minister, Menzies served as Treasurer. The First Menzies Ministry included the ageing former Prime Minister Billy Hughes and the young future Prime Minister Harold Holt. Menzies tried and failed to have the issue of national insurance examined by a committee of parliamentarians. Though no longer in formal coalition, his government survived because the Country Party preferred a UAP government to that of a Labor government.

==== World War II ====
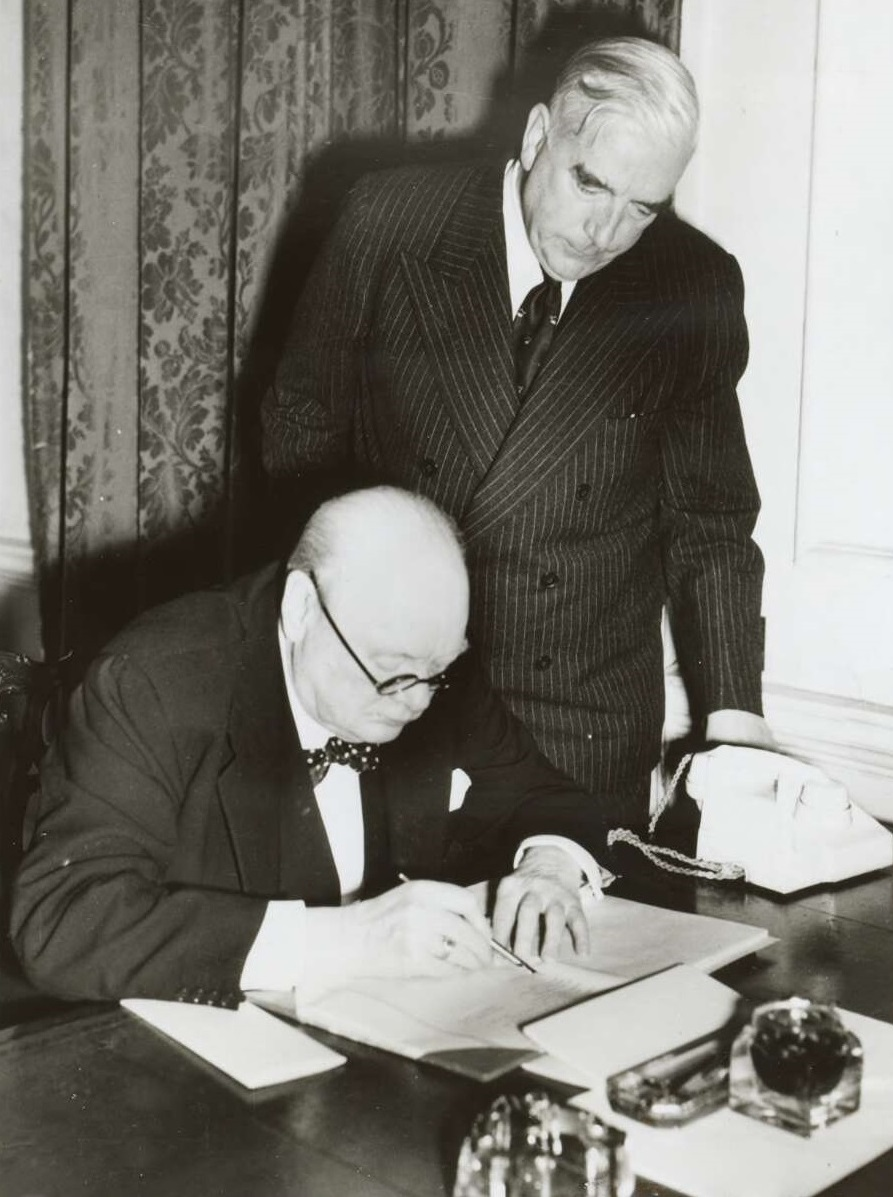
Prime Minister Robert Menzies and British Prime Minister Winston Churchill in 1941.

The growing threat of war dominated politics through 1939. Menzies supported British policy against Hitler's Germany (negotiate for peace, but prepare for war) and – fearing Japanese intentions in the Pacific – established independent embassies in Tokyo and Washington to receive independent advice about developments. Menzies announced Australia's entry into World War Two on 3 September 1939 as a consequence of Nazi Germany's invasion of Poland. Australia was ill-prepared for war. A National Security Act was passed, the recruitment of a volunteer military force for service at home and abroad was announced, the 2nd Australian Imperial Force, and a citizen militia was organised for local defence.

Troubled by Britain's failure to increase defences at Singapore, Menzies was cautious in committing troops to Europe, nevertheless in 1940–41, Australian forces played prominent roles in the fighting in the Mediterranean theatre.

A special War Cabinet was created;– initially composed of Menzies and five senior ministers (RG Casey, GA Street, Senator McLeay, HS Gullet and World War I Prime Minister Billy Hughes). In January 1940, Menzies dispatched potential leadership rival Richard Casey to Washington as Australia's first "Minister to the United States". In a consequent by-election, the UAP suffered a heavy defeat and Menzies re-entered coalition negotiations with the Country Party. In March 1940, troubled negotiations were concluded with the Country Party to re-enter Coalition with the UAP. The replacement of Earle Page as leader by Archie Cameron allowed Menzies to reach accommodation. A new Coalition ministry was formed including a number of Country Party members.

With the 1940 election looming, Menzies lost his Chief of the General Staff and three loyal ministers in the Canberra air disaster. The Labor Party meanwhile experienced a split along pro and anti Communist lines over policy towards the Soviet Union for its co-operation with Nazi Germany in the invasion of Poland; this resulted in the formation of the Non-Communist Labor Party. The Communist Party of Australia (CPA) opposed and sought to disrupt Australia's war effort. Menzies banned the CPA after the fall of France in 1940, but by 1941 Stalin was forced to join the allied cause when Hitler reneged on the Pact and invaded the USSR. The USSR came to bear the brunt of the carnage of Hitler's war machine and the Communist Party in Australia lost its early war stigma as a result.

At the general election in September 1940, there was a large swing to Labor and the UAP-Country Party coalition lost its majority, continuing in office only because of the support of two independent MPs, Arthur Coles and Alexander Wilson. The UAP–Country Party coalition and the Labor parties won 36 seats each. Menzies proposed an all party unity government to break the impasse, but the Labor Party under John Curtin refused to join. Curtin agreed instead to take a seat on a newly created Advisory War Council in October 1940. New Country Party leader Arthur Fadden became Treasurer and Menzies unhappily conceded to allow Earle Page back into his ministry.

In January 1941, Menzies flew to Britain to discuss the weakness of Singapore's defences and sat with Winston Churchill's British War Cabinet. En route he inspected Singapore's defences – finding them alarmingly inadequate – and visited Australian troops in the Mid-East. He at times clashed with Churchill in the War Cabinet, and was unable to achieve significant assurances for increased commitment to Singapore's defences, but undertook morale boosting excursions to war affected cities and factories and was well received by the British press and generally raised awareness in Britain of Australia's contribution to its war effort. He returned to Australia via Canada and the United States – addressing the Canadian parliament and lobbying President Roosevelt for more arms production. After four months, Menzies returned to Australia to face a lack of enthusiasm for his global travels and a war-time minority government under ever increasing strain.

In Menzies's absence, Curtin had co-operated with Fadden in preparing Australia for the expected Pacific War. With the threat of Japan imminent and with the Australian army suffering badly in the Greek and Crete campaigns, Menzies re-organised his ministry and announced multiple multi-party committees to advise on war and economic policy. Government critics however called for an all-party government.

==== Menzies' resignation ====
In August, Cabinet decided that Menzies should travel back to Britain to represent Australia in the War Cabinet – but this time the Labor caucus refused to support the plan. Menzies announced to his Cabinet that he thought he should resign and advise the Governor General to invite Curtin to form Government. The Cabinet instead insisted he approach Curtin again to form a war cabinet. Unable to secure Curtin's support, and with an unworkable parliamentary majority, Menzies faced continuing problems with the administration of the war effort and the undermining of his leadership by members of his own coalition. Menzies resigned as prime minister on 29 August 1941, but initially stayed on as UAP leader.

=== Fadden government ===
Following Menzies' resignation, a joint UAP–Country Party meeting chose Fadden to be his successor as prime minister, even though the Country Party was the junior partner in the coalition. Menzies became Minister for Defence Co-ordination.

Australia marked two years of war on 7 September 1941 with a day of prayer, on which Prime Minister Fadden broadcast to the nation an exhortation to be united in the "supreme task of defeating the forces of evil in the world". With the Pacific on the brink of war, Opposition leader John Curtin offered friendship and co-operation to Fadden, but refused to join in an all-party wartime national government.

Coles and Wilson were angered at how Menzies had been treated, and on 3 October voted with the Opposition in the House of Representatives to reject Fadden's budget; Fadden promptly resigned. This became a rare moment in Parliament in which a sitting government is defeated in the House. This did not occur in Australia again for another 78 years. Under the prodding of Governor-General Lord Gowrie, who wanted to avoid calling an election given the dangerous international situation, Coles and Wilson threw their support to Labor. Gowrie then duly swore Curtin in as prime minister on 7 October 1941. Eight weeks later, Japan attacked Pearl Harbor.

On 9 October, Menzies resigned as UAP leader, but not before calling for a partyroom meeting to determine whether the party should form a united opposition with the Country Party or go it alone. His preferred option was the latter, and he had intended to re-contest the leadership if he was successful. However, the party voted 19–12 to form a united opposition under the leadership of Fadden. Although the UAP had been in government for a decade, Menzies' resignation revealed a party almost completely bereft of leadership. With no obvious successor to Menzies, the UAP was forced to turn to the 79-year-old former prime minister Billy Hughes as its new leader. With Menzies out and the aged Hughes seen as a stop-gap leader, UAP members jostled for position.

The UAP had first won power by winning the 1931 election before losing government on the floor of parliament in 1941 was in reverse circumstances of how its predecessor the Nationalists came in and out of power.

The Nationalists as a new party came into government on the floor of parliament in 1917 before eventually losing power at the 1929 election.

Notwithstanding Country Party leader Fadden had led the Coalition into the 1943 election, the Nationalists and UAP leaders never led the Coalition into an election after losing government.

=== Demise of the party ===
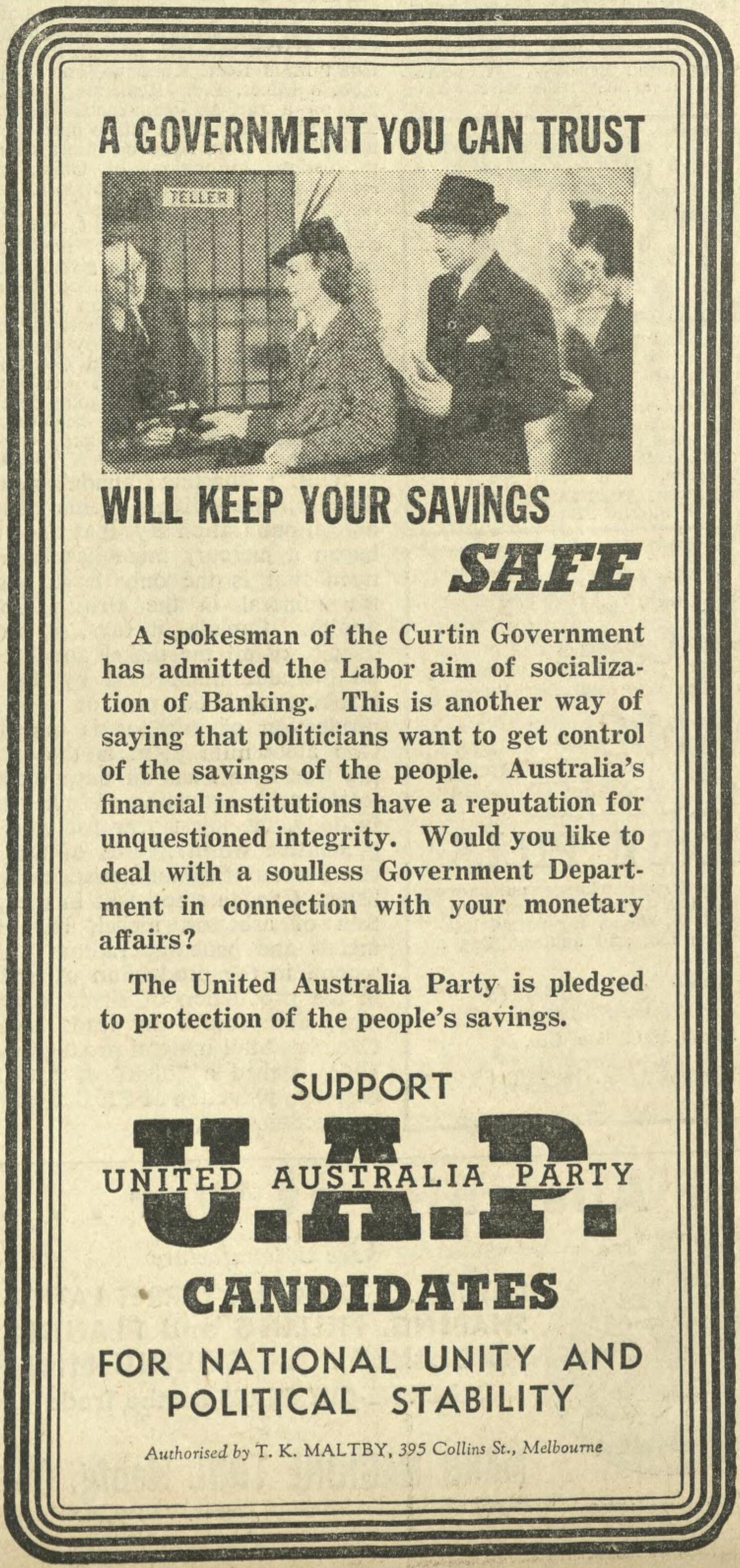
Advertisement used by the UAP during the 1943 Australian federal election, its final campaign before the party was wound up

Having spent all but eight months of its existence prior to 1941 in government, the UAP was ill-prepared for a role in opposition. Curtin proved a popular leader, rallying the nation in the face of the danger of invasion by the Japanese after Japan's entry into the war in December 1941. Even allowing for the advantages a sitting government has in wartime, the Labor government seemed more effective than its predecessor, while Fadden and Hughes were unable to get the better of Curtin. By the time the writs were issued for the 1943 federal election, the Coalition had sunk into a state of near paralysis, and at the election, suffered a landslide defeat, being reduced to only 23 seats nationwide, including 14 for the UAP.

After this election defeat, Menzies returned to the UAP leadership, and Fadden handed the post of opposition leader to him as well. However, as the Nationalists had a decade earlier, the party and its organisation now seemed moribund, particularly in NSW. UAP branches tended to become inactive between elections, and its politicians were seen as compromised by their reliance on large donations from business and financial organisations. In New South Wales, the party merged with the Commonwealth Party to form the Democratic Party, which merged with the Liberal Democratic Party the following year. In Queensland the state branch was absorbed into the Queensland People's Party.

Menzies became convinced that the UAP was no longer viable, and a new anti-Labor party needed to be formed to replace it. He circulated a confidential memorandum expressing his wish for the UAP to be replaced:

The name United Australia Party has fallen into complete disregard. It no longer means anything. Many of my own strongest supporters in my own electorate decline to have anything to do with the Party as such. [...] To establish a new party under a new name, it is, I think, essential to recognise that the new groups and movements which sprang up in the six months before the election were all expressions of dissatisfaction with the existing set-up. [...] The time between now and the next election is already beginning to run out!

On 31 August 1945, the UAP was absorbed into the newly formed Liberal Party of Australia, with Menzies as its leader. The new party was dominated by former UAP members; with a few exceptions, the UAP party room became the Liberal party room.

The Liberal Party went on to become the dominant centre-right party in Australian politics. After an initial loss to Labor at the 1946 election, Menzies led the new non-Labor Coalition (of the Liberal and Country parties) to victory at the 1949 election, defeating the incumbent Labor government led by Curtin's successor, Ben Chifley. The Coalition stayed in office for a record 23 years.

== Electoral performance ==
Election	Leader	Votes	%	Seats	+/–	Position	Status
1931	Joseph Lyons	1,145,083	36.1	33 / 75	▲33	▲1st	Majority
1934	Joseph Lyons	1,170,978	32.9	32 / 75	▼6	1st	Coalition with the Country Party
1937	Joseph Lyons	1,214,526	33.7	28 / 75	0	▼2nd	Coalition with the Country Party
1940	Robert Menzies	1,171,788	30.2	26 / 75	▼5	2nd	Minority government coalition with Country Party
1943	Billy Hughes	927,049	22.5	14 / 75	▼9	2nd	Opposition

Note: the United Australia Party did not run candidates in South Australia in 1931. The Emergency Committee of South Australia was the main anti-Labor party, but five MPs elected under that banner joined the parliamentary UAP after the election.

== Leaders ==
=== Party leaders ===
Leader
No.	Leader (birth–death)	Portrait	Electorate	Took office	Left office	Prime Minister (term)
1	Joseph Lyons (1879–1939)		Wilmot, Tas.	7 May 1931	7 April 1939 (died in office)	Scullin (1929–1932)
1	Joseph Lyons (1879–1939)		Wilmot, Tas.	7 May 1931	7 April 1939 (died in office)	Himself (1932–1939)
2	Robert Menzies (1894–1978)		Kooyong, Vic.	18 April 1939 (elected; third ballot)	9 October 1941	Page (1939)
2	Robert Menzies (1894–1978)		Kooyong, Vic.	18 April 1939 (elected; third ballot)	9 October 1941	Himself (1939–1941)
2	Robert Menzies (1894–1978)		Kooyong, Vic.	18 April 1939 (elected; third ballot)	9 October 1941	Fadden (1941)
3	Billy Hughes (1862–1952)		North Sydney, NSW	9 October 1941 (elected; second ballot)	22 September 1943	Curtin (1941–1945)
(2)	Robert Menzies (1894–1978)		Kooyong, Vic.	22 September 1943 (elected; second ballot)	21 February 1945	Curtin (1941–1945)

=== Party deputy leaders ===
Deputy Leader
No.	Leader (birth–death)	Portrait	Electorate	Took office	Left office
1	John Latham (1877–1964)		Kooyong, Vic.	7 May 1931	15 September 1934
2	Robert Menzies (1894–1978)		Kooyong, Vic.	4 December 1935	20 March 1939
3	Billy Hughes (1862–1952)		North Sydney, NSW	22 September 1943	14 April 1944
4	Eric Harrison (1892–1974)		Wentworth, NSW	14 April 1944	21 February 1945
