= 1939 United Australia Party leadership election =

- 18 April 1939
- Turnout: 95.45% (Third ballot)
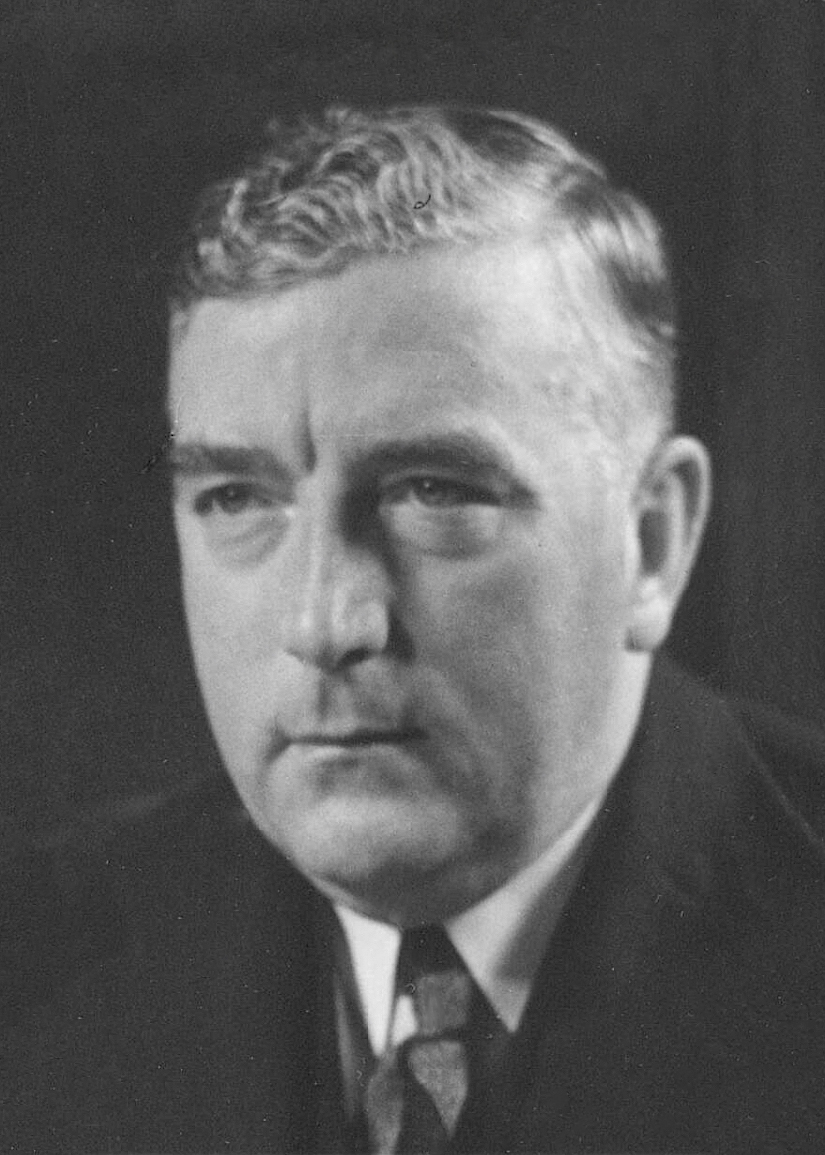

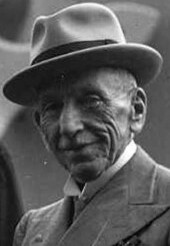

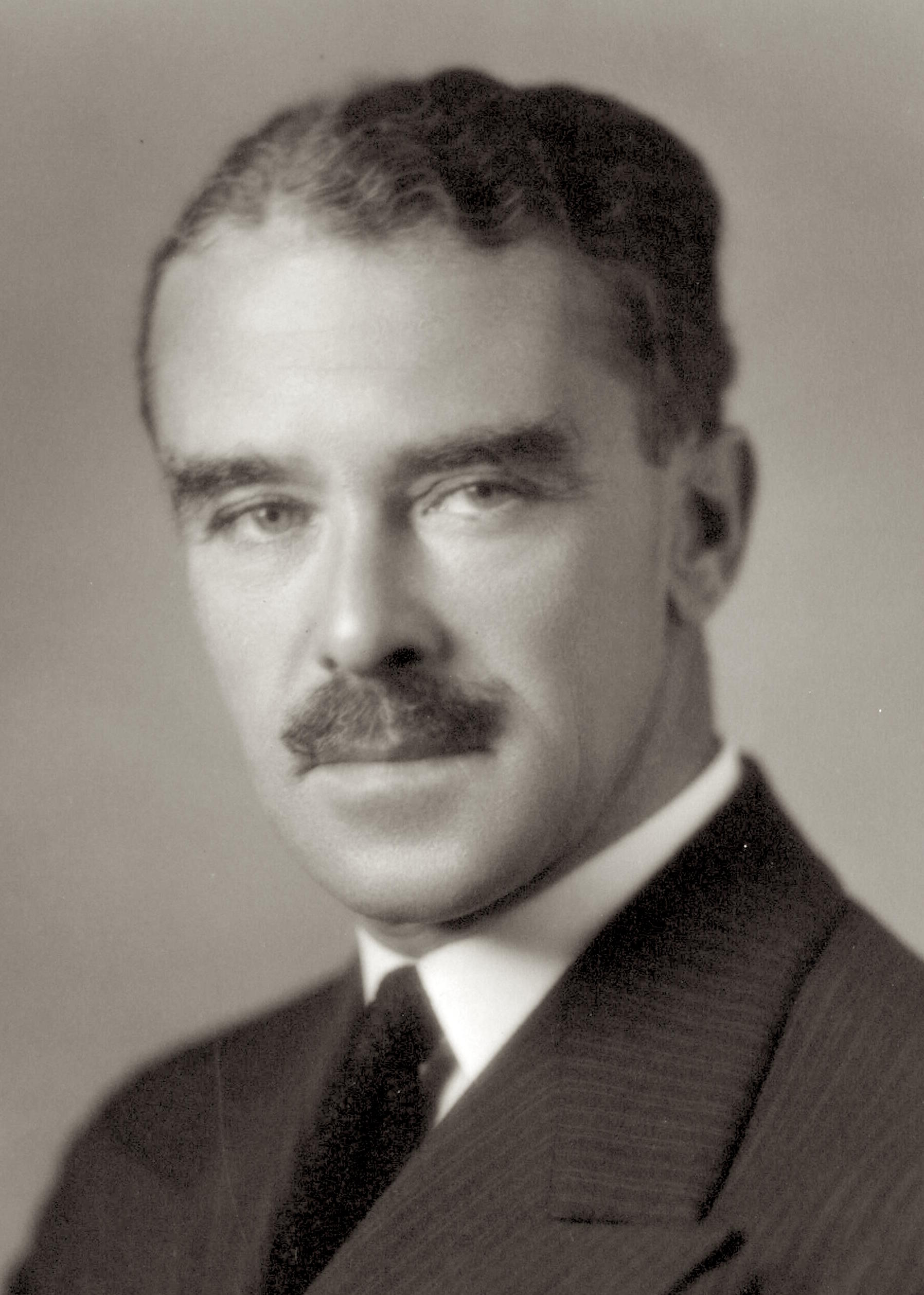

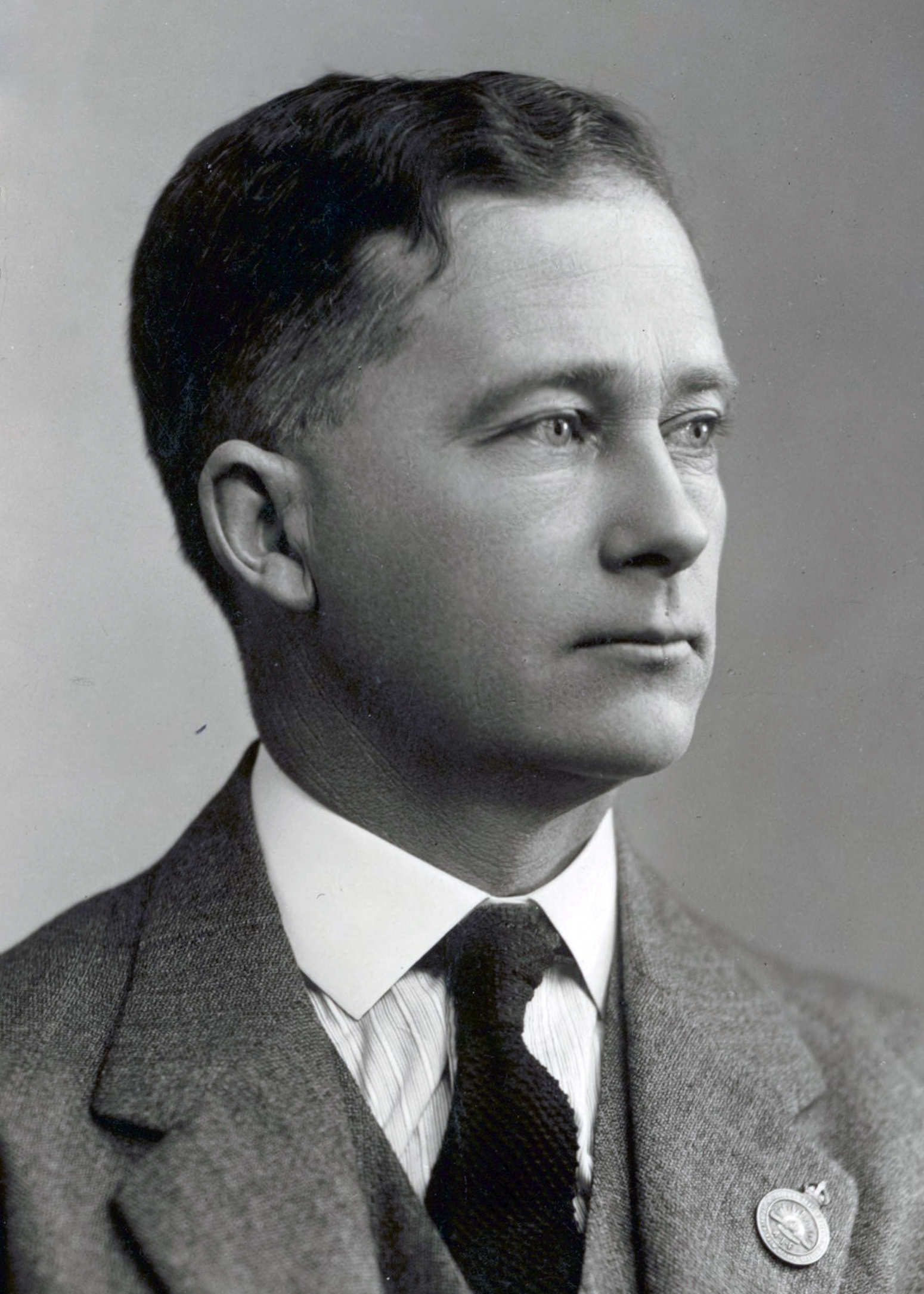
Candidate	Robert Menzies	Billy Hughes
First ballot	N/A	N/A
Second ballot	22 (50.0%)	22 (50.0%)
Third ballot	23 (54.8%)	19 (45.2%)
Candidate	Richard Casey	Thomas White
First ballot	Withdrew	Withdrew
Leader before election
Joseph Lyons
Elected Leader
Robert Menzies

The United Australia Party held a leadership election on 18 April 1939, following the death in office of Prime Minister Joseph Lyons on 7 April. Robert Menzies narrowly defeated Billy Hughes – a former Nationalist prime minister – on the third ballot, following the earlier elimination of Treasurer Richard Casey and Trade Minister Thomas White. Another former prime minister, Stanley Bruce, had also been considered a leadership contender, but for various reasons (including his position outside of parliament as High Commissioner to the United Kingdom) he was never nominated. Menzies was not sworn in as prime minister until 26 April.

== Background ==
Following the death of Prime Minister and United Australia Party (UAP) leader Joseph Lyons on 7 April 1939, the United Australia Party was to hold a leadership election eleven days later to decide whom the next UAP leader and Prime Minister would be. After the death of Lyons, de facto Deputy Prime Minister of the Lyons government and Country Party leader, Earle Page, formed a caretaker government that would remain in government until the conclusion of the UAP leadership election. George Fairbanks, in the Australian Quarterly, wrote of the lead-up to the leadership contest: “The next fortnight witnessed one of the most dramatic episodes in Australian politics; there was "fierce lobbying" by aspirants to the leadership, while a small group organised by Page and Casey tried desperately to stop the succession of Menzies.”

Page was given the assurance of then-Leader of the Opposition John Curtin (Labor) to continue with the government until the next federal election. However, Page rejected the offer. Both Casey and Page were strongly opposed to Menzies becoming leader and lobbied ardently for former prime minister Stanley Bruce to return to office.

== Results ==
1939 United Australia Party leadership election
Party	Candidate	Votes	%	±%
United Australia	Robert Menzies	N/A		
United Australia	Billy Hughes	N/A		
United Australia	Richard Casey	withdrew		
United Australia	Thomas White	withdrew		
Second ballot result
United Australia	Robert Menzies	22	50.00	
United Australia	Billy Hughes	22	50.00	
Turnout		44	100.0	
Final ballot result
United Australia	Robert Menzies	23	54.80	+4.80
United Australia	Billy Hughes	19	45.20	−4.80
Turnout		42	95.50	−4.50

== Newspaper endorsements ==
The press took a keen interest in the leadership contest, which was one of the first in which a party chose a new prime minister in an open fashion with multiple viable candidates. In Melbourne, The Age endorsed Menzies as the new prime minister on 8 April, only a day after Lyons' death. The Argus endorsed Casey, arguing that he had remained loyal to Lyons and the government where Menzies had not. The Herald on 12 April stated a slight preference for Bruce, but observed that it would probably be too difficult to recall him from London and that Menzies was the only other alternative. It gave a more enthusiastic endorsement of Menzies two days later. In Sydney, The Daily Telegraph supported Casey, while The Sydney Morning Herald was an "earnest advocate of recalling Bruce".

== See also ==
- Menzies Government (1939–41)
- 1939 Country Party of Australia leadership election
- Other leadership ballots held following the death of a prime minister:
  - 1945 Australian Labor Party leadership election
  - 1968 Liberal Party of Australia leadership election

== Sources ==
- Henderson, Anne (2011). Joseph Lyons: The People's Prime Minister. NewSouth Books. ISBN 9781742231426.
- Hudson, William James (1986). Casey. Oxford University Press. ISBN 0195547306.
- Martin, Allan (1993). Robert Menzies: A Life. Vol. 1 (1894–1943). Melbourne University Press. ISBN 0522844421.
- Page, Earle (1963). Truant Surgeon: The Inside Story of Forty Years of Australian Political Life. Angus & Robertson.
