= Adrian David Cheok =

Australian engineer and academic

Adrian David Cheok AM
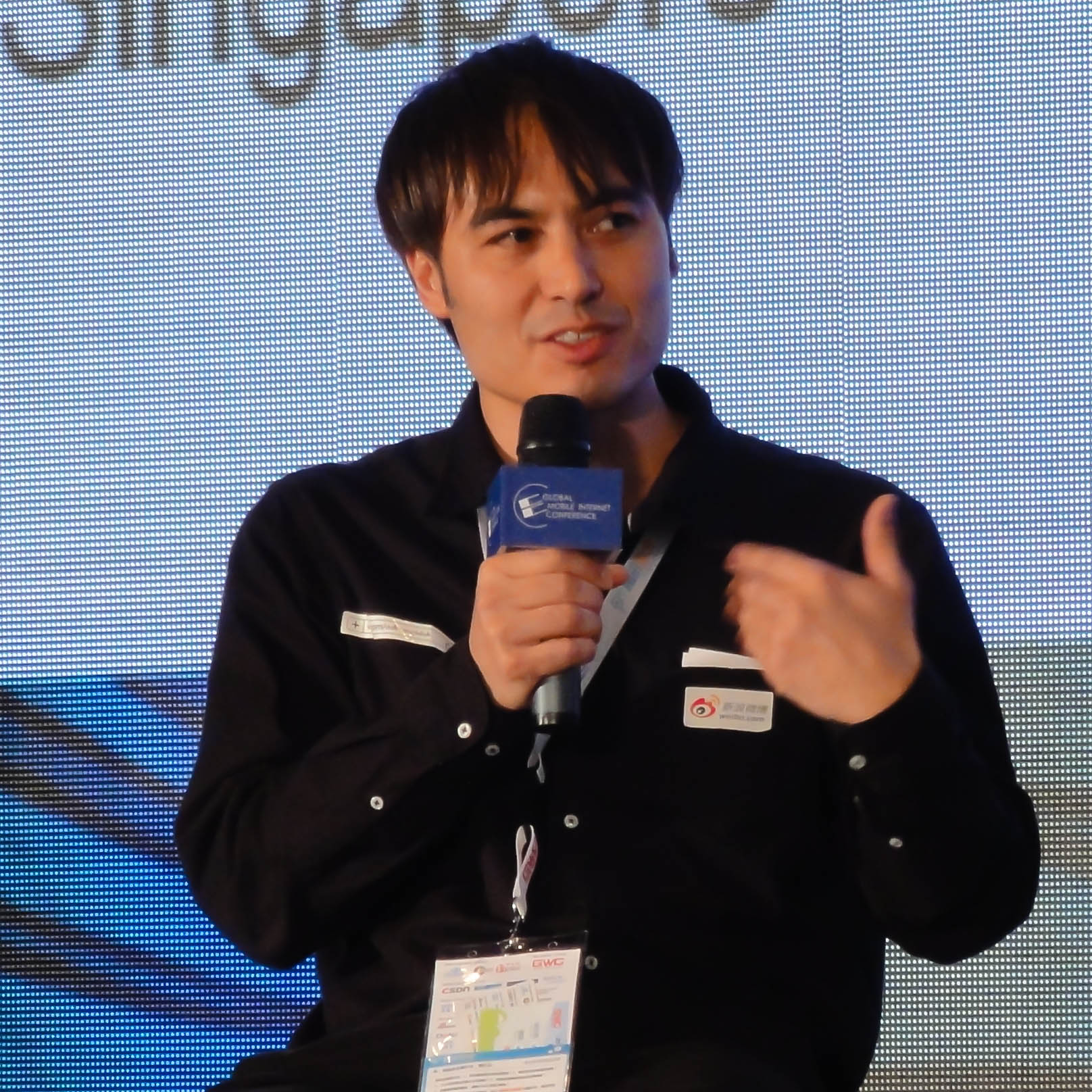
- Cheok in 2011
- Born: 1971 or 1972 (age 54–55)
- Education: University of Adelaide
- Occupations: Academic; professor
- Political party: Conservative National (2019–2020)
- Other political affiliations: United Australia (until 2019)

Adrian David Cheok AM is an Australian electrical engineer and academic. He is a professor at iUniversity in Tokyo, Japan. In the 2019 federal election, he ran to represent the Division of Boothby as a member of the far-right Fraser Anning's Conservative National Party.

== Early life and education ==
Cheok was born and raised in Adelaide, South Australia. He obtained a Bachelor of Engineering (Electrical and Electronic) in 1992, and PhD in Engineering in 1998 from the University of Adelaide.

== Career ==
=== Academic ===
In 2004, Cheok developed Human Pacman, an early augmented reality game. In 2005, he created the Poultry Internet project which used a customised haptic jacket to allow him to remotely hug a chicken.

In 2015, Cheok and his students created Scentee, a device which allowed individuals to transmit fragrances via smartphones with the installed device and aroma cartridges. He has also performed research on taste simulation. In 2016, Cheok and student Emma Yang Zhang co-created Kissenger, a device which allows people to remotely transmit the physical sensation of kissing.

Cheok is a professor at iUniversity in Tokyo, Japan.

Cheok's research, in recent years, has focused on human sexual interaction with robots. Cheok has been criticised by colleagues for equating human-robot marriage with inter-racial and same-sex marriage, and concerns were raised over his professional conduct, specifically the ethical and consent issues of demonstrating cybersexual inventions with young female students.

In 2019, Cheok announced plans to set up an institution called the Nikola Tesla Graduate School, with right-wing Australian politician Fraser Anning as honorary chairman and president. At the time, the school was asking for donations, but did not yet have any physical address, and was not registered with the Tertiary Education Quality and Standards Agency.

=== Conferences ===
Cheok was a general co-chair of David Levy's Love and Sex with Robots conference. The conference presented papers which explored the ethics and practical considerations surrounding sexuality and the field of robotics, specifically sex robots. Its 2015 conference in Malaysia was cancelled by police who declared it illegal and inappropriate for the country's culture, and in 2016 the conference was hosted by Goldsmiths, University of London. In 2020, Cheok and most of the Committee resigned en masse.

In 2017, Cheok provided a keynote speech for the Foundation of Digital Games conference. After the conference the organisers issued a formal statement censuring Cheok for his behaviour after he personally attacked an academic on Twitter when she criticised aspects of his presentation.

Cheok served as chairman of the academic conference Advances in Computer Entertainment, and contributed to its demise in 2018 when members of the conference's committee objected to Cheok appointing David Levy, who has been criticised for his views on the use of child sex robots, to the conference's steering committee without consultation, and adding a "Love and Sex with Robots" strand to the conference. Cheok responded by inviting Steve Bannon to give that year's keynote speech, prompting widespread international criticism from universities. Springer cancelled their involvement due to a low number of papers and concerns over irregularities in the paper submission and reviewing process. When many delegates declined to attend, Cheok cancelled the conference, criticising academia as "a bunch of weak willies".

== Politics ==
Cheok is a supporter of Australian politician Fraser Anning, sharing his strong anti-immigration stance. At the 2019 Australian federal election, he ran as a candidate for Anning's Conservative National Party in the Adelaide division of Boothby, receiving 0.79% of the vote. He was a member of Clive Palmer's United Australia Party, but stood down from the right-wing party after being asked by Palmer to "dumb down" his policies.

== Awards and honours ==
In 2003, Cheok received a Young Scientist Award from the Singapore National Academy of Science. He is a member of the World Technology Network, and was a Young Global Leader for the World Economic Forum. He is a Fellow, Royal Society for the Encouragement of Arts, Manufactures and Commerce. In 2016, he was awarded the Distinguished Alumni Awards by University of Adelaide, in recognition of his achievements and contribution in the field of Computing, Engineering and Multisensory communication. Cheok was recognized with the Albert Nelson Marquis Lifetime Achievement Award in 2018.

In the 2019 Queen's Birthday Honours, he was made a Member of the Order of Australia (AM) for his work in the fields of robotics and artificial intelligence. That led to a formal request by the Australian chapter of the Digital Games Research Association to the Governor-General of Australia, for it to be withdrawn. In response Anning wrote to the governor-general and Queen Elizabeth II in defence of Cheok. The Order of Australia has not been rescinded.
