= 2019 Australian federal election =

- 18 May 2019

All 151 seats in the House of Representatives 76 seats were needed for a majority 40 (of the 76) seats in the Senate
- Opinion polls
- Registered: 16,424,248 ▲4.80%
- Turnout: 15,088,616 (91.89%) (▲0.88 pp)
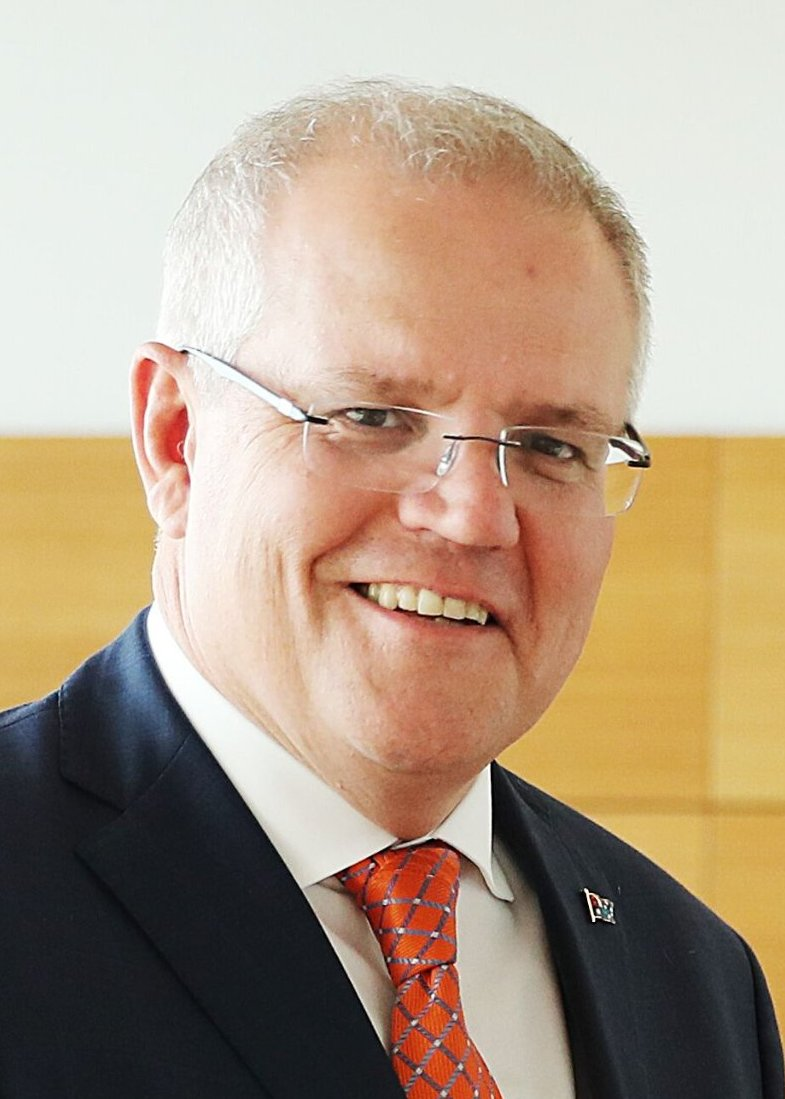

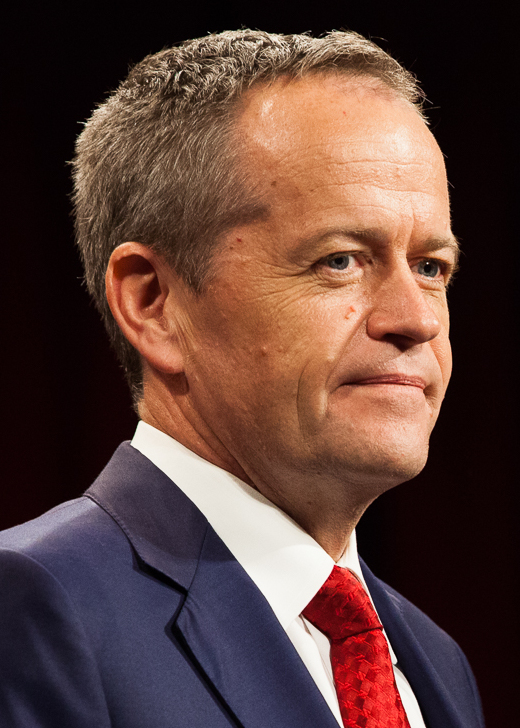

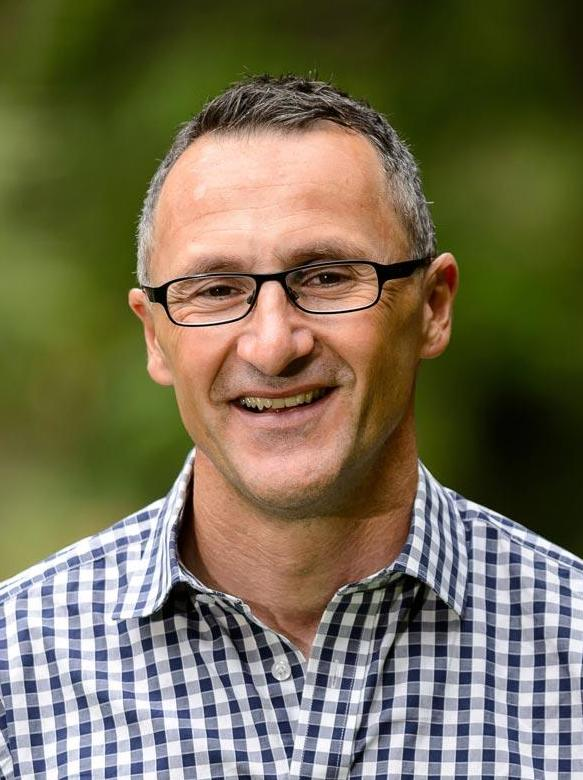

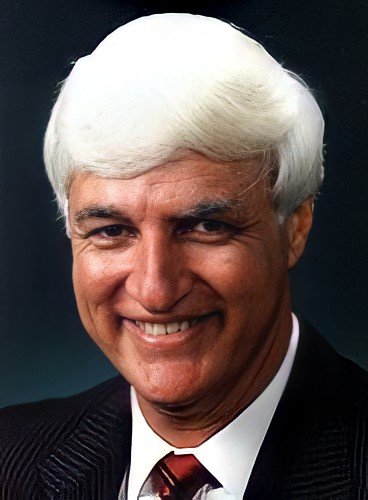

	First party	Second party	Third party
Leader	Scott Morrison	Bill Shorten	Richard Di Natale
Party	Coalition	Labor	Greens
Leader since	24 August 2018	13 October 2013	6 May 2015
Leader's seat	Cook (NSW)	Maribyrnong (Vic.)	Victoria (Senate)
Last election	76 seats, 42.04%	69 seats, 34.73%	1 seat, 10.23%
Seats before	74 (Note: The Liberal Party lost the seat of Wentworth to independent Kerryn Phelps at a by-election in 2018, following the resignation of former prime minister Malcolm Turnbull. The Liberal Party subsequently regained the seat at this election, with Dave Sharma becoming the new member. Also in 2018 Liberal MP for Chisholm Julia Banks resigned from the party and sat on the crossbench as an independent.)	69	1
Seats won	77	68	1
Seat change	▲1	▼1	Steady
Primary vote	5,906,875	4,752,160	1,482,923
Percentage	41.44%	33.34%	10.40%
Swing	▼0.60	▼1.39	▲0.17
TPP	51.53%	48.47%
TPP swing	▲1.17	▼1.17
	Fourth party	Fifth party	Sixth party
			IND
Leader	Bob Katter	No leader	N/A
Party	Katter's Australian	Centre Alliance	Independents
Leader since	5 June 2011	N/A	N/A
Leader's seat	Kennedy (Qld.)	Mayo (SA)	N/A
Last election	1 seat, 0.54%	1 seat, 1.85%	2 seats, 2.81%
Seats before	1	1	5 (Note: On 20 October 2018, Kerryn Phelps won the Liberal-held seat of Wentworth at a by-election.; On 27 November 2018, Julia Banks (Chisholm, Vic) left the Liberal Party to sit as an independent following the party's leadership crisis.)
Seats won	1	1	3
Seat change	Steady	Steady	▲1
Primary vote	69,736	46,931	479,836
Percentage	0.49%	0.33%	3.37%
Swing	▼0.05pp	▼1.52pp	▲0.56
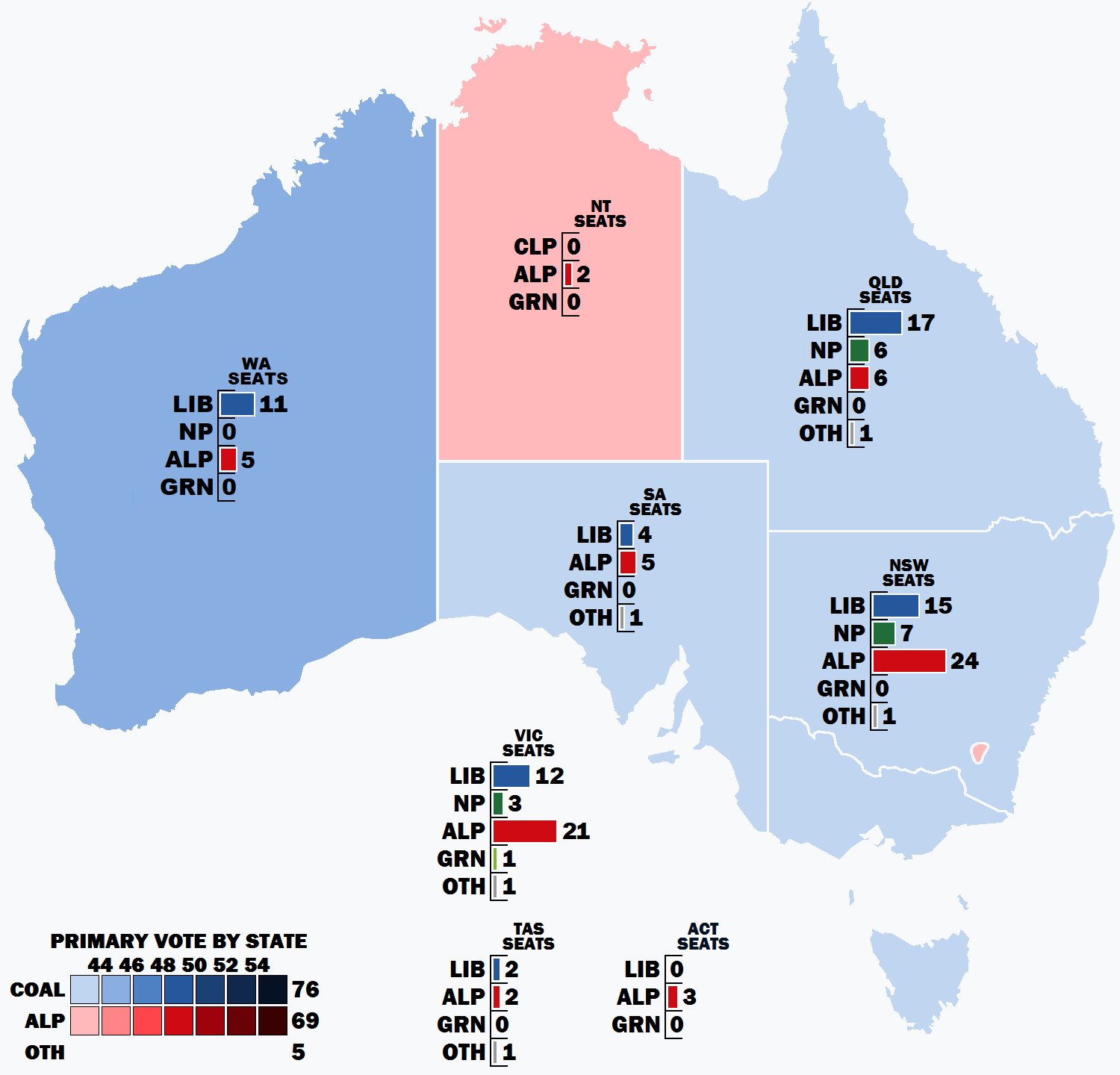
Prime Minister before election
Scott Morrison
Liberal/National coalition
Prime Minister after election
Scott Morrison
Liberal/National coalition

A federal election was held on 18 May 2019 to elect members of the 46th Parliament of Australia. The election had been called following the dissolution of the 45th Parliament as elected at the 2016 double dissolution federal election. All 151 seats in the House of Representatives (lower house) and 40 of the 76 seats in the Senate (upper house) were up for election.

The second-term incumbent minority Liberal/National Coalition government, led by Prime Minister Scott Morrison, won a third three-year term by defeating the opposition Australian Labor Party, led by Opposition Leader Bill Shorten. The Coalition claimed a three-seat majority with 77 seats, Labor finished with 68, whilst the remaining six seats were won by the Australian Greens, Centre Alliance, Katter's Australian Party and three independents.

The electoral system of Australia enforces compulsory voting and uses full-preference instant-runoff voting in single-member seats for the House of Representatives and optional preferential single transferable voting in the Senate. The election was administered by the Australian Electoral Commission.

The result was considered an upset as polling had placed the Coalition consistently behind for almost three years. It was the first time since 2001 that a Federal government in Australia won a third consecutive term in office. The Coalition benefited from a stronger-than-expected showing in Queensland and Tasmania. The Liberal National Party of Queensland won 23 of the state's 30 seats with a statewide primary vote of 43%. Indeed, the net two-seat swing to the LNP in Queensland was enough to allow the Coalition to regain its majority.

On election night, Shorten declared his intention to stand down as leader of his party, but to remain in parliament. The Second Morrison ministry was sworn in on 29 May 2019.

== Background ==
=== Previous election ===
The outcome of the 2016 federal election could not be determined on election night, with too many seats in doubt. After a week of vote counting, neither the incumbent Turnbull government led by Prime Minister Malcolm Turnbull of the Liberal/National Coalition nor the Shorten Opposition led by Opposition Leader Bill Shorten of the Australian Labor Party had won enough seats in the 150-seat House of Representatives to form a majority government.

During the uncertain week following the election, Turnbull negotiated with the crossbench and secured confidence and supply support from Bob Katter and from independents Andrew Wilkie and Cathy McGowan in the event of a hung parliament and resulting minority government. During crossbench negotiations, Turnbull pledged additional staff and resources for crossbenchers, and stated "It is my commitment to work in every way possible to ensure that the crossbenchers have access to all of the information they need and all of the resources they need to be able to play the role they need in this parliament".

On 10 July, eight days after the election took place and following Turnbull's negotiations with the crossbench where he secured sufficient confidence and supply support, Shorten conceded defeat, acknowledging that the incumbent Coalition had enough seats to form either a minority or majority government. Turnbull claimed victory later that day. In the closest federal majority result since the 1961 election, the ABC declared on 11 July that the incumbent Coalition would be able to form a one-seat majority government.

It was the first election result since federation where the post-election opposition won more seats than the post-election government in both of Australia's two most populous states, New South Wales and Victoria.

==== Result ====
In the 150-seat House of Representatives, the one-term incumbent Liberal/National Coalition government suffered a 14-seat swing, reducing it to 76 seats—a bare one-seat majority. With a national three-point two-party swing against the government, the Labor opposition picked up a significant number of previously government-held seats to gain a total of 69 seats. On the crossbench, the Greens, the Nick Xenophon Team, Katter's Australian Party, and independents Wilkie and McGowan won a seat each. On 19 July, the Australian Electoral Commission (AEC) announced a re-count for the Coalition-held but provisionally Labor-won Division of Herbert. At the start of the Herbert re-count, Labor led by eight votes. The AEC announced on 31 July that Labor had won Herbert by 37 votes.

The final outcome in the 76-seat Senate took more than four weeks to determine, despite significant voting changes. Earlier in 2016, legislation changed the Senate voting system from a full-preference single transferable vote with group voting tickets to an optional-preferential single transferable vote. The final Senate result was announced on 4 August: Liberal/National Coalition 30 seats (−3), Labor 26 seats (+1), Greens 9 seats (−1), One Nation 4 seats (+4) and Nick Xenophon Team 3 seats (+2). Derryn Hinch won a seat, while Jacqui Lambie, Liberal Democrat David Leyonhjelm and Family First's Bob Day retained their seats. The number of crossbenchers increased by two to a record 20. The Liberal/National Coalition will require at least nine additional votes to reach a Senate majority, an increase of three. The Liberal and Labor parties agreed to support a motion in the parliament that the first six senators elected in each state would serve a six-year term, while the last six elected would serve a three-year term.

=== Changes in parliamentary composition ===
Since the 2016 election, a number of parliamentarians resigned from their seats, while some with dual citizenship were disqualified by the High Court of Australia in the parliamentary eligibility crisis. However, in the cases of disqualified House of Representatives MPs, most of these were returned in resulting by-elections. Some MPs changed their party affiliation or their independent status.

Changes in parliamentary composition

Seat	Before		Change		After		
Seat	Member	Party	Type	Date	Date	Member	Party
Vic (Senate)	Stephen Conroy	Labor	Resignation	30 September 2016	25 October 2016	Kimberley Kitching	Labor
SA (Senate)	Bob Day	Family First	Resignation, disqualification	1 November 2016	19 April 2017	Lucy Gichuhi	Family First
WA (Senate)	Rod Culleton	One Nation	Departure from party	18 December 2016		Rod Culleton	Independent
WA (Senate)	Rod Culleton	Independent	Disqualification	11 January 2017	27 March 2017	Peter Georgiou	One Nation
SA (Senate)	Cory Bernardi	Liberal	Formation of new party	7 February 2017		Cory Bernardi	Conservatives
SA (Senate)	Lucy Gichuhi	Family First	Refusal to join party merger	3 May 2017		Lucy Gichuhi	Independent
WA (Senate)	Scott Ludlam	Greens	Resignation, disqualification	14 July 2017	10 November 2017	Jordon Steele-John	Greens
Qld (Senate)	Larissa Waters	Greens	Resignation, disqualification	18 July 2017	10 November 2017	Andrew Bartlett	Greens
WA (Senate)	Chris Back	Liberal	Resignation	31 July 2017	16 August 2017	Slade Brockman	Liberal
Qld (Senate)	Malcolm Roberts	One Nation	Disqualification	27 October 2017	10 November 2017	Fraser Anning	One Nation
New England	Barnaby Joyce	National	Disqualification	27 October 2017	2 December 2017	Barnaby Joyce (re-elected)	National
NSW (Senate)	Fiona Nash	National	Disqualification	27 October 2017	22 December 2017	Jim Molan	Liberal
SA (Senate)	Nick Xenophon	Xenophon Team	Resignation	31 October 2017	14 November 2017	Rex Patrick	Xenophon Team
Tas (Senate)	Stephen Parry	Liberal	Resignation, disqualification	2 November 2017	9 February 2018	Richard Colbeck	Liberal
Bennelong	John Alexander	Liberal	Resignation	11 November 2017	16 December 2017	John Alexander (re-elected)	Liberal
Tas (Senate)	Jacqui Lambie	Lambie Network	Resignation, disqualification	14 November 2017	9 February 2018	Steve Martin	Independent
SA (Senate)	Skye Kakoschke-Moore	Xenophon Team	Resignation, disqualification	22 November 2017	16 February 2018	Tim Storer	Independent
Qld (Senate)	Fraser Anning	One Nation	Departure from party	15 January 2018		Fraser Anning	Independent
NSW (Senate)	Sam Dastyari	Labor	Resignation	25 January 2018	14 February 2018	Kristina Keneally	Labor
Batman	David Feeney	Labor	Resignation	1 February 2018	17 March 2018	Ged Kearney	Labor
SA (Senate)	Lucy Gichuhi	Independent	Party membership	2 February 2018		Lucy Gichuhi	Liberal
Qld (Senate)	George Brandis	LNP	Resignation	8 February 2018	21 March 2018	Amanda Stoker	LNP
ACT (Senate)	Katy Gallagher	Labor	Disqualification	9 May 2018	23 May 2018	David Smith	Labor
Perth	Tim Hammond	Labor	Resignation	10 May 2018	28 July 2018	Patrick Gorman	Labor
Braddon	Justine Keay	Labor	Resignation	10 May 2018	28 July 2018	Justine Keay (re-elected)	Labor
Fremantle	Josh Wilson	Labor	Resignation	10 May 2018	28 July 2018	Josh Wilson (re-elected)	Labor
Longman	Susan Lamb	Labor	Resignation	10 May 2018	28 July 2018	Susan Lamb (re-elected)	Labor
Mayo	Rebekha Sharkie	Centre Alliance	Resignation	11 May 2018	28 July 2018	Rebekha Sharkie (re-elected)	Centre Alliance
Tas (Senate)	Steve Martin	Independent	Party membership	28 May 2018		Steve Martin	National
Qld (Senate)	Fraser Anning	Independent	Party membership	4 June 2018		Fraser Anning	Katter's Australian
NSW (Senate)	Brian Burston	One Nation	Departure from party	14 June 2018		Brian Burston	Independent
NSW (Senate)	Brian Burston	Independent	Party membership	18 June 2018		Brian Burston	United Australia
NSW (Senate)	Lee Rhiannon	Greens	Resignation	15 August 2018		Mehreen Faruqi	Greens
Qld (Senate)	Andrew Bartlett	Greens	Resignation	27 August 2018	6 September 2018	Larissa Waters	Greens
Wentworth	Malcolm Turnbull	Liberal	Resignation	31 August 2018	20 October 2018	Kerryn Phelps	Independent
Qld (Senate)	Fraser Anning	Katter's Australian	Departure from party	25 October 2018		Fraser Anning	Independent
Chisholm	Julia Banks	Liberal	Departure from party	27 November 2018		Julia Banks	Independent
Tas (Senate)	David Bushby	Liberal	Resignation	21 January 2019	6 March 2019	Wendy Askew	Liberal
Vic (Senate)	Jacinta Collins	Labor	Resignation	15 February 2019	6 March 2019	Raff Ciccone	Labor
NSW (Senate)	David Leyonhjelm	Liberal Democrats	Resignation	1 March 2019	20 March 2019	Duncan Spender	Liberal Democrats
Qld (Senate)	Fraser Anning	Independent	Formation of new party	4 April 2019		Fraser Anning	Conservative National Party
ACT (Senate)	David Smith	Labor	Resignation	11 April 2019		vacant	
SA (Senate)	Cory Bernardi	Conservatives	Party deregistration	24 June 2019 (Note: The party deregistration was after the 2019 election but before the start of the 46th Parliament)		Cory Bernardi	Independent

Following the parliamentary eligibility crisis, the AEC's form for nomination was updated to ask detailed questions on whether candidates are disqualified under Section 44 of the Constitution of Australia. Three Victorian Liberal candidates had to withdraw based on section 44 issues.

=== Change of Prime Minister ===
Following the Liberal Party leadership spill on 24 August 2018, Malcolm Turnbull was replaced as prime minister by Scott Morrison. Turnbull resigned from parliament on 31 August, triggering a by-election in his former seat of Wentworth. The by-election was won by independent Kerryn Phelps. This, combined with National MP Kevin Hogan's move to the crossbench and the resignation of MP Julia Banks from the Liberal Party, reduced the government to 73 seats going into the election; a net three-seat deficit.

Further dissatisfaction within the Liberal Party saw a number of centrist and economically-liberal candidates announce that they would nominate as independents in wealthy electorates, with a specific focus on "addressing climate change".

== Candidates ==
The nomination of candidates closed on 23 April 2019.

There were 1,514 candidates in total (1,056 for the House of Representatives and 458 for the Senate).

== State of electorates ==
After effects of boundary redistributions for the next election, and the 2018 Wentworth by-election, the Mackerras pendulum had the Liberal/National Coalition government on 73 of 151 seats with the Labor opposition on 72 seats and a crossbench of six seats.

Assuming a theoretical nationwide uniform swing, the Labor opposition needed at least 50.7% of the two-party vote (at least a 1.1-point two-party swing) to win 76 seats and majority government. The incumbent Coalition government no longer held a majority, and required at least 51.1% of the two-party vote (at least a 0.7-point two-party swing) to regain it.

The key marginal seats were as follows:

Marginal Coalition seats
Capricornia (Qld)	Michelle Landry	LNP	50.63
Forde (Qld)	Bert van Manen	LNP	50.63
Gilmore (NSW)	Ann Sudmalis (Note: Members with names in italics retired at the 2019 election.)	LIB	50.73
Flynn (Qld)	Ken O'Dowd	LNP	51.04
^^^ Opposition wins majority on a uniform swing ^^^
Robertson (NSW)	Lucy Wicks	LIB	51.14
Banks (NSW)	David Coleman	LIB	51.44
Petrie (Qld)	Luke Howarth	LNP	51.65
Dickson (Qld)	Peter Dutton	LNP	51.69
Hasluck (WA)	Ken Wyatt	LIB	52.05
Page (NSW)	Kevin Hogan	NAT	52.30
Boothby (SA)	Nicolle Flint	LIB	52.71
Chisholm (Vic)	Julia Banks (IND) (Note: Julia Banks was elected as the Liberal member for Chisholm in 2016, but resigned from the party in November 2018 and sat as an independent. She retired from Chisholm to contest the seat of Flinders.)	LIB	52.91
La Trobe (Vic)	Jason Wood	LIB	53.22
Dawson (Qld)	George Christensen	LNP	53.37
Bonner (Qld)	Ross Vasta	LNP	53.39
Swan (WA)	Steve Irons	LIB	53.59
Pearce (WA)	Christian Porter	LIB	53.63
Leichhardt (Qld)	Warren Entsch	LNP	53.95
Casey (Vic)	Tony Smith	LIB	54.54
Cowper (NSW)	Luke Hartsuyker	NAT v IND	54.56
Reid (NSW)	Craig Laundy	LIB	54.69
Sturt (SA)	Christopher Pyne	LIB	55.39

Marginal Labor seats
Herbert (Qld)	Cathy O'Toole	ALP	50.02
Corangamite (Vic)	Sarah Henderson (LIB) (Note: Although the seats of Corangamite and Dunkley were Liberal wins at the previous election, the redistribution in Victoria changed them to notionally marginal Labor seats.)	ALP	50.03
Cooper (Vic)	Ged Kearney	ALP	50.6 v GRN (Note: Margin as of the previous by-election (which may apply to older boundaries).)
Cowan (WA)	Anne Aly	ALP	50.68
^^^ Government regains majority on a uniform swing ^^^
Longman (Qld)	Susan Lamb	ALP	50.79
Dunkley (Vic)	Chris Crewther (LIB)	ALP	51.03
Lindsay (NSW)	Emma Husar	ALP	51.11
Macnamara (Vic)	Michael Danby	ALP	51.21
Griffith (Qld)	Terri Butler	ALP	51.43
Braddon (Tas)	Justine Keay	ALP	51.73
Macquarie (NSW)	Susan Templeman	ALP	52.19
Eden-Monaro (NSW)	Mike Kelly	ALP	52.93
Isaacs (Vic)	Mark Dreyfus	ALP	52.98
Perth (WA)	Patrick Gorman	ALP	53.33
Lyons (Tas)	Brian Mitchell	ALP	53.83
Bendigo (Vic)	Lisa Chesters	ALP	53.87
Richmond (NSW)	Justine Elliot	ALP	53.96
Hotham (Vic)	Clare O'Neil	ALP	54.21
Dobell (NSW)	Emma McBride	ALP	54.81
Wills (Vic)	Peter Khalil	ALP	54.9 v GRN
Bass (Tas)	Ross Hart	ALP	55.42
Jagajaga (Vic)	Jenny Macklin	ALP	55.60
Lilley (Qld)	Wayne Swan	ALP	55.68
Marginal crossbench seats
Wentworth (NSW)	Kerryn Phelps	IND	51.2 v LIB
Indi (Vic)	Cathy McGowan	IND	54.1 v LIB
Mayo (SA)	Rebekha Sharkie	CA	55.5 v LIB

== Retiring members ==
Members of Parliament and Senators who chose not to renominate for the 2019 election are as follows:

=== Labor ===
- Gai Brodtmann MP (Canberra, ACT) – announced retirement 13 August 2018
- Michael Danby MP (Melbourne Ports, Vic) – announced retirement 5 July 2018
- Kate Ellis MP (Adelaide, SA) – announced retirement 9 March 2017
- Emma Husar MP (Lindsay, NSW) – announced retirement 11 April 2019
- Jenny Macklin MP (Jagajaga, Vic) – announced retirement 6 July 2018
- Wayne Swan MP (Lilley, Qld) – announced retirement 10 February 2018
- Senator Doug Cameron (NSW) – announced retirement 24 July 2016
- Senator Claire Moore (Qld) – announced retirement 31 July 2018

=== Liberal ===
- Julie Bishop MP (Curtin, WA) – announced retirement 21 February 2019
- Steven Ciobo MP (Moncrieff, Qld) – announced retirement 1 March 2019
- Michael Keenan MP (Stirling, WA) – announced retirement 25 January 2019
- Craig Laundy MP (Reid, NSW) – announced retirement 15 March 2019
- Kelly O'Dwyer MP (Higgins, Vic) – announced retirement 19 January 2019
- Jane Prentice MP (Ryan, Qld) – lost preselection 12 May 2018
- Christopher Pyne MP (Sturt, SA) – announced retirement 2 March 2019
- Ann Sudmalis MP (Gilmore, NSW) – announced retirement 17 September 2018

=== Nationals ===
- Andrew Broad MP (Mallee, Vic) – announced retirement 18 December 2018
- Luke Hartsuyker MP (Cowper, NSW) – announced retirement 8 August 2018
- Senator Barry O'Sullivan (Qld) – lost preselection 6 July 2018
- Senator Nigel Scullion (NT) – announced retirement 26 January 2019
- Senator John Williams (NSW) – announced retirement 31 May 2016

=== Independent ===
- Cathy McGowan MP (Indi, Vic) – announced retirement 14 January 2019
- Senator Tim Storer (SA) – announced retirement 17 April 2019

== Opinion polls ==
=== Graphical summary ===
Two-party-preferred vote.

Primary vote.

Aggregate data of voting intention from all opinion polling since the last election. Local regression trends for each party are shown as solid lines.

=== Assessment of polling accuracy ===
The result of the 2019 election was in stark contrast to the aggregation of opinion polls conducted over the period of the 45th parliament and the 2019 election campaign. Apart from a few outliers, Labor had been ahead for the entire period, by as much as 56% on a two-party-preferred basis after Scott Morrison took over the leadership of the Liberal Party in August 2018—although during the campaign, Labor's two-party estimate was between 51 and 52%.

During the ABC's election coverage, election analyst Antony Green stated, "at the moment, on these figures, it's a bit of a spectacular failure of opinion polling", with the election results essentially a mirror image of the polls with the Coalition's two-party vote at around 51%.

The former director of Newspoll, Martin O'Shannessy, cited changes in demographics and telephone habits which have changed the nature of polling from calling random samples of landlines to calling random mobile numbers and automated "robocalls"—with the ensuing drop in response rates resulting in lower quality data due to smaller samples and bias in the sample due to who chooses to respond.

Several analysts and statisticians found the lack of variance of the two-party preferred estimates concerning—truly random poll sampling would see the results "bounce around" within each poll's margin of error, but the differences between figures in the final few weeks of the campaign were so consistently small as to be highly improbable to happen under random chance. Some analysts suspected the phenomenon of "herding" had occurred—as polling companies attempted to adjust for bias, they had "massaged" their results to be similar to other polls, resulting in an artificial closeness. Modelling performed after the election suggested that "herding" was the more likely explanation for the polling error as compared to skewed sampling.

== Election date ==
An election for the House of Representatives can be called at any time during the maximum three-year parliamentary term. The term of the House of Representatives starts on the first sitting day of the House following its election, which in the case of the 45th Parliament was 30 August 2016. The House therefore would expire on 29 August 2019, unless it were dissolved earlier. In this case, the House of Representatives was dissolved on 11 April and an election called for 18 May 2019. This occurred after Prime Minister Scott Morrison visited the Governor-General advising him to prorogue Parliament and dissolve the House of Representatives. The Governor-General accepted Morrison's recommendations, as is the custom in Australia's Westminster system of government.

The Constitution of Australia does not require simultaneous elections for the Senate and the House of Representatives, but it has long been preferred that elections for the two houses take place simultaneously. The most recent House-only election took place in 1972, and the most recent Senate-only election took place in 1970. However, the writs for a half-Senate election could not be issued earlier than 1 July 2018. Section 13 of the Constitution requires that the election of senators must take place within one year before the terms expire for half-Senate elections. Since the previous election was a double dissolution, half of the senators were allocated three-year terms that end on 30 June 2019, while the other half were allocated six-year terms that end on 30 June 2022. Senators from the territories serve terms timed with House elections. Since campaigns are for a minimum of 33 days, the earliest possible date for a simultaneous House/half-Senate election was 4 August 2018. The latest that a half-Senate election could be held must allow time for the votes to be counted and the writs to be returned before the newly elected senators take office on 1 July 2019. This took over a month in 2016, so practically the last possible date for a half-Senate election to take place before the three-year terms expire is 18 May 2019.

An election for the House of Representatives needed to be held on or before 2 November 2019. The latest date for the election is calculated from the Constitution and the Commonwealth Electoral Act 1918 (CEA). Section 28 of the Constitution provides that a term of the House of Representatives expires three years from the first sitting of the House, unless dissolved earlier. The last federal election was held on 2 July 2016. The 45th Parliament opened on 30 August 2016 and its term would expire on 29 August 2019. Writs for election can be issued up to ten days after a dissolution or expiry of the House. Up to 27 days can be allowed for nominations, and the actual election can be set for a maximum of 31 days after close of nominations, resulting in the latest election date for the House of Representatives of Saturday, 2 November 2019.

A double dissolution cannot take place within six months before the date of the expiry of the House of Representatives. That meant that any double dissolution of the 45th Parliament had to have been granted by 28 February 2019. Allowing for the same stages indicated above, the last possible date for a double dissolution election would have been 4 May 2019. This could only have occurred if a bill that had passed the House of Representatives was rejected by the Senate twice, at least three months apart.

=== Constitutional and legal provisions ===
The constitutional and legal provisions which impact on the choice of election dates include:

- Section 12 of the Constitution says: "The Governor of any State may cause writs to be issued for the election of Senators for that State".
- Section 13 of the Constitution provides that the election of senators shall be held in the period of twelve months before the places become vacant.
- Section 28 of the Constitution says: "Every House of Representatives shall continue for three years from the first sitting of the House, and no longer, but may be sooner dissolved by the Governor-General." Since the 45th Parliament of Australia opened on 30 August 2016, it will expire on 29 August 2019.
- Section 32 of the Constitution says: "The writs shall be issued within ten days from the expiry of a House of Representatives or from the proclamation of a dissolution thereof." Ten days after 29 August 2019 is 8 September 2019.
- Section 156 (1) of the CEA says: "The date fixed for the nomination of the candidates shall not be less than 10 days nor more than 27 days after the date of the writ". Twenty-seven days after 8 September 2019 is 5 October 2019.
- Section 157 of the CEA says: "The date fixed for the polling shall not be less than 23 days nor more than 31 days after the date of nomination". Thirty-one days after 5 October 2019 is 5 November 2019, a Tuesday.
- Section 158 of the CEA says: "The day fixed for the polling shall be a Saturday". The Saturday before 5 November 2019 is 2 November 2019. This is therefore the latest possible date for the lower house election.

== Election timeline ==
On 11 April 2019, the office of the Governor-General released documents relating to the calling of the election. The documents set out a timeline of key dates for the election.

- 11 April – 8:29 am: Prorogation of the 45th Parliament
- 11 April – 8:30 am: Dissolution of the House of Representatives
- 11 April – Issue of writs
- 18 April – Close of electoral rolls. At this time, enrolment is at 96.8% of the eligible population.
- 23 April – Close of candidate nominations
- 24 April – Declaration of nominations
- 29 April – Early voting commences
- 18 May – Polling day; commencement of terms for territory senators
- 28 June – Return of writs (last day)
- 1 July – Commencement of terms for state senators

The election period included three national public holidays: Good Friday (19 April), Easter Monday (22 April) and Anzac Day (25 April), as well as May Day and Labour Day in Northern Territory and Queensland, respectively, both falling on 6 May.

== Redistributions ==
Since the previous election in 2016, there was a reapportionment of seats of the House of Representatives, as well as three scheduled redistributions of electoral boundaries. On 31 August 2017, the Australian Electoral Commission announced a reapportionment of seats based on calculation of each state and territory's entitlement determination: Victoria gained one seat to 38, the Australian Capital Territory gained a seat to 3, and South Australia lost one seat to 10. The total number of members of the House of Representatives increased from 150 to 151.

Following the reapportionment, which applied to the 2019 election, the allocation of seats was:

State	Seats	Change
New South Wales	47	Steady
Victoria	38	▲1
Queensland	30	Steady
Western Australia	16	Steady
South Australia	10	▼1
Tasmania	5	Steady
Australian Capital Territory	3	▲1
Northern Territory	2	Steady
Total	151	▲1

=== Northern Territory ===
On 7 December 2016, the Electoral Commission for the Northern Territory announced the results of its deliberations into the boundaries of Lingiari and Solomon, the two federal electoral divisions in the Northern Territory. New boundaries gazetted from 7 February 2017 saw the remainder of the Litchfield Municipality and parts of Palmerston (the suburbs of Farrar, Johnston, Mitchell, Zuccoli and part of Yarrawonga) transferred from Solomon to Lingiari.

=== Tasmania ===
A scheduled redistribution began in Tasmania on 1 September 2016, with the determinations announced on 27 September 2017. In addition to boundary changes, the Division of Denison was renamed the Division of Clark after Andrew Inglis Clark.

=== Queensland ===
A scheduled redistribution began in Queensland on 6 January 2017, and was finalised on 27 March 2018. Changes were made to the boundaries of 18 of Queensland's 30 electoral divisions, and no division names were changed.

=== Australian Capital Territory ===
A redistribution of federal electoral divisions in the Australian Capital Territory commenced on 4 September 2017, due to changes in the territory's representation entitlement. The AEC released a proposed redistribution on 6 April 2018, and the final determination on 3 July 2018. The redistribution resulted in the creation of a third ACT electoral division named Bean (notionally fairly safe Labor), after historian Charles Bean.

=== Victoria ===
A redistribution of federal electoral divisions in Victoria commenced on 4 September 2017, due to changes in the state's representation entitlement. The determinations were announced on 20 June 2018, and created a 38th electoral division named Fraser (notionally safe Labor), named after former prime minister Malcolm Fraser.

The commission also renamed several divisions: Batman to Cooper (after William Cooper), McMillan to Monash (after Sir John Monash), Melbourne Ports to Macnamara (after Dame Jean Macnamara) and Murray to Nicholls (after Sir Douglas and Lady Nicholls). A proposal to rename Corangamite to Cox (after swimming instructor May Cox) did not proceed.

The Coalition notionally lost the seats of Corangamite and Dunkley to Labor in the redistribution.

=== South Australia ===
A South Australian seat was abolished due to population changes having occurred since the state's last redistribution in 2011. Although South Australia's population was still increasing, faster increases in other states saw a reduction in South Australia's representation from 11 to 10 seats in the 151-seat House of Representatives. This was the third time South Australia had lost a seat since the 1984 enlargement of the parliament, with Hawker abolished in 1993 and Bonython in 2004. South Australia is the least-populated state where the current number of seats can decrease, as Tasmania's current representation is the minimum guaranteed by the Constitution.

A redistribution of federal electoral divisions in South Australia commenced on 4 September 2017, due to changes in the state's representation entitlement. The proposed redistribution report was released on 13 April 2018, and the final determination on 26 June 2018. The commission abolished the division of Port Adelaide. The hybrid urban-rural seat of Wakefield became the entirely urban seat of Spence, after Catherine Helen Spence. The more rural portions of Wakefield transferred to Grey and Barker.

== Newspaper endorsements ==
The Sunday and daily editions of Australian newspapers traditionally provide editorial endorsement for parties contending both federal and state elections. Alternative newspapers have in recent times also provided backing for minor parties.

=== Sunday editions ===
Newspaper	Endorsement
The Sunday Age	No endorsement
Sunday Herald Sun	Coalition
Sunday Mail (Adelaide)	Coalition
The Sunday Mail (Brisbane)	Coalition
The Sunday Telegraph	Coalition
The Sunday Times	No endorsement
The Sun-Herald	No endorsement

All four newspapers published by News Corp Australia (Melbourne's Sunday Herald Sun, Adelaide's Sunday Mail, Brisbane's The Sunday Mail and Sydney's The Sunday Telegraph) endorsed the Coalition. The Sunday Telegraph compared the major parties as a choice between Labor, which "seeks to present an agenda for social change, a generational correction for people doing it tough: pensioners, the unemployed, the working poor" and a Coalition "government that presents itself as being responsible in its spending, determined to return the budget to the black, eliminate waste and take a forward but steady approach to the broader social issues, such as climate change", ultimately describing Morrison a "safer pair of hands".

Both the Nine Publishing newspapers (Melbourne's The Sunday Age and Sydney's The Sun-Herald) stopped short of endorsing a party, with The Sunday Age calling for bipartisan action on climate change. The Sun-Herald praised Morrison as "the former advertising executive has come into his own, appearing more sure-footed and on message than in the early days of his as leader" but warned that "his single-focus strategy needs some enhancement if he has a chance of pulling off victory", while contrasting it with Labor which has "overwhelmed us with its vision and plans. The party presents itself as a viable alternative government, with bold policy announcements across a variety of sectors, but they carry some risk for the disadvantage they may cause to some sections of the electorate. It runs the risk of hubris should reality not conform with voter expectations".

Seven West Media's newspaper (Perth's The Sunday Times) also made no endorsement, but urged readers not to give the balance of power to "micro parties with wacky, divisive and extreme agendas".

=== Daily editions ===
Newspaper	Endorsement
The Advertiser	Coalition
The Age	Labor
The Australian	Coalition
The Australian Financial Review	Coalition
The Canberra Times	No endorsement
The Courier-Mail	Coalition
The Daily Telegraph	Coalition
The Guardian Australia	Labor
The Guardian Australia	The Greens
Herald Sun	Coalition
The Mercury	No endorsement
NT News	Labor
The Sydney Morning Herald	Labor
The West Australian	Coalition

The majority of News Corp Australia's daily mastheads – The Australian, Sydney's The Daily Telegraph, Melbourne's Herald Sun, Brisbane's The Courier-Mail, Adelaide's The Advertiser and the Geelong Advertiser – endorsed the Coalition. The Australian wrote that "Mr Morrison’s plan errs on the side of being safe but deliverable; his policies, consistent with traditional values, do not unduly raise expectations as Mr Shorten has done". Hobart's The Mercury stopped short of endorsing a party, remarking that with "polls indicating that a hung Parliament remains a possible scenario ... having [Independent candidate for Clark, Andrew] Wilkie advocating for Tasmania in Canberra would not be a terrible outcome". In Darwin, the NT News endorsed Labor, arguing the Morrison government had "shown little to no interest" in Aboriginal affairs, an issue "which seriously threatens the future prosperity of the Northern Territory and Australia".

Two of Nine Publishing's mastheads – The Sydney Morning Herald and Melbourne's The Age endorsed Labor. The Sydney Morning Herald called for voters to bring an end to the "cycle of instability". It emphasised Shorten's "united team that looks like it will stick together", and contrasted this with the "blood feuds" within the Coalition cabinet, stating that "the ALP has used its time in the wilderness of opposition to sort out its factional differences and produce an unusually detailed agreed program". It expressed doubts with some aspects of Labor's economic policy, warning that "with the economy facing headwinds, people want solid, sensible government – not a revolution." It concluded that if Labor could overcome economic challenges and deliver "three years of normal government... it will be better than a continuation of instability under the Coalition". While critical of its stance on climate change and energy policy, its broadsheet The Australian Financial Review endorsed the Coalition, arguing the party "does at least grasp that Australia needs a growth policy in order to lift incomes and sustainably pay for the services government provides".

The Guardian Australia also endorsed Labor, arguing that "the climate emergency is the most pressing issue of our time" and that "the Coalition appears deaf to the rising clamour from the electorate...[while] it clings to an obviously deficient emissions reduction target". Concluding that "the Coalition has neither credible policies nor a competent team", it finds that "Labor is the only party with a credible climate policy and a chance of forming government", but also giving qualified support to The Greens as its "climate policy is more ambitious than Labor’s and its tax and spending policies more redistributive". It also wrote positively of "credible independent candidates who could make positive contributions in the parliament".

In Perth, the Seven West Media-owned The West Australian endorsed the Coalition as having "proved they will listen to Western Australia with their historic shakeup of the GST", and commending the Western Australian Liberal Party for "a proven track record of being powerful advocates for [the] state". The Canberra Times provided no endorsement, but concluded that the choice between the two major parties was "for changes that may benefit [Canberrans] personally" or "for change that has the potential to benefit those less fortunate than they are".

== Results ==
=== House of Representatives ===
Government (77) Coalition Liberal (44) Liberal National (23) (Note: 17 Liberal National Party of Queensland (LNP) MPs sat in the Liberals party room and 6 sat in the Nationals party room) National (10) Opposition (68) Labor (68) Crossbench (6) Greens (1) KAP (1) Centre Alliance (1) Independent (3) (Note: Independent MPs: Andrew Wilkie (Clark), Helen Haines (Indi), Zali Steggall (Warringah))

House of Representatives (IRV) – Turnout 91.89% (CV)
Party	Votes	%	Swing (pp)	Seats	Change (seats)
Liberal/National Coalition					
Liberal Party of Australia	3,989,404	27.99	−0.68	44	▼1
Liberal National Party (Qld)	1,236,401	8.67	+0.15	23	▲2
National Party of Australia	642,233	4.51	−0.10	10	Steady
Country Liberal Party (NT)	38,837	0.27	+0.03	0	Steady
Coalition total	5,906,875	41.44	−0.60	77	▲1
Australian Labor Party	4,752,160	33.34	−1.39	68	▼1
Australian Greens	1,482,923	10.40	+0.17	1	Steady
Katter's Australian Party	69,736	0.49	−0.05	1	Steady
Centre Alliance	46,931	0.33	−1.52	1	Steady
Independent	479,836	3.37	+0.56	3 (Note: The independent members were Andrew Wilkie (Clark, Tas), Helen Haines (Indi, Vic) and Zali Steggall (Warringah, NSW).)	▲1
Other	1,514,932	10.63	+2.84		
Total	14,253,393	100.00	–	151	▲1
Two-party-preferred vote
Liberal/National Coalition	7,344,813	51.53	+1.17		
Labor	6,908,580	48.47	−1.17		
Invalid/blank votes	835,223	5.54	+0.49		
Registered voters/turnout	16,419,543	91.89			
Source: AEC Tally Room

=== Senate ===
2019 Australian Senate Results

Government (35) Coalition Liberal (26) Liberal National (6) (Note: Four Liberal National Party of Queensland (LNP) senators sat in the Liberals party room, while two senators sat in the Nationals party room.) National (2) Country Liberal (1) (Note: Sat in the Nationals party room.) Opposition (26) Labor (26) Crossbench (15) Greens (9) Centre Alliance (2) One Nation (2) Lambie Network (1) Australian Conservatives (1) (Note: Cory Bernardi had resigned from the Liberal Party in February 2017 to form a separate party, the Australian Conservatives.)

Out of 40 Senate seats up for election, the Coalition won 19, while Labor won 13 seats. The Greens won 6 seats, while the only other minor party candidates elected were former senator Malcolm Roberts for One Nation in Queensland, and Jacqui Lambie (JLN) in Tasmania. The Senate crossbench became substantially smaller, with incumbent senators Derryn Hinch, Duncan Spender, Peter Georgiou, Brian Burston, and Fraser Anning, as well as former parliamentarians Clive Palmer and Skye Kakoschke-Moore, failing in their bids to win Senate seats.

Senate (STV) – Turnout 92.48% (CV)
Party	Votes	%	±	Seats			
Party	Votes	%	±	Seats won	Not up	New total	Seat change
Liberal/National Coalition							
Liberal/National joint ticket	3,152,483	21.59	+1.57	6	6	12	▲2
Liberal	1,204,039	8.24	+0.53	9	7	16 (Note: Cory Bernardi had resigned from the Liberal Party in February 2017 to form a separate party, the Australian Conservatives.) (Note: Lucy Gichuhi resigned from Family First and joined the Liberal Party.)	▲2
Liberal National (Qld)	1,128,730	7.73	+0.79	3	3	6	▲1
Country Liberal (NT)	38,513	0.26	−0.00	1	0	1	Steady
National	24,377	0.17	−0.08	0	0	0	Steady
Coalition total	5,548,142	37.99	+2.80	19	16	35	▲5
Labor (Note: Including Country Labor Party in New South Wales.)	4,204,313	28.79	−1.01	13	13	26	Steady
Greens	1,488,427	10.19	+1.54	6	3	9	Steady
One Nation	788,203	5.40	+1.12	1	1	2	▼2
Liberal Democrats	169,735	1.16	−1.00	0	0	0	▼1
Justice	105,459	0.72	−1.20	0	0	0	▼1
Conservatives	102,769	0.70	+0.70	0	1	1 (Note: Lucy Gichuhi resigned from Family First and joined the Liberal Party.)	Steady
Lambie Network	31,383	0.21	−0.28	1	0	1	Steady
Centre Alliance	28,416	0.19	−3.10	0	2	2	▼1
Other	2,138,078	15.6	+2.56				
Total	14,604,925	100.00	–	40	36	76	
Invalid/blank votes	579,160	3.81	−0.13				
Registered voters/turnout	16,419,543	92.48	+0.55				
Source: AEC Tally Room

== Seats changing hands ==
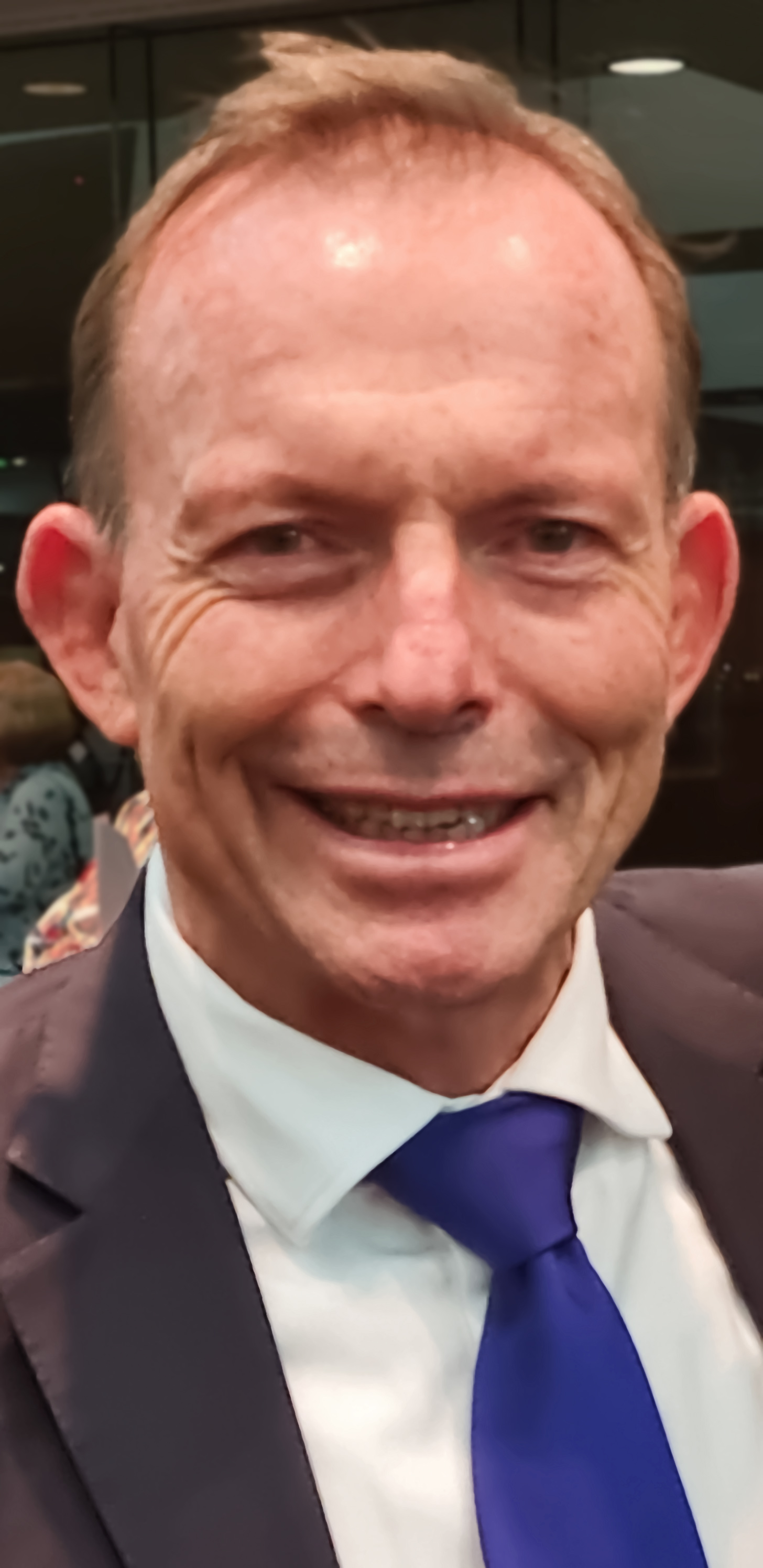
Former prime minister Tony Abbott lost his seat at the 2019 election after 25 years as Member for Warringah

Members in italics did not re-contest their House of Representatives seats at this election.

Seat	2016			Notional margin (Note: For seats that werre affected by the redistribution the Australian Electoral Commission calculated "notional" margins for the redistributed divisions by modelling the outcome of the previous election as if the new boundaries had been in place.)	Swing	2019		
Seat	Party	Member	Margin	Notional margin	Swing	Margin	Member	Party
Bass, TAS	Labor	Ross Hart	6.09	5.42	5.83	0.41	Bridget Archer	Liberal
Braddon, TAS	Labor	Justine Keay	2.31	1.73	4.82	3.09	Gavin Pearce	Liberal
Chisholm, VIC	Independent	Julia Banks (Note: Julia Banks was elected as a Liberal in 2016, but became an independent in 2018. She unsuccessfully contested the seat of Flinders.)	1.24		–2.34	0.57	Gladys Liu	Liberal
Corangamite, VIC	Liberal	Sarah Henderson	3.13	−0.03 (Note: As a result of the 2018 boundary redistribution, the Victorian Liberal-held seats of Corangamite and Dunkley became notionally marginal Labor seats.)	1.04	1.07	Libby Coker	Labor
Dunkley, VIC	Liberal	Chris Crewther	1.43	−1.03	1.71	2.74	Peta Murphy	Labor
Gilmore, NSW	Liberal	Ann Sudmalis	0.73		3.34	2.61	Fiona Phillips	Labor
Herbert, QLD	Labor	Cathy O'Toole	0.02		8.38	8.36	Phillip Thompson	Liberal National
Lindsay, NSW	Labor	Emma Husar	1.11		6.15	5.04	Melissa McIntosh	Liberal
Longman, QLD	Labor	Susan Lamb	0.79		4.07	3.28	Terry Young	Liberal National
Warringah, NSW	Liberal	Tony Abbott	11.55		N/A	7.24	Zali Steggall	Independent
Wentworth, NSW	Liberal	Malcolm Turnbull	17.75		−16.44	1.31	Dave Sharma	Liberal
Wentworth, NSW	Independent	Kerryn Phelps (Note: Malcolm Turnbull (Liberal) had won Wentworth at the 2016 election, however he resigned in 2018 and Kerryn Phelps (Independent) won the seat at the resulting by-election.)	1.22		2.53	1.31	Dave Sharma	Liberal

== Aftermath and reactions ==
=== Domestic reactions ===
Morrison stated that "the quiet Australians ... have won a great victory tonight". Although he described the outcome as a miracle, colleagues said that Morrison had been certain that he would win the election, unlike many other politicians.

Following the results Shorten announced his resignation as leader of the Labor Party, triggering the 2019 Australian Labor Party leadership election. Former deputy prime minister Anthony Albanese, who ran in the October 2013 leadership election, announced his candidacy, and was elected unopposed to the role later that month. Albanese's path to the leadership was cleared after Chris Bowen, Shadow Treasurer in the Shorten Ministry and a member of the more fiscally-conservative Labor Right, withdrew his candidacy shortly after nominating.

During the election the Labor Party lodged a complaint over Liberal Party Chinese-language signs that they say 'deceived voters' in the seats of treasurer Josh Frydenberg in Kooyong and Chisholm. After the election the independent candidate for Kooyong, Oliver Yates, took the case to court and petitioned for the results to be declared void. During court a Liberal Party figure admitted that the Chinese-language signs were designed to look like the AEC.

=== International reactions ===
Avatar of Jair Bolsonaro

Jair Bolsonaro
(@jairbolsonaro)
tweeted:

Portuguese:

Vitória conservadora na Austrália! Parabenizo o primeiro-ministro @ScottMorrisonMP por sua reeleição, refutando as pesquisas que davam vantagem à esquerda com o Partido Trabalhista. Grande vitória! 👍

Translation:

Conservative victory in Australia! I congratulate the Prime Minister @ScottMorrisonMP on his re-election, refuting the left-leaning polls from the Labor Party. Great victory! 👍

20 May 2019

Avatar of Donald Trump

Donald Trump
(@realDonaldTrump)
tweeted:

Congratulations to Scott on a GREAT WIN!

19 May 2019

- Brazil: President of Brazil Jair Bolsonaro using his official Twitter account expressed: "I congratulate Prime Minister Scott Morrison on his re-election, refuting the left-leaning polls with the Labor Party. Great victory!".
- Fiji: Prime Minister of Fiji Frank Bainimarama congratulated Morrison.
- France: Emmanuel Macron congratulated Morrison.
- India: Prime Minister of India Narendra Modi congratulated Australian prime minister Scott Morrison on his victory in the elections. In a tweet, Modi wished the people of Australia all success under Mr Morrison's dynamic leadership. He said, as strategic partners, he is looking forward to continue working together closely to further strengthen the relationship between India and Australia.
- Israel: Prime Minister of Israel Benjamin Netanyahu, who visited Australia in 2017, congratulated Morrison's win.
- New Zealand: Prime Minister of New Zealand Jacinda Ardern phoned Australian prime minister Scott Morrison to congratulate him, stating that she looked forward to strong relations between the two countries. She added that Morrison understood New Zealand, "having lived and worked here." Ardern also thanked Opposition leader Bill Shorten for unifying the Australian Labor Party and fighting a strong campaign. Former prime ministers Bill English and John Key (both from the National Party) also congratulated Morrison.
- Papua New Guinea: Prime Minister of Papua New Guinea Peter O'Neill congratulated Morrison's win.
- Singapore: Prime Minister of Singapore Lee Hsien Loong congratulated Australian prime minister Scott Morrison over his victory and invited him to visit Singapore in conjunction with the annual Singapore–Australia Leader's summit to discuss strengthening the Comprehensive Strategic Partnership.
- United Kingdom: Prime Minister of the United Kingdom Theresa May spoke to Australian prime minister Scott Morrison over the phone to congratulate him on his election victory. They also discussed the opportunities for engagement in the months ahead, including upcoming talks between Foreign and Defence Ministers.
- United States: United States President Donald Trump tweeted his congratulations to Prime Minister Scott Morrison on his 'miracle election win', "Congratulations to Scott on a Great Win!". Vice President Mike Pence phoned Morrison, offering his congratulations.

== See also ==
- Members of the Australian House of Representatives, 2019–2022
- Members of the Australian Senate, 2019–2022
- Pre-election pendulum for the 2019 Australian federal election
- List of political parties in Australia
