= Fraser Anning =

Australian politician (born 1949)

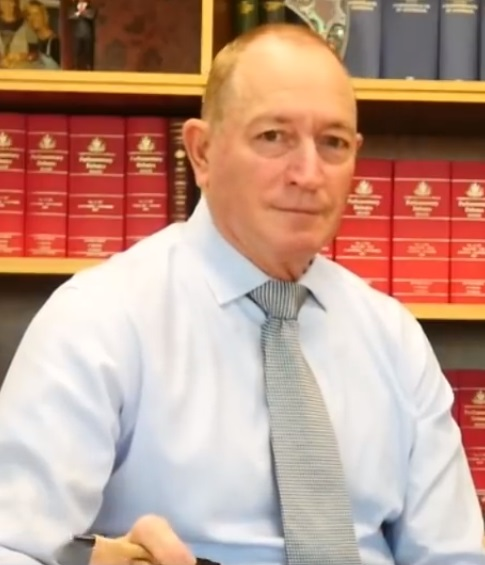
- Anning in 2018

Leader of the Conservative National Party
- In office 2 April 2019 – 23 September 2020
- Preceded by: Position established
- Succeeded by: Position abolished

Senator for Queensland
- In office 10 November 2017 – 30 June 2019
- Preceded by: Malcolm Roberts
- Succeeded by: Malcolm Roberts

Personal details
- Born: William Fraser Anning; 14 October 1949 (age 77) Brisbane, Queensland, Australia
- Party: Conservative National (2019–2020) (Note: The party was commonly called the "Conservative National Party". The official name recognised by the Australian Electoral Commission (AEC) was titled: "Fraser Anning's Conservative National Party". However, both the name and the abbreviated name ("Conservative National Party") proposed were objected to by the National Party and its New South Wales branch, as well as the Australian Conservatives party.)
- Other political affiliations: One Nation (1997–2003; 2014–2018); Katter's Australian (2018); Independent (until 1997; 2018–2019)
- Occupation: Grazier; Hotel owner; Politician

Military service
- Allegiance: Australia
- Branch/service: Australian Army Reserve
- Years of service: 1969–1973
- Unit: 49th Battalion, Royal Queensland Regiment

William Fraser Anning (born 14 October 1949) is an Australian former politician who was a senator for Queensland from November 2017 to June 2019. Anning is known for holding far-right, nativist, and anti-Muslim views, and has been criticised for his use of the Nazi euphemism for the Holocaust, when he proposed a plebiscite to be the "Final Solution" to "the immigration problem" in his maiden speech. Anning also generated controversy for his statements shortly after the Christchurch mosque shootings in New Zealand, in which he blamed the attacks on "the immigration program which allowed Muslim fanatics to migrate".

Anning was elected to the Senate after a special recount was triggered by the removal of One Nation senator Malcolm Roberts. Anning chose not to join One Nation in the Senate, sitting instead as an independent until June 2018, when he joined Katter's Australian Party (KAP) as its first senator. Anning was expelled by KAP in October 2018 for his views on race and immigration. Anning sat again as an independent, until registration of Fraser Anning's Conservative National Party was granted in April 2019. He failed to get re-elected to the Senate in the 2019 federal election, when standing under his own party's banner.

White Rose Society and ABC News have detailed the white supremacist links of some of Anning's closest advisers. His companions have included convicted criminals such as Neil Erikson and members of the militant white supremacist group True Blue Crew, whose members and supporters have been linked to right-wing terrorism.

Anning was sought by creditors over unpaid debts in late 2019, and declared bankrupt on 16 March 2020.

== Early life and family history ==
Anning grew up in north-west Queensland on Wetherby Station, one of the Anning family's pastoral properties near the town of Richmond. He is a direct descendant of Charles Cumming Stone Anning, a pastoral squatter who immigrated to the Australian colonies in the mid-19th century to acquire landholdings. Charles and several of his sons established the Reedy Springs property north of Hughenden in 1862, and soon expanded their claims by forming the nearby properties of Chudleigh Park, Mount Sturgeon, Charlotte Plains and Cargoon. In response to the spearing of their cattle by Aboriginal Australians, the Annings would ride out with firearms, attack Aboriginal campsites and capture young boys for the purpose of forced labour on their cattle and sheep stations. The Annings at times also requested the services of the local Native Police paramilitary unit to assist in clearing "blacks" off their runs. Frank Hann, another pastoralist in the region who regularly participated in extrajudicial punitive raids on Aboriginals, described in his diary in 1874 that he saw "Anning [coming] back from hunting blacks".

Fraser Anning's grandfather Francis "Frank" Albert Anning spent much of his time at Reedy Springs but also bought into further properties such as Wollogorang, Savannah Station and Compton Downs. One of Frank's sons was W. H. (Harry) Anning who took up the Wetherby property and whose wife gave birth to Fraser Anning in October 1949.

== Political career ==
Anning holds strong anti-abortion views. He opposed same-sex marriage and was one of twelve senators who voted against the Marriage Amendment (Definition and Religious Freedoms) Act 2017, which made same-sex marriage legal in Australia. In 2017, when Cory Bernardi moved a motion opposing Medicare funding of gender-selective abortion, Anning was one of ten senators who voted for the motion, which was defeated with 36 votes against.

On 22 March 2018, Anning announced that he would support the Turnbull Government's proposed company tax cuts.

Anning introduced a private members' bill calling for less stringent import laws for mace, pepper spray and tasers, to "allow women to defend themselves". It was supported by David Leyonhjelm, Peter Georgiou, Cory Bernardi and Brian Burston, but rejected by both major parties and the Greens.

In 2018, Anning described the perpetrators of attacks on South African farms as "subhuman", also claiming that a state-orchestrated "genocide" was underway in South Africa.

Anning stated in a Senate speech that he believed Safe Schools was "sexually deviant propaganda" and undermined "the white family". He criticised the curriculum as "gender fluidity garbage".

On 5 January 2019, Anning attended a far-right rally in Melbourne led by far-right extremist Blair Cottrell, founder of the United Patriots Front.

In January 2019, he began the process with the Australian Electoral Commission (AEC) to register a new political party, called "Fraser Anning's Conservative National Party" with a registered abbreviation of "The Conservative Nationals". After the proposal to register that abbreviation was withdrawn, the AEC granted formal registration on 2 April 2019.

In May 2019, Anning was criticised for a series of anti-Muslim Facebook posts, one of which included an image of a Muslim family taken in 2005 after their 19-month-old daughter Rahma went missing from their Sydney home, along with the words "If you want a Muslim for a neighbour, just vote Labor". Rahma has never been found.

Zack Newton, an electoral officer on Senator Anning's staff, was reported by the ABC as saying in early April 2019 that it was "amusing to think I went from shitposting at home and now I'm shitposting in parliament, but here I am lmao".

=== One Nation ===
In 1998, Anning stood as a One Nation candidate for the lower house division of Fairfax at that year's federal election.

Anning was third on the One Nation senate ticket in Queensland at the 2016 federal election. He gained just 19 below-the-line first-preference votes under the optional preferential voting system. Due to its high statewide count, One Nation elected two senators in Queensland at the 2016 election – party leader Pauline Hanson and Malcolm Roberts. In October 2017, during the parliamentary eligibility crisis, the Court of Disputed Returns ruled Roberts was ineligible to be elected to the Senate due to his failure to renounce his British citizenship. The following month, on 10 November, Anning was declared elected in place of Roberts following a special recount. Prior to his elevation to the Senate, he was facing bankruptcy legal action due to money owed to the Bendigo and Adelaide Bank. That could have made him ineligible to sit in parliament, but the case was withdrawn.

Upon his swearing in to the Senate on 13 November 2017, Anning was vouched for (a parliamentary custom indicating that the new member is who he claims to be) by two crossbenchers from other parties: Cory Bernardi (Australian Conservatives) and David Leyonhjelm (Liberal Democrats). Later on the same day, One Nation leader Pauline Hanson issued a media release saying that Anning had "abandoned" the party to sit as an independent "until something else comes along". Anning responded that "she [Hanson] made my position pretty much untenable with her conditions." On 16 November, it was reported that neither Anning nor Hanson had formally made their intentions clear to the Senate chamber regarding his party status, and he therefore remained a One Nation senator in the eyes of the Senate. It was also unclear whether Hanson intended to expel Anning solely from the parliamentary group or the wider organisational party as well. On 15 January 2018, Anning advised the Senate President that he would henceforth sit as an independent, and a month later he formed a voting bloc with Bernardi and Leyonhjelm. On 4 June 2018, Anning joined Katter's Australian Party, becoming the party's first senator.

=== 2018 maiden speech ===
On 14 August 2018, Anning delivered his maiden speech to the Senate. In it, he called for a plebiscite to reintroduce the White Australia Policy, especially with regard to excluding Muslims. Anning went on to criticise the Safe Schools Coalition of Australia, as "gender fluidity garbage" and "cultural Marxism". He also condemned what he described as the abuse of the external affairs power of the Australian constitution, and spoke in support of a fundamental right of civilians to own firearms, and the Bradfield Scheme irrigation proposal.

His speech included a reference to a "final solution"—the phrase used by the German Nazi Party to refer to the preparation and execution of the Holocaust, when he said "The final solution to the immigration problem is, of course, a popular vote." Anning claimed that his comments were taken out of context and that he had used the phrase to introduce the last of six policies he proposed about immigration. His comments were condemned across the Parliament, including by the Labor Party, the Liberals, the Nationals, the Greens, Pauline Hanson's One Nation and the Centre Alliance, among other crossbenchers in both the House of Representatives and the Senate. He refused to apologise for his comments. Pauline Hanson said she was appalled by Anning's comments and described them as "straight from Goebbels' handbook". However, Anning's party leader Bob Katter described it as "a magnificent speech, solid gold" and said he "1000 percent supports" Anning.

However, Anning was expelled from Katter's Australia Party two months later for distinguishing between "European" and "Non-European" migration in legislation, as it was viewed by the party as bigotry against Sikhs and Pacific Islanders.

Anning's party expulsion came after Queensland Labor premier, Annastacia Palaszczuk cut the party's parliamentary staff numbers.

=== Christchurch mosque shootings and egg incident ===
Anning was sharply criticised for his comments following the Christchurch mosque shootings, which occurred in New Zealand on 15 March 2019, during which 51 Muslim worshippers were killed. He claimed that immigration of "Muslim fanatics" led to the attacks, and that "while Muslims may have been victims today, usually they are the perpetrators". Anning also stated that the massacre "highlights ... the growing fear within our community ... of the increasing Muslim presence." The comments received international attention and were overwhelmingly criticised as being insensitive and racist, and sympathetic to the views of the perpetrator. As of 18 March 2019, a petition calling for his expulsion from the Australian parliament had amassed 1.2 million signatures, although the ability for the Senate to expel a senator had been removed under the Parliamentary Privileges Act 1987.

On 16 March 2019, Anning was struck by an egg on the back of his head by 17-year-old William Connolly (dubbed "Egg Boy" by the media) while speaking to the media and his supporters in an industrial warehouse/event space in the Melbourne suburb of Moorabbin. Anning subsequently slapped Connolly twice in the face. Connolly was then tackled by several of Anning's supporters, including United Patriots Front leader Neil Erikson, one of whom held Connolly in a choke hold until police arrived and took the teenager away. Connolly was taken into custody by police, but was released without charge, while they launched an investigation into the violence.

On the day following the incident, Prime Minister of Australia Scott Morrison criticised Anning, arguing that "the full force of the law" should be applied to the senator. A fundraiser was started to support Connolly's legal fees and "to buy more eggs", claiming to have raised over $10,000 in under 24 hours. Connolly said he would give the money raised to the victims' families. The money was held by a law firm acting without fee and on 27 May, Connolly announced that a total of $99,922 had been donated to two funds providing for the victims of the Christchurch shooting.

The police announced the completion of their investigation three weeks after the incident, saying that Anning would not be charged as his actions had been in self-defence, and that Connolly had received an official caution. However, a man who allegedly kicked Connolly several times while he was held down was charged with assault.

=== Fraser Anning's Conservative National Party ===
On 11 January 2019, it was announced that Anning would form a party named Fraser Anning's Conservative National Party. On 2 April 2019, the party was registered by the Australian Electoral Commission. Anning said he would "be announcing candidates across most lower house seats" and "running a Senate team in every state" for the 2019 election. Two parties, the Australian Conservatives and The Nationals objected to the name, arguing it was too similar to theirs and would cause confusion for voters. However, the AEC said the use of "Fraser" and "Anning" in the party's name was "sufficient to aurally and visually distinguish the party's name and abbreviation from other names and abbreviations on the ballot paper". There were similar objections to the request to adopt the abbreviation "The Conservative Nationals". Registration was only granted following the withdrawal of that proposal.

On 26 April 2019, during the 2019 federal election campaign, Anning used the site of the 2005 Cronulla race riots in Sydney to announce his party's candidates for New South Wales. A 19-year-old supporter of Anning was arrested and charged with assault and intimidation after being involved in an altercation with members of the media immediately after the announcement, allegedly punching a photographer and abusing a journalist. Video footage shows the young man repeatedly punching the photographer, who sustained injury. The assailant was a member of the militant white supremacist group True Blue Crew, which has been linked to terrorism.

Adrian David Cheok was a candidate for the Fraser Anning's Conservative National Party, receiving 0.79% of the vote in the Adelaide division of Boothby. Anning lost his Senate seat in the 2019 election.

The party was deregistered by the AEC on 23 September 2020.

== Bankruptcy and further developments ==
In Anning's absence, the Federal Court of Australia handed down an order winding up his estate on 16 March 2020, as part of an ongoing dispute with Adelaide and Bendigo Bank, which was chasing a debt of $185,000 related to Mr Anning's investment in a failed agribusiness scheme. The date of his bankruptcy was set to 15 July 2019. As of 2019, sources close to Anning said he was visiting family in the United States and had not said when he will return to Australia. He was continuing to post on a Facebook page named Fraser Anning-Former Senator.

In September 2020, Anning was announced as a founding member of the Institute for Populism and Economic Nationalism, alongside Steve Bannon.

In November 2020, the Australian Electoral Commission (AEC) brought legal action against Anning, seeking a penalty of up to $26,640 for allegedly failing to lodge required financial returns for the 2018–19 financial year. On 16 February 2021, the AEC dropped the case because they were unable to locate Anning in Australia despite several attempts to contact him, with the AEC believing him to be in the United States.

In 2021, Adrian David Cheok published a biography of Fraser Anning.

In August 2021 Queensland Civil and Administrative Tribunal ordered Anning remove offensive posts against Muslims on Facebook and Twitter, most of which were from his time as Senator from 2017-2019.

== Personal life ==
Anning and his wife, Fiona, have two daughters. He is a Catholic, but not a regular churchgoer.
