= Fraser Anning's Conservative National Party =

Australian political party

Conservative National Party Fraser Anning's Conservative National Party
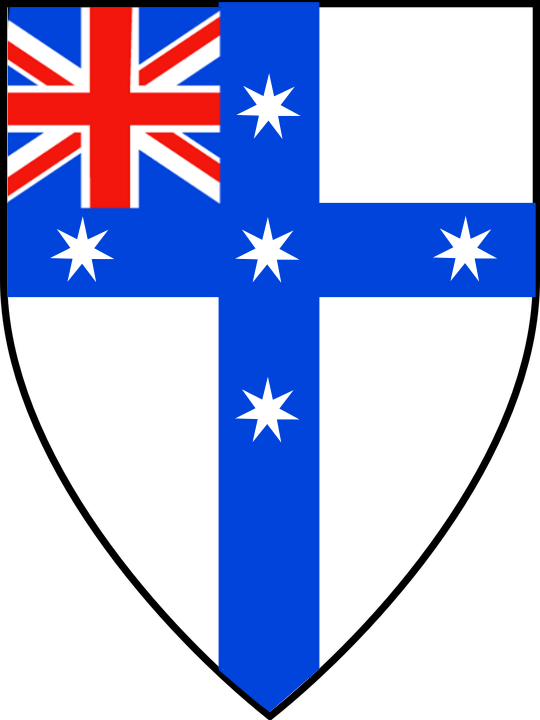
- Abbreviation: FACNP; CNP
- Leader: Fraser Anning
- Founder: Fraser Anning
- Founded: 2 April 2019; 7 years ago (Note: Also date of registration to the Australian Electoral Commission (AEC).)
- Dissolved: 23 September 2020; 6 years ago
- Split from: Katter's Australian; One Nation
- Headquarters: Brisbane, Queensland, Australia
- Youth wing: Young Conservative Nationalists
- Ideology: Australian nativism; Australian nationalism; Economic nationalism; Anti-immigration; Anti-Islam; National conservatism; Right-wing populism
- Political position: Right-wing to far-right
- Religion: Christianity
- Colours: Blue
- Slogan: "One nation under God, united by the crimson threads of kinship."
- Senate: 1 / 76 (2016–2019)
- Ku-ring-gai Council: 1 / 10 (2019–2020)

Federation Flag

Website
- conservativenationalparty.org

Fraser Anning's Conservative National Party, also known as the Conservative National Party or simply the Conservative Nationals, was a national-conservative political party in Australia, founded by Fraser Anning in April 2019 when he was a senator for Queensland. Anning had previously been a member of One Nation and Katter's Australian Party, and sat as an independent before founding the new party. The party contested the 2019 federal election, but failed to win a seat.

The party was deregistered by the Australian Electoral Commission on 23 September 2020.

== History ==
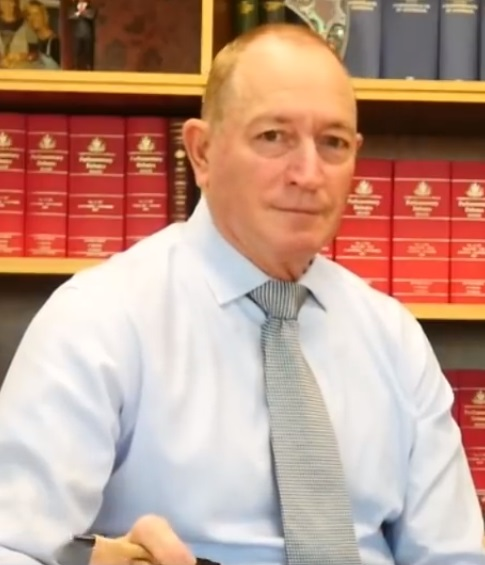
Fraser Anning, the party's leader, c. 2018.

=== Defection from One Nation and Katter's Australian Party ===
Fraser Anning stood as the third candidate on the One Nation list for Queensland at the 2016 federal election, with Pauline Hanson and Malcolm Roberts standing as the first and second candidates respectively. After Malcolm Roberts was found ineligible during the 2017–2018 eligibility crisis due to his dual citizenship, Anning was declared by the Court of Disputed Returns elected, replacing Roberts. After a conflict with the party's chief of staff James Ashby over his choice of staff, Anning resigned from the party and was sworn in to the senate as an independent.

Anning joined Katter's Australian Party in June 2018. During his maiden speech, in August 2018, Anning proposed a "final solution to the immigration problem" with a referendum and a "European Christian" immigration system. Despite initially supporting Anning's speech, the party expelled him two months later with Bob Katter labelling Anning's views as racist.

=== Party foundation ===
In January 2019, Anning applied to register Fraser Anning's Conservative National Party. The National Party and the Australian Conservatives objected to the name, arguing it was too similar to theirs and would cause confusion for voters. The Australian Electoral Commission responded that there was no real chance that electors would be left uncertain about which name attaches to which organisation due to inclusion of "Fraser Anning" in the name, which would additionally also result in distinct party abbreviations.

The AEC approved the party's registration on 2 April 2019, after the application for the formal abbreviation "Conservative Nationals" was withdrawn, in time for the party to contest the 2019 federal election. Anning said he would be "announcing candidates across most lower house seats" and "running a Senate team in every state" for the election.

=== May 2019 federal election ===
The party put up 70 candidates across both houses. These included several who have likened LGBTQI people to paedophiles, those who have been accused of animal cruelty, who have criticised single mothers and disability pensioners, and at least two who have criminal histories. One candidate, Scott Moerland, was a senior figure in the United Patriots Front and has links with Blair Cottrell and Neil Erikson, despite Anning's earlier claim that he would not endorse anyone associated with them. Their social media posts target immigrants from certain countries, Muslims, political correctness, LGBTQI people and ideas, and people and policies tackling climate change. The party failed to win a seat; Anning himself did not get re-elected to the Senate.

=== Deregistration ===
The party was deregistered on 23 September 2020, under Section 137(4) of the Commonwealth Electoral Act 1918.

== Ideology and policies ==
Anning himself has been described as far-right, a nationalist and a right-wing populist. He attended a far-right rally in Melbourne for which he claimed almost $3000 in expenses from the government. At the rally he made claims about an "African gang problem" in Queensland, claims that were rejected by Queensland's police commissioner. He also blamed Muslim immigration for terrorism, calling for an "end [to] all immigration from Muslim and black African nations". Its stated policies include:

- Australia to be an English-speaking predominantly European Christian society; immigration to reflect this
- Traditional family values (opposition to same-sex marriage, assisted suicide or abortion)
- The right to own firearms and use them in self-defence
- Australia-first foreign policy and repudiation of coercive international treaties
- Creation of a not-for-profit government bank
- Unrestricted freedom of speech
- Welfare restricted to Australian citizens

== Federal parliament ==
House of Representatives
Election year	# of overall votes	% of overall vote	# of overall seats won	+/–	Government
2019	77,203	0.54 (#8)	0 / 150	Steady	

Senate
Election year	# of overall votes	% of overall vote	# of overall seats won	# of overall seats	+/–	Notes
2019	94,130	0.64 (#14)	0 / 40	0 / 76	Steady	

== Controversies ==
=== Cronulla assault ===
On 26 April 2019, during the 2019 Federal Election campaign, Anning used the site of the 2005 Cronulla race riots in Sydney to announce his party's candidates for New South Wales. A 19-year-old supporter of Anning was arrested and charged with assault and intimidation after being involved in an altercation with members of the media immediately after the announcement, allegedly punching a photographer and abusing a journalist. Video footage shows the young man repeatedly punching the photographer, who sustained injury. The assailant was a member of the militant white supremacist group True Blue Crew, which has been linked to terrorism.

=== Rahma el-Dennaoui ===
On 12 May 2019, an official post on Anning's Facebook page included a picture of the family of Rahma el-Dennaoui, a toddler who disappeared in 2005, accompanied with the phrase "if you want a Muslim for a neighbour, just vote Labor" and the party's logo. The photo appeared to be from a 2010 Daily Telegraph article published shortly after the girl's disappearance. The post was deleted the following day, but not before it had attracted a number of negative comments after Mariam Veiszadeh and others had commented about it on social media.

== See also ==
- Fraser Anning
- One Nation
- Katter's Australian Party
- Australian nationalism
- List of political parties in Australia
