= Malcolm Roberts (politician) =

Australian politician (born 1955)

Senator Malcolm Roberts
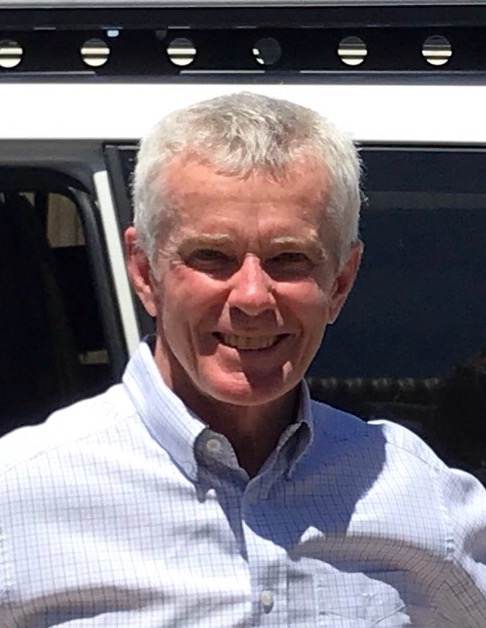
- Roberts in 2020

Senator for Queensland
- Incumbent
- Assumed office 1 July 2019
- Preceded by: Fraser Anning
- In office 2 July 2016 – 27 October 2017
- Preceded by: Joanna Lindgren
- Succeeded by: Fraser Anning

Personal details
- Born: Malcolm Ieuan Roberts; 3 May 1955 (age 71) Disergarh, West Bengal, India
- Citizenship: Australian (1974–present); British (until 2016); Indian (until 1974)
- Party: One Nation
- Height: 165 cm (5 ft 5 in)
- Education: University of Queensland (BEng); University of Chicago (MBA)
- Profession: Engineer businessman politician

Malcolm Ieuan Roberts (born 3 May 1955) is an Indian-born Australian far-right politician who has been a senator for Queensland since 2019 as a member of One Nation. He was previously a senator from 2016 to 2017.

Roberts studied engineering at the University of Queensland. He was a mining engineer before entering politics, working in the coal industry including as general manager of the Gordonstone coal mine in central Queensland. Roberts was elected to the Senate at the 2016 federal election, running second in One Nation's ticket in Queensland behind party leader Pauline Hanson. In 2017, during the Australian parliamentary eligibility crisis, he was disqualified from parliament for holding British citizenship by descent in breach of section 44 of the constitution. He was re-elected to the Senate at the 2019 election as One Nation's lead candidate in Queensland.

Roberts is known for his climate change denial, and has been a proponent of various far-right fringe conspiracy theories. Prior to his election to the Senate he founded the Galileo Movement to lobby against the Gillard government's carbon pricing legislation. He has also been associated with anti-globalism and opposition to the United Nations.

== Early life and education ==
Roberts was born on 3 May 1955 in Disergarh, West Bengal, India. He is the son of Ieuan Roberts, a Welsh coal miner, later a coal mine manager and then Queensland's chief inspector of mines, and Ethel Jago, from rural Queensland. His childhood home in India employed Muslim, Buddhist, and Hindu servants. As a child, Roberts built a miniature coal mine in the yard of his home. Roberts and his family moved to Australia in 1962, as his father was recruited to manage a mine in Hunter Valley, New South Wales. Roberts stated he does not remember his childhood in India.

Roberts graduated from the University of Queensland with Bachelor of Engineering (Honours). He also has an MBA from the University of Chicago Graduate School of Business. An Australian court found that Roberts had wrongly sought a $30,000 tax deduction for the costs of the MBA spent between 1988 and 1990.

== Career ==
In 1977, Roberts began work as a coal miner. During this time, until 1979, he worked in this role at five different mines across Australia before becoming a mining engineer. Thereafter, he worked as an engineer and general manager for companies such as Peabody Coal Company, Consolidation Coal Company and Atlantic Richfield, though he had not held paid employment for eight years prior to his election in 2016.

=== Coal mining ===
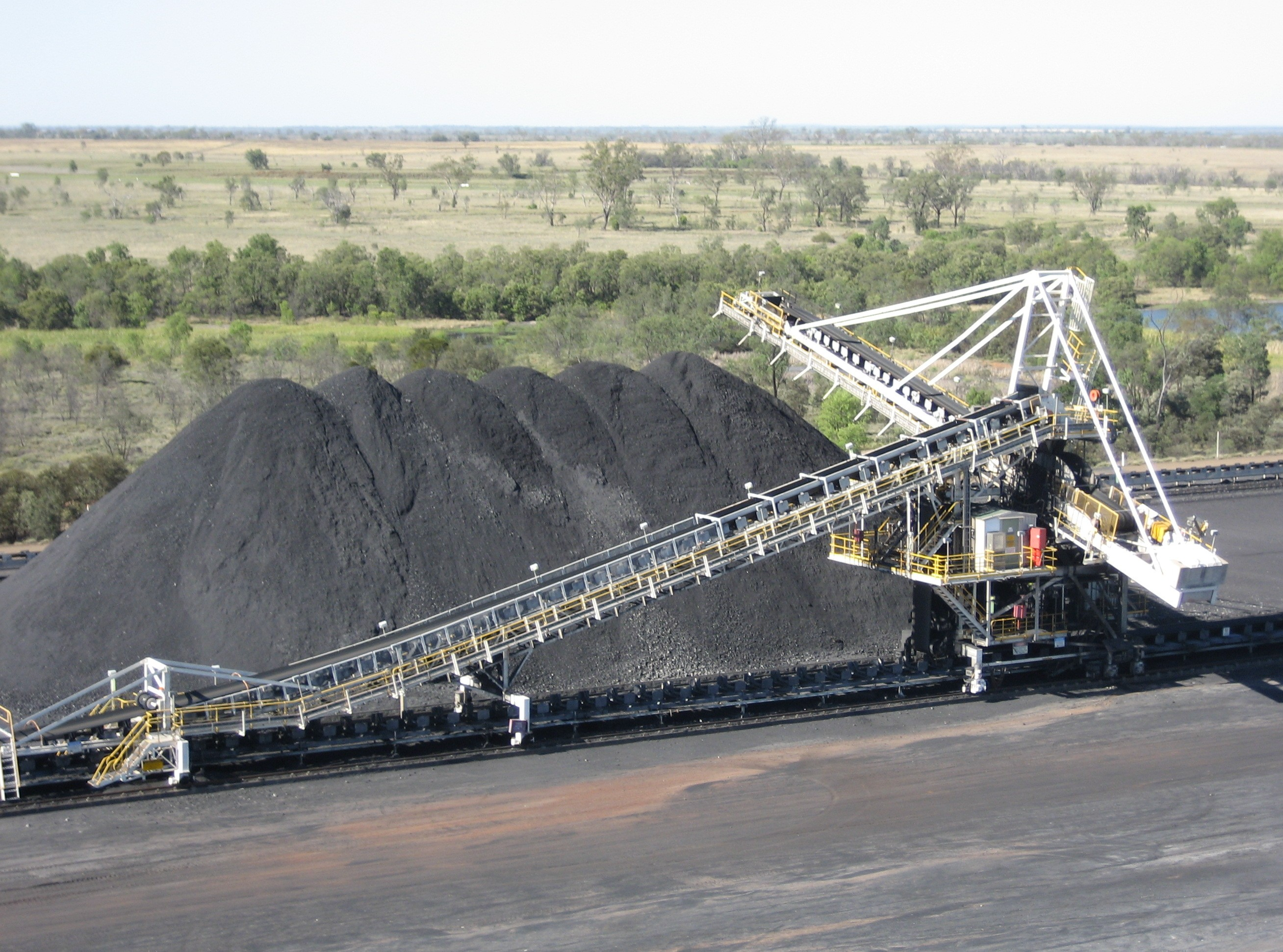
Gordonstone coal mine (now Kestrel coal mine) in 2007

From 1982 to 1988, Roberts worked as a manager for Coal & Allied at West Wallsend. The mine proved to be unprofitable due to its location, leading to its sale in 1988, at which time Roberts took a redundancy package. After completing an MBA, Roberts was appointed general manager at the Gordonstone coal mine in Queensland, the largest underground mine in Australia. Roberts left the role three years later. According to Roberts, he resigned due to a lack of support during an industrial dispute, but others have suggested that he was let go after cost overruns at the mine.

With his wife, in 1994 he established a management consultancy, Catalyst For Corporate Performance, and became involved in Eastern and alternative self-help techniques including meditation.

=== Volunteer work ===
Roberts served as chairman of the board of the Brisbane Montessori School from 1999 until 2003 and served voluntarily on the advisory board (as a parent representative member) of the International Montessori Council from 2000 until 2008. Timothy Seldin, chairman of the Montessori Foundation, stated that Roberts' views "are not representative of Dr Montessori's global vision, and do not reflect the views of the Montessori Foundation or the International Montessori Council".

=== Earlier climate-change denial activities ===
From 2006 until his election to the Senate, Roberts was a full-time political activist, speaking at rallies against the Labor Government's carbon tax. He sent hundreds of emails to political, scientific and media figures on the topic. He met politicians, had universities launch academic inquiries into climate scientists and sent legal letters demanding the resignation of government ministers.

He is the leader of the Galileo Movement, established in 2011. A 2011 Scientific American article on the group stated that it "recycles many of the same straw man arguments and distortions about the science that other groups have previously employed".

== Senate ==
Roberts was elected to the Senate at the 2016 Australian federal election, running in second place on One Nation's ticket in Queensland, behind party leader Pauline Hanson. However, he was subsequently found to be ineligible for election. He received 77 first-preference votes in that election, the lowest number ever for a member of the federal parliament.

=== Senate eligibility and disqualification ===
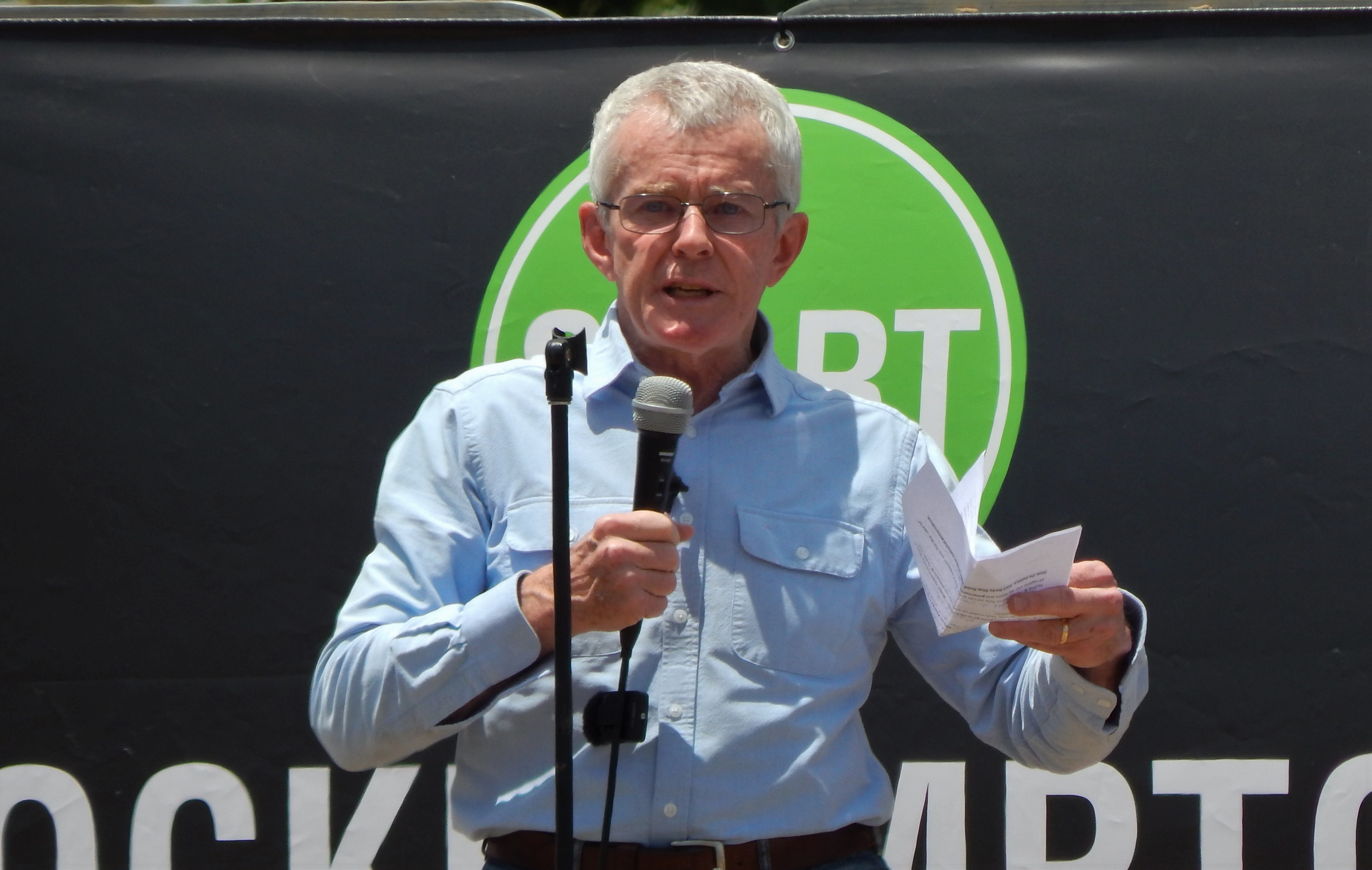
Malcolm Roberts at a Start Rockhampton Ring Road rally, 2022

Following the 2017 resignations of Scott Ludlam and Larissa Waters due to dual citizenship and Matt Canavan's resignation from the Cabinet for similar reasons, Roberts' place of birth and citizenship was scrutinised by the media. Roberts released a statutory declaration to the effect that he is only an Australian citizen, despite birth records showing that he had previously been identified as a British national. A spokesperson for Roberts stated that Roberts was "choosing to believe that he was never British". Doubts persisted about the status of Roberts' Indian citizenship after it was argued in the media that under a precedent set by the Supreme Court of India, he continued to be a 'presumed citizen' of the country.

On 9 August 2017, the Senate referred his position to the High Court as Court of Disputed Returns. The reference was moved by his party leader Pauline Hanson, with his support. On 22 September 2017, the High Court of Australia found that Roberts was a citizen of the United Kingdom, through descent from his Welsh father, when he was elected at the 2016 federal election. His suitability for retaining his Senate seat depended on whether he had taken appropriate steps to renounce his British citizenship prior to his nomination. Between August and October 2017, Roberts stated several contradictory positions regarding his citizenship, including that he had "absolute conviction" of being an Australian upon nomination, that he had emailed British authorities on 1 May 2016, first requesting to renounce his citizenship, and upon receiving no reply for a month, sent a subsequent email on 6 June (three days after his nomination) stating, "As there was no reply to my email last month (see below) and although I am confident I am not a British citizen, with this email I renounce any British citizenship should it exist." It was subsequently revealed that the email domains that Roberts had contacted were defunct and no longer in use. Roberts sent a formal application to renounce his United Kingdom citizenship on 2 November 2016, and his renouncement became official on 5 December 2016.

A final decision regarding Roberts's senatorial eligibility was scheduled to be heard by the High Court, as the Court of Disputed Returns, between 10 and 12 October 2017. However, the Court delegated the fact-finding task to a single judge, Justice Keane, before whom Roberts appeared on 21 September and who reported his findings on the following day.

Following Roberts's birth in India, the UK High Commission registered his birth as a Citizen of the United Kingdom and Colonies, and the Australian Trade Commissioner made an entry in his mother's passport that he "is the child of an Australian citizen but has not acquired Australian citizenship". The British nationality experts' opinion was that Roberts became a British citizen at birth (whether registered or not), and ceased to be a British citizen on 5 December 2016 when his renunciation was registered. Keane J found that Roberts knew he did not become an Australian citizen until May 1974 and that, when he nominated for the Senate, he knew there was a possibility that he might have been, and remained, a citizen of the United Kingdom. Keane J found that his actions before nomination had been ineffectual to renounce his UK citizenship, which had been belatedly renounced on 5 December 2016.

On 27 October 2017, the full High Court, as the Court of Disputed Returns, ruled that Roberts had been ineligible to be elected to the Parliament. Roberts and One Nation leader Pauline Hanson subsequently announced that Roberts would nominate as a candidate for the electoral district of Ipswich at the 2017 Queensland state election. He was not elected. In February 2018, it was announced that Roberts would lead the One Nation Senate ticket in Queensland at the 2019 Australian federal election. Pauline Hanson said: "Malcolm Roberts has got the reputation as a powerhouse, the empirical science man, and he's really taken it up to members of parliament".

In September 2017, before the High Court ruling on Roberts's eligibility, blogger Tony Magrathea initiated a High Court action alleging that Roberts had sat in the Senate while disqualified, contrary to the Common Informers (Parliamentary Disqualifications) Act 1975. On 24 June 2019, the High Court found the allegation proved and ordered Roberts to pay a penalty of $6,000 to Magrathea.

=== Re-election ===
With his citizenship clear, Roberts was elected to the Senate again in 2019.

Roberts was re-elected to the Senate in 2025.

== Political positions and controversies ==
Roberts has "long espoused various conspiracy theories" and his statements and attendance at fringe events have come under public scrutiny.

=== COVID vaccines ===
Roberts has been accused of spreading misinformation about Covid and vaccines against the virus. Before the 2022 federal election he falsely claimed that Covid vaccines greatly increased rates of miscarriages amongst pregnant women He has also falsely claimed that the COVID-19 vaccines were bioweapons to control the world and were developed by the US military. and that images of deaths from Covid in Italy and China were ‘staged.’

=== Sovereign citizen movement ===
Roberts has frequently used a style of writing and terminology linked to the sovereign citizen movement. This movement sees governments as illegitimate and attempts to assert the rights of individuals to ignore laws and taxes. Members of this movement aspire to exist outside both the social and legal bounds of society, and use colons and hyphens to evade what they claim is government enslavement via grammar.

In 2011, Roberts wrote an affidavit to then Prime Minister Julia Gillard – addressing her as "The Woman, Julia-Eileen: Gillard., acting as The Honourable JULIA EILEEN GILLARD" — demanding that she sign a contract exempting him from paying the carbon tax and compensation of up to $280,000 if she didn't provide him with disclosure on 28 points, including evidence that "the Commonwealth of Australia CIK# 000805157 is not a corporation registered on the United States of America securities exchange". Roberts signed himself as "Malcolm-Ieuan: Roberts., the living soul". He has used this form of sovereign citizen address since, in a list of acknowledgements he wrote in 2013. Roberts is a prolific letter writer. He writes to politicians, government agencies, universities and scientists. The topic of these letters is mostly formal complaints regarding allegations of corruption in climate science. He keeps an archive of his letters and replies at his website.

Roberts stated in 2016 that he did not identify as a "sovereign citizen".

=== Climate change ===
Roberts promotes climate conspiracy theories, and does not accept the scientific consensus on climate change.

His views were supported by Alan Jones, who is the patron of the Galileo Movement and interviewed Roberts on his breakfast program.

Roberts is a member of the Saltbush Club, a group that promotes climate change denial.

Roberts frequently states that NASA has falsified climate data to exaggerate warming in the Arctic. In November 2016, Gavin Schmidt, director of NASA's Goddard Institute for Space Studies, told Roberts he was "mistaken" to assert NASA had removed data to hide Arctic warming in the 1940s. Schmidt stated that the data was freely available online and that Roberts should check it himself, adding that he was surprised that Roberts was in fact a senator, and that his allegation of inappropriate temperature data adjustment is "the definition of denial".

Roberts' specific objection related to charts from Icelandic stations at Vestmannaeyjar and Teigarhorn, where temperatures from the 1930s and 1940s were adjusted down, removing the apparent warming recorded at that time. However a senior Icelandic meteorologist with a specialty in historical climatology emailed Roberts that the temperature adjustments, which were made because of a daytime bias and relocation of one of the stations, were "quite sound ... absolutely necessary and well founded".

In 2013, Roberts wrote a 300,000-word essay called CSIROh! (a play on the initialism CSIRO) that, according to a report in The Australian newspaper, claimed global warming is a UN-inspired hoax to introduce an "antihuman" socialist New World Order, aided by bankers and politicians. The essay was described as "conspiracist rubbish" by climate scientist David Karoly and "utterly stupid" by conservative commentator Andrew Bolt.

The CSIROh! document contained an attack on the environment editor of one of Australia's major newspapers, Ben Cubby of The Sydney Morning Herald. In it, Roberts charged that Cubby had failed to report on corruption of climate science, was ignorant of science, and that his articles were dishonest, inaccurate and spread corruption of climate science, inter alia. Roberts sent a copy of CSIROh! to Cubby and demanded a response. Cubby responded by commenting that the essay was "littered with errors of all kinds: a mish-mash of muddled conjecture, impossible leaps of logic, fundamental misunderstandings of the scientific method, misread and misquoted research that has been poorly cited, internal contradictions, confused dates, spelling mistakes, and strangled grammar. It is, in all respects, a dud."

In 2016, Roberts requested a briefing from the Commonwealth Scientific and Industrial Research Organisation (CSIRO) on scientific evidence of human-caused global warming. The briefing was delivered in September 2016, after which Roberts said he would consider the CSIRO's evidence, but also accused the CSIRO of pushing the "de-industrialisation" of Australia, and added that policies to mitigate climate change were "anti-human".

On 6 November 2016, Roberts delivered his response to the briefing, presenting a 42-page report titled "On Climate, CSIRO Lacks Empirical Proof", co-authored by Timothy Ball and Tony Heller. The report by Roberts and his co-authors included the spurious claim that sea level was not rising. They said that carbon dioxide in Earth's atmosphere "is not and cannot be affected by human production" and cannot affect atmospheric temperatures, denying the greenhouse effect. Their report misrepresented the work of the Intergovernmental Panel on Climate Change, alleged that international banks profit from climate change, and said that Under-Secretary-General of the United Nations Maurice Strong "was remarkably successful in gaining control of weather agencies". It said that "Misrepresentation of science and climate is a form of control over people's minds" and that "schools today subtly teach people what to think".

Roberts demanded that the Australian government set up an independent inquiry into the CSIRO and Bureau of Meteorology. He also demanded that Australia reject the Paris Agreement and leave the United Nations.

The CSIRO subsequently issued a statement that "CSIRO stands behind its peer-reviewed science on environment, climate and climate change".

In an exchange between Roberts and physicist Brian Cox on the live television talk show Q&A on ABC TV broadcast 15 August 2016, Roberts claimed that engineer and blogger Steven Goddard (a pseudonym of Tony Heller) had shown the NASA temperature data for the 1930s were "warmer than recent decades". In The Guardian's assessment, Roberts was referring to a debunked conspiracy theory that claimed 1934 was hotter than 1998. Cox then asked if NASA, the Australian Academy of Science, and the Met Office in the UK were all collaborating to manipulate global temperature data, to which Roberts asked if he was being accused of claiming they were all collaborating, to which Cox responded: "What, they've all manipulated it in the same way and accidentally got to the same answer? Is that what you're saying?"

=== Racial Discrimination Act ===
In 2016, Roberts called for the repeal of section 18C of the Racial Discrimination Act 1975, which makes it an offence to publicly "offend, insult, humiliate or intimidate" another person because of their race. He falsely attributed the passage of the section to Julia Gillard, despite the fact it was enacted in 1995 prior to her entry to parliament, and claimed that it had been passed to "nobble" conservative commentator Andrew Bolt, who had been successfully sued under the act in 2011. On ABC TV, Roberts said "You can call me short, you can call me fat... Whatever you want to call me, the only person who decides whether I'm upset is me". Roberts went on to claim without evidence that the Act prevented people from reporting crimes committed by Muslims.

=== Australian Building and Construction Commission ===
Roberts supports the reestablishment of the Office of the Australian Building and Construction Commissioner, which would have powers to fight union corruption in the construction industry, because he believes that its existence would promote freedom. He has stated that "we want to protect union members rather than the union bosses," and criticised the CFMEU for its impact upon small businesses.

=== Welfare ===
In his time in the senate, Roberts and One Nation voted with the Coalition government on a number of welfare cuts.

=== Antisemitism ===
Roberts has promoted "a string of conspiracy theories laced with antisemitic tropes, including the continued use of "globalist parasites" and claiming climate change was driven by policies "cabal" of "the major banking families in the world." He was condemned by Jewish leaders for sharing the antisemitic Freedom for Humanity mural on Twitter in 2024.

In a 135-page document titled Why? Motives Driving Climate Fraud, Roberts states that international bankers (the Rothschilds, Goldman Sachs, the Rockefellers and the Warburg family) are surreptitiously trying to gain global control through environmentalism. In the document, Roberts cites Eustace Mullins, the American anti-Semite and Holocaust denier who claimed that international banks and the US Federal Reserve were part of a Jewish conspiracy to introduce global socialism.

Roberts rejects the assertion that he is an anti-Semite, noting that two of the founders of the climate science denial Galileo Movement were Jewish, and stated that "I respect and admire the Jews".

==== Bondi Beach attack ====
In 2026, Roberts was widely condemned for refusing to rule out suggestions the 2025 Bondi Beach shooting was a "false flag" event and for using an antisemitic trope to claim "globalist parasites" had hijacked the United States government.

=== Islam ===
Roberts is a critic of Islam. In 2016, he said "Islam was a political ideology, a way of life, a legal system that was incompatible with Australia's secular system and was not a religion of peace."

During an interview on The Project in 2016, Roberts asserted that Australia is being "swamped by Muslims", and accused journalist Waleed Aly of condoning Islamic terrorism. In 2025, he argued that shari'a law was about to be imposed on Australia.

=== LGBTQ rights ===
Roberts has "consistently" voted against anti-discrimination measures for LGBTQ people, according to They Vote For You. At a Church and State conference in 2026, Roberts stated he is "in two minds" regarding whether gay people should have equal rights, and that society cannot afford to "ban" homosexuals.

=== Abortion ===
Roberts advocates for a total ban on abortion in Australia. His personal position on abortion law is much more restrictive than One Nation's official party policy position, as well as the views of his leader Pauline Hanson.

=== Foreign affairs ===
==== United Nations ====
Roberts believes that the United Nations is a threat to the Australian way of life: "Australian values and way of life are also at risk from insidious institutions such as the unelected swill that is the United Nations. Australia must leave the UN. We need an OzExit." He states that the UN is "destroying Australia’s sovereignty through deals such as Agenda 21". He has subscribed to the conspiracy theory that the United Nations is trying to run a ‘world government’ and dictates policy to the Australian Labor Party, a claim former Labor leader come One Nation MP Mark Latham told Robert’s was nonsense.

==== U.S. politics ====
Malcolm Roberts displayed a Gadsden flag at Parliament after Donald Trump's victory in the United States presidential election of 2016

Roberts commented on the 2016 United States presidential election by stating that "the only safe space for Hillary [Clinton] to occupy is a prison cell", and that he'd "settle for [her] going to Guantanamo, along with other terrorists". Roberts stated that his party, Pauline Hanson's One Nation, had hired former Trump economic adviser, Darren Brady Nelson.

Roberts celebrated the victory of President-elect Donald Trump by displaying a Gadsden flag at Parliament. He stated that the result supported his belief that people should not serve the government, but the government should serve the people.

==== Alex Jones scandal ====
In 2024, Roberts appeared on a podcast with American conspiracy theorist Alex Jones, praising Jones as "a beacon of hope around the world" after Jones spent years claiming the Sandy Hook school massacre was staged and promoting the conspiracy that the September 11 terrorist attacks were an inside job. In response Roberts said he was 'proud' to go on a podcast with Jones and that Jones had been vindicated "on many topics".

==== Russian invasion of Ukraine ====
Roberts said Russian president Vladimir Putin had "earned his respect" by invading Ukraine, describing Russia's war as a fight against "globalists" – a term commonly used as a pejorative in far-right politics and in various conspiracy theories, often with antisemitic tropes. He has also made other controversial statements about the conflict, including social media posts questioning whether Nazis were involved in Ukraine's defence and falsely claiming that Kyiv is under the sway of extremist nationalists and neo-Nazis.

== See also ==
- Climate change in Australia
