= Farrar, Northern Territory =

Farrar Darwin, Northern Territory
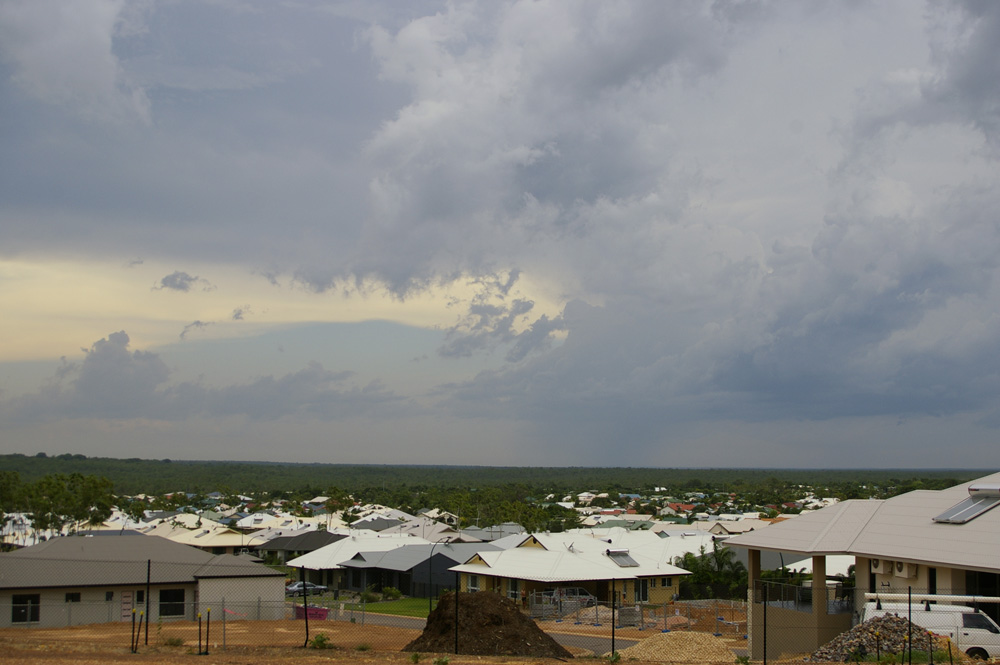
- Looking over the suburb of Farrar

- Coordinates: 12°28′41″S 130°59′28″E
- Population: 1,518 (2016 census)
- Established: 1990s
- Postcode(s): 0830
- Location: 21.7 km (13 mi) from Darwin; 1.1 km (1 mi) from Palmerston
- LGA(s): City of Palmerston
- Territory electorate(s): Johnston
- Federal division(s): Lingiari
Suburbs around Farrar:
Yarrawonga	Holtze	Holtze
Palmerston City	Farrar	Howard Springs
Bakewell	Gunn	Zuccoli

Farrar is an outer eastern suburb of Palmerston. It is 21 km SE of the Darwin CBD. Its Local Government Area is the City of Palmerston. Farrar is bounded to the north and east by the Stuart Highway, to the west Roystonea Avenue. Farrar was originally part of Gunn when Palmerston was divided into suburbs in 1984. It is on the traditional Country and waterways of the Larrakia people.

The development of Palmerston's eastern suburbs did not start in the 1990s as designed in 1984 and the suburb of Gunn of 1998 was larger. It was decided in 1999 to allocate a new name to the area of Gunn between the old and new Stuart Highway alignments.

The suburb is named after John Farrar, a pastoral pioneer of the Northern Territory.
