= Pre-election pendulum for the 2019 Australian federal election =

At the 2016 federal election of the 150 House of Representatives seats the Liberal/National Coalition won 76, a one-seat majority, Labor won 69 seats and crossbenchers won the remaining five. A redistribution in 2017/18 changed the representation entitlements. For the next election, the number of seats in the House will increase to 151, South Australia will lose a seat, Victoria and the Australian Capital Territory (ACT) will gain one seat each.

The following Mackerras pendulum shows the notional margins for seats following boundary redistributions in Victoria, Queensland, South Australia, Tasmania, the Northern Territory and the ACT. Based on ABC analyst Antony Green's calculations of the effect of boundary redistributions for the next election, and the outcome of the 2018 Wentworth by-election, the pendulum has the Coalition government on 73 of 151 seats with the Labor opposition on 72 seats and a crossbench of six seats.

Assuming a theoretical nationwide uniform swing, the Labor opposition would need at least 50.7% of the two-party vote (at least a 1.1-point two-party swing) to win 76 seats and majority government. The incumbent Coalition government no longer holds a majority, and would require at least 51.1% of the two-party vote (at least a 0.7-point two-party swing) to regain it.

== State of electorates ==
The following Mackerras pendulum lists seats in the House of Representatives according to the percentage-point margin they held on a two candidate preferred basis based on the 2016 election results. This is also known as the swing required for a seat to change hands.

Classification of seats as marginal, fairly safe or safe is applied by the independent Australian Electoral Commission using the following definition: "Where a winning party receives less than 56% of the vote, the seat is classified as 'marginal', 56–60% is classified as 'fairly safe' and more than 60% is considered 'safe'."

Government seats - 2016 (73)
| Seat | Member | Party | Margin |
Marginal
| Capricornia (Qld) | Michelle Landry | LNP | 50.6 |
| Forde (Qld) | Bert van Manen | LNP | 50.6 |
| Gilmore (NSW) | Ann Sudmalis | LIB | 50.7 |
| Flynn (Qld) | Ken O'Dowd | LNP | 51.0 |
^^^ Opposition wins majority on a uniform swing ^^^
| Robertson (NSW) | Lucy Wicks | LIB | 51.1 |
| Banks (NSW) | David Coleman | LIB | 51.4 |
| Petrie (Qld) | Luke Howarth | LNP | 51.6 |
| Dickson (Qld) | Peter Dutton | LNP | 52.0 |
| Hasluck (WA) | Ken Wyatt | LIB | 52.1 |
| Page (NSW) | Kevin Hogan | NAT | 52.3 |
| Boothby (SA) | Nicolle Flint | LIB | 52.8 |
| Dawson (Qld) | George Christensen | LNP | 53.3 |
| Chisholm (Vic) | Julia Banks (IND) | LIB | 52.9 |
| Bonner (Qld) | Ross Vasta | LNP | 53.4 |
| La Trobe (Vic) | Jason Wood | LIB | 53.5 |
| Pearce (WA) | Christian Porter | LIB | 53.6 |
| Swan (WA) | Steve Irons | LIB | 53.6 |
| Leichhardt (Qld) | Warren Entsch | LNP | 54.0 |
| Casey (Vic) | Tony Smith | LIB | 54.5 |
| Cowper (NSW) | Luke Hartsuyker | NAT v IND | 54.6 |
| Reid (NSW) | Craig Laundy | LIB | 54.7 |
| Sturt (SA) | Christopher Pyne | LIB | 55.8 |
| Brisbane (Qld) | Trevor Evans | LNP | 56.0 |
Fairly safe
| Stirling (WA) | Michael Keenan | LIB | 56.1 |
| Deakin (Vic) | Michael Sukkar | LIB | 56.1 |
| Canning (WA) | Andrew Hastie | LIB | 56.8 |
| Bowman (Qld) | Andrew Laming | LNP | 57.1 |
| Flinders (Vic) | Greg Hunt | LIB | 57.2 |
| Aston (Vic) | Alan Tudge | LIB | 57.6 |
| Menzies (Vic) | Kevin Andrews | LIB | 57.9 |
| Monash (Vic) | Russell Broadbent | LIB | 58.0 |
| Higgins (Vic) | Kelly O'Dwyer | LIB v GRN | 58.0 |
| Wide Bay (Qld) | Llew O'Brien | LNP | 58.3 |
| Hinkler (Qld) | Keith Pitt | LNP | 58.4 |
| Grey (SA) | Rowan Ramsey | LIB | 58.5 |
| Ryan (Qld) | Jane Prentice | LNP | 58.8 |
| Fisher (Qld) | Andrew Wallace | LNP | 59.2 |
| Hughes (NSW) | Craig Kelly | LIB | 59.3 |
| Wannon (Vic) | Dan Tehan | LIB | 59.3 |
| Wright (Qld) | Scott Buchholz | LNP | 59.6 |
| Bennelong (NSW) | John Alexander | LIB | 59.7 |
Safe
| Hume (NSW) | Angus Taylor | LIB | 60.2 |
| Fairfax (Qld) | Ted O'Brien | LNP | 61.0 |
| Moore (WA) | Ian Goodenough | LIB | 61.0 |
| Durack (WA) | Melissa Price | LIB | 61.1 |
| Tangney (WA) | Ben Morton | LIB | 61.1 |
| Fadden (Qld) | Stuart Robert | LNP | 61.2 |
| Warringah (NSW) | Tony Abbott | LIB v GRN | 61.6 |
| Lyne (NSW) | David Gillespie | NAT | 61.6 |
| McPherson (Qld) | Karen Andrews | LNP | 61.6 |
| Calare (NSW) | Andrew Gee | NAT | 61.8 |
| Forrest (WA) | Nola Marino | LIB | 62.6 |
| Goldstein (Vic) | Tim Wilson | LIB | 62.7 |
| Kooyong (Vic) | Josh Frydenberg | LIB | 62.8 |
| North Sydney (NSW) | Trent Zimmerman | LIB | 63.6 |
| Barker (SA) | Tony Pasin | LIB | 64.3 |
| Moncrieff (Qld) | Steven Ciobo | LNP | 64.5 |
| O'Connor (WA) | Rick Wilson | LIB | 65.0 |
| Parkes (NSW) | Mark Coulton | NAT | 65.1 |
| Groom (Qld) | John McVeigh | LNP | 65.3 |
| Cook (NSW) | Scott Morrison | LIB | 65.4 |
| Mackellar (NSW) | Jason Falinski | LIB | 65.7 |
| Maranoa (Qld) | David Littleproud | LNP v ONP | 65.9 |
| Berowra (NSW) | Julian Leeser | LIB | 66.4 |
| New England (NSW) | Barnaby Joyce | NAT | 66.4 |
| Riverina (NSW) | Michael McCormack | NAT | 66.4 |
| Mitchell (NSW) | Alex Hawke | LIB | 67.8 |
| Gippsland (Vic) | Darren Chester | NAT | 68.2 |
| Mallee (Vic) | Andrew Broad | NAT | 69.8 |
| Farrer (NSW) | Sussan Ley | LIB | 70.5 |
| Curtin (WA) | Julie Bishop | LIB | 70.7 |
| Bradfield (NSW) | Paul Fletcher | LIB | 71.0 |
| Nicholls (Vic) | Damian Drum | NAT | 72.3 |

Opposition seats - 2016 (72)
| Seat | Member | Party | Margin |
Marginal
| Herbert (Qld) | Cathy O'Toole | ALP | 50.02 |
| Corangamite (Vic) | Sarah Henderson (LIB) | ALP | 50.03 |
| Cooper (Vic) | Ged Kearney | ALP v GRN | 50.6 |
| Cowan (WA) | Anne Aly | ALP | 50.7 |
^^^ Government regains majority on a uniform swing ^^^
| Longman (Qld) | Susan Lamb | ALP | 50.8 |
| Lindsay (NSW) | Emma Husar | ALP | 51.1 |
| Dunkley (Vic) | Chris Crewther (LIB)^{[a]} | ALP | 51.3 |
| Macnamara (Vic) | Michael Danby | ALP | 51.3 |
| Griffith (Qld) | Terri Butler | ALP | 51.4 |
| Braddon (Tas) | Justine Keay | ALP | 51.5 |
| Macquarie (NSW) | Susan Templeman | ALP | 52.2 |
| Isaacs (Vic) | Mark Dreyfus | ALP | 52.3 |
| Eden-Monaro (NSW) | Mike Kelly | ALP | 52.9 |
| Perth (WA) | Patrick Gorman | ALP | 53.3 |
| Bendigo (Vic) | Lisa Chesters | ALP | 53.9 |
| Lyons (Tas) | Brian Mitchell | ALP | 54.0 |
| Moreton (Qld) | Graham Perrett | ALP | 54.0 |
| Richmond (NSW) | Justine Elliot | ALP | 54.0 |
| Hotham (Vic) | Clare O'Neil | ALP | 54.2 |
| Dobell (NSW) | Emma McBride | ALP | 54.8 |
| Wills (Vic) | Peter Khalil | ALP v GRN | 54.9 |
| Jagajaga (Vic) | Jenny Macklin | ALP | 55.0 |
| Bass (Tas) | Ross Hart | ALP | 55.3 |
| McEwen (Vic) | Rob Mitchell | ALP | 55.3 |
| Lilley (Qld) | Wayne Swan | ALP | 55.8 |
Fairly safe
| Solomon (NT) | Luke Gosling | ALP | 56.1 |
| Greenway (NSW) | Michelle Rowland | ALP | 56.3 |
| Burt (WA) | Matt Keogh | ALP | 57.1 |
| Ballarat (Vic) | Catherine King | ALP | 57.4 |
| Fremantle (WA) | Josh Wilson | ALP | 57.5 |
| Parramatta (NSW) | Julie Owens | ALP | 57.7 |
| Blair (Qld) | Shayne Neumann | ALP | 58.0 |
| Lingiari (NT) | Warren Snowdon | ALP | 58.1 |
| Hindmarsh (SA) | Steve Georganas | ALP | 58.2 |
| Werriwa (NSW) | Anne Stanley | ALP | 58.2 |
| Barton (NSW) | Linda Burney | ALP | 58.3 |
| Macarthur (NSW) | Mike Freelander | ALP | 58.3 |
| Corio (Vic) | Richard Marles | ALP | 58.3 |
| Kingsford Smith (NSW) | Matt Thistlethwaite | ALP | 58.6 |
| Bean (ACT) | Gai Brodtmann | ALP | 58.9 |
| Adelaide (SA) | Kate Ellis | ALP | 59.0 |
| Oxley (Qld) | Milton Dick | ALP | 59.1 |
| Maribyrnong (Vic) | Bill Shorten | ALP | 59.4 |
| Shortland (NSW) | Pat Conroy | ALP | 59.9 |
| Holt (Vic) | Anthony Byrne | ALP | 59.9 |
Safe
| Franklin (Tas) | Julie Collins | ALP | 60.7 |
| Paterson (NSW) | Meryl Swanson | ALP | 60.7 |
| Makin (SA) | Tony Zappia | ALP | 60.9 |
| Rankin (Qld) | Jim Chalmers | ALP | 61.3 |
| Brand (WA) | Madeleine King | ALP | 61.4 |
| Fenner (ACT) | Andrew Leigh | ALP | 61.6 |
| McMahon (NSW) | Chris Bowen | ALP | 62.1 |
| Hunter (NSW) | Joel Fitzgibbon | ALP | 62.5 |
| Canberra (ACT) | new seat | ALP | 63.2 |
| Cunningham (NSW) | Sharon Bird | ALP | 63.3 |
| Kingston (SA) | Amanda Rishworth | ALP | 63.5 |
| Whitlam (NSW) | Stephen Jones | ALP | 63.7 |
| Newcastle (NSW) | Sharon Claydon | ALP | 63.8 |
| Lalor (Vic) | Joanne Ryan | ALP | 64.4 |
| Gellibrand (Vic) | Tim Watts | ALP | 64.7 |
| Sydney (NSW) | Tanya Plibersek | ALP | 65.3 |
| Bruce (Vic) | Julian Hill | ALP | 65.7 |
| Grayndler (NSW) | Anthony Albanese | ALP v GRN | 65.8 |
| Fowler (NSW) | Chris Hayes | ALP | 67.5 |
| Watson (NSW) | Tony Burke | ALP | 67.6 |
| Spence (SA) | Nick Champion | ALP | 67.9 |
| Gorton (Vic) | Brendan O'Connor | ALP | 68.3 |
| Chifley (NSW) | Ed Husic | ALP | 69.2 |
| Blaxland (NSW) | Jason Clare | ALP | 69.5 |
| Calwell (Vic) | Maria Vamvakinou | ALP | 70.1 |
| Scullin (Vic) | Andrew Giles | ALP | 70.4 |
| Fraser (Vic) | New seat | ALP | 70.6 |
Crossbench seats - 2016 (6)
| Seat | Member | Party | Margin |
| Wentworth (NSW) | Kerryn Phelps | IND | 51.2 v LIB |
| Indi (Vic) | Cathy McGowan | IND | 54.1 v LIB |
| Mayo (SA) | Rebekha Sharkie | CA | 55.5 v LIB |
| Kennedy (Qld) | Bob Katter | KAP | 61.1 v LNP |
| Clark (Tas) | Andrew Wilkie | IND | 67.8 v ALP |
| Melbourne (Vic) | Adam Bandt | GRN | 69.0 v LIB |

=== Notes ===
^{a} Although the seats of Corangamite and Dunkley were Liberal wins at the previous election, the redistribution in Victoria changed them to notionally marginal Labor seats.

^{b} Julia Banks won Chisholm as a Liberal candidate, and quit the Liberal party to sit as an Independent. She is not recontesting Chisholm, but she is instead contesting Flinders.

^{c} Bean entirely consists of area from the pre-redistribution Canberra and can be considered a renaming of the seat, while the post redistribution seat of Canberra contains approximately as many voters from pre-redistribution Fenner as Canberra, and can be considered a new seat.
