= Re Day (No 2) =

Judgement of the High Court of Australia

- Court: High Court of Australia as the Court of Disputed Returns
- Full case name: In the matter of questions referred to the Court of Disputed Returns pursuant to section 376 of the Commonwealth Electoral Act 1918 (Cth) concerning Mr Robert John Day AO
- Decided: 5 April 2017
- Citation: [2017] HCA 14
- Transcripts: 21 Nov [2016] HCATrans 288; 21 Nov [2016] HCATrans 290; 12 Dec [2016] HCATrans 298; 17 Jan [2017] HCATrans 3; 20 Jan [2017] HCATrans 4; 23 Jan [2017] HCATrans 5; 23 Jan [2017] HCATrans 5; 24 Jan [2017] HCATrans 6; 7 Feb [2017] HCATrans 15; 11 Apr [2017] HCATrans 85; 19 Apr [2017] HCATrans 86

Case history
- Prior action: [2017] HCA 2

Court membership
- Judges sitting: Kiefel CJ, Bell, Gageler, Keane, Nettle, Gordon & Edelman JJ

Re Day (No 2) was a significant Australian court case, decided in the High Court of Australia sitting as the Court of Disputed Returns on 5 April 2017. The case was an influential decision concerning the construction of Section 44 of the Constitution and the meaning of "indirect pecuniary interest" in an agreement with the Commonwealth. The High Court held that Bob Day's re-election to the Senate in July 2016 was invalid, since he'd had an "indirect pecuniary interest" in an agreement with the Commonwealth since at least February 2016. As a result, he had not been eligible to sit as a Senator from at least February 2016 onward by reason of section 44(v) of the Constitution.

== Background ==
Day ran as a Family First Party South Australia Senate candidate at the 2013 federal election and was successful. On 1 November 2016, Day announced he had tendered his resignation to the President of the Australian Senate, with immediate effect, following the liquidation of Home Australia Group, a building company founded and managed by Day.

=== Constitutional validity of election ===
Shortly after Day's resignation, the government announced that it would move in the Senate to refer to the High Court the matter of the validity of Day's election in July 2016 in regard to a possible breach of section 44(v) of the Constitution, which provides that a person who "has any direct or indirect pecuniary interest in any agreement with the Public Service of the Commonwealth" (and s 44 continues) "shall be incapable of being chosen or of sitting" as a member of either house of the Parliament—and it follows that they are ineligible to be nominated for election to either house. The basis of the complaint was that, at Day's request, his Commonwealth-funded electorate office was by lease of part of a building in Adelaide that he indirectly owned, so that the Commonwealth's payments of rent would eventually come into a bank account of his own.

== Judgment ==
The High Court, sitting as the Court of Disputed Returns, held a preliminary hearing before Gordon J, whose judgment delivered on 27 January 2017 made numerous findings of fact. The case was heard on 7 February by a full court of the High Court, which delivered its judgment on 5 April.

The Court found that, since 26 February 2016 (although three judges were prepared to say 1 December 2015), Day had had an "indirect pecuniary interest" in an agreement with the Commonwealth, and thus was in violation of section 44(v). This was despite the fact that Commonwealth public servants, perceiving a conflict with section 44(v), had not made any payments of rent; Day's "interest" was constituted by his arranged entitlement to receive monies from any rent that was paid. Consequently, the Court found that Day was ineligible to serve in the Senate as of 26 February 2016, and he was therefore ineligible to nominate for the federal election of 2 July 2016. The Court declared Day's seat vacant and ordered that a special recount of South Australian ballot papers be held to determine his replacement, which the Court envisaged would be the other person on the Family First list in that election, Lucy Gichuhi.

== Aftermath ==
The Australian Labor Party lodged a challenge, claiming that Gichuhi might still be a citizen of Kenya, hence ineligible under Constitution section 44(i) as a citizen of a "foreign power". On 19 April 2017 a full court of the High Court, found that the objection had not been made out and declared Gichuhi elected.
