= Blundell v Vardon =

Judgement of the High Court of Australia

- Court: High Court of Australia as the Court of Disputed Returns
- Decided: 1 June 1907
- Citations: [1907] HCA 75, (1907) 4 CLR 1463

Court membership
- Judge sitting: Barton J

Case opinions
- The election of Vardon was absolutely void due to the default of electoral officers.

R v Governor of South Australia; Ex parte Vardon
- Court: High Court of Australia
- Full case name: The King v The Governor of the State of South Australia; Ex parte Vardon
- Decided: 8 August 1907
- Citations: [1907] HCA 31, (1907) 4 CLR 1497

Court membership
- Judges sitting: Griffith CJ, Barton, O'Connor, Isaacs & Higgins JJ

Case opinions
- The Governor of a State could not be commanded by a court to do an act which he can only do with the advice of the Executive Council. The Governor of a State, in issuing writs for an election, is not an officer of the Commonwealth within the meaning of section 75 of the Constitution.

Vardon v O'Loghlin
- Court: High Court of Australia
- Full case name: Vardon v O'Loghlin on a reference by the Senate of the Commonwealth
- Decided: 8 August 1907
- Citations: [1907] HCA 69, (1907) 5 CLR 201

Court membership
- Judges sitting: Griffith CJ, Barton, Isaacs & Higgins JJ

Case opinions
- The vacancy existing after the declaration by the Court of Disputed Returns was not a vacancy arising in the place of a senator before the expiration of his term of office within the meaning of sec. 15 of the Constitution, and, therefore, the choice or election of a senator by the State Parliament was void.

Blundell v Vardon, was the first of three decisions of the High Court of Australia concerning the 1906 election for senators for South Australia. Sitting as the Court of Disputed Returns, Barton J held that the election of Anti-Socialist Party candidate Joseph Vardon as the third senator for South Australia was void due to irregularities in the way the returning officers marked some votes. The Parliament of South Australia appointed James O'Loghlin. Vardon sought to have the High Court compel the governor of South Australia to hold a supplementary election, however the High Court held in R v Governor of South Australia; Ex parte Vardon that it had no power to do so. Vardon then petitioned the Senate seeking to remove O'Loghlin and rather than decide the issue, the Senate referred the matter to the High Court. The High Court held in Vardon v O'Loghlin that O'Loghlin had been invalidly appointed and ordered a supplementary election. Vardon and O'Loghlin both contested the supplementary election, with Vardon winning with 54% of the vote.

== The 1906 election ==
On 12 December 1906 there was an election in South Australia to choose three senators, (Note: Each original State was entitled to 6 senators, half of them elected each 3-year term.) to sit from 1 January 1907 to 31 December 1912. (Note: The terms were extended to 30 June 1913 pursuant to the 1906 referendum.) The method of Senate voting at the time, referred to as block voting, (Note: The block voting system regularly produces complete landslide majorities for the group of candidates with the highest level of support. e.g. in 1906 NSW and Queensland each elected 3 Anti-Socialist Senators while Western Australia elected 3 Labour Senators.) set out in section 150 and 158 of the Commonwealth Electoral Act 1902, to make a cross next to the name of the candidate. As there were three senators to be elected, each voter was required to mark three candidates, so that the total formal votes is divisible by three to show the number of voters. On this occasion in South Australia the block voting system did not result in the usual landslide majority for one party, with support divided among the various candidates.

Results
Candidate	Party	First count		Second count	
Candidate	Party	Votes	%	Votes	%
Sir Josiah Symon	Anti-Socialist Party	33,604	49.6	33,597	49.6
William Russell	Labour Party	31,793	46.9	31,796	46.9
Joseph Vardon	Anti-Socialist party	31,509	46.5	31,489	46.5
Dugald Crosby (Note: Crosby died shortly after the election.)	Labour Party	31,525	46.5	31,455	46.4
Reginald Blundell	Labour Party	31,337	46.2	31,366	46.3
David Charleston	Anti-Socialist party	30,615	45.2	30,608	45.2
Thomas Playford	Protectionist Party	12,938	19.1	13,035	19.2
Total formal		203,346		203,325	

After the first count, Crosby had a majority of just 16 votes. The electoral officer, at the request of Vardon, directed a recount, after which Vardon had a majority of 34 votes and the candidates declared to be elected on 8 January 1907 were Sir Josiah Symon, Russell, and Vardon.

The political context in the Senate was that the minority Protectionist government, with the support of Labour, had 18 of the 36 seats, while the Anti-Socialists had 16 seats, with the inclusion of Vardon. Thus the government could only expect a majority of votes, (Note: In the Senate questions are determined by a majority vote and the President is entitled to vote. If the votes are equal the motion fails: Constitution (Cth) s 23) with the support of the Labour leaning independent from Victoria, William Trenwith, (Note: William Trenwith, was a former trade union official and leader of the Victorian Labour Party who was an independent because of his refusal to pledge to vote as directed by the Labour Party.) or the conservative senator from Tasmania, Henry Dobson, who was elected as part of the Tariff Reform party. (Note: In 1906 Henry Dobson is generally counted among the Anti-Socialists.)

== Blundell v Vardon ==
Blundell filed a petition in the High Court, seeking a declaration that the election of Vardon was void and that either Crosby or himself should be declared to have been elected. The petition set out various grounds of irregularity said to have occurred in relation to the election. The petition initially sought to challenge the validity of the election of all senators, including Senator Sir Josiah Symon and Blundell's party colleague Senator Russell, however he was given leave to limit the petition to only challenge the election of Vardon.

The Court appointed the Deputy-Marshall to conduct a recount. During the recount, it was thought that the 9,000 votes cast in the Division of Angas had been accidentally destroyed. The missing votes were around 12.8% of the votes cast in the election. It would appear however that these votes were later found, although it is unknown what, if any, effect these missing votes would have had on the recount. The Deputy Marshall identified 828 votes of doubtful formality in several classes. The question for the court was whether the irregularities affected the result of the election. Barton J followed Chanter v Blackwood that focused on the disputed votes and the size of the majority, hence the attention in the judgement to the few hundred irregular votes and not the 9,000 missing votes.

Barton J went through each class, accepting most as valid votes, with Vardon in third place in front of Crosby by just two votes. 21 votes had rightfully been rejected because the presiding officer had initialled the votes in a place where the initials could not be seen on the folded ballot paper. Those 21 did not affect the result as 2 were for Vardon and none for Crosby. There were 185 votes that were rejected because they had not been initialled. Had these votes been valid, Vardon's majority of 2 would have been a minority of 4. Barton J held that the missing 9,000 votes were not shown to involve errors that would have been sufficient to affect the seats of Senator Sir Josiah Symon and Senator Russell. The identified errors by Returning Officers did however affect the outcome of the election for the third seat. On 1 June 1907 Barton J declared the election of Vardon to have been absolutely void, by reference to s205(iii) of the Commonwealth Electoral Act 1902.

=== Appointment of O'Loghlin ===
On 8 June 1907 the Attorney-General, Littleton Groom KC, set out that, in his opinion, section 13 of the Constitution, prevented a supplementary election being held, despite the words of s 205(iii) of the Commonwealth Electoral Act 1902. In his opinion the vacancy could only be filled, as a casual vacancy, by a joint sitting of the Parliament of South Australia in accordance with section 15 of the Constitution. In a subsequent opinion, the Attorney-General expressed a view that the original writ had been exhausted, that there was no power to issue a fresh writ and that in any event a fresh writ could only be issued by the governor of South Australia.

The governor of South Australia did not issue writs for a supplementary election and the Parliament of South Australia, led by Labour Party Premier Thomas Price, held a joint sitting in July 1907. Of the Labour Party candidates, Crosby had died and Blundell had been elected to the South Australian House of Assembly. O'Loghlin, previously a Labour Party member of the South Australian Legislative Council, was nominated. Vardon was also nominated, however the Parliament of South Australia appointed O'Loghlin. While the election was for a six-year term, because O'Loghlin was purportedly appointed to a casual vacancy under section 15 of the Constitution, he would only have held office until 30 June 1910.

The effect of the appointment of O'Loghlin was that the Protectionist Party, with the support of Labour had 19 of the 36 seats thus had a majority in the Senate without needing to rely on the support of Trenwith or Dobson.

== R v Governor of South Australia; Ex parte Vardon ==
Vardon applied to the High Court for a writ of mandamus compelling the governor of South Australia to appear before the court to show cause why they should not be commanded to issue a writ for a supplementary election. (Note: A writ of mandamus is one of the prerogative writs, which are traditionally brought in the name of the Monarch and the person who must show cause is named as the defendant. In this usage Ex parte means 'on the application of' rather than its other use as a case heard in the absence of a party. Thus the case name means the King (R) v the defendant (The Governor of the State of South Australia); on the application of (Ex parte) Vardon. The order to show cause is a rule nisi, if mandamus is granted, the rule is made absolute.) The governor argued, unsuccessfully, that the Commonwealth Attorney-General should not be permitted to intervene.

In a rare display of unity for the expanded court, the High Court gave a unanimous judgment, read by Barton J, in which it held that the governor was acting in the capacity of the Constitutional Head of the State and as such, the remedy for a failure to act by the governor was to be sought by the direct intervention of the Sovereign and not by recourse to a court of law. The governor could not be commanded to do an act which he could only do with the advice of the Executive Council. The Court held that the governor of a state was not an office of the Commonwealth within the meaning of section 75 of the Constitution, although nothing turned on this point as the High Court had jurisdiction to determine the question as a matter arising under the Constitution within the meaning of section 76(i). The Court declined to express any opinion about whether or not there was a vacancy as this was a matter for the Senate under Section 47 of the Constitution. (Note: This is consistent with Article 9 of the Bill of Rights 1689 which provided "That the freedom of speech and debates or proceedings in Parliament ought not to be impeached or questioned in any court or place out of Parliament.")

== Vardon v O'Loghlin ==
=== Senate Committee of disputed returns ===
O'Loghlin was sworn in as a senator and assumed his seat on 17 July 1907. Vardon followed the lead of the High Court and petitioned the Senate against the right of O'Loghlin to sit, vote, and act as a senator pursuant to section 47 of the Constitution. Section 47 provided that in relation to disputed elections :

Until the Parliament otherwise provides, any question respecting the qualification of a senator or of a member of the House of Representatives, or respecting a vacancy in either House of the Parliament, and any question of a disputed election to either House, shall be determined by the House in which the question arises.

Vardon's petition was referred to the Senate Committee of Disputed Returns and Qualifications, which consisted of two Labour senators, de Largie and Turley and five Anti-Socialist senators, Macfarlane, Colonel Neild, Sir Josiah Symon, Walker and Dobson. The Committee sat in camera before tabling a report. The report emphasised the need for senators to be "directly chosen by the people", to which the appointment to fill a casual vacancy was the exception. The Senate seat had not become vacant, but rather it had never been filled. The Committee rejected any suggestion that the expense of a supplementary election should be a consideration. The two Labour senators provided an addendum to the report that the question could only be resolved by reference to the High Court.

There was lengthy debate in the Senate on the matter, The Senate however did not decide to adopt or reject the report of the Committee, instead resolving, consistent with the addendum, that legislation be introduced to refer the matter to the High Court. Enabling legislation was subsequently passed by the Parliament, including a requirement that any hearing be in open court.

=== Petition referred to the High Court ===
Only Vardon and O'Loghlin were represented before the High Court. The primary argument put for Vardon before the High Court was the dominant requirement that senators be chosen by popular election. As the election of Vardon was void, he was never in office and the people were deprived of their choice. It was argued for O'Loghlin that, for reasons of expedition, convenience or economy, the Constitution postponed the direct choice of the people for an indirect choice through their representatives in State Parliament. Because Vardon had been sworn in as a senator and had assumed his seat, Vardon was a senator, as a question of fact. The declaration in Blundell v Vardon did not have effect until the date of the declaration.

The High Court declared that appointment of O'Loghlin by the Houses of Parliament of South Australia was void. The majority judgment of Griffith CJ, Barton and Higgins JJ held that section 7 of the Constitution, requiring senators to be directly chosen by the people of the State, was the 'dominant provision'. If the writs were returned, the election of the senators was necessarily valid for some purposes unless and until the election was successfully impeached. The High Court did not presume to question proceedings in parliament, holding that "the proceedings of the Senate as a House of Parliament are not invalidated by the presence of a senator without title." Section 15 of the Constitution presupposed a valid election and was not intended to apply to an abnormal event such as the failure to elect a senator.

Isaacs J gave a concurring judgment setting out his own reasons, in which he similarly emphasised the requirement of section 7 that the senators be directly chosen by the people, stating this was "more than a mere direction, more even than a simple mandate as to the mode of election; it describes the composition of the Houses themselves, so as to express the essential nature of these branches of the Parliament. Nothing could be more fundamental than the directly elective character of the two Houses."

"(Section) 15 of the Constitution was not framed with the object of meeting numerous instances of irregular Senate elections, but of providing for possible but rare contingencies of the abnormal termination of the service of senators; so rare that departures from the fundamental principles of representation through popular election would be really inappreciable because infrequent and possibly of short duration".

== 1908 supplementary election ==
The governor of South Australia issued a supplementary writ and an election was held on 15 February 1908. Only Vardon and O'Loghlin contested the election, and Vardon won comfortably.

1908 supplementary election: South Australia
Party	Candidate	Votes	%	±%
Anti-Socialist	Joseph Vardon	47,130	54.0	+7.5
Labour	James O'Loghlin	40,082	46.0	+46.0
Total formal votes		87,212		

== Aftermath ==
In light of the High Court decision the question raised whether Vardon, O'Loghlin or Albert Palmer, (Note: Albert Palmer was declared elected for the House of Representatives seat of Echuca however his election was declared void by the Court of Disputed Returns in Kennedy v Palmer (1907) 4 CLR 1481 and Palmer won the subsequent by-election.) were entitled to keep the allowances they had received whilst they sat in parliament. Groom KC, the Attorney-General, agreed with the opinions expressed by former Attorneys-General Drake, and Higgins, that a person whose election was void was not a member of the parliament during the period from election until the declaration and was not entitled to retain the amount paid by way of allowance. After Vardon was elected on 15 February 1908, he sought payment of the allowance from when the vacancy occurred, 1 January 1907. Groom KC was of the opinion that Vardon was only entitled to the allowance from 15 February 1908. The Parliament resolved the question by enacting legislation to legalise the payments that had been made to Vardon, O'Loghlin and Palmer.

The prediction of Isaacs J as to the frequency of irregular senate elections was not borne out in that the only other successful challenge to the Senate election itself, rather than the eligibility of particular candidates, was in Western Australia in 2013. By contrast there have been numerous appointments to casual vacancies in the Senate. The appointment of O'Loghlin remains the only occasion on which a matter has been referred to the Senate Committee of Disputed Returns and Qualifications. 1908 is the only occasion on which a partial supplementary election has been held for the Senate. This is because the introduction of the proportional representation system used in Senate elections since 1946, was inconsistent with a partial supplementary election as it is likely to result in a distortion of the voters' real intentions. (Note: A phrase which rose to prominence in Sykes v Cleary [1992] HCA 60, (1992) 176 CLR 77.) While the Commonwealth Electoral Act still provides for a partial failure of an election, the High Court held in Re Wood that a supplementary election for just one senate seat would be liable to frustrate the manifest purpose of the proportional voting scheme.
