= Chanter v Blackwood =

Judgement of the High Court of Australia

Chanter v Blackwood (No 1)
- Court: High Court of Australia as the Court of Disputed Returns
- Decided: 10 March 1904
- Citations: [1904] HCA 2, (1904) 1 CLR 39

Case history
- Subsequent actions: Chanter v Blackwood (No 2) [1904] HCA 48, (1904) 1 CLR 121; Chanter v Blackwood (No 3) [1904] HCA 18, (1904) 1 CLR 456

Court membership
- Judges sitting: Griffith CJ, Barton & O'Connor JJ

Maloney v McEacharn No 1
- Court: High Court of Australia as the Court of Disputed Returns
- Decided: 10 March 1904
- Citations: [1904] HCA 3, (1904) 1 CLR 77

Case history
- Subsequent action: Maloney v McEacharn No 2 (1904) 10 Argus LR (CN) 17

Court membership
- Judges sitting: Griffith CJ, Barton & O'Connor JJ

Chanter v Blackwood and the related case of Maloney v McEacharn were a series of decisions of the High Court of Australia, sitting as the Court of Disputed Returns arising from the 1903 federal election for the seats of Riverina and Melbourne in the House of Representatives. Chanter v Blackwood (No 1), and Maloney v McEacharn (No 1), determined questions of law as to the validity of certain votes. In Chanter v Blackwood (No 2) Griffith CJ held that 91 votes were invalid and because this exceeded the majority, the election was void, while Chanter v Blackwood (No 3) dealt with questions of costs. In Maloney v McEacharn (No 2) more than 300 votes were found to be invalid and the parties agreed it was appropriate for the election to be declared void.

== Background ==
Section 47 of the Constitution provides that disputed elections were to be determined by the relevant House of Parliament, "until the Parliament otherwise provides". Thus the challenges to the 1901 election for the House of Representatives were considered by the Committee of Elections and Qualifications and determined by a vote of the House. In 1902 the Parliament enacted the Commonwealth Electoral Act which established the High Court as the Court of Disputed Returns.

The first elections were conducted under the laws of the former colonies. The 1903 election however was conducted under the Commonwealth Electoral Act, and the related Commonwealth Franchise Act 1902 which gave Australian women the right to vote at a national level, and to stand for election to the Parliament. The process was that each elector was allocated to a particular polling place in the division and in the ordinary course would vote at that polling place by placing a cross opposite the name of the candidate they wished to vote for and their name would be marked off the roll. If the elector attended another polling place, they had to make a declaration and the vote was sent to the designated polling place for that elector. The system was thereby designed as a check to prevent a person from voting more than once in the election. An elector could in limited circumstances apply for a postal vote. What happened in these cases was that electors attending another polling place were not given ordinary ballot papers, but instead were given a blank ballot paper to write down the name of the candidate they wished to vote for.

=== Riverina ===
John Chanter was a Protectionist, who supported the first Prime Minister, Edmund Barton, and had won the seat of Riverina at the 1901 election. At the 1903 election there was one other candidate, Robert Blackwood, representing the Free Trade Party. Blackwood won the election with a majority of just 5 votes. Chanter challenged the election result on the grounds that included:

- Ballot papers had been improperly rejected because the cross was not within the square on the ballot paper;
- Absentee ballots had been improperly received because they only contained the name of one candidate;
- Blackwood had engaged in illegal practices in supplying meat, drink and entertainment to influence the votes of electors and dismissing his cook for supporting Chanter.

=== Melbourne ===
Sir Malcolm McEacharn was also a Protectionist and had won the seat of Melbourne at the 1901 election, comfortably defeating the Labour Party candidate William Maloney. At the 1903 election McEacharn again defeated Maloney, but with a much reduced majority of 77 votes. Maloney challenged the election result on the grounds that included:

- Postal votes had been improperly received because they were not signed in the presence of a Returning Officer or other specified person; and
- Absentee ballots had been improperly received because they only contained the name of one candidate.

One of the curious circumstances of this seat was that it was a contest between the Protectionist and Labour parties where the Protectionist Deakin Government held office with the support of Labour.

== Chanter v Blackwood ==
Chanter v Blackwood (No 1) concerned legal questions that Griffith CJ, as the trial judge, had referred to the full court to be answered as a stated case.

=== Formality of ballot papers ===
Griffith CJ held that the provision of section 133 of the Commonwealth Electoral Act, was not mandatory and it was sufficient if the ballot paper substantially complied, noting that the consequences of a ballot being informal would be to deprive the elector of his vote. Barton J similarly emphasised the desirability of not disenfranchising voters for the slightest slip, provided the intention of the voter was clearly expressed. O'Connor J dissented, holding that it was mandatory for the cross to be placed within the square. The judges were unanimous in holding that striking out the name of a candidate not voted for did not make the ballot informal.

=== Absentee voters ===
The court was unanimous in holding that the Commonwealth Electoral Act required the ballots to have the name of each candidate and that the blank ballots with just one name written on them were invalid. The reasons for this conclusion were more fully set out in the judgment of Griffith CJ in Maloney v McEacharn.

=== Illegal practices ===
The question considered by the Court was whether a candidate guilty of an illegal practice as defined in the Commonwealth Electoral Act was disqualified from being elected. Griffith CJ held that Parliament had prescribed the remedies for illegal practices and that did not include automatic disqualification from sitting. Barton J held that a single act of bribery did not disqualify a candidate, unless the corrupt practices might have affected the result of the election. O'Connor J held that there was no power under the Commonwealth Electoral Act to disqualify a candidate on the ground of misconduct, no matter how great. Both Griffith CJ and O'Connor J expressed the view, obiter dicta, that conviction for an offence punishable by imprisonment for one year was sufficient to disqualify a person from sitting under Section 44 of the Constitution even if the person was not ultimately sentenced to imprisonment.

=== Chanter v Blackwood No 2 and No 3 ===
Having answered the separate legal questions, Griffiths CJ then conducted a trial in which he ruled on each of the disputed categories of votes. The result of this recount was that Chanter should have been elected by a majority of 67 votes. His Honour held however that 91 people had voted who had no right to do so. It was impossible to trace the improper votes and they outnumbered Chanter's majority on the recount, thus the improper votes might have affected the result of the election. Accordingly Griffith CJ held that the election was void and there should be a by-election for the seat.

The matter returned yet again to the Court on 16 August 1904 where Griffith CJ held that Chanter should be reimbursed his costs of travelling to Melbourne for the hearing, even though he was not required to give evidence.

== Maloney v McEacharn ==
Maloney v McEacharn (No 1) also concerned legal questions that Griffith CJ, as the trial judge, had referred to the full court to be answered as a stated case.

=== Postal votes ===
A large number of postal votes had not been not signed in the presence of a Returning Officer, Electoral Registrar, Justice of the Peace, School Teacher, or a Postmaster. Griffith CJ held that an elector was generally required to vote at the polling place for which he was enrolled. The privilege of voting elsewhere was subject to compliance with conditions that were intended to prevent fraudulent votes. The attestation of postal votes was a safeguard against fraud. Barton J expressed his reluctance in concluding that electors were disenfranchised despite doing their best to comply with the Act. Postal votes stretched the secrecy of the ballot and had the potential for fraud, thus requiring vigilance and the safeguards provided for by the Act. O'Connor J similarly held that postal votes gave the greatest opportunity for fraud, being probably made "amongst people who cannot identify him and who know nothing about the form in which his name appears on the electoral roll" in which the legislature had been careful to enact safeguards.

=== Absentee votes ===
Griffith CJ noted that the regulations required the ballot-papers to be in the ordinary form however the names of the candidates may be written instead of printed and that the elector was required to make a cross opposite the name of the candidate voted for. Because the names of all candidates did not appear on the ballot paper the elector could not comply with the condition and the votes must therefore be rejected. Barton and O'Connor JJ agreed with Griffith CJ.

=== Maloney v McEacharn No 2 ===
The votes found to be invalid were 300 of the 600 postal votes and all of the 66 absentee votes. There was some debate as to the cause of the errors in the postal votes, during which Griffith CJ expressed a tentative view that if a vote was invalid because of an elector's error then that was misfortune, for the elector and the candidate, however errors by an official were matters that may make the election void. In the end both candidates agreed that in light of the large number of errors it was appropriate for the election to be declared void and for there to be by-election for the seat.

== Aftermath ==
A by-election for the seat of Melbourne was held on 30 March 1904 where Maloney comfortably defeated McEacharn with a majority of 859 votes. A by-election for the seat of Riverina was held on 30 March 1904 where Chanter defeated Blackwood with a majority of 393 votes. Blackwood is said to have later been cleared of all allegations.

Chanter would later disparage the delay and costs of disputing elections in the High Court, while both Chanter and Maloney pressed for greater scrutiny of the election expenses incurred by candidates.

The outcome of the High Court's emphasis on the extent to which errors or illegal practice may have affected the outcome of the election, is that only close contests give rise to petitions. Further the costs involved mean that serious challenges to the election results are run only by the major parties.
