= Court of Disputed Returns (Australia) =

Special electoral jurisdiction of the High Court of Australia

- Interactive map of Court of Disputed Returns
- 35°17′56″S 149°08′08″E
- Jurisdiction: Australia
- Location: Canberra, Australian Capital Territory
- Coordinates: 35°17′56″S 149°08′08″E
- Composition method: Vice-regal appointment upon Prime Ministerial nomination, following advice of Attorney-General and Cabinet
- Authorised by: Parliament of Australia via the Commonwealth Electoral Act 1918 (Cth)
- Judge term length: Until age of 70 years

Chief Justice of Australia
- Currently: Stephen Gageler
- Since: 6 November 2023

The Court of Disputed Returns is a special jurisdiction of the High Court of Australia. The High Court, sitting as the Court of Disputed Returns, hears challenges regarding the validity of federal elections. The jurisdiction is twofold: (1) on a petition to the Court by an individual with a relevant interest or by the Australian Electoral Commission, or (2) on a reference by either house of the Commonwealth Parliament. This jurisdiction was initially established by Part XVI of the Commonwealth Electoral Act 1902 and is now contained in Part XXII of the Commonwealth Electoral Act 1918. Challenges regarding the validity of state elections are heard by the supreme court of that state, sitting as that state's court of disputed returns.

== Constitutional background ==
A Court of Disputed Returns is a court, tribunal or some other body that determines disputes about elections in some common law countries, including the former Australian colonies. This jurisdiction of the courts evolved in England (and later in the United Kingdom), as a part of the struggle between the Crown and Parliament, and was largely settled in 1868 when the House of Commons gave the courts of common law jurisdiction to determine disputed returns. The Australian colonies enacted legislation based on the Parliamentary Elections Act 1868 (UK). At the constitutional conventions that led to federation of the Australian colonies in 1901, it was decided that election disputes would be determined by the courts, but the manner in which this was to be achieved was left to the new parliament.

The Constitution of Australia, in sections 73–76, provides the High Court of Australia with original and appellate jurisdiction, and also empowers the Commonwealth parliament to provide additional original jurisdiction. Constitution s 47 more specifically empowers the Parliament to provide that questions of members' qualifications, of vacancies in either house and of disputed elections shall be determined otherwise than by the house in which they have arisen—which Constitution s 49 states to be the position inherited from the Parliament of the United Kingdom. In 1902 the Parliament provided that the High Court would be the federal Court of Disputed Returns. This jurisdiction is now provided in Part XXII of the Commonwealth Electoral Act 1918. (Note: Prior to 16 July 2001, the High Court could refer federal electoral disputes to the Supreme Court of a state: Electoral and Referendum Amendment Act (No 1) 2001 No. 34 (Cth) Disputes regarding a State election are determined by the Supreme Court of that State, as the State's Court of Disputed Returns.)

There has been debate as to whether the determination of disputed returns is consistent with the constitutional role of the High Court in exercising judicial power.

The power of the Court of Disputed Returns was brought to the attention of the public following the 2013 federal election in which the Australian Electoral Commission lost 1,370 ballot papers in Western Australia. Sitting as the Court of Disputed Returns, the High Court declared the Senate election in Western Australia as void, and ordered a special election.

In 2017 there was a series of parliamentary references to the Court of Disputed Returns, to determine the eligibility of a number of members of parliament found or alleged to be dual citizens, contrary to Constitution s 44(i).

== Procedure ==
The Commonwealth Electoral Act 1918, which governs federal elections, provides the High Court with a jurisdiction as the federal Court of Disputed Returns.

=== Petition by individual or AEC ===
A candidate, or any person who had been qualified to vote in the election, may challenge the result, by a petition to the High Court as the Court of Disputed Returns. The petition must be filed within 40 days. The Court can refer all or part of a matter to the Federal Court of Australia, but will itself determine questions of validity. A petition can also be filed by the Australian Electoral Commission. The requirement that a person be entitled to vote at the specific election means that the Court of Disputed Returns does not have the jurisdiction to declare that the entirety of a general election was void. Any other person who was entitled to vote at the election may be heard in relation to the petition.

The admissible grounds for a petition are whatever "the Court in its discretion thinks just and sufficient", but are specified to include "illegal practices ... committed in connexion with the election". "Illegal practices" are defined as actual or attempted "bribery and undue influence" by a successful candidate, who may then be criminally prosecuted; but, unless there is actual or attempted "bribery or corruption" by the candidate or with their knowledge and approval, the Court has to be "satisfied that the result of the election was likely to be affected, and that it is just that the candidate should be declared not to be duly elected or that the election should be declared void". Electoral officers' administrative errors will not matter unless they have affected the result. A complaint about being prevented from voting will require proof of the person's eligibility to vote and of their attempt to do so.

The Court is empowered to compel production of documents and attendance of witnesses, and to examine witnesses on oath. However, the Court "must make its decision on a petition as quickly as is reasonable in the circumstances", it is not bound by strict rules of evidence, and all of its decisions "shall be final and conclusive and without appeal, and shall not be questioned in any way" (thus there is no recourse to the High Court in its other capacities or to the Parliament).

A decision of the Court of Disputed Returns may be made by a single judge, but an issue of constitutional interpretation is likely to be determined by the Full Court. The Court may dismiss or uphold a petition in whole or in part and, if upholding it, will declare:

- that a person who was returned as elected was not duly elected, upon which that person will cease to be a member of the Parliament; or
- that a candidate is duly elected who was not returned as elected, upon which that person may take their seat; or
- that an election is absolutely void, in which case a new election is to be held.

Costs will be as in ordinary proceedings in the High Court. The Court may order all or any costs to be paid by the Commonwealth or by "any unsuccessful party to the petition".

=== Parliamentary reference ===
In addition, there may be a reference by resolution of either house of the parliament on "[a]ny question respecting the qualifications of a Senator or of a Member of the House of Representatives or respecting a vacancy in either House of the Parliament". The reference (commonly termed a referral) is communicated to the Court by, as appropriate, the Speaker of the House of Representatives or the President of the Senate. (Note: Media reports in 2017 that a member has "referred her/himself" are inaccurate; the member has requested (or acquiesced in) a motion for reference by the house in which they sit.) There is no time limit, but in other respects the procedure is the same as with a petition, although the Court may also allow or request other persons to be heard. The Court is empowered to declare:

(a) that any person was not qualified to be a Senator or a Member of the House of Representatives;
(b) that any person was not capable of being chosen or of sitting as a Senator or a Member of the House of Representatives; and
(c) that there is a vacancy in the Senate or in the House of Representatives.

In practice, the references request the Court to determine how a vacancy so arising should be filled. The full Court may order a recount and appoint one member of the Court to supervise the process and confirm the result.

Unlike an election petition there is no general right to be heard, a person must obtain leave of the Court. Thus in relation to the eligibility questions referred to the Court in 2017, in addition to the member of parliament and the Attorney General, only Tony Windsor, the unsuccessful candidate for New England, was given leave to appear. All other applications for leave were refused.

== Early cases (1901–1949) ==
The following cases were determined by the Court of Disputed Returns. It does not include numerous cases such as Sarina v O'Connor (1946) where the petition was withdrawn or dismissed by consent.

=== 1903 Election ===
The first case heard by the Court of Disputed Returns was Chanter v Blackwood, in which John Chanter challenged the election of Robert Blackwood. The Court had to consider the validity of votes, and whether they had been properly accepted or rejected, and the extent to which disputed votes were proved to have affected the result of the election, by reference to section 200 of the Commonwealth Electoral Act 1902. The High Court emphasised the extent to which errors or illegal practice may have affected the outcome of the election, with the effect that only close contests give rise to petitions. Further the costs involved mean that serious challenges to the election results are run only by the major parties.

Maloney v McEacharn was a related case, in which William Maloney challenged the election of Sir Malcolm McEacharn. The main issue concerned the validity of postal votes that had not been signed in the presence of a Returning Officer or other specified person. The 300 invalid votes affected the outcome where McEachern had a majority of only 77 votes.

Hirsch v Phillips was decided two days after Chanter v Blackwood, where Max Hirsch challenged the election of Pharez Phillips. The challenge was based on the fact that a polling booth at Ni Ni, was not open on the polling day. At the time electors were allocated to a polling booth and were expected to vote there, although they could vote at another polling booth if they made a declaration that they were the person enrolled to vote, that they had not voted elsewhere and promised not to vote at any other polling place. The polling booth at Ni Ni was opened one week later however voters registered at other polling places were not permitted to vote. Griffith CJ delivered the decision of the Court that a person who was absent on the original polling day was and remained entitled to vote at another polling place and there were no words to take that right away from them. Having established the points of principle, the petition was heard by Griffiths CJ. Phillips’ majority was 167 and so Hirsch needed to bring evidence that at least 167 voters had been prevented from voting at Ni Ni to prove that their exclusion may have affected the result. Griffiths CJ dismissed the petition by consent.

Cameron v Fysh concerned the challenge by Norman Cameron against the election of Sir Philip Fysh with a majority of 31 votes. While Cameron alleged illegal practices, Griffith CJ held that there was no evidence that Fysh was responsible for any illegal practices, nor that undue influence affected enough votes to have affected the result of the election.

=== 1906 Election ===
Barton J held in Blundell v Vardon, that the election of Anti-Socialist Party candidate Joseph Vardon as the third senator for South Australia was void due to irregularities in the way the returning officers marked some votes. The Parliament of South Australia appointed James O'Loghlin. Vardon sought to have the High Court compel the Governor of South Australia to hold a supplementary election, however the High Court held in R v Governor of South Australia; Ex parte Vardon that it had no power to do so. Vardon then petitioned the Senate seeking to remove O'Loghlin and rather than decide the issue, the Senate referred the matter to the High Court. The Court held in Vardon v O'Loghlin that O'Loghlin had been invalidly appointed and ordered a supplementary election. Vardon and O'Loghlin both contested the supplementary election, with Vardon winning with 54% of the vote.

Kennedy v Palmer, was a challenge by Thomas Kennedy against the election of Albert Palmer with a majority of 37 votes. Barton J held that the election was void due to irregularities in the way the returning officers marked some votes and Palmer won the by-election.

=== Crouch v Ozanne (1910) ===
Richard Crouch challenged the election of Alfred Ozanne. The first challenge was that Ozanne had attempted to bribe an elector by offering a silk dress if she voted for him. If bribery had been proven that would have been sufficient to void the election. O'Connor J held that the comment was merely a joke. In relation to the other challenges, O'Connor J held that while it was established that irregularities had occurred, these were insufficient to affect the result of the election where Ozanne had a majority of 1,645.

=== Hedges v Burchell (1913) ===
William Hedges challenged the election of Reginald Burchell, alleging that duplicate voting had taken place. Hedges sought to inspect the electoral rolls used at the election. Barton ACJ held the Court of Disputed Returns did not have the power to require the Chief Electoral Officer to produce the documents to be inspected by Hedges. (Note: The Court's power is now provided for in Commonwealth Electoral Act 1918 (Cth) s 360. See Mitchell v Bailey [2008] FCA 426 at [8]-[11].)

=== Kean v Kerby (1919) ===
John Kean challenged the election of Nationalist Edwin Kerby, who had defeated Labor's Charles McGrath by just 1 vote. Isaacs J held that there were a great number of official errors causing disfranchisement of electors. This included the "almost incredible carelessness" on the part of more than 20 local Presiding Officers who had certified that the voter had signed the declaration before him in circumstances where the voter had not signed the declaration at all. The election was declared void and McGrath defeated Kerby in a by-election.

=== Porter's telegram (1922) ===
John Porter (Note: Porter, a journalist for the Northern Territory Times and Gazette, was the secretary of the Northern Territory Representation League.) challenged the election of Harold Nelson for the newly created representative for the Northern Territory. People in the Northern Territory lost their ability to vote for a representative in 1911 when the Northern Territory was transferred from South Australia. The Northern Territory Representation Act 1922, gave the Territory a representative, a position derisively referred to as a 'parliamentary eunuch', as the representative could speak but not vote in Parliament. Darwin was an isolated town, overland access was by a dirt track that was rutted and often impassable, (Note: An all-weather sealed road was not built until 1940: "History of Roads in Australia". Year Book Australia, 1974. Australian Bureau of Statistics. 25 January 1974.) with no railway, (Note: Despite the Commonwealth's promise in 1911, the railway did not reach Alice Springs until 1929 and the Adelaide–Darwin railway was not complete until 2003: "Completion of the Adelaide to Darwin railway line". Australian Bureau of Statistics. 8 December 2006.) nor airmail service. (Note: Airmail to Darwin commenced in 1934 as part of the Brisbane to England service: Lee, Robert (2001). "Linking a Nation: Australia's Transport and Communications 1788 – 1970 Chapter 8".) The Overland Telegraph was an important means of communication in the northern Territory, to the extent that it was reported that nominations of candidates could be made by telegraph.

The grounds of the challenge were that (1) Asian and pacific islander people had voted without being naturalised Australians; (Note: The White Australia policy was part of the platform of the Northern Territory Representation League.) (2) that ballot papers were inconsistently treated; (3) that an unqualified person had purported to witness postal votes; (5) that there was a reduced turnout in some subdivisions due to the wet season and the difficulty of obtaining qualified witnesses. Porter purported to lodge his petition by telegram.

The High Court did not consider the grounds of the petition, holding there was no valid petition as a telegram was not an original document signed and attested to be true.

=== 1928 Victorian Senate Election ===
The 1928 election was a half senate election in which 3 senators were to be elected for Victoria. 6 candidates were nominated, however Maj Gen John Forsyth died before the ballot. Most ballot papers were reprinted with just the 5 remaining candidates. The Labor how-to-vote card had Forsyth listed as No. 5 and more than 11,000 ballots had numbered the candidates 1, 2, 3, 4 & 6. The 2 unsuccessful Labor candidates, Albert Blakey and Edward Findley, challenged the election of Harry Lawson (Nationalist Party) and Robert Elliott (Country Party) on the grounds that these 11,000 votes had been rejected as informal. Starke J held that while the voters preferences were clear, the Electoral Act "absolutely and imperatively" required that a voter use consecutive numbers so that the votes were properly rejected as informal.

=== Perkins v Cusack (1929) ===
John Perkins challenged the election of John Cusack who had defeated Perkins, the sitting member, with a majority of 40 votes. Perkins alleged that (1) a parcel of 50 ballot papers had been tampered with, removing votes for Perkins and replacing them with votes for Cusack; and (2) people had been enrolled in Eden-Monaro despite their registered address being outside the division. Starke J held that the counting of the votes for Perkins had been an honest mistake and there was no evidence of vote tampering. The challenge to the addresses of voters was a challenge to the correctness of the electoral roll, and the Court of Disputed Returns was forbidden from considering the correctness of the roll.

== 1950–1999 ==
=== Crittenden v Anderson (1950) ===
Henry Crittenden challenged the 1949 election of Gordon Anderson on the grounds that (1) as a Roman Catholic, Anderson owed allegiance to the Vatican State and was therefore disqualified by section 44(i) of the Constitution and (2) the general advertising expenses incurred by the Labor Party exceeded the £250 per candidate election expenses permitted. Fullagar J held the petition had no prospects of success and observed that the effect of the petition would be to impose a religious test for parliamentarians contrary to Section 116 of the Constitution.

=== Cole v Lacey (1965) ===
George Cole sought to challenge the 1964 Senate Election for Tasmania in which Bert Lacey was returned for the 5th and final seat. The petition alleged that the percentage of votes rejected during the scrutiny was considerably lower than that "in other States" and also "below that of informal votes in previous elections for the Senate in Tasmania". Taylor J held that it was "impossible to say that, having regard to the percentage of informal votes recorded at the election now in question, informal votes were admitted and counted or that it is probable that this occurred" and dismissed the petition.

=== Re Webster (1975) ===
Senator James Webster who was a shareholder in and managing director of a company founded by his late grandfather. The company supplied timber and hardware, by public tender, to both the Postmaster-General's Department and the Department of Housing and Construction. The Senate referred the question of whether he was disqualified from sitting as having a pecuniary interest in an agreement with the Commonwealth to the Court of Disputed Returns. Barwick CJ considered the history of the section and its predecessors, describing it as a vestigial part of the constitution. In his view, it had been inserted not to "protect the public against fraudulent conduct of members of the House", but rather to protect the independence of the parliament against influence by the Crown. Barwick CJ took a narrow approach to the construction of section 44(v), concluding that a person was disqualified if "that person could conceivably be influenced by the Crown in relation to Parliamentary affairs."

=== Berrill's challenges ===
Helen Berrill unsuccessfully challenged the results of three elections. The challenge to the 1975 Senate Election for South Australia was that large numbers of voters had been disenfranchised by having their names removed from the electoral roll. The Court followed its decision in Perkins v Cusack that it was forbidden from considering the correctness of the roll in determining a disputed election. Ms Berrill's challenge to the 1977 election for the seat of Boothby was dismissed because the petition did not plead the facts alleged to have constituted breaches of the Electoral Act. Ms Berrill alleged that the entire 1983 Election was invalid because of irregularities in the electoral rolls. Mason J noted that the legislative policy that the Electoral Rolls were a conclusive record of the persons entitled to vote was "the product of the controversial and unsatisfactory history of Parliamentary review of disputed elections" and dismissed the petition.

=== Evans v Crichton-Browne (1981) ===
These were challenges to the 1980 election of three Liberal Party members, Noel Crichton-Browne as a senator for Western Australia, Sir William McMahon as the member for Lowe and Grant Chapman as the member for Kingston. The petition alleged that they had published misleading campaign material, including statements that "a vote for the Australian Democrats could be a vote for the Labor Party and could give the Labor Party control of the Senate" and that "the Labor Party was committed to the introduction of a wealth tax or capital gains tax" and that this misleading material was contrary to the Electoral Act. In a joint judgment the Court held at paragraph 13 that the section referred to "the act of recording or expressing the political judgment which the elector has made rather than to the formation of that judgment".

=== Robert Wood (1987) ===
Robert Wood was elected as a Senator for NSW in 1987. The Call to Australia party's Elaine Nile challenged his election on 4 grounds: (1) that "His actions against the vessels of a friendly nation indicate allegiance, obedience or adherence to a foreign power"; (2) Wood had served a term of imprisonment in 1972, (Note: Wood was gaoled for one month in 1972 for refusing to be conscripted to fight in the Vietnam War.) (3) had been convicted of obstructing shipping in 1987; (Note: Wood was fined $120 for paddling a kayak in front of the USS Joseph Strauss in Sydney Harbour.) and (4) Wood was insolvent. (Note: Wood being described as "probably the only Member of Parliament to have been elected while on the dole".)

The High Court, Brennan, Deane and Toohey JJ, dismissed the petition in December 1987 on technical grounds. The brief judgment made a number of observations about section 44 of the Constitution, relevantly including that the allegation of allegiance to a foreign power did not identify the foreign power nor identify any acknowledgement of that allegiance. The Court observed that disqualification was not simply for the conviction of an offence: the offence must be punishable by imprisonment for one year or more. Similarly it was not enough to allege that Wood was insolvent; he had to have been adjudged to be an "undischarged insolvent".

The Commonwealth Electoral Act 1918 provided that a candidate must be an Australian citizen. and it was later discovered that Wood wasn't a citizen at the time of his election. The High Court unanimously held that he had never been validly elected. The High Court expressly declined to rule on the question of whether being a dual citizen would also disqualify a candidate from election.

=== Sykes v Cleary (1992) ===
Phil Cleary won the 1992 by-election for the Victorian seat of Wills. Sykes claimed that Cleary, a permanent secondary school teacher in the Victorian public school system, was disqualified as the holder of an "office of profit under the Crown", contrary to Constitution s 44(iv), and that two other candidates were also disqualified since each was a citizen of a foreign power, contrary to Constitution s 44(i). A 6:1 majority of the High Court held in Sykes v Cleary that Cleary held an "office of profit under the Crown" as permanent employee of government. The other candidates had emigrated to Australia and become citizens. A 5:2 majority of the Court held that dual citizens are disqualified unless they have "taken reasonable steps" to renounce their foreign citizenship. Renunciation procedures had been available to the two candidates, but neither of them had taken any such step.

=== 1993 election ===
There was a flurry of activity in relation to the 1993 election, with petitions lodged, each of which were heard by a single judge and dismissed. Brennan J held that "the jurisdiction of the Court of Disputed Returns does not extend to the making of a declaration that the entirety of a general election is void". Toohey J agreed. In two separate decisions, Dawson J also agreed. Ian Sykes had sought to challenge the entirety of the general election on the grounds that the candidate declaration contained a double negative, that the candidate was not incapable of being chosen. Dawson J held that even if the statement contained a double negative, it was not unclear or uncertain. The challenge to the election of Michael Lee was an allegation that Lee had misused his parliamentary postal allowance for party political business. Gaudron J held that the allegation was not a breach of the Electoral Act and so was not a ground on which an election could be declared to be invalid or void.

Alasdair Webster challenged the election of Maggie Deahm as the member for Macquarie by a margin of 105 votes. Webster made 22 allegations of irregularities, including widespread electoral fraud and that an advertisement mislead the voters that Deahm was a Democrat Candidate. Gaudron J dismissed all but 3 of the allegations, including a finding that the advertisement must be read as a whole. The allegations that remained concerned allegations of multiple voting and personation. After the Electoral Commission had investigated the errors made in marking of the certified lists Webster accepted that the additional marks were explicable as scanning errors. Gaudron J dismissed the petition, ordering that the Electoral Commission bear its own costs because of its own errors, however Webster was required to pay the costs of Deahm.

=== 1996 election ===
Ross Free challenged the election of Jackie Kelly on the grounds that at the time of her nomination she was (1) a dual citizen of Australia and New Zealand and (2) a full-time officer of the RAAF. Brennan J declined to refer the matter to the Full Court to reconsider the correctness of the decision in Sykes v Cleary that a recount for a lower house seat "could result in a distortion of the voters' real intentions". Kelly subsequently conceded that she was incapable of being chosen because she was a full-time officer of the RAAF, a concession that meant the Court did not need to consider the question of her dual citizenship. There is some question as to the position of the RAAF as it can be comfortably read as part of the military forces, but it is harder to include it in the expression "navy or army". Blackshield has suggested that Kelly's concession may have been greater than was necessary. Kelly won the subsequent by-election with an increased margin.

Warren Snowdon challenged the election of Nick Dondas on the grounds that certain provisional votes should have been counted rather than rejected. The issue concerned electors who changed address without notifying the AEC. The vast majority of voters were not disenfranchised if their new address was within the same electoral division. The exceptions were the divisions of Kalgoorlie and Northern Territory which were divided into sub-divisions due to their large geographic area. The AEC has said that the problem was acute in the Northern Territory because of its large and highly mobile aboriginal population. The Court held that the proper construction of the Electoral Act was that electors who moved to a different subdivision were not entitled to be reinstated to the electoral roll. The Joint Standing Committee on Electoral Matters recommended "that the Electoral Act be amended to allow the reinstatement of provisional votes where an elector has moved between subdivisions in the Northern Territory or Kalgoorlie, but has remained within the relevant division." The Electoral Act was subsequently amended to allow a person who changed sub-divisions to be reinstated to the roll.

The other unsuccessful petition was John Abbotto who challenged the Senate election in Victoria on the grounds that the "above the line" way of voting discriminated against ungrouped Senate candidates. Dawson J followed previous judgements that (1) the Court of Disputed Returns had no power to declare the entire half-Senate election to be void, and (2) that the above the line voting did not "so [offend] democratic principles as to render the sections beyond the power of the Parliament to enact" and the petition was eventually dismissed on 3 June 1997, more than 12 months after the election.

=== 1998 election ===
Henry Sue and Terry Sharples challenged the 1998 Senate election for Queensland of Heather Hill on the grounds that she was incapable of being chosen as a senator under section 44(i) of the Constitution as she was a dual citizen of Australia and the United Kingdom and that the United Kingdom was a foreign power. The Court held in Sue v Hill, that the United Kingdom no longer retained any legislative, executive or judicial influence over Australia and was therefore a foreign power. Ms Hill was therefore incapable of being chosen as a Senator.

The other challenge to the 1998 Senate election for Queensland was the petition of Mr Ditchburn that the above the line voting system meant that the Senators were not "directly chosen by the people of the State" contrary to section 7 of the Constitution. This petition was dismissed by Hayne J. Mr Ditchburn ran the same argument again in 2002 with the same result. Hayne J dismissed a similar petition by Mr McLure in relation to the 1998 Senate election for Victoria.

== Recent cases ==
=== Federal Court ===
Prior to 1998 the Electoral Act permitted matters to be referred to a State Supreme Court, however the High Court had never done so. The matter was considered by Brennan J in 1996 who held that the trial cannot be severed into parts, one part being determined by the High Court, the other part being determined by the Supreme Court. The Electoral Act was then amended to provide that the Federal Court could determine part of the issue. Various matters have been referred to the Federal Court, however on each occasion the petition has been dismissed. In 2009 a Full Court of the Federal Court confirmed that there is no appeal from a decision of the Federal Court sitting as the Court of Disputed Returns.

=== 2013 Senate Election for WA ===
The 2013 Senate election for Western Australia was close for the 5th and 6th Senate seats. The critical part of the count was which of 2 candidates should be excluded, referred to as the 50th exclusion point. The difference between the 2 candidates was 14 votes. After the original scrutiny and a fresh scrutiny the 5th seat went to Zhenya Wang and the 6th to Louise Pratt. Because the vote was so close the Electoral Commissioner had directed a re-count, during which it was discovered that 1,370 ballot papers had been misplaced. In the recount the 50th exclusion point went the other way with a margin of 12 votes, with the result that the 5th seat went to Wayne Dropulich and the 6th to Scott Ludlam. The Australian Electoral Commission petitioned the Court for a declaration that, because of the loss of the ballot papers, the election was void. The Court held that (1) the loss of the ballot papers meant that 1,370 electors had been prevented from voting, (2) the records of the earlier scrutinies could not be used by the court. The Court declared that Mr Dropulich and Senator Ludlam were not duly elected, but could not declare who was duly elected. The result was that election was declared void. A special election was held on 5 April 2014.

=== Re Culleton (2017) ===
Rod Culleton was declared elected as a Senator for WA following the 2016 federal election on 2 July, however questions were raised about his eligibility to sit as a senator. On 7 November 2016 the Senate referred that question to the Court of Disputed Returns and Culleton was subsequently found to be disqualified from sitting on 2 grounds of section 44 of the Constitution. The first was that on 23 December 2016 the Federal Court declared Culleton was bankrupt, Culleton sought to challenge the capacity of the President of the Senate to advise the Governor of Western Australia that as a result of Culleton's bankruptcy his seat in the Senate was vacant however this was dismissed by Gageler J. The second ground of disqualification was the decision of the Court of Disputed Returns that at the time of his election, Culleton, having been convicted, in his absence, of larceny, was "subject to be sentenced" for an offence punishable by imprisonment for one year or longer.

=== Re Day (2017) ===
Bob Day had been a senator since 1 July 2014. In 2016 his building company, Home Australia, went into liquidation. As Day had given personal guarantees to creditors, it was likely that he would be declared bankrupt and thus ineligible to keep his seat as a senator. Day resigned as a senator on 1 November 2016. There were questions concerning his eligibility to sit as a senator as a result of his interest in a property leased as his electorate office. On 8 November the Senate referred those questions to the Court of Disputed Returns. Questions of fact were determined at a trial before Gordon J. The Full Court held that the financial benefit that Day obtained from the lease was an "indirect pecuniary interest" in an agreement with the Commonwealth. He was therefore incapable of sitting as a senator since at least 26 February 2016.

=== Dual citizenship eligibility questions ===
In July 2017 Senator Scott Ludlam resigned as having dual Australian and New Zealand citizenship. Four days later Senator Larissa Waters also resigned as result of having dual citizenship. In the following weeks questions about other members of Parliament were raised. On 8 August the Senate referred the question of the eligibility of Ludlam, Waters and Canavan to the Court of Disputed Returns. On 9 August Roberts was also referred. On 4 September MP Barnaby Joyce and senators Nash and Xenophon were also referred. The cases were heard by the Full Court over three days from 10 October, and the judgment handed down on 27 October 2017. In a joint judgment the High Court followed the reasoning of the majority in Sykes v Cleary. Having decided that the fact of citizenship was disqualifying, regardless of whether the person knew of the citizenship or took any voluntary act, it followed that each of Joyce, Ludlam, Nash, Roberts and Waters had been ineligible to be elected. Under Italian law Canavan was not a citizen of Italy and was therefore eligible to be elected. Xenophon, as a British overseas citizen, did not have the right to enter or reside in the United Kingdom and so was neither a citizen nor entitled to the rights and privileges of a citizen of the United Kingdom.

== See also ==
- List of High Court of Australia cases
- List of Commonwealth courts and tribunals
