= Commonwealth Electoral Act 1918 =

Australian suffrage law

Parliament of Australia
- Long title: An Act to Consolidate and Amend the Law relating to Parliamentary Elections and for other purposes
- Assented to by: Governor-General Sir Ronald Munro Ferguson
- Assented to: 21 November 1918
- Commenced: Various dates

Amended by
- 1924, 1949, 1962, 1973, 1984, 2016, 2020

Related legislation
- Commonwealth Franchise Act 1902, Commonwealth Electoral Act 1902
- Status: Amended

The Commonwealth Electoral Act 1918 is an Act of the Australian Parliament which continues to be the core legislation governing the conduct of elections in Australia, having been amended on numerous occasions since 1918. The Act was introduced by the Nationalist Party of Billy Hughes, the main purpose of which was to replace first-past-the-post voting with instant-runoff voting ("preferential voting") for the House of Representatives and the Senate. The Labor Party opposed the introduction of preferential voting. The Act has been amended on several occasions since.

== Previous legislation ==
The 1918 Act replaced the Commonwealth Franchise Act 1902, which had defined who was entitled to vote in Australian federal elections, and the Commonwealth Electoral Act 1902. The 1902 Franchise Act set uniform national franchise criteria, establishing the voting age at 21 years and women's suffrage at the national level, also a right to stand for election to the Parliament. That Act also disqualified from voting a number of categories of people, including Indigenous peoples from Australia, Asia, Africa and the Pacific Islands (except New Zealand Māori), even if citizens of the British Empire. A plurality voting system ("first-past-the-post") was established. The legislation also made it clear that no person could vote more than once at each election. In 1908, a permanent electoral roll was established and in 1911 it became compulsory for eligible voters to enrol. Compulsory enrolment led to a large increase in voter turnout, even though voting was still voluntary. From 1912, elections have been held on Saturdays.

== Provisions ==
=== 1918 Act ===
The 1918 Act replaced the Commonwealth Franchise Act 1902 and the Commonwealth Electoral Act 1902. It replaced first-past-the-post voting with instant-runoff voting ("preferential voting") for the House of Representatives and the Senate. (Preferential voting had been pioneered by Queensland in 1892.) The voting system was changed by the anti-Labor Hughes after the 1918 Swan by-election, which saw the Labor candidate win with 34% of the vote due to a split in the anti-Labor vote between the Nationalist and Country Party candidates, with 29.6% and 31.4% respectively. The Labor Party opposed the introduction of preferential voting.

The Act also repeated the special jurisdiction of the High Court of Australia as the Court of Disputed Returns in federal election matters, initially established by Part XVI of the Commonwealth Electoral Act 1902.

=== 1921 amendment ===
In 1921, the Act was amended to disqualify anyone standing for federal parliament who "has resigned from the Parliament of a State and has the right, under the law of the State, if not elected to the Parliament of the Commonwealth, to be re-elected to the Parliament of the State without the holding of a poll". This amendment was made specifically to overrule an Act passed by the Queensland state government, which allowed state MPs to automatically return to parliament without a by-election if they ran unsuccessfully for federal parliament. The Queensland government reportedly passed the legislation primarily for the benefit of Frank Forde, a future prime minister.

=== 1924 amendment ===
The Commonwealth Electoral Act 1924 amended the earlier Act to require compulsory voting at federal elections. It was introduced as a private senator's bill by Herbert Payne of the Nationalist Party, only the third such bill to pass through federal parliament. The introduction of compulsory voting saw voter turnout increase from a record low of 59 percent at the 1922 election to 91 percent at the 1925 election.

=== 1925 amendment ===
The Commonwealth Electoral Act 1925 introduced several changes, the most significant of which was a partial relaxation of racial restrictions on enrolment; in response to Indian-Australian Mitta Bullosh's successful court challenge to the refusal of his enrolment, and diplomatic pressure exerted by London and New Delhi, the right to enrol to vote was extended to "natives of British India", and also British subjects who had been naturalised by the Commonwealth or by a State (including their colonial predecessors).

=== 1949 amendments ===
The Chifley government amended the Electoral Act in 1949, in time for the 1949 federal election, as follows:

- the number of senators was increased from 36 to 60 (10 from each State), an increase of 24, and the number of members of the House of Representatives from 74 to 121, an increase of 47.
- the single transferable vote under a proportional voting system for the Senate was introduced.
- All Indigenous Australians eligible to vote in their respective states were granted the vote, as well as those who had served in the military

Although in 1948 (effective in 1949) Australian nationality law had been altered to create an Australian citizenship, the nationality criterion for the franchise remained that of being a British subject.

=== 1962 amendments ===
In 1962, the Menzies government extended the franchise to all Indigenous Australians at federal elections, though enrolment was voluntary. The amendment also made it an offence to encourage Indigenous Australians to enrol to vote.

=== 1973 and 1974 amendments ===
Changes to the Electoral Act in 1973 by the Whitlam government included:

- the qualifying voting age was lowered from 21 to 18 years.
- the ACT and Northern Territory became entitled to representation in both Houses for the first time in 1974.
- the allowable quota variation of the number of electors in each division of a state was reduced from 20% to 10%.

=== 1984 amendments ===
Changes to the Electoral Act in 1984 by the Hawke government included:

- an independent Australian Electoral Commission (AEC) was established to administer the federal electoral system.
- the number of senators was increased from 64 to 76 (12 from each State and two from each Territory), an increase of 12, and the number of members of the House of Representatives was increased from 125 to 148, an increase of 23.
- the group voting ticket voting system (the original "above-the-line" voting) was introduced.
- the registration of political parties was introduced to permit the printing of party names on ballot papers.
- public funding of election campaigns and disclosure of political donations and electoral expenditure was introduced.
- the compulsory enrolment and voting requirement was extended to cover Indigenous Australians.
- the franchise qualification was changed to Australian citizenship, though British subjects on the roll immediately before 26 January 1984 retained enrolment and voting rights.
- the grace period after an election is called before the electoral rolls are closed was extended to seven days and the time that polling places closed was changed from 8pm to 6pm.
- Section 282 was added, requiring the AEC to conduct a recount following a dissolution under section 57 of the Constitution as if only the elected candidates had been named on the ballot papers, and only half the number were to be elected. The constitution requires the Senate to allocate long and short term senate seats, and this provides one way of determining which senators are allocated which terms. As of 2016, this method had not yet been applied, despite two bipartisan senate resolutions in favour of using it as well as two double dissolution elections (1987 and 2016). See also Stalled reform on allocation of terms
- existing legislation on the Senate (Representation of Territories) Act 1973 regarding federal parliamentary representation of Northern Territory, Australian Capital Territory and other territories were incorporated into the Commonwealth Electoral Act 1918. This included appointment of territory Senate casual vacancies.

=== 2013 amendments ===
The Electoral and Referendum Amendment (Improving Electoral Procedure) Act 2013 amended the Electoral Act to:

- increase the nomination deposit to $1000 and $2000 per candidate for the House of Representatives and the Senate respectively
- increase the required number of signatures to 100 in order to be nominated as an independent candidate
- require grouped independent Senate candidates to each be nominated by 100 unique electors

=== 2016 amendments ===
In 2016, the registered preference part of the Senate group ticket voting system was abolished, to avoid undue influence of preference deals experienced in 2013, and especially cascading preference deals (which are unlikely to be obvious to most voters).

=== 2020 amendment ===
On 9 December 2020, the Electoral Act was amended by the Electoral Amendment (Territory Representation) Act to use the harmonic mean method to calculate the entitlement determination for the territories. The amendment came into effect on 15 February 2021.

=== 2021 amendments ===
In September 2021, the Electoral Act was amended by the Electoral Legislation Amendment (Party Registration Integrity) Act 2021 and made the rules surrounding the registration of political parties stricter. The tightening of party registration rules was reportedly due to an increase of parties on the Senate ballot, which resulted in the requirement of magnifying sheets for some voters to read the ballot, and a perception that voters would be misled by names of some minor parties. The first change was the increase of membership requirements for a party from 500 to 1500. The second change was that parties cannot have names that were too similar to political parties registered before them. This meant that new parties are prevented from registering a party name and/or logo "too similar to an existing party's". As for existing registered parties, a party may also object to a similar name or logo used by another party, if the latter party was registered later than the former party. If the Australian Electoral Commission (AEC) is satisfied with the objection, it can uphold the objection, and the later-registered party will be deregistered within a month of the upholding, if an application to change the name or logo is not made or has been denied.

== See also ==
- Electoral system of Australia
- Sue v Hill
- Section 44 of the Australian Constitution
