= Joseph Vardon =

Australian politician

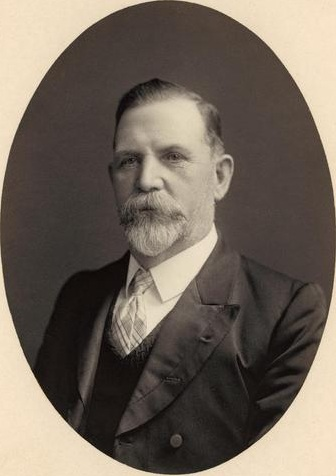

Senator for South Australia
- In office 1 January 1907 – 31 May 1907
- Succeeded by: James O'Loghlin
- In office 15 February 1908 – 30 June 1913
- Preceded by: James O'Loghlin

Personal details
- Born: 27 July 1843 Adelaide, South Australia
- Died: 20 July 1913 (aged 69)
- Party: Anti-Socialist (1907–09); Liberal (1909–13)
- Occupation: Businessman

Joseph Vardon (27 July 1843 – 20 July 1913) was an Australian politician. He served as a Senator for South Australia in 1907 and from 1908 to 1913. He was also a member of the South Australian Legislative Council from 1900 to 1906.

== Early life ==
Born in Adelaide, he received a primary education before becoming a farm worker and apprentice printer, running his own printing business by 1871. He sat on Hindmarsh, Unley, and Adelaide City councils, and was President of the South Australian Liberal Union.

== Politics ==
Vardon was elected to the Legislative Council of South Australia for the Central District in May 1900, serving until October 1906. Vardon resigned to contest the federal election in December 1906 as an Anti-Socialist candidate for the three South Australian seats in the Australian Senate. At the first count he was in fourth place, 16 votes behind Dugald Crosby. A second count however put Vardon into third, 34 votes ahead of Crosby. Justice Barton, sitting as the Court of Disputed Returns, found that 185 votes had been invalidated because of errors by the returning officers which affected the outcome of the election and declared the election void on 31 May 1907. The South Australian Labor Government attempted to install James O'Loghlin in the vacancy. Vardon's initial attempts to obtain a fresh election were unsuccessful. Vardon subsequently succeeded with the High Court declaring O'Loghlin's appointment was void and ordering a supplementary election. Vardon and O'Loghlin both contested the election, with Vardon winning comfortably with 54% of the vote. He was defeated in the 1913 Election, by now a member of the Commonwealth Liberal Party.

== Personal life ==
His son, Edward Vardon, was an MP for Sturt 1918–1921, 1924–1930 and South Australian Nationalist Senator 1921–1923.

His daughter, Hilda Marian Vardon (1886–1959) married Horace Abercrombie Fairweather (1881–1969), brother of Andrew Fairweather, on 12 April 1911.
