= Section 44 of the Constitution of Australia =

Australian constitution section on elections

Section 44 of the Australian Constitution lists the grounds for disqualification on who may become a candidate for election to the Parliament of Australia. It has generally arisen for consideration by the High Court sitting in its capacity as the Court of Disputed Returns.

It has been reviewed several times, but has not been amended. Following several disqualifications under sub-section 44(i), in particular the 2017–18 Australian parliamentary eligibility crisis, in which several high-profile politicians were forced to resign, a new review of the whole section was instituted on 28 November 2017.

== The Constitution ==
Section 44 of the Constitution states:

44. Any person who –

(i.) Is under any acknowledgement of allegiance, obedience, or adherence to a foreign power, or is a subject or a citizen or entitled to the rights or privileges of a subject or citizen of a foreign power: or
(ii.) Is attainted of treason, or has been convicted and is under sentence, or subject to be sentenced, for any offence punishable under the law of the Commonwealth or of a State by imprisonment for one year or longer: or
(iii.) Is an undischarged bankrupt or insolvent: or
(iv.) Holds any office of profit under the Crown, or any pension payable during the pleasure of the Crown out of any of the revenues of the Commonwealth: or
(v.) Has any direct or indirect pecuniary interest in any agreement with the Public Service of the Commonwealth otherwise than as a member and in common with the other members of an incorporated company consisting of more than twenty-five persons:

shall be incapable of being chosen or of sitting as a senator or a member of the House of Representatives.

But sub-section iv. does not apply to the office of any of the Queen's Ministers of State for the Commonwealth, or of any of the Queen's Ministers for a State, or to the receipt of pay, half pay, or a pension, by any person as an officer or member of the Queen's navy or army, or to the receipt of pay as an officer or member of the naval or military forces of the Commonwealth by any person whose services are not wholly employed by the Commonwealth.

The Australian Electoral Commission reproduces the section in its Candidates Handbook, where it draws particular attention to s 44(i) and (iv). As to the nomination form, it advises that to give "false or misleading information", or to "omit any information if omitting that information would be misleading", is a criminal offence and that the "maximum penalty for this offence is imprisonment for 12 months". It does not spell out that such a conviction could result in disqualification under s 44(ii).

Almost every part of section 44 has proved difficult to interpret and apply. Its replacement or revision has been frequently considered, particularly by a Constitutional Commission in 1988 and by a parliamentary committee in 1997, but their proposals have not been pursued. There has been regret that the framers of the Constitution did not accept the suggestions that criteria of disqualification be left entirely to the Parliament or that, at least, like s 34 "Qualifications of members" this section should begin "Until the Parliament otherwise provides".

Following several disqualifications under sub-section 44(i) during 2017, on 28 November 2017 Prime Minister Malcolm Turnbull asked the Commonwealth Parliament's Joint Standing Committee on Electoral Matters to conduct a new inquiry into the section, including the possibility of amendment. Public hearings began on 8 December and submissions closed on 9 February 2018; the Committee was to report on s 44(i) by 23 March 2018 and on the other sub-sections, particularly 44(iv) and 44(v), by 30 June.

== (i) Allegiance to a foreign power ==
Subsection 44(i) has generally been interpreted by the High Court of Australia as meaning that persons with dual citizenship are not permitted to stand for election and that a person must take "reasonable steps" to renounce their citizenship of the other country. Its interpretation has been difficult. There is the preliminary awkwardness that the Constitution itself does not require a member of the Parliament to be an Australian Citizen (or, before the introduction of Australian citizenship in 1949, a "British subject" or "subject of the Queen"), (Note: In contrast, the Constitution of the United States, which was the principal model for the Australian Constitution, restricts election to Congress to persons who have been US citizens for seven years (House) or nine years (Senate).) although Constitution s 42 does require members to swear an oath or affirmation of allegiance to the monarch; however, Australian citizenship has been made a statutory condition of eligibility for election.

In 1981, a committee of the Senate recommended that s 44(i) be removed, although with the insertion of a new provision requiring Australian citizenship; as did the Constitutional Commission report of 1988. In 1990, The Canberra Times reported that at least nine MPs elected at the 1987 federal election had renounced foreign citizenships, as a result of threatened High Court action by Sydney barrister and independent Senate candidate George Turner. In 1997, a committee of the House of Representatives, whose report predicted some of the difficulties that have since arisen, recommended three changes to the Constitution: "delete subsection 44(i); insert a new provision requiring candidates and members of parliament to be Australian citizens; [and] empower parliament to enact legislation determining the grounds of disqualification of members of parliament in relation to foreign allegiance".

Compared to other Anglosphere nations, this is an unusual provision. Neither the British Parliament nor the US Congress, both of which served as models for the Australian Parliament, forbids dual citizens from holding office. Canada and New Zealand similarly have no prohibitions on MPs holding dual citizenship.

An opinion poll taken in late November to early December 2017 found overall opposition to changing s 44(i) of 49% to 47% (within the margin of error), with 5% undecided. An earlier poll by Essential asked whether they thought dual citizens should be allowed to be members of parliament, 41% said yes and 40% said no, with 18% saying they did not know.

In May 2018, a Newspoll found 51% backed section 44 of the constitution banning dual-citizenship holders, against 38% who did not.

The third arm of s 44(i), "or entitled to the rights or privileges of a subject or a citizen of a foreign power", has never been the subject of a judicial decision. However, it was suggested in July 2019 that this could catch at least 26 current members of the parliament, from almost all parties as well as independent. They include some who renounced actual foreign citizenship prior to or during the crisis of 2017–18. The argument is that some countries provide rights to non-citizens that include important rights ordinarily possessed by citizens—particularly a "right of abode" allowing entry, residence and employment, as well as eligibility to vote and even to sit in the country's parliament. The most relevant example is that, in the UK, a citizen of a country in the Commonwealth of Nations counts as a "Commonwealth citizen" (not to be confused with citizenship of the Commonwealth of Australia).

=== Sarina v O'Connor (1946) and Crittenden v Anderson (1950) ===
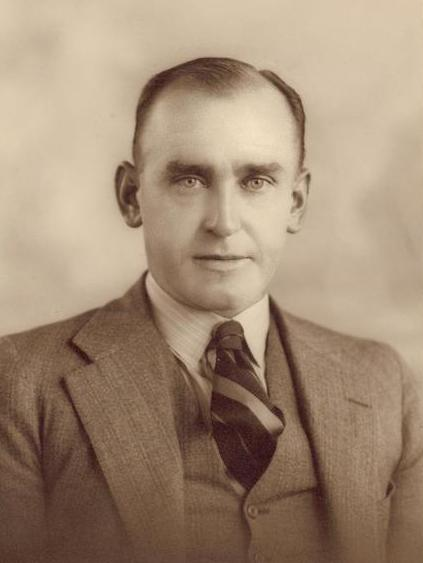
William O'Connor

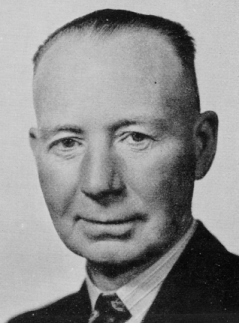
Gordon Anderson

Following the 1946 federal election, an unsuccessful candidate for West Sydney, Ronald Grafton Sarina, petitioned the High Court to declare the election of William O'Connor void under s 44(i), claiming that as a Roman Catholic, O'Connor was under an allegiance to a foreign power. In December that year, Sarina's solicitor sought leave to withdraw the petition, which was granted.

A similar case arose in 1950, with independent candidate Henry William Crittenden petitioning for Gordon Anderson (Kingsford Smith) to be disqualified on the basis of his Catholicism. Justice Fullagar ruled against Crittenden, saying that were his premise to be sustained, it would prevent any Catholic from holding a seat in the Australian parliament. The decisive factor was that to exclude Catholics from the parliament would be to impose a "religious test" for public office, contrary to Constitution s 116. Fullagar J also said that the petition invited analysis of the relations between church and state over centuries, the relationship between Italy and the Papal States, and the sovereignty of the Vatican City State—none of which, in his opinion, was relevant to the election of an Australian member of parliament. The case was dismissed, with Crittenden ordered to pay Anderson's costs.

=== Nile v Wood and Re Wood (1987) ===
Robert Wood was elected as a Senator for NSW in 1987. The Call to Australia party's Elaine Nile challenged his election on grounds that included that "His actions against the vessels of a friendly nation indicate allegiance, obedience or adherence to a foreign power". This related to Wood being fined $120 for paddling a kayak in front of the US warship USS Joseph Strauss in Sydney Harbour. The High Court, Brennan, Deane and Toohey JJ, dismissed the petition in December 1987 on technical grounds. The brief judgment made a number of observations about subsection 44(i), relevantly including that it required an identified foreign power and an acknowledgement of allegiance.

It was later discovered that Wood had not been an Australian citizen at the time of his election. The High Court unanimously determined that, as he had not been an Australian citizen, he had not been eligible to be nominated for election as a senator and therefore had not been validly elected. The decision was based on the requirement in the Commonwealth Electoral Act 1918 that a candidate must be an Australian citizen. The High Court expressly declined to rule on the question of whether being a citizen of the United Kingdom would also disqualify a candidate from election.

=== Sykes v Cleary (1992) ===
The High Court held in Sykes v Cleary that the 1992 by-election for the Victorian seat of Wills was void because Phil Cleary, who had been declared elected, had held an "office of profit under the Crown", which violated s 44(iv). It was held that the centuries-old phrase "office of profit under the Crown" not only includes public servants as ordinarily understood but extends to "at least those persons who are permanently employed by government", whether government of the Commonwealth or of a State. Thus it included Cleary as a permanent teacher in a Victorian public school.

It was also determined (with one dissent) that a candidate must be qualified at the time of nomination. It was not sufficient that Cleary had been on unpaid leave and that he had resigned from his position on hearing that he would be declared elected.

It was therefore unnecessary for the High Court to decide the challenge under s 44(i) to the eligibility of other candidates, but it did so since they evidently might have wished to stand in the next election. Bill Kardamitsis had been born in Greece as a Greek citizen and John Delacretaz in Switzerland as a Swiss citizen; they had migrated to Australia and become Australian citizens. By a majority of 5:2 the Court held that a dual citizen is disqualified by s 44(i) unless they have "taken reasonable steps" to renounce their foreign citizenship. Renunciation procedures were available to Kardamitsis and Delacretaz in Greece and Switzerland, but neither of them had taken any such step.

Deane and Gaudron JJ dissented, holding that Kardamatsis and Delacretaz had effectively renounced their foreign citizenships when taking an Australian oath of allegiance, which at the times when they were naturalised had included, or required previously making, a renunciation of all foreign allegiances. (Note: They were naturalised before 1986, when the renunciation requirement was removed.) Additionally, Deane J thought that s 44(i) requires a "mental element" not only as to "acknowledgment" but also as to being "a subject or a citizen" of a foreign power: "it applies only to cases where the relevant status, rights or privileges have been sought, accepted, asserted or acquiesced in by the person concerned".

A "mental element" had been explicit in early Convention drafts, which had disqualified any person "Who has taken an oath or made a declaration or acknowledgment of allegiance, obedience, or adherence to a foreign power, or has done any act whereby he has become a subject or citizen, or entitled to the rights or privileges of a subject or a citizen, of a foreign power" (Sydney Convention 1891 and, with capitalisation and punctuation changes, Adelaide Convention 1897); the provision took its present form at the Melbourne Convention 1898.

=== Free v Kelly (1996) ===
At the 1996 federal election, the election of Jackie Kelly for the House of Representatives seat of Lindsay was challenged because she was a dual citizen of Australia and New Zealand at the time of her nomination. That part of the challenge was not pursued however as Kelly conceded that she was incapable of being chosen as a member of the House of Representatives while serving as an officer of the Royal Australian Air Force.

=== Sue v Hill (1999) ===
At the 1998 federal election, Heather Hill, who held both British and Australian citizenship, was elected to the Australian Senate as a One Nation senator for Queensland. Henry Sue, a voter from Queensland, appealed to the High Court of Australia.

Chief Justice Murray Gleeson ruled that the United Kingdom qualified as a "foreign power" under section 44(i), and as a British citizen Hill was therefore unable to take up her Senate seat. As a result, Len Harris, the second One Nation candidate on the ballot, was elected in place of Hill in the Senate.

=== 2017–18 Australian parliamentary eligibility crisis ===
==== Re Canavan (2017) ====
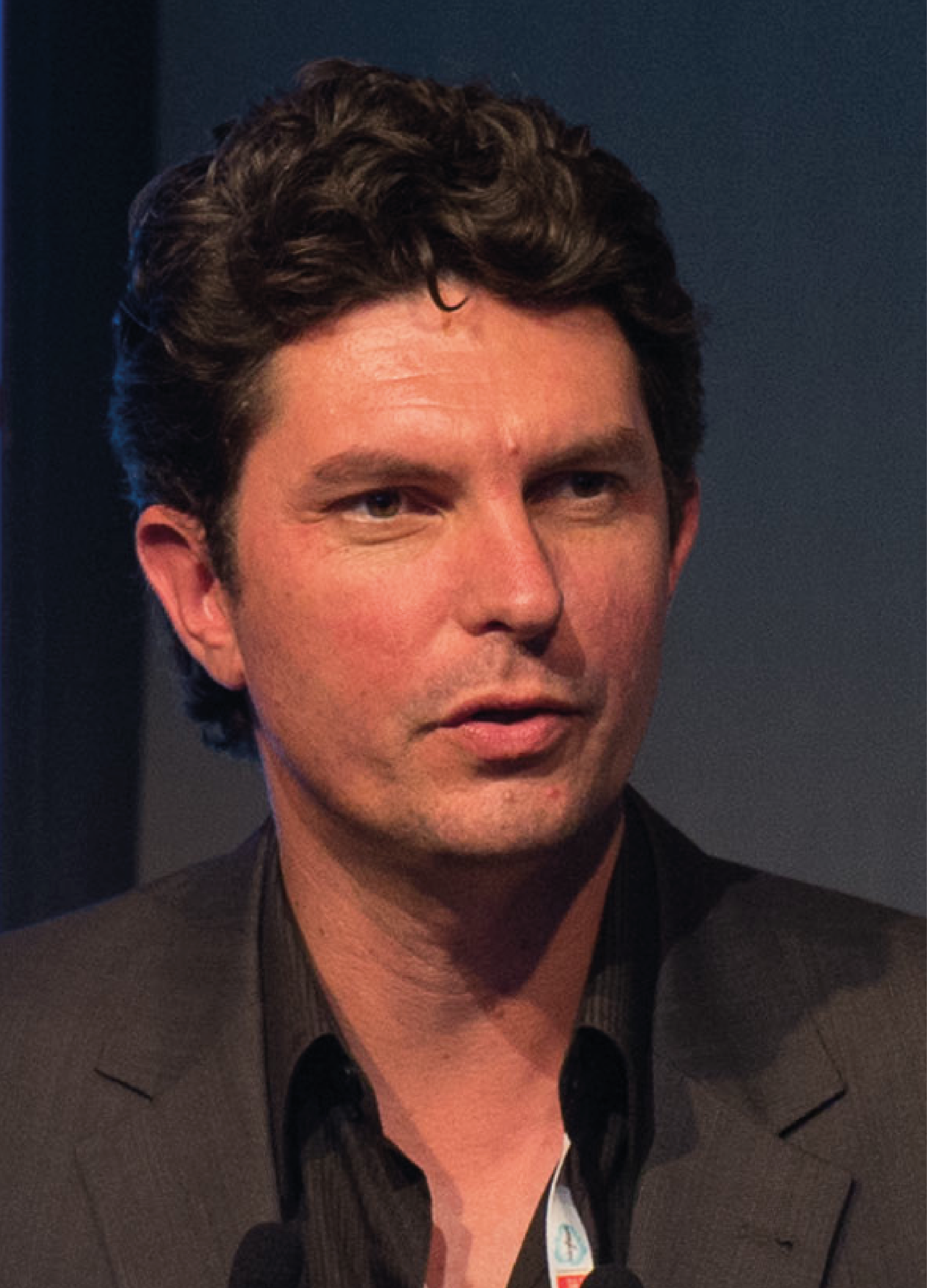
Scott Ludlam

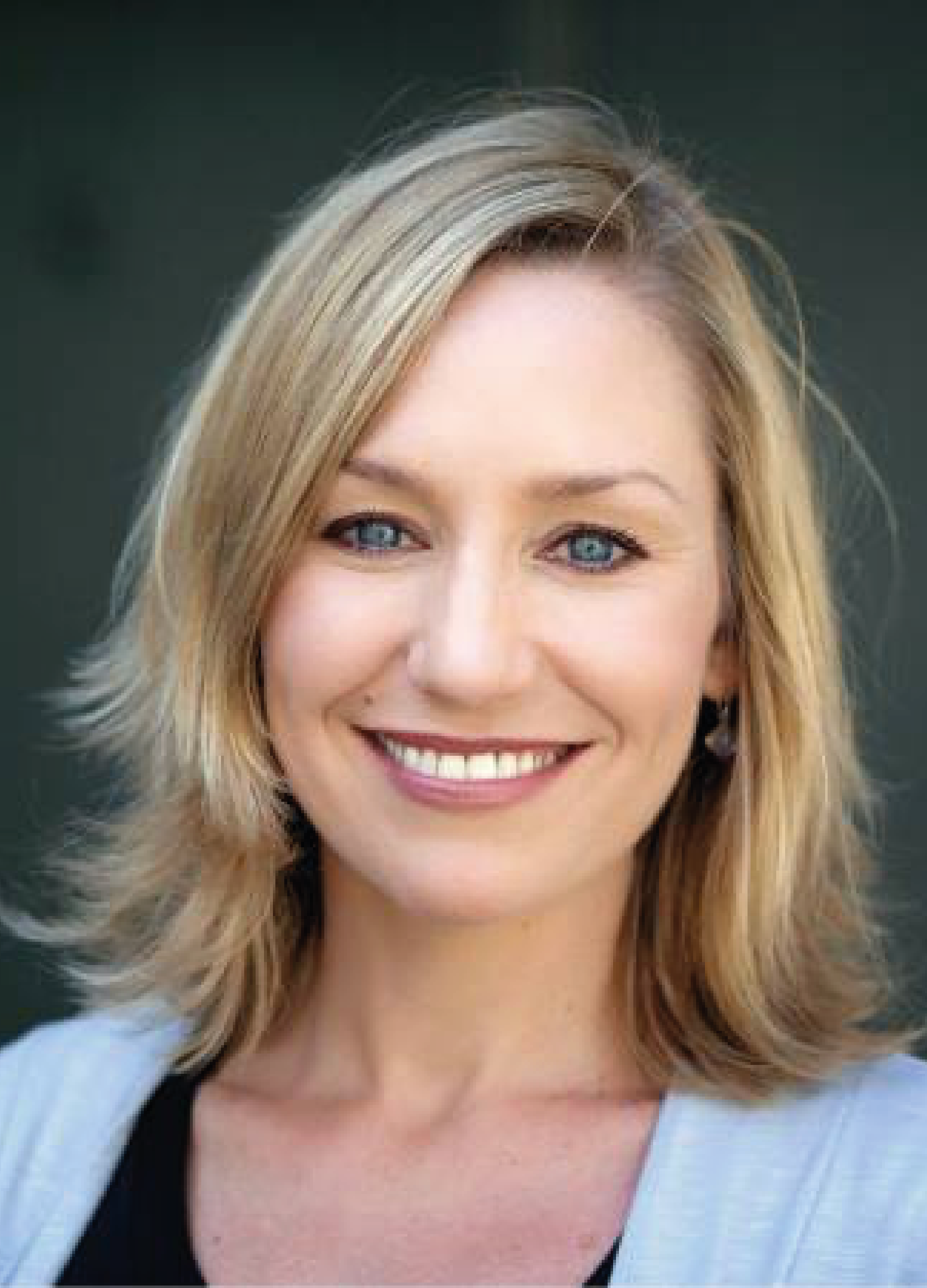
Larissa Waters

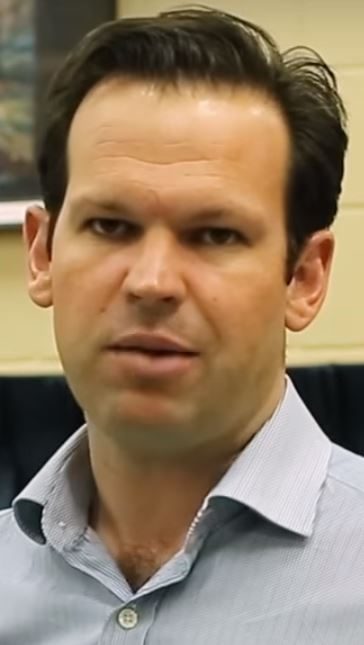
Matt Canavan

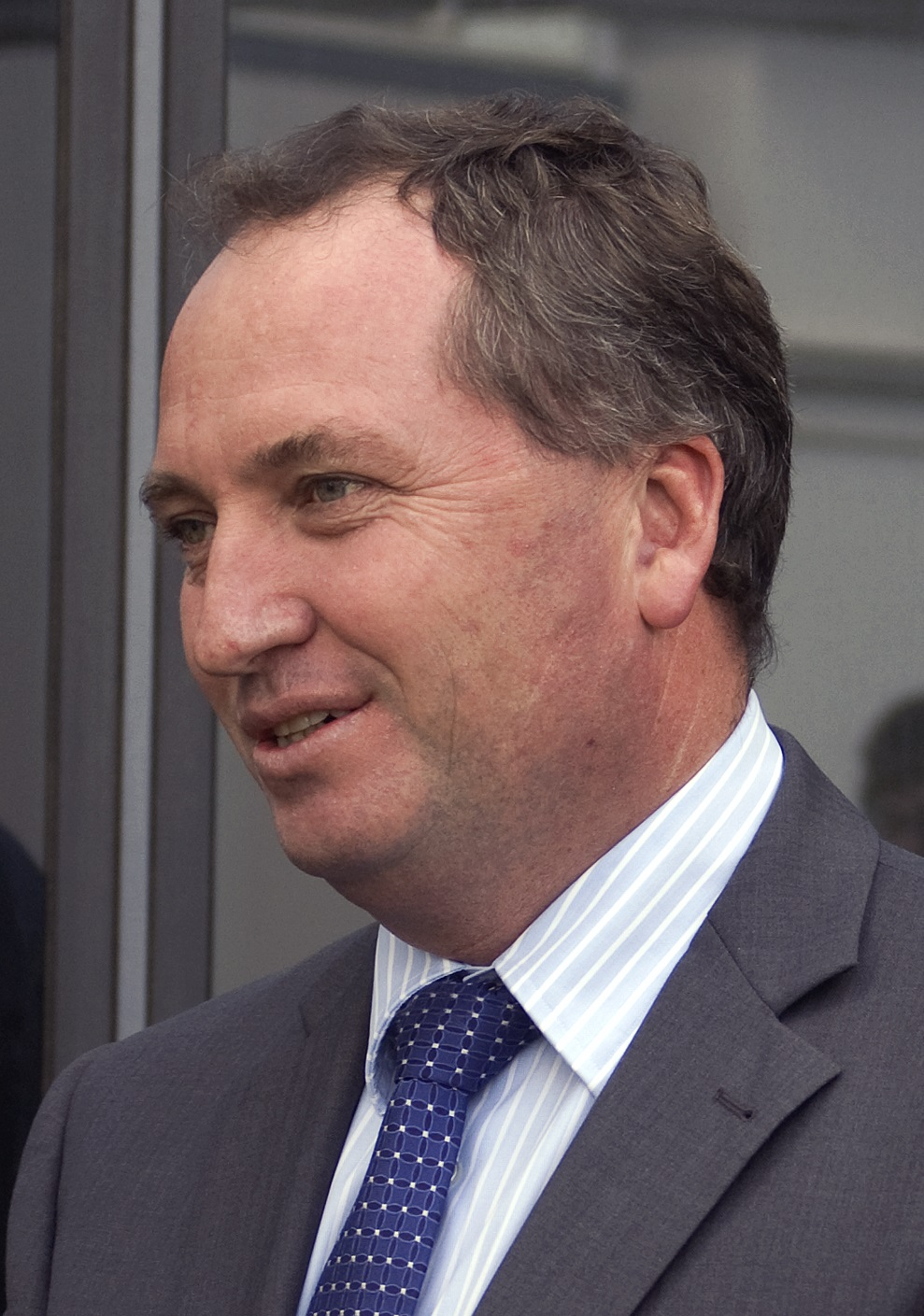
Barnaby Joyce

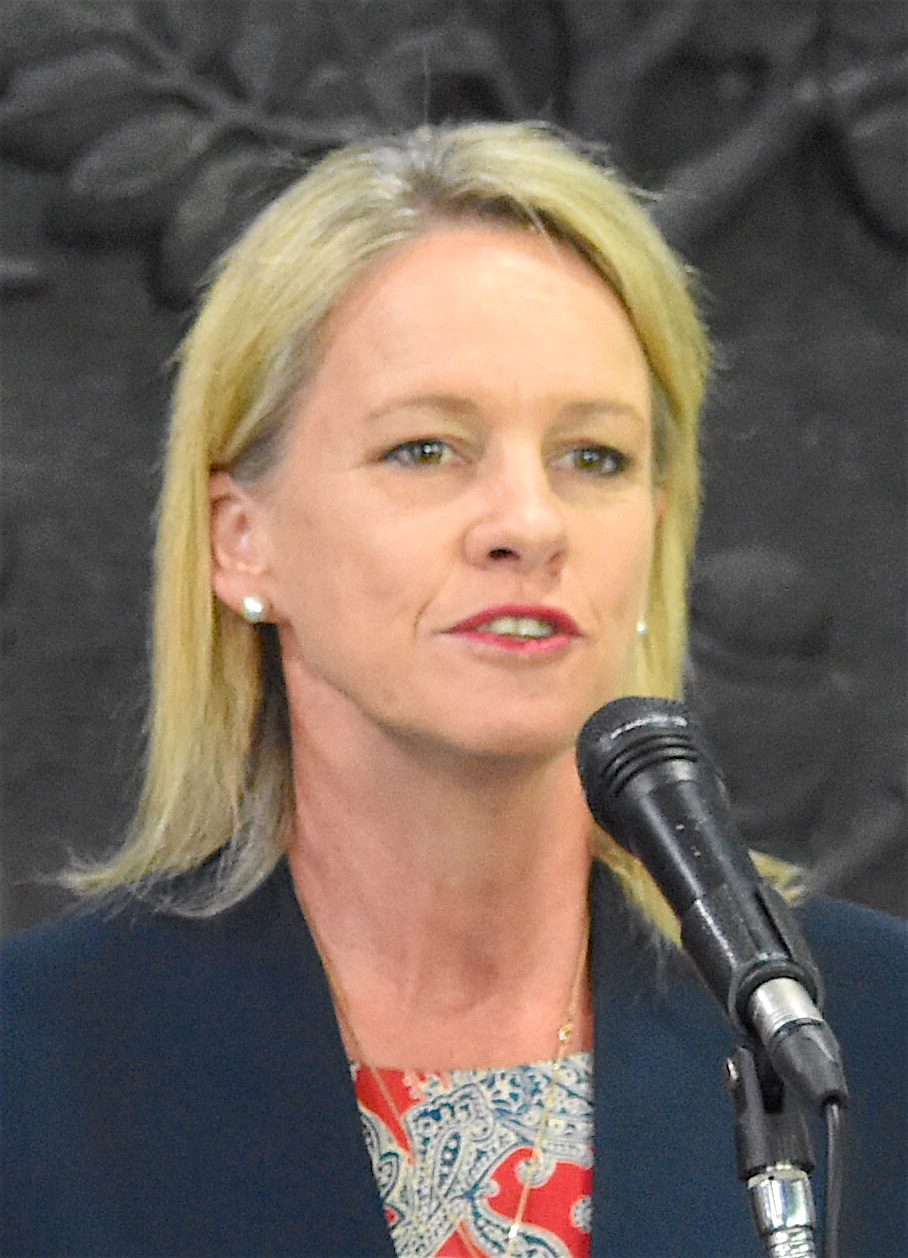
Fiona Nash

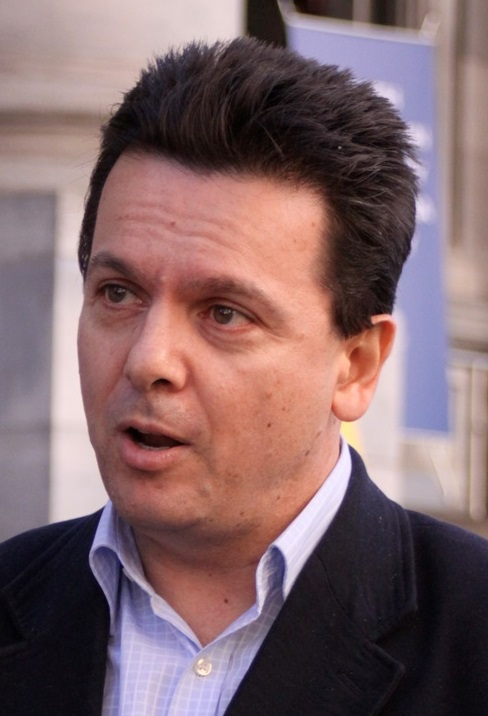
Nick Xenophon

During 2017 there arose seven instances of a possible breach of s 44(i), when over the course of several months seven parliamentarians were revealed to have held dual citizenship. The first two of the politicians whose dual citizenship status was revealed, Australian Greens Senators Scott Ludlam and Larissa Waters, resigned from Parliament shortly afterwards. Together with four other Senators and one member of the House of Representatives—Liberal National Party Senator Matt Canavan, One Nation Senator Malcolm Roberts, Deputy Prime Minister and Nationals leader Barnaby Joyce MP, Deputy leader of the Nationals and Senator Fiona Nash, and Nick Xenophon Team leader and Senator Nick Xenophon—their cases were referred to the High Court, through the Court of Disputed Returns. Hearings into the eligibility of the "Citizenship Seven" to sit in Parliament were held by the High Court in October 2017.

On 27 October 2017 the High Court handed down its decision. In a unanimous judgment, dealing with all seven cases, the Court interpreted s 44(i) according to the "ordinary and natural meaning" of its language. On that approach, it firstly affirmed the view taken in Sykes v Cleary that the question of eligibility is to be determined with reference to the point of nomination. The Court then followed the reasoning of the majority in Sykes v Cleary. It decided that the fact of citizenship was disqualifying, regardless of whether the person knew of the citizenship or engaged in any voluntary act of acquisition. It emphasised that to hold otherwise would introduce an element of subjectivity that "would be inimical to the stability of representative government". It followed that each of Joyce, Ludlam, Nash, Roberts and Waters "was therefore incapable of being chosen or of sitting as a senator or a member of the House of Representatives (as applicable)"; however, Canavan and Xenophon had been eligible due to not holding foreign citizenship. It was determined that Canavan, under Italian law, was not a citizen of Italy. It was found that Xenophon was a British Overseas citizen, but that this did not give him the right to enter or reside in the United Kingdom; therefore, in terms of s 44(i), he was neither a citizen nor entitled to the rights and privileges of a citizen of the United Kingdom. The Court declared the seats of the ineligible members to be vacant; the vacancy in the House of Representatives was to be filled through a by-election, while the vacancies in the Senate was to be filled by a recount, subject to supervision by a Justice of the Court.

Before they were ruled ineligible, the Labor Opposition had proposed that the challenged ministers who have not stepped aside from their position must do so due to Section 64 of the Constitution of Australia, which requires that nobody can serve as a minister for more than three months unless they are a member of the parliament; ministerial decisions taken by somebody who was not validly occupying ministerial office would themselves be invalid. While Matthew Canavan had already resigned from his positions of Minister for Resources and Northern Australia in the Cabinet prior to Labor's proposition, the other two Cabinet ministers, Barnaby Joyce and Fiona Nash, chose to remain in their positions until the court handed down its decision. According to some legal opinion, more than 100 Turnbull government decisions are vulnerable to legal challenge as a result of Joyce and Nash's ineligibility, with lawyers concluding there is a high likelihood the work the pair has done over the last year will end up before the courts.

==== Post-Re Canavan resignations and referrals ====
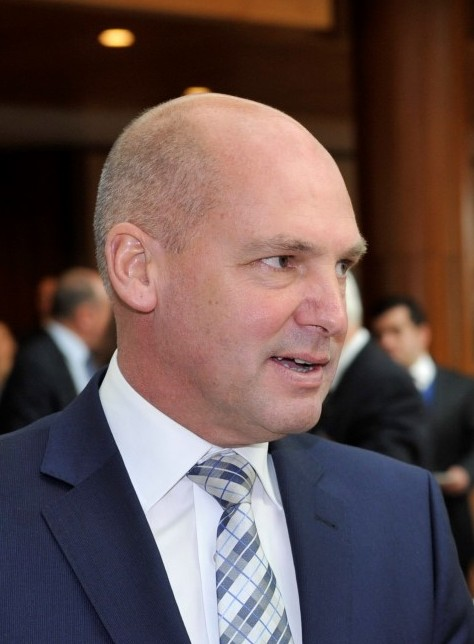
Stephen Parry

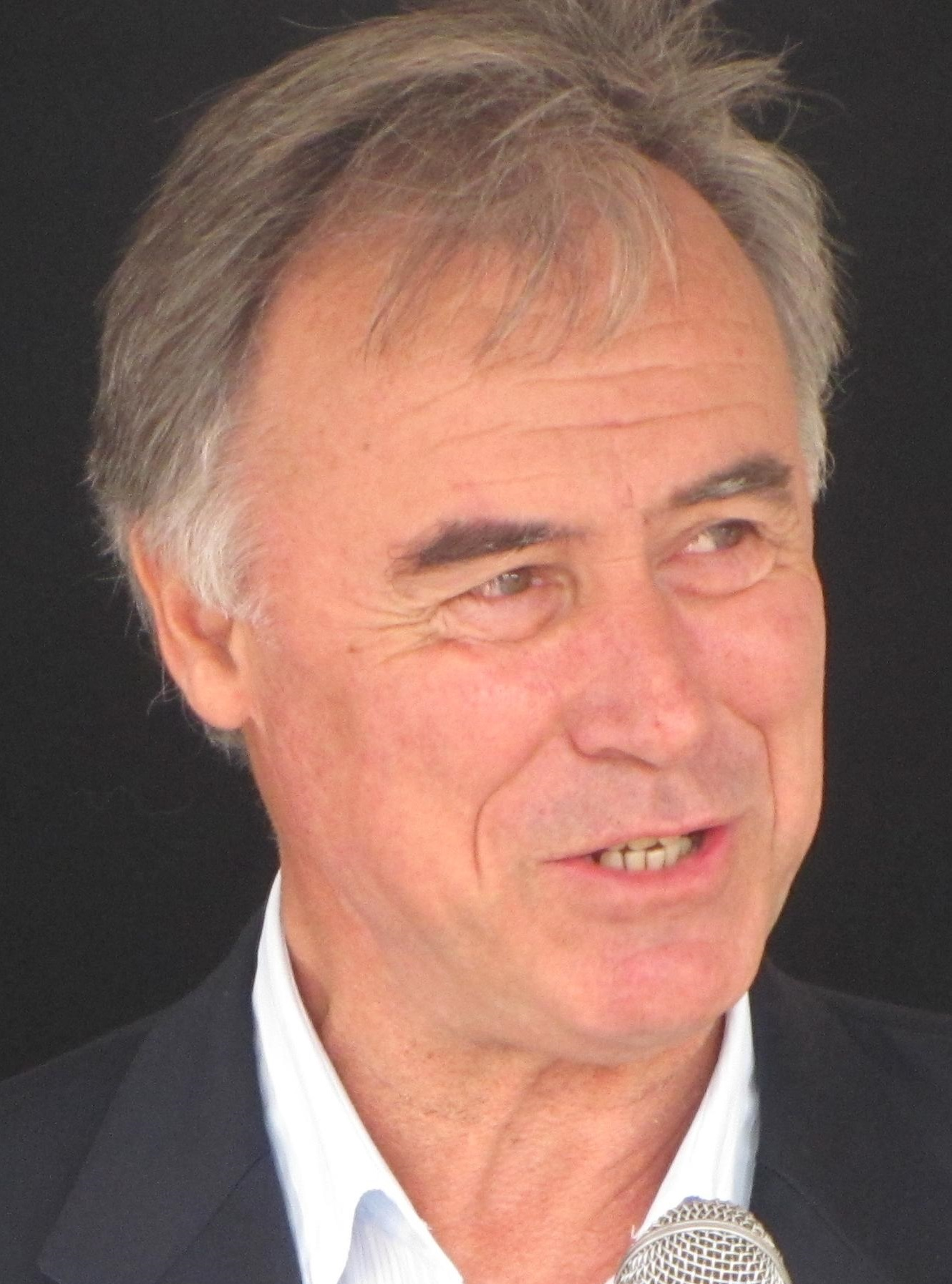
John Alexander

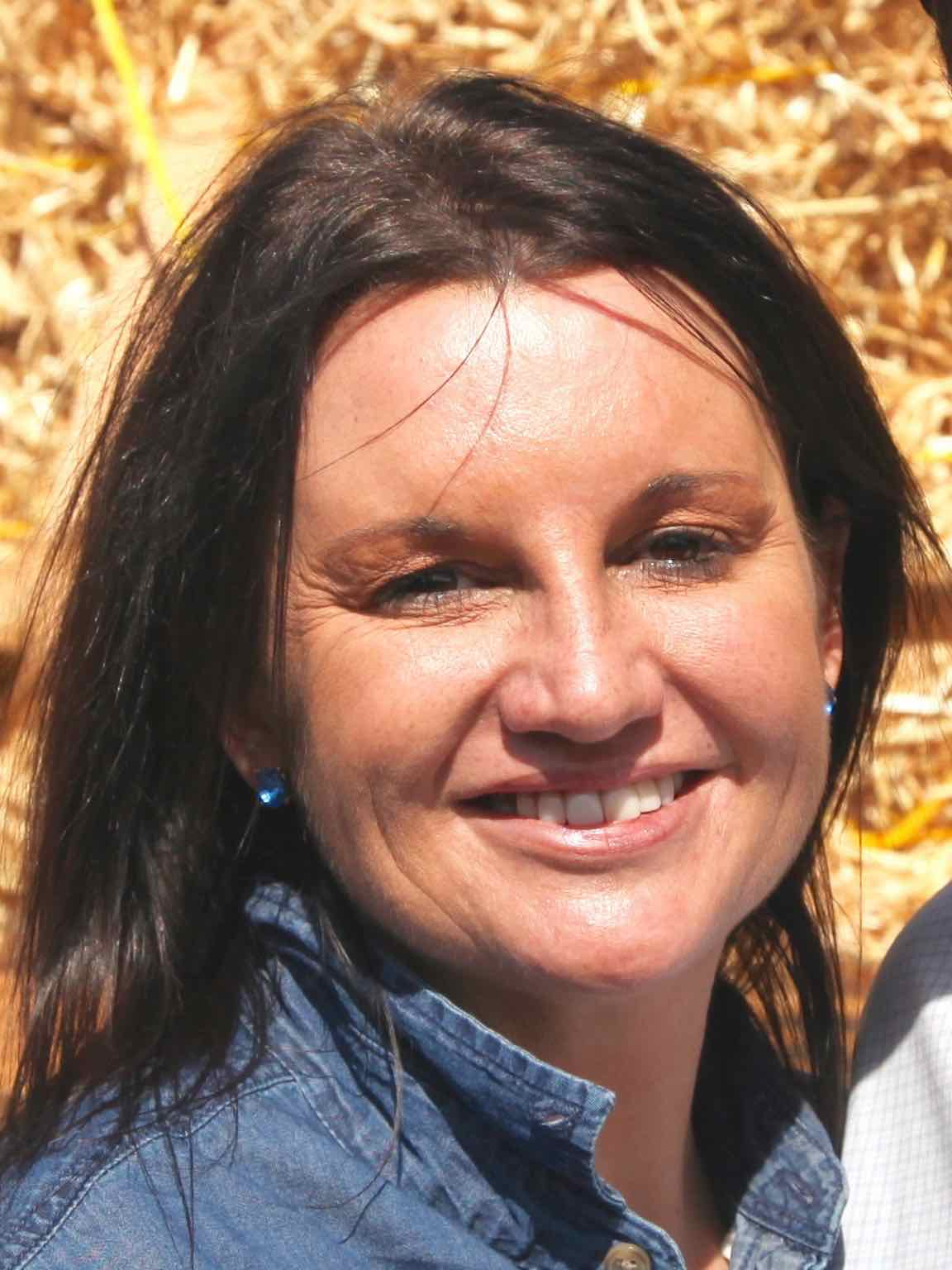
Jacqui Lambie

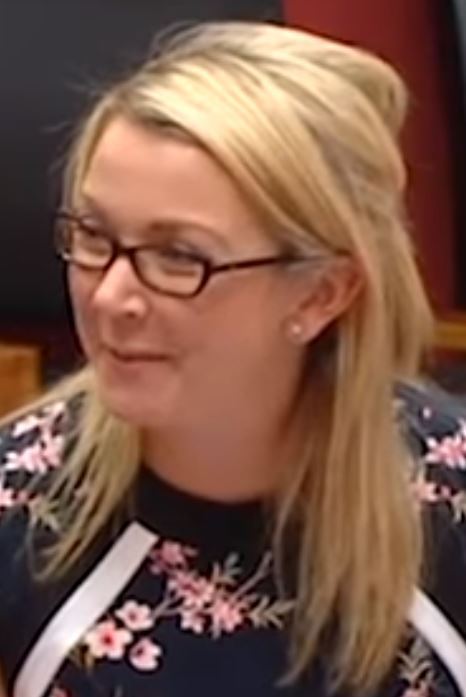
Skye Kakoschke-Moore

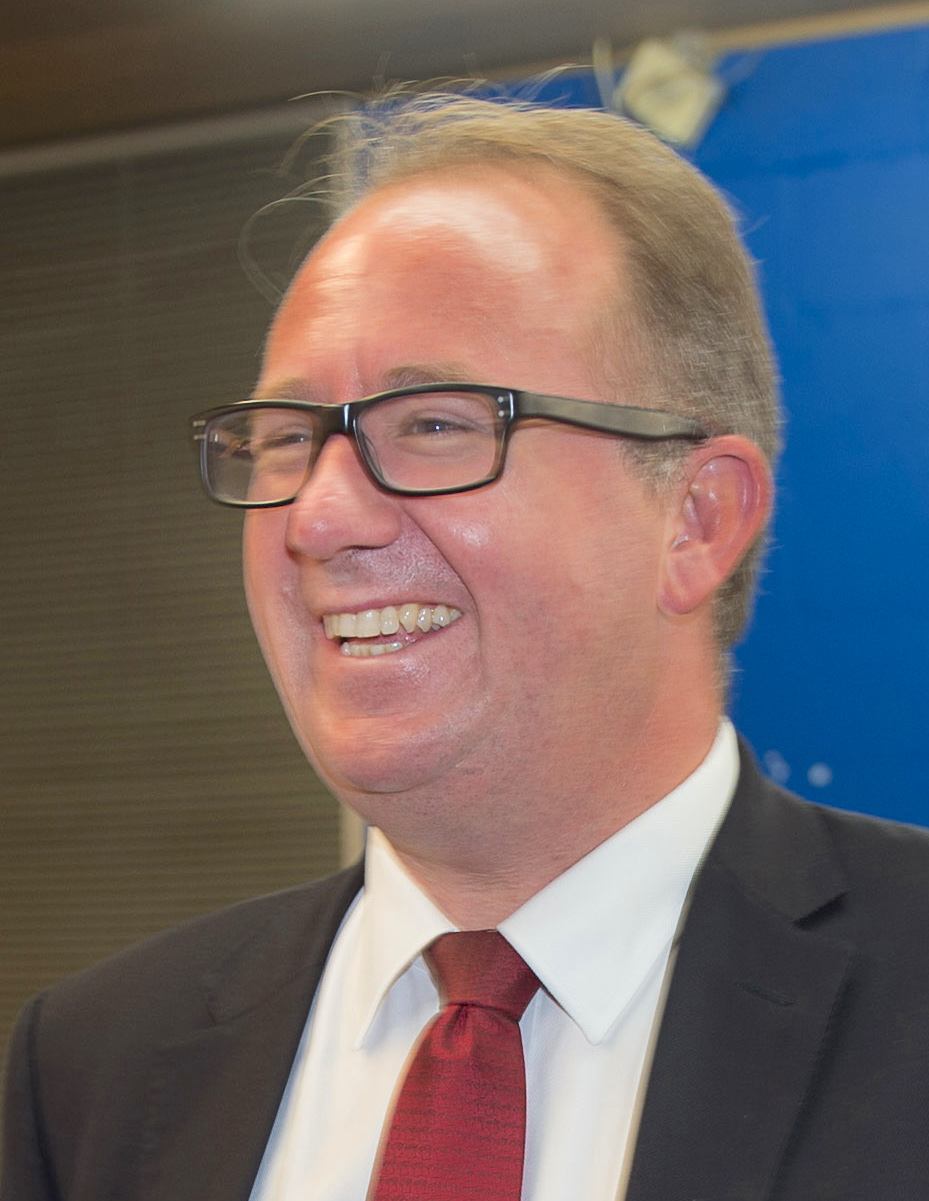
David Feeney

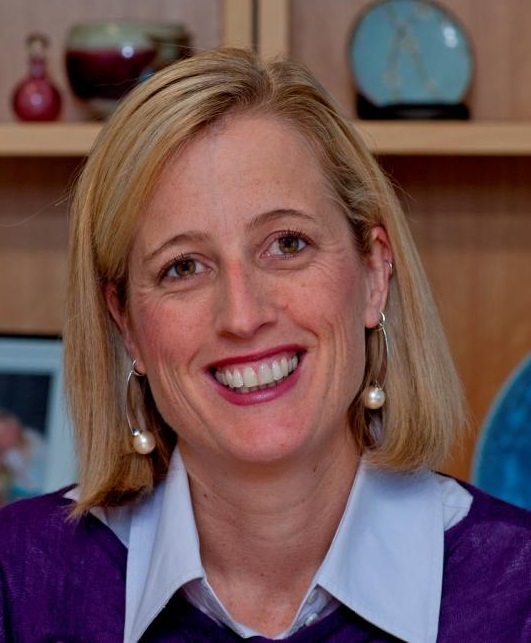
Katy Gallagher

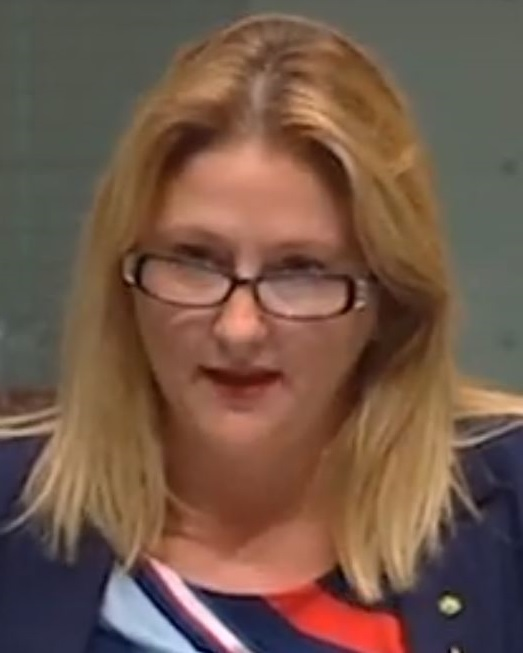
Rebekha Sharkie

After the decision in Re Canavan was handed down, several other parliamentarians discovered that they held dual citizenship and resigned. Liberal Senator and President of the Senate Stephen Parry, Liberal MP John Alexander, Jacqui Lambie Network Senator Jacqui Lambie, and NXT Senator Skye Kakoschke-Moore each resigned after individually discovering that they held British citizenship by descent. The Senate referred all three Senate cases to the High Court as the Court of Disputed Returns. A by-election in Alexander's seat was held on 16 December; Alexander was a candidate, having renounced his foreign citizenship, and retained the seat.

On 6 December the House of Representatives referred Labor MP David Feeney to the High Court as the Court of Disputed Returns and the Senate referred Labor Senator Katy Gallagher.

Feeney stated in the citizenship register that his father was born in Northern Ireland, and that he was advised by the party to ensure he renounced British (and potentially Irish) citizenship before nominating. Feeney said he did so in late 2007, but was unable to produce documentation confirming the renunciation had been registered. His legal representative submitted that Feeney's renunciation was lodged, but was not registered by British authorities "[f]or some reason". On 1 February 2018, before any further court proceedings, Feeney announced his resignation from the House of Representatives, and confirmed that he had been unable to find documentation proving his renunciation of British citizenship. On 23 February 2018, the Court held that Fenney had been ineligible to be elected by virtue of s.44(i) and that the vacancy is to be filled by a by-election. Feeney did not re-contest the seat in the by-election.

Gallagher filed UK citizenship renunciation papers with the UK Home Office on 20 April 2016, in the lead-up to the federal election in 2016, which took place on 2 July. The UK Home Office accepted her payment as part of the application on 6 May; however, on 1 July, it requested original copies of her birth certificate and her parents' marriage certificate as part of her renunciation, which Gallagher provided on 20 July. The renunciation of her British citizenship was effective on 16 August 2016, after the federal election. On 6 December 2017, at Gallagher's request the Senate referred her case to the High Court. On 9 May 2018, the Court unanimously found Gallagher to have been ineligible, with her seat to be filled by a countback.

Gallagher's disqualification triggered the resignations of Rebekha Sharkie, Josh Wilson, Susan Lamb and Justine Keay—four other MPs who had also attempted to renounce their British citizenships before the election, but were still effectively British citizens at the date of nominations. By-elections were held for their seats of Braddon, Fremantle, Longman and Mayo on 28 July 2018, with all four being re-elected.

=== Josh Frydenberg (2019) ===
In July 2019, Michael Staindl lodged in the Court of Disputed Returns a petition alleging that his electorate's MP, Josh Frydenberg—the federal treasurer and deputy leader of the Liberal Party—was ineligible under s 44(i) because due to being a citizen of Hungary. On 12 December 2019, since factual as well as legal questions remained unresolved, Justice Gordon of the High Court referred the case to the Federal Court. On 17 March 2020, a Full Court of the Federal Court found on the basis of expert evidence that Frydenberg's maternal family had lost their Hungarian citizenship upon leaving Hungary, so that he was not and had never been a Hungarian citizen, and consequently he was eligible to be elected to the federal parliament.

=== Change of law by foreign power (2026) ===
In February 2026, it emerged that two members of the Parliament—Tim Ayres (a Labor senator and minister) and Llew O'Brien (a Liberal National member of the House)—had discovered that a change of Canadian law effective in December 2025 had made them Canadian citizens, or eligible for Canadian citizenship, through a grandparent. According to the plain words of section 44, although they had been validly elected, they immediately became 'incapable ... of sitting' and their seats became vacant. Both of them have immediately taken steps to renounce Canadian citizenship (but that would not alter their current constitutional position).

== (ii) Criminal convictions ==
=== Nile v Wood (1987) ===
Another part of Nile's challenge to Robert Wood's election was that Wood had served a term of imprisonment in 1972 and had been convicted of obstructing shipping. These related to the $120 fine for paddling a kayak in front of the USS Joseph Strauss and being imprisoned for one month in 1972 for refusing to be conscripted to fight in the Vietnam War. The observations of the High Court about section 44 of the Constitution included that the disqualification is not simply for the conviction of an offence: the offence must be punishable by imprisonment for one year or more, and the person must have been, at the time of the election, carrying out a sentence, or subject to being sentenced, for that offence.

=== Re Culleton (No 2) (2017) ===
Rod Culleton was declared elected as a Senator for WA following the 2016 federal election on 2 July. In March 2016, before the election, Culleton had been convicted, in his absence, of larceny. He had the conviction annulled on 8 August, after the election. He then pleaded guilty but no conviction was recorded. In the High Court it was argued for Culleton that the annulment retrospectively voided the conviction and that, because he had been convicted in his absence, he had not been liable to any term of imprisonment.

The High Court rejected each of these arguments, holding as to the latter that in section 44(ii) the reference to a possible sentence relates to the seriousness of the offence and not to the liability of a particular convict. It said:

Senator Culleton was a person who had been convicted and was subject to be sentenced for an offence punishable by imprisonment for one year or longer at the date of the 2016 election. That was so, both as a matter of fact and as a matter of law. The subsequent annulment of the conviction had no effect on that state of affairs. It follows from s 44(ii) that Senator Culleton was "incapable of being chosen" as a Senator. In the result, there is a vacancy in the representation of Western Australia in the Senate for the place for which Senator Culleton was returned.

=== Three ministers and contempt of court (2017) ===
Section 44(ii) nearly came into operation in June 2017, when three federal ministers were threatened with prosecution in Victoria for contempt of court. The ministers, all with law degrees, were Health Minister Greg Hunt, Human Services Minister Alan Tudge and Assistant Minister to the Treasurer Michael Sukkar. They had published in social media statements alleging that the Supreme Court of Victoria had been politically biased in handing down sentences for terrorism that the three considered to be much too light, and their statements had been reported on the front page of national newspaper The Australian. The Victorian Court of Appeal was soon to deliver judgment on prosecution appeals against the sentences. It asked the three, as well as staff of The Australian, to attend the court to comment on whether it should recommend that they all be prosecuted for contempt of that court, especially in that their statements could be read as attempting to prejudice the appeals. For each minister, a conviction could have engaged section 44(ii), resulting in their removal from the federal parliament; at that time the government did not have a majority in the Senate and had only a one-seat majority in the House of Representatives, of which all three ministers were members.

While The Australian immediately tendered a full apology, the ministers initially offered only an explanation, but, after criticism from the bench and in other media, they requested the court to accept a full retraction of their statements and an unconditional apology. (The ministers did not attend the court in person, pleading that they were required in parliament.) The court accepted the apologies, the Chief Justice stating that there had been a prima facie case for prosecution both of the ministers and of the newspaper, and that the ministers' contempt had been aggravated by the delay in providing a full retraction of the statements and in making an apology. Shortly before giving its decision about contempt, the court delivered its decision on the appeals, in which two of the sentences were substantially increased.

== (iii) Bankrupt or insolvent ==
=== Nile v Wood (1987) ===
A third part of Nile's challenge to Robert Wood's election was that Wood was insolvent, with Wood being described as "probably the only Member of Parliament to have been elected while on the dole". The High Court held that it was not enough to allege that Wood was insolvent; he had to have been adjudged to be an "undischarged insolvent".

=== Culleton (2017) ===
Other proceedings concerning Culleton concerned a creditor's petition in the Federal Court, seeking to have Culleton declared bankrupt. On 23 December 2016 the Federal Court made a sequestration order which had the effect of making Culleton an undischarged bankrupt. On 11 January, after receiving an official copy of the judgment, the President of the Senate wrote to the Governor of Western Australia, to notify her that Culleton's seat had become vacant due to his having become an undischarged bankrupt on 23 December 2016. Culleton commenced proceedings in the High Court to challenge the power of the President to declare his seat vacant, but this challenge was rejected by Justice Gageler on 31 January 2017. The sequestration order and therewith the finding of bankruptcy were confirmed by a full court of the Federal Court on 3 February 2017.

However, Culleton's bankruptcy ceased to determine his eligibility when, later on the same day but in a separate case, the High Court declared that he had been ineligible for election to the Senate owing to his conviction of an offence punishable with a sentence of one year or more, under subsection 44(ii).

== (iv) Office of profit under the Crown ==
Subsection 44(iv) refers to an "office of profit" in the traditional sense of a position carrying an entitlement to any form of financial benefit, including salary. As with the reference to "pension", part of the intention is prevent the Executive from corrupting a member by offering such a position. However, the provision has been interpreted to prevent any individual who is already in state employment from standing for parliament, even if they would have had to resign from that position if elected.

The Constitutional Commission report of 1988 recommended that s 44(iv) be replaced with more specific provisions; likewise in 1997 a committee of the House of Representatives, which termed s 44(iv) "something of a minefield".

=== Sykes v Cleary (1992) ===
In 1992, Independent candidate Phil Cleary was declared elected to the House of Representatives in a by-election for the Victorian seat of Wills. Sykes claimed that Cleary was disqualified by Constitution s 44(iv) and others by s 44(i). Cleary was a permanent secondary school teacher in the Victorian public school system. Mason CJ, Toohey and McHugh JJ held in a joint judgment (with which Brennan, Dawson and Gaudron JJ generally agreed) that the centuries-old phrase "office of profit under the Crown" includes today not only public servants as ordinarily understood, but extends to "at least those persons who are permanently employed by government" (para. 16). The Court decided by a 6:1 majority that Cleary held an "office of profit under the Crown" within the meaning of s 44(iv) and so had been "incapable of being chosen".

The reasons behind s 44(iv), so far as it concerns public servants, were said to derive from traditions of the British House of Commons: that a public servant could not simultaneously attend adequately to both the duties of a public servant and those of a member of the Parliament, and also could be subject to the opinions of the minister to whom they were responsible; this situation would impinge on both the independence of members of the Parliament and the maintenance of a "politically neutral public service". That neutrality also requires public servants to refrain from "active and public participation in party politics" (para. 14). These reasons apply to a public servant who is a permanent teacher, even though (it was accepted) "a teacher is not an instance of the archetypical public servant at whom the disqualification was primarily aimed" (para. 18).

It did not matter that Cleary was employed by "the Crown" in right of the State of Victoria and not in right of the Commonwealth; since the exception to s 44(iv) includes ministers of a State, s 44(iv) itself must include State officers. Nor that Cleary had been on leave without pay in order to fight the election; he continued to occupy the position. It did not matter, either, that Cleary had resigned from his position on hearing the outcome of the distribution of preferences and before the result was declared. The words "being chosen" were held to refer to a process of choice, which begins on the polling day. More fully, "incapable of being chosen" extends back to nomination. The process does not include the" declaration of the poll, which is only "the announcement of the choice made" (para. 25).

Deane J dissented, holding that it was sufficient if the candidate is qualified at the moment when the result of the poll is declared, by which point Cleary had resigned from his position. Deane was concerned that to require candidates always to be qualified at the point of nomination deters the more than ten per cent (at that time) of the workforce who are employed in the public service of the Commonwealth or a State. He thought that taking leave without pay or other emoluments, intending to resign if electoral success became apparent, is "preferable […] to the rather devious procedure of an ostensible termination of employment" under a guarantee of reinstatement if not elected, as has been established by Commonwealth and State legislation (para. 19). (Note: Each judgment is separately paragraph-numbered.)

=== Jeannie Ferris (1996) ===
During the period between the declaration of her election in March 1996 and taking her seat on 1 July of that year, Jeannie Ferris had been employed by Liberal Party Senator Nick Minchin. It was unclear at the time whether this constituted holding an "office of profit under the Crown" as specified in subsection 44(iv). To avoid the possibility of her election being declared invalid, Ferris resigned from the Senate only to be immediately re-appointed by the Parliament of South Australia to fill the casual vacancy that her resignation had created.

=== George Newhouse (2007) ===
At the 2007 federal election, it was claimed by the Liberal Party that George Newhouse, the high-profile Australian Labor Party candidate for the seat of Wentworth, was ineligible to stand for parliament under subsection 44(iv). The basis of the claim was that Newhouse had not resigned from the New South Wales Consumer Disputes Tribunal and so was occupying an "office of profit under the Crown". Liberal frontbencher Andrew Robb claimed that a by-election in Wentworth would be necessary if Newhouse were to win the seat, due to his ineligibility. The matter never came to a head, however, as Newhouse was comfortably defeated by the incumbent Liberal Party candidate and federal Minister Malcolm Turnbull.

=== Re Nash [No 2] (2017) ===
In the course of the 2017 Australian parliamentary eligibility crisis, replacements were appointed on 10 November 2017 to all Senate vacancies resulting from disqualification except the seat that had been occupied by Fiona Nash. The recount had indicated that Hollie Hughes should be declared elected and the Attorney-General had asked the High Court to so declare, but Hughes had then notified the Court that there was now a question over her eligibility. After the election, the Attorney-General had appointed defeated candidate Hughes to the federal Administrative Appeals Tribunal; it was not disputed that this was an office of profit under the Crown, which would disqualify Hughes under section 44(iv), and Hughes had resigned from it immediately after the Citizenship Seven decision, hoping that she would then be eligible in the recount. On 15 November the High Court heard submissions on this issue and declared Hughes to be ineligible, reserving its reasons. The reasons were given on 6 December. The Court unanimously found that the words "incapable of being chosen" in section 44 refer to the whole "process of being chosen", the "end-point" of which is a declaration that a candidate has been elected, and no declaration as to this seat had yet been made. A candidate had to be eligible throughout the process; Hughes had been ineligible during part of the process, owing to her tribunal appointment, and therefore could not be declared elected. The recount resumed excluding both Nash and Hughes, electing Jim Molan, the seventh candidate on the Liberals' and Nationals' joint ticket.

=== Andrew Bartlett (2017) ===
During the 2017 Australian parliamentary eligibility crisis, Andrew Bartlett replaced Senator Larissa Waters after a recount. At the time of nomination, Bartlett had been an academic employed by the Australian National University. He claimed to have legal advice that this did not disqualify him under s 44(iv) and his eligibility was not challenged at the same time as that of Hughes. However, the Commonwealth Solicitor-General has suggested that the Senate may need to refer his position to the High Court and the Greens are seeking further legal advice.

=== Steve Martin (2018) ===
After Senator Jacqui Lambie was found to be ineligible under s 44(i) owing to foreign citizenship, her apparent successor was deemed to be Steve Martin. Martin was mayor of Devonport, Tasmania throughout the period of the election; the question arose whether this was an office of profit under the Crown. The parties agreed that his position was an "office", that it was "of profit" and that the Executive branch of the Government of Tasmania was an element of "the Crown"; the issue was whether the office was "under" the Crown. This was understood to turn upon whether the executive government had "effective control" over appointment to the office (which was by election) or over the tenure or conduct of the office. The High Court, sitting as the federal Court of Disputed Returns on a reference from the Senate, reviewed the Australian and prior English history of the term "office of profit" and determined unanimously that Martin was not ineligible by reason of s 44(iv), there not being a sufficient degree of ministerial control over the tenure or conduct of the office of mayor.

Martin was the second-listed candidate for the Jacqui Lambie Network party in Tasmania. When found to be eligible, he could have stepped down, creating a casual vacancy to which Lambie could have been appointed. He refused to step down and was expelled from the party for disloyalty. He took his seat as an independent.

== (v) Pecuniary interest in an agreement with the Commonwealth ==
As with subsection 44(iv), the aim of subsection 44(v) is to prevent corruption of members by the Executive. It is also to avoid a conflict of interest that could lead a member of the Parliament to give priority to their own financial interest over impartial judgement of policy.

=== Re Webster (1975) ===
What constituted a "pecuniary interest" did not arise for consideration by the High Court until 1975 when the Senate referred questions concerning the eligibility of Senator James Webster who was a shareholder in and managing director of a company founded by his late grandfather. The company supplied timber and hardware, by public tender, to both the Postmaster-General's Department and the Department of Housing and Construction. Barwick CJ considered the history of the section and its predecessors, describing it as a vestigial part of the constitution. In his view, it had been inserted not to "protect the public against fraudulent conduct of members of the House", but rather to protect the independence of the parliament against influence by the Crown. On this basis Barwick CJ concluded that the interest "must be pecuniary in the sense that through the possibility of financial gain by the existence or the performance of the agreement, that person could conceivably be influenced by the Crown in relation to Parliamentary affairs".

The decision has been criticised as taking a narrow approach to the construction of the section that robs it of most of its efficacy, rendering it almost useless as a check upon would-be fraudulent politicians and offering "little practical protection to the public interest or Parliament's reputation".

If Webster had been found to have sat while ineligible, he would have been liable to a daily penalty under section 46 of the Constitution, which could have accumulated to more than $57,200. One consequence of the question about Webster's eligibility was the passage in 1975 of the Common Informers (Parliamentary Disqualifications) Act which limited any penalty prior to commencing the suit to $200; although, after the suit has commenced, there is a daily penalty of $200.

=== Warren Entsch (1999) ===
The issue arose again in 1999 concerning Warren Entsch and his interest in Cape York Concrete Pty Ltd who had a $175,000 contract to supply concrete for RAAF Scherger. Kim Beazley, the Leader of the Opposition moved that the Court of Disputed Returns should decide whether Entsch's seat in the House of Representatives had become vacant because he had a pecuniary interest in an agreement with the Commonwealth. The motion was lost and the House passed a resolution declaring that Entsch did not have a pecuniary interest within the meaning of section 44(v). Whether the House had power to pass the resolution has been questioned.

=== Re Day (2017) ===
On 1 November 2016, Bob Day resigned his seat as a Senator for South Australia, with immediate effect. Shortly after Day's resignation, the Senate referred the question of whether Day had been disqualified from sitting or being elected as a Senator due to an indirect pecuniary interest in the proceeds of a lease of part of a building in Adelaide which Day indirectly owned, as Day's electorate office. The Attorney-General argued that the reasoning of Barwick CJ in Re Webster was incorrect and that the purpose of the subsection was to protect the parliament from the potential for influence, whether that potential arises from the conduct of the executive or a conflict between the duty of a Parliamentarian and their financial interests. On 5 April 2017 the High Court held that Re Webster was wrong and should not be followed; its reasoning was based on consideration of the Convention Debates, as permitted since Cole v Whitfield in 1988. The Court held that Day had an "indirect pecuniary interest" in an agreement with the Commonwealth since at least February 2016 and therefore had not been eligible for nomination as a senator in July 2016. Consequently, his seat was declared vacant.

=== Barry O'Sullivan (2017) ===
In August 2017, it was reported that Liberal National Party Senator Barry O'Sullivan could be in breach of s 44(v) as a shareholder in a family construction company subcontracted for work on a federally funded road project in Queensland. O'Sullivan denied that the company had such a connection. O'Sullivan is a member of the Joint Standing Committee on Electoral Matters, which is reviewing s 44.

=== David Gillespie (2018) ===
Nationals member of the House of Representatives, David Gillespie came under scrutiny after the High Court ruling in the Bob Day case. In April 2017, the High Court found that, under section 44(v) of the Australian Constitution, Senator Day had not been eligible to hold public office because of an indirect pecuniary relationship with the Australian government. The Australian Labor Party (ALP) opposition and some community groups believed that Gillespie also had an indirect financial relationship with the federal government, in that he owned a suburban shopping complex in Port Macquarie which leased premises to an Australia Post licensee. In July 2017, the ALP launched a High Court challenge to Gillespie's eligibility as an MP. The case was formally brought by Peter Alley, the ALP candidate for Gillespie's seat of Lyne at the 2016 federal election. Hearings began on 23 August 2017, separately from the s 44(i) cases that commenced in the High Court on the following day.

The action against Gillespie was brought under s 3 of the Common Informers (Parliamentary Disqualifications) Act. This statute is a substitute for Constitution s 46 as authorised by that section. It provides that any person (known as a "common informer") can bring an action for a penalty against a Member of Parliament for sitting in Parliament while disqualified from doing so. During the proceeding, a question arose as to whether a common informer action could be brought against a Member of Parliament without a prior finding by the Court of Disputed Returns or the relevant House of Parliament. The High Court decided unanimously on 21 March 2018 that the Common Informers Act does not confer jurisdiction to determine the eligibility of a member: such jurisdiction is conferred exclusively by Constitution s 47 as substituted by s 376 of the Commonwealth Electoral Act 1918 and can exercised only upon a referral by the Parliament to the High Court under s 376; therefore the proceeding under the Common Informers Act "should be stayed until the question whether the defendant is incapable of sitting is determined" following such a referral. The Parliament has not made a referral with respect to Gillespie.

=== Peter Dutton (2018) ===
A Federal Court challenge to a migration decision made by Peter Dutton as Minister for Home Affairs claimed that the decision was invalid because he was disqualified under Constitution s 44(v). It was claimed that he had a pecuniary interest in an agreement with the public service of the Commonwealth, consisting of an interest in a childcare business that received a Commonwealth government subsidy. He had previously resisted Labor attempts to secure a referral to the High Court on this ground; Labor and he had produced conflicting legal advice. Government lawyers contended that the Federal Court does not have jurisdiction regarding parliamentary eligibility.

The challenge was dismissed on 16 August 2019, the court finding that it was "not appropriate to grant a potentially indefinite stay on the basis of a purely hypothetical sequence of events" and commenting: "A fundamental difficulty with the applicant's argument is that the relief sought is as against the minister in his ministerial capacity, rather than as against the minister personally".

== Exemptions ==
The office of Ministers of State are one category exempted from disqualification under subsection (iv). This exemption is necessary because Constitution s 64 requires a federal Minister (at least after three months from appointment) to be a senator or a member of the House of Representatives. The position of ministers assisting, parliamentary secretaries and for ministers without portfolio is problematic.

The wording of the exemption in relation to the armed forces has been described by law professor Tony Blackshield as "extremely obscure". In his view, while it is generally assumed to apply to "persons who are members of the defence forces other than in a full-time capacity", the obscurity renders that assumption doubtful; and there is some question as to members of the RAAF, which can be comfortably read as part of the "military forces" as elsewhere in the Constitution, but it is harder to include it in the expression "navy or army". It was not thought that active military service during World War I acted to disqualify Senator James O'Loghlin.

=== Free v Kelly (1996) ===
One aspect of the challenge to the election of Jackie Kelly in 1996 was that she was serving as an officer of the Royal Australian Air Force at the time of her nomination on 2 February 1996 prior to her transfer to the Air Force Reserve on 17 February. The majority in Sykes v Cleary had determined that the process of being chosen commences on nomination. Kelly subsequently conceded that she was incapable of being chosen because she was a full-time officer of the RAAF at the time of her nomination as a candidate. Blackshield suggested that Kelly's concession may have been greater than was necessary. Kelly won the subsequent by-election with an increased margin.
