= James O'Loghlin (politician) =

Australian politician

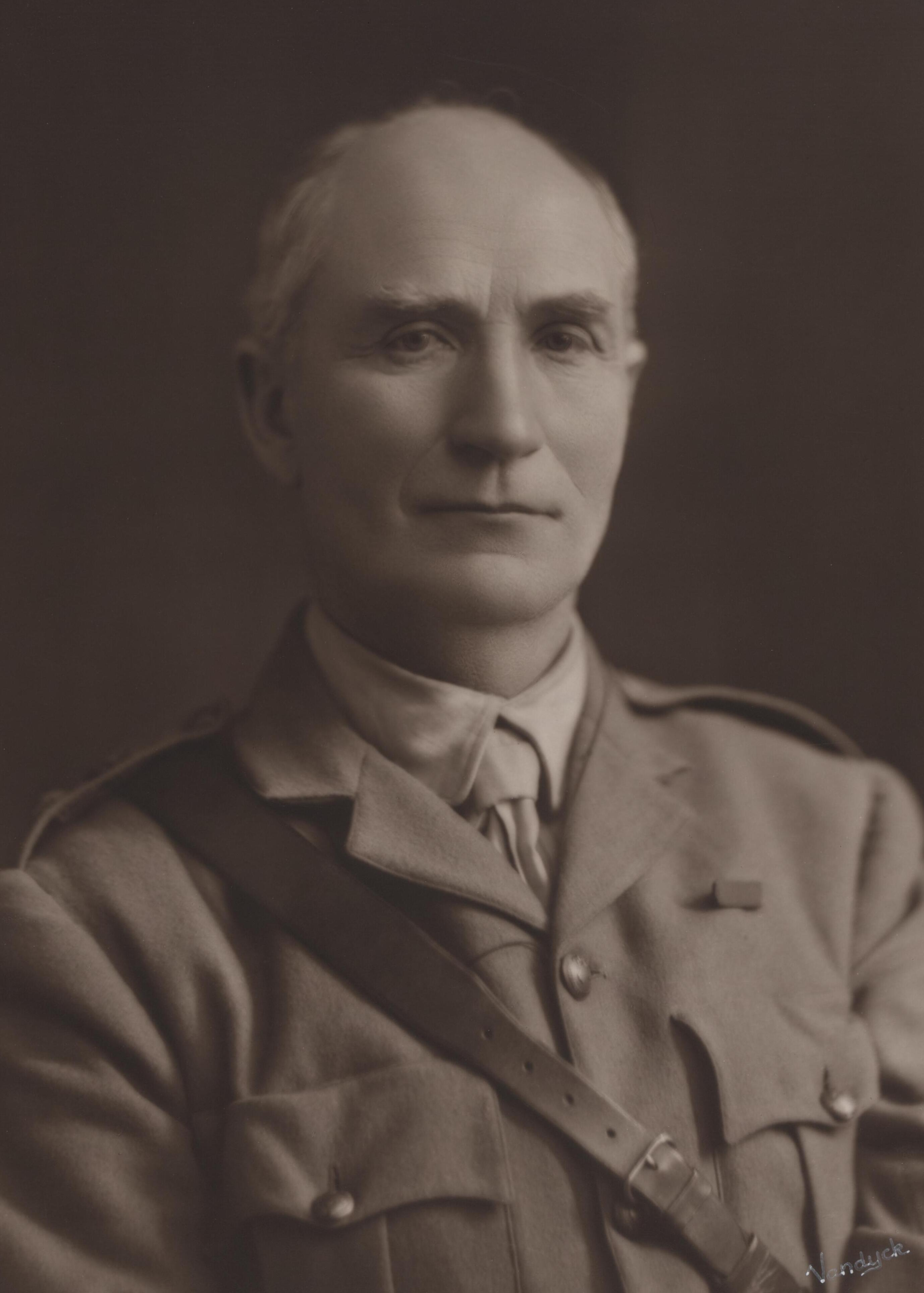

Senator for South Australia
- In office 11 July 1907 – 20 December 1907 (Note: Chosen by Parliament of South Australia on 11.7.1907; selection declared void on 20.12.1907.)
- Preceded by: Joseph Vardon
- Succeeded by: Joseph Vardon
- In office 1 July 1913 – 30 June 1920
- In office 1 July 1923 – 4 December 1925
- Succeeded by: Henry Barwell

Member of the South Australian Legislative Council for Northern District
- In office 19 May 1888 – 31 March 1902

Personal details
- Born: 25 November 1852 Gumeracha, South Australia
- Died: 4 December 1925 (aged 73)
- Party: Australian Labor Party
- Occupation: Journalist, soldier

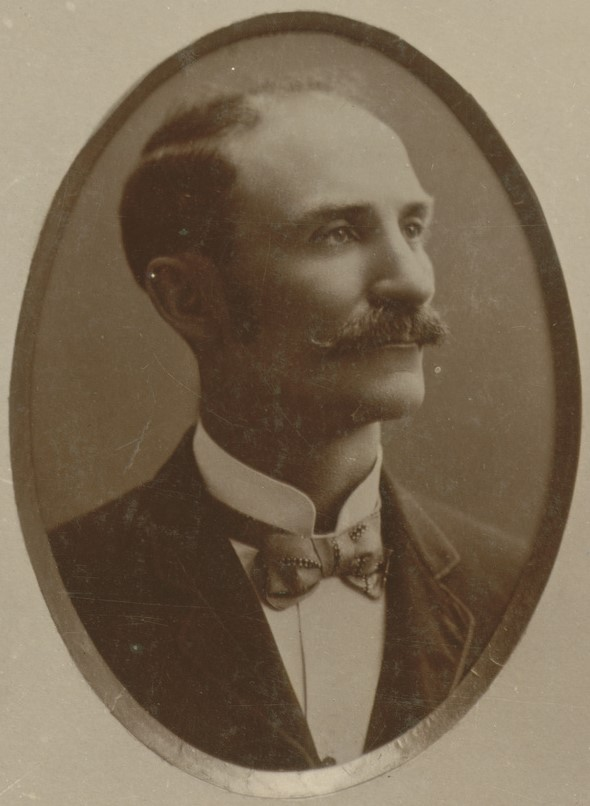
O'Loghlin in state politics

James Vincent O'Loghlin (25 November 1852 – 4 December 1925) was an Australian politician.

O'Loghlin was a member of the South Australian Legislative Council from 1888 to 1902, representing the Northern District, and was Chief Secretary under Charles Kingston from 1896 to 1899. He lost his Legislative Council seat in 1902; though he had been a liberal in state politics, he made unsuccessful campaigns for the Australian Senate as an Australian Labor Party candidate at the 1901 federal election and 1906 federal election. He was briefly appointed as a Labor Senator to a casual vacancy in 1907, but it was invalidated following an electoral dispute. He returned to state politics in 1910–1912, winning the South Australian House of Assembly seat of Flinders for Labor, but losing after one term.

He was elected to the Senate at his third attempt as a Labor candidate at the 1913 federal election, served overseas in World War I while in office, and remained with the Labor Party during the 1916 Labor split. He left office in 1920 after being defeated at the 1919 federal election, but was re-elected at the 1922 election, resuming his seat from 1923 until his death in 1925.

== Early life ==
O'Loghlin was born in Gumeracha, South Australia, a son of Susan (ca.1813 – 14 December 1883) and James O'Loghlin (ca.1811 – 5 September 1876), a pioneer farmer, who arrived in South Australia from Ireland in 1840. After being educated at Mr. Besley's Roman Catholic School at Kapunda and the Classical and Commercial Academy (under Mr. J. H. Potter) in the same town, he started farming with his father at Kapunda, Pinkerton, and Blyth, and afterwards at Pekina. He was next employed on the Hill River and Pinkerton stations, and later worked for the South Australian Carrying Company, which had a contract with the railways. He was next put in charge of the Farrell's Flat railway station, at that time a major junction. He was promoted to manager for the company at Gawler, where he remained until the contract system was abolished and the Government took over the whole of the railway goods traffic. O'Loghlin next became a wheat-buyer for the millers W. Duffield and Co. of Gawler; and when that firm was amalgamated with the Adelaide Milling and Mercantile Company he was appointed their agent at Terowie. While there, he and a Mr. Dawson, who had previously been editor of the Burra Record, founded the Terowie Enterprise and North-Eastern Advertiser, and subsequently became sole proprietor. He remained in the newspaper business for three years, and when in 1887 the Adelaide Milling Company moved him to Gladstone, he sold it.

== Politics ==
Shortly after his move to Gladstone, O'Loghlin was elected to its Town Council. In 1888, he was one of ten who sat for the two Northern District seats of the South Australian Legislative Council. John Darling headed the poll, and he won second seat. He moved to Adelaide and took up the post of editor and manager of The Southern Cross, a South Australian Catholic newspaper. He was a strong supporter of the Irish National League, and their South Australian delegate to the Irish-Australian Convention in Melbourne in November, 1883. He was also a prominent member of the Australian Natives' Association. O'Loghlin's retained a great popularity in the Northern District, and at the end of his term and he stood for re-election in 1892 he was returned at the head of the poll. In March 1896 Kingston appointed him Chief Secretary and Minister of Defence, retaining those posts until 1 December 1899 when their government was defeated. During that period he was the sole Government member in the Legislative Council. He lost his seat at the 1902 elections, after fourteen years of continuous service.

In State Parliament O'Loghlin was a member of the Barossa Water Commission, and was also a member of the Royal Commission which enquired into railway communication with the Queensland border. As leader of the Legislative Council he was dignified and tactful, and won the friendship of members, as well as their respect.

He was Minister for Defence in the Kingston Government, and in 1899 organised the first two South Australian contingents for service in South Africa in 1899.

=== Federal Parliament ===
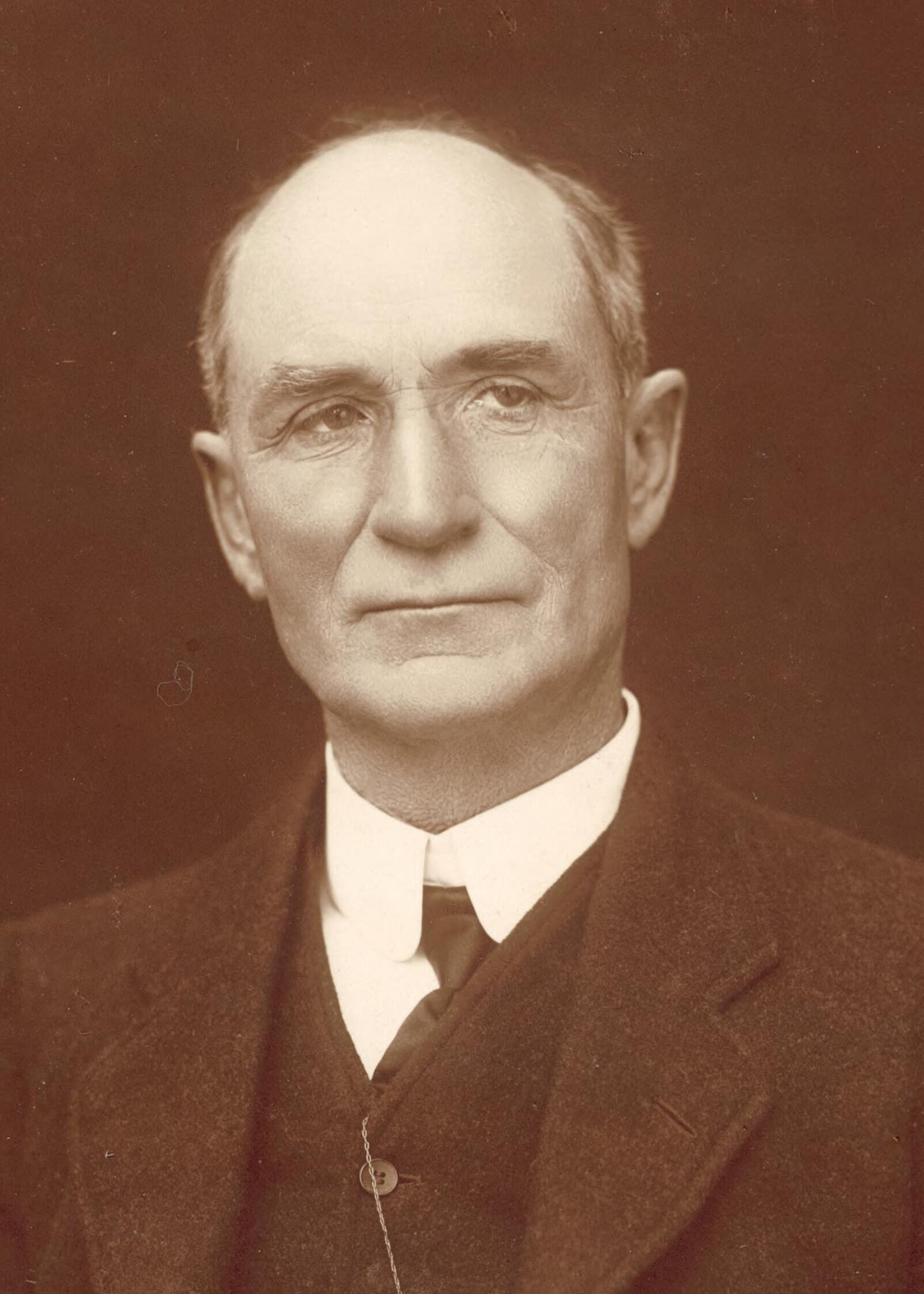
Undated photograph

Though a liberal in his first stint in state politics, O'Loghlin unsuccessfully contested the 1901 federal election for the Australian Labor Party. Whilst O'Loghlin was not a candidate at the 1906 federal election, when Anti-Socialist Senator Joseph Vardon's election was declared void, O'Loghlin was appointed by the Parliament of South Australia to the vacancy in the Australian Senate on 11 July 1907. However, on 20 December of the same year, O'Loghlin's appointment was declared void, and he and Vardon contested a special election on 15 February 1908, which was won by Vardon.

In between his two stints in federal politics, O'Loghlin had a brief return to state politics, holding Flinders, in the South Australian House of Assembly for one term from 1910 until his defeat in 1912.

In 1913 he was again a Labor candidate for the Senate, and was returned at the head of the poll, with John Newland and William Senior, and held his seat for six years. He was defeated in 1919, having been the only one of South Australia's five Labor senators not to defect to the Nationalist Party after the 1916 split over conscription. In 1922 O'Loghlin was elected with McHugh and Hoare, but died in 1925; the South Australian Nationalist Government successfully installed Nationalist Henry Barwell to his vacant seat.

Soon after the war broke out in 1914, though well past the fighting age, he had volunteered for overseas service, and in 1915 was sent as an officer commanding reinforcements for the First AIF to Egypt, Gallipoli, and France. On his return to Australia he was appointed a member of the Federal Parliamentary Recruiting Committee.

He died at his residence, "Glenvolo", Hawthorn, of tuberculosis, after a long period of ill-health. He left a widow, three sons, who were attending Christian Brothers' College, and one daughter, who was a pupil at the Convent of Mercy school in Angas Street, Adelaide.

== Family ==
He married Blanche Besley ( – 23 April 1929), daughter of John Besley (ca.1832 – 3 July 1916) of Mount Gambier, his erstwhile schoolmaster, on 23 January 1907. Their children were:

- son born 28 March 1908
- daughter born 12 December 1909
- son born 7 May 1912
- son born 19 October 1918

== A tribute ==
" He did good work for the State and the party he represented. ... He was not an orator in the ordinary acceptation of the term, but he had the gift of clear and lucid expression, and his utterances were always sincere, well thought out, and effective. As a Minister of the Crown in the Kingston Government he was a very active, loyal, and kindly colleague, and could always be relied upon for a just, if careful, decision As Chief Secretary he was alert and capable, and his record as a democratic legislator was of a high order. Senator O'Loghlin was also a capable journalist, and founded and edited with success the "Southern Cross". He had a racy pen, a fund of knowledge, and an excellent memory, all of which stood him in good stead in his writings."
