= 2017–18 Australian parliamentary eligibility crisis =

Crisis over the eligibility of members of the Parliament of Australia over citizenship

- Date: 7 July 2017 – 28 July 2018 (1 year and 3 weeks)
- Location: Canberra, Australian Capital Territory (Parliament House, High Court)
- Cause: Section 44 of the Australian Constitution
- Participants: See Overview
- Outcome: Eight senators and seven lower house MPs stepped down, either by resignation or High Court ruling.; Turnbull government briefly lost lower house majority in late 2017.; Countbacks held to replace senators.; Three minor parties (One Nation, JLN, NXT) lost one senator each as replacements became independents.; By-elections held for lower house MPs.; All members re-contested and returned to their seats, except in Batman.

Starting in July 2017, the eligibility of several members of the Parliament of Australia was questioned. Referred to by some as a "constitutional crisis", fifteen sitting politicians were ruled ineligible by the High Court of Australia (sitting as the Court of Disputed Returns) or resigned pre-emptively. The situation arose from section 44(i) of the Australian Constitution, which prohibits parliamentarians from having allegiance to a foreign power, especially citizenship. On that basis, the High Court had previously held that dual citizens are ineligible for election unless they have taken "reasonable steps" to renounce the foreign citizenship before nomination.

Six senators and Deputy Prime Minister Barnaby Joyce MP, known as the "Citizenship Seven", were referred (Note: Media reports in 2017 that a member has "referred her/himself" are inaccurate; the member has requested (or acquiesced in) a motion for reference by the house in which they sat.) to the High Court between August and September in 2017. In October 2017, the High Court unanimously determined that five were ineligible to be elected as dual citizens at the time of nomination. In November 2017, three more senators resigned after recognising their dual citizenship, including Senate President Stephen Parry, as did John Alexander MP. His resignation briefly cost the Coalition government its lower house majority, until Joyce and Alexander regained their seats in by-elections.

Following publication of a register of parliamentarians' citizenship status in December 2017, Senator Katy Gallagher and David Feeney MP were referred to the High Court. Feeney resigned in February 2018, before his case was heard. In May 2018, the High Court ruled that Gallagher was also ineligible, thereby clarifying the "reasonable steps" that must be taken when renouncing citizenship to gain exemption from section 44(i). As a result, four more House of Representative members under similar circumstances resigned their seats to re-contest them at by-elections.

The eight senators were replaced via High-Court-ordered countbacks, and were all replaced by candidates from the same tickets at the 2016 election. By-elections were held for the seats of the seven affected House of Representative members; six of the seven re-contested and won their seats, while another was won by a member of the same party.

The crisis prompted calls by some people for constitutional reform to prevent dual citizens from being disqualified, which would require a referendum. An opinion poll taken in late November to early December 2017 found overall opposition to changing section 44(i) of 49% to 47% (within the margin of error), with 5% undecided.

== Background ==
=== Legal requirements ===
Australian citizenship was created in 1949. Before then, Australians were British subjects. Australian law now requires Australian Senators and Representatives to have Australian citizenship, but the 1901 Australian Constitution does not. What Section 44(i) of the Constitution does require is that members not be "under any acknowledgement of allegiance, obedience, or adherence to a foreign power, or is a subject or a citizen or entitled to the rights or privileges of a subject or citizen of a foreign power".

Although the UK had not been a "foreign power" in 1901, it became one (at the latest) when the Australia Act 1986 severed all legislative and judicial ties between the UK and Australia (though they still share a monarch).

=== Earlier challenges and High Court interpretation ===
Section 44(i) has generally been interpreted by the High Court of Australia as meaning that persons with dual citizenship are not permitted to stand for election and that a person must take "reasonable steps" to renounce their citizenship of the other country. The section has rarely been invoked before.

In 1990, George Turner, a Sydney-based barrister and independent Senate candidate, threatened High Court action against federal parliamentarians holding dual citizenship. As a result, The Canberra Times reported that at least nine MPs elected at the 1987 federal election had renounced foreign citizenships.

In Sykes v Cleary (1992), a candidate who had been declared elected in a by-election was found ineligible under Section 44(iv) of the Constitution. The High Court ruled that both of the candidates who were likely to have been elected by a countback were ineligible under section 44(i). When they had become Australian citizens, they had renounced all foreign nationality (as Australian law then required), but they had not attempted to renounce under the law of their home countries and therefore were still subjects of a foreign power. They should have taken at least "reasonable steps" to do that, before nominating. "Reasonable steps" for any future candidate would depend on the individual circumstances. In 1999, in Sue v Hill, the High Court found that a British citizen who had been declared elected to the Senate in 1998 was disqualified under section 44(i).

=== Earlier application of section 44 in the 45th Parliament ===
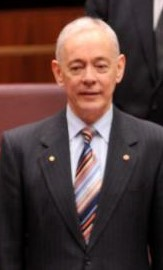
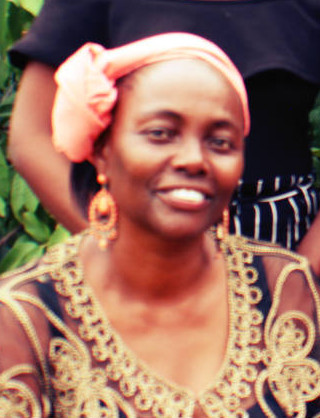
Former Senator Bob Day (left) and his replacement Lucy Gichuhi (right), who faced citizenship questions based on her Kenyan background. The High Court found that she was not a dual citizen and was free to take her seat in the Senate.

The prelude to the crisis began when Bob Day of the Family First Party resigned from the Senate on 1 November 2016 following the collapse of his business. Shortly after Day's resignation, the Senate referred to the High Court the validity of Day's election in July 2016 for a possible breach of section 44(v) of the Constitution. It provides that

a person who "has any direct or indirect pecuniary interest in any agreement with the Public Service of the Commonwealth ... shall be incapable of being chosen or of sitting" as a member of Parliament.

The basis of the complaint was that Day's Commonwealth-funded electorate office was leasing part of a building in Adelaide which he indirectly owned. The Commonwealth's payments of rent for the office would eventually come into a bank account of his own. In April 2017, the court found that Day was not validly elected at the 2016 election and ordered that a special count of South Australian ballot papers be held to determine his replacement. The court announced that Lucy Gichuhi was elected in his place. The Australian Labor Party lodged a challenge, claiming that Gichuhi might still be a citizen of Kenya, hence ineligible under Constitution section 44(i) as a citizen of a "foreign power". On 19 April 2017 a full court of the High Court found that the objection had not been proven and declared Gichuhi elected.

Senator Rodney Culleton, who had left Pauline Hanson's One Nation on 19 December 2016 to become an independent, had his eligibility to stand in the 2016 election challenged on two constitutional grounds. Among the grounds of ineligibility provided in Section 44, a person cannot sit in either house of the Parliament if they are bankrupt or have been convicted of a criminal offence carrying a potential prison sentence of one year or more. Culleton was declared bankrupt by the Federal Court on 23 December 2016. On 11 January 2017, after receiving an official copy of the judgment, the president of the Senate declared Culleton's seat vacant. Culleton's appeal against that judgment was dismissed by a full court of the Federal Court on 3 February 2017.

This judgment was followed later on the same day by the High Court's decision that Culleton was ineligible owing to conviction for a criminal offence carrying a potential prison sentence of one year or more. This was a decision as the Court of Disputed Returns following a reference by the Senate at the same time as with Day. It was decided that Culleton's possibility of a two-year sentence for larceny that had been in place at the time of the 2016 election rendered him ineligible for election, and that this was not affected by the subsequent annulment of that conviction. The court also held that the resulting vacancy should be filled by a countback of the ballots, in a manner to be determined by a single Justice of the Court. Following that count, on 10 March 2017, the High Court named Peter Georgiou as his replacement, returning One Nation to 4 seats.

=== Procedure ===
The Commonwealth Constitution provides the High Court with original and appellate jurisdiction, and also empowers the Commonwealth parliament to provide additional original jurisdiction. The parliament is also empowered to provide that questions of members' eligibility, of vacancies in either house and that disputed elections shall be determined other than by the relevant house, the position inherited from the Parliament of the United Kingdom. In exercise of these powers, the Commonwealth Electoral Act 1918, which governs federal elections, provides the High Court with a jurisdiction as the federal Court of Disputed Returns.

==== Petition by individual or AEC ====
An appropriately interested person, such as a losing candidate or a person entitled to vote in that constituency, may question the result (the "return of the writ") in a federal election by a petition to the High Court as Court of Disputed Returns, normally within 40 days of the result, or by the Australian Electoral Commission. The High Court may hear the whole case itself or may delegate factual questions for determination by the Federal Court; the High Court itself will determine the validity of a candidate's election or of the whole of that particular election, including issues of constitutional interpretation. The admissible grounds for a petition are generally at the Court's discretion but include corruption and do not extend to administrative errors that have not affected the result. The Court can compel production of documents and attendance of witnesses, and can examine witnesses on oath. However, the Court "must make its decision on a petition as quickly as is reasonable in the circumstances", it is not bound by strict rules of evidence, and all of its decisions "shall be final and conclusive and without appeal, and shall not be questioned in any way" (thus there is no recourse to the High Court in its other capacities or to the Parliament).

A decision of the Court of Disputed Returns may be made by a single judge, but an issue of constitutional interpretation is likely to be made by the Full Court. If the complaint is upheld, the decision and its effect will be one of the following:

(i) If any person returned is declared not to have been duly elected, the person shall cease to be a Senator or Member of the House of Representatives;
(ii) If any person not returned is declared to have been duly elected, the person may take his or her seat accordingly;
(iii) If any election is declared absolutely void a new election shall be held.

Costs will be as in ordinary proceedings in the High Court. The Commonwealth or any party to an unsuccessful petition may have to pay any or all of the costs.

==== Parliamentary reference ====
In addition, there may be a reference by resolution of either house of the parliament on "[a]ny question respecting the qualifications of a Senator or of a Member of the House of Representatives or respecting a vacancy in either House of the Parliament". The reference (commonly termed a referral) is communicated to the Court by, as appropriate, the Speaker of the House of Representatives or the president of the Senate. There is no time limit, but in other respects the procedure is the same as with a petition, although the Court may also allow or request other persons to be heard. The Court is empowered to declare:

(a) that any person was not qualified to be a Senator or a Member of the House of Representatives;
(b) that any person was not capable of being chosen or of sitting as a Senator or a Member of the House of Representatives; and
(c) that there is a vacancy in the Senate or in the House of Representatives.

In practice, the references request the Court to determine how a vacancy so arising should be filled. The full Court may order a countback and appoint one member of the Court to supervise the process and confirm the result.

==== Common informer action ====
Section 46 of the Constitution allows any member of the public to sue a member of the Parliament for a penalty of one hundred pounds (a very large sum in 1901) for every day on which they sit while disqualified, until the Parliament otherwise provides. The Common Informers (Parliamentary Disqualifications) Act 1975 (Cth) has now provided otherwise, fixing the penalty at a total of $200 for any parliamentarian who has sat while ineligible in the past 12 months and $200 per sitting day after the suit is instituted. It was uncertain whether the procedure could be used without a prior finding of disqualification by the Court of Disputed Returns or the relevant House. The question was the subject of a referral to the Full Court of the High Court in Alley v Gillespie, heard on 12 December 2017. The Full Court determined that the mechanism could only be invoked after a prior finding of ineligibility by the House of Representatives or the Senate (depending on which house the affected person was a member of), or by the High Court sitting as the Court of Disputed Returns under Part XXII of the Commonwealth Electoral Act 1918 (Cth) following a petition or referral. On 11 July 2018, Justice Gordon made orders in the High Court for the first time that judgment be entered for a plaintiff against defendants in a Common Informer action. The orders were by consent of parties: the plaintiff, and former Australian Greens Senators Scott Ludlam (sixth defendant) and Larissa Waters (seventh defendant). Ludlam and Waters were each ordered to pay the plaintiff $200.

In September 2017, before the High Court ruling on the eligibility of Malcolm Roberts, blogger Tony Magrathea initiated a High Court action alleging that Roberts had sat in the Senate while disqualified, contrary to the Common Informers Act. On 24 June 2019, the High Court found the allegation proved and ordered Roberts to pay a penalty of $6,000 to Magrathea.

== Timeline ==
June 2017
John Cameron, a barrister from Perth, applies to the New Zealand Department of Internal Affairs to search the register of New Zealand citizens. He intended to confirm whether co-deputy leader of the Greens, Scott Ludlam, and founder of the Justice Party, Derryn Hinch, had renounced their New Zealand citizenships as required under section 44(i) of the Constitution.
7 July 2017
Having discovered that Ludlam, unlike Hinch, had not renounced his New Zealand citizenship, Cameron notifies Ludlam after also informing the Clerk of the Australian Senate.
14 July 2017
Ludlam resigns after being informed that he still holds New Zealand citizenship from his birth in New Zealand. Several foreign-born parliamentarians begin releasing confirmation of their renunciation of foreign citizenship, most notably former Prime Minister Tony Abbott.
18 July 2017
Ludlam's fellow co-deputy leader of the Greens, Senator Larissa Waters, resigns after similarly discovering that she holds Canadian citizenship. Ludlam's resignation had prompted her to review her own status.
25 July 2017
Liberal National Party Senator Matt Canavan resigns as Minister for Resources and Northern Australia over doubts as to his eligibility to be a member of parliament. This occurred after discovering that he was considered by the Italian authorities to be a citizen of Italy. The government took the view that he is not in breach of the Constitution as the registration was not made with Canavan's knowledge or consent.
8 August 2017
The Senate refers Ludlam, Waters, and Canavan to the High Court as the Court of Disputed Returns. Canavan states that he will not be voting in the Senate until the High Court decision. BuzzFeed reports that One Nation Senator Malcolm Roberts, who was born in India to an Australian mother and a British father, was a British citizen at the age of 19.
9 August 2017
Senate refers Roberts to the High Court.
14 August 2017
Deputy Prime Minister and leader of the National Party, Barnaby Joyce MP announces that the New Zealand government has informed him that he might be a citizen of New Zealand by descent from his father. The House of Representatives refers Joyce to the High Court.
17 August 2017
Deputy leader of the National Party and Senator Fiona Nash reveals that she has British citizenship by descent through her Scottish father. She elects not to step down from leadership or cabinet until the High Court hands down a ruling.
19 August 2017
Nick Xenophon Team leader and Senator Nick Xenophon announces that British authorities have confirmed that he is a British Overseas citizen. He chooses not to resign from Parliament in anticipation of the High Court decision.
24 August 2017
A directions hearing takes place in the High Court sitting as the Court of Disputed Returns for the cases of Joyce, Canavan, Roberts, Ludlam and Waters. The government requests that these cases be heard by the Full Court in early September, but the Court schedules them to be heard over three days from 10 October.
4 September 2017
The Senate refers the matters of Nash and Xenophon to the High Court as the Court of Disputed Returns.
27 October 2017
The High Court hands down its judgment in for the "Citizenship Seven". Ludlam, Waters, Roberts, Joyce, and Nash are all ruled ineligible to have been elected, while Canavan and Xenophon are cleared. A writ for a by-election in Joyce's former seat of New England is issued for 2 December.
31 October - 1 November 2017
Liberal Senator and President of the Senate Stephen Parry reveals that he is enquiring whether he holds British citizenship through his father, who was born in the United Kingdom. On 1 November, Parry announces that he has received confirmation that he holds British citizenship, and resigns the following day.
6 November 2017
Fairfax Media reports that Liberal MP John Alexander may have British citizenship through his father, who was born in the United Kingdom. Alexander states that he believes his father's British citizenship had been renounced before he was born, but that he would enquire about his citizenship status with British authorities.
8 November 2017
Jacqui Lambie Network Senator Jacqui Lambie reveals that her father was born in Scotland, causing questions to be raised about her citizenship status. Lambie states that she has no concerns about her citizenship.
10 November 2017
Results of the countback for replacements for Ludlam, Waters, Roberts, and Nash are announced. They are Jordon Steele-John of the Greens, Andrew Bartlett of the Greens, Fraser Anning of One Nation, and Hollie Hughes of the Liberal Party. However, the High Court delays confirmation of Hughes since she might be ineligible under section 44(iv) of the Constitution as a holder of an office of profit under the Crown. Following her apparent election defeat, Hughes was appointed to the Administrative Appeals Tribunal, an office of profit under the Crown, but resigned from the tribunal 45 minutes after Nash was found ineligible and prior to the recount.
11 November 2017
Alexander reveals British authorities could find no evidence his father had renounced his citizenship, and announces his intention to resign.
13 November 2017
Steele-John, Bartlett, and Anning are sworn in as senators. Anning immediately resigns from One Nation to sit as an independent. Alexander officially resigns. Writs are issued for a by-election in Alexander's former seat of Bennelong for 16 December. The Coalition Government and Labor Opposition strike a deal, requiring all parliamentarians to disclose details relating to their citizenship status by 1 December or 21 days after being sworn in. The scheme is adopted on the same day by the Senate; it is to be considered by the House of Representatives when it next meets, scheduled at 4 December, so that the disclosure deadline for MPs is expected to be at 5 December.
14 November 2017
Jacqui Lambie resigns, after receiving confirmation that she does hold British citizenship by descent from her father.
15 November 2017
The High Court finds Hollie Hughes ineligible to be elected to the Senate. Senate refers Parry and Lambie to High Court.
20 November 2017
The High Court rules that, after Hughes was found ineligible, Nash's seat will be filled by a countback excluding Hughes as well.
22 November 2017
Nick Xenophon Team Senator Skye Kakoschke-Moore announces her immediate resignation, after confirming she holds British citizenship. The first under the new requirement for Senators to table details of their citizenship status.
28 November 2017
Turnbull establishes an inquiry by the Joint Standing Committee on Electoral Matters (JSCEM) into Section 44, especially section 44(i). Senate refers Kakoschke-Moore to High Court.
2 December 2017
Joyce is re-elected with an increased majority at the New England by-election.
4 December 2017
The Senate citizenship register is published.
5 December 2017
The House of Representatives citizenship register is published.
6 December 2017
The High Court releases the reasons for its decision that Hollie Hughes is ineligible to succeed Fiona Nash. The House refers Labor MP, David Feeney to the High Court as the Court of Disputed Returns and Senate refers Labor Senator, Katy Gallagher. A House motion to refer several other MPs, from both major parties and from the crossbench, proposed by Opposition and opposed by Government, is lost on a tied vote. Senate establishes a JSCEM inquiry into possible disclosure mechanisms for parts of section 44 other than section 44(i) - to overlap with the JSCEM inquiry established by the Government on 28 November.
8 December 2017
Directions hearings take place in the High Court sitting as the Court of Disputed Returns for the cases of Parry, Lambie, and Kakoschke-Moore. The Government-established JSCEM inquiry into Section 44 begins public hearings.
16 December 2017
John Alexander is re-elected in Bennelong by-election.
22 December 2017
High Court declares Jim Molan duly elected to replace Senator Fiona Nash on countback.
19 January 2018
A directions hearing takes place in the High Court sitting as the Court of Disputed Returns for the cases of David Feeney and Katy Gallagher, and is adjourned due to lack of availability of constitutional experts.
1 February 2018
Feeney resigns, having been unable to find documentation proving his dual citizenship was renounced, and will not re-contest the resultant by-election.
6 February 2018
A report of the Senate-established JSCEM inquiry into possible disclosure mechanisms for parts of section 44 other than section 44(i) is published.
6 February 2018
The High Court finds that Steve Martin is eligible to be elected and orders that the recount for a successor to Jacqui Lambie proceed with Martin included; the Court publishes its reasons on 14 March 2018.
14 March 2018
The High Court hears the case of Katy Gallagher.
17 March 2018
The Batman by-election is held to fill David Feeney's former seat. Ged Kearney holds the seat for Labor.
21 March 2018
The High Court publishes its reasons in the case of Skye Kakoschke-Moore.
The High Court decides, in the case of David Gillespie, that the Common Informers Act does not give it jurisdiction to decide on eligibility, that is a question for parliament with possible referral to the High Court or petition under Part XXII of the Commonwealth Electoral Act 1918 (Cth).
23 March 2018
Report due from Government-established JSCEM inquiry, regarding section 44(i)—not yet reported.
29 March 2018
Six disqualified members are excused all liability for expenses, including salary and staff, incurred while not qualified. The expenses of five more recently disqualified members are still to be considered.
9 May 2018
The High Court finds Senator Katy Gallagher ineligible. Following this, four House of Representatives members (Rebekha Sharkie, Josh Wilson, Susan Lamb and Justine Keay) announce their resignations.
17 May 2018
The parliamentary Joint Standing Committee on Electoral Matters recommends a referendum to change section 44.
23 May 2018
The High Court declares David Smith duly elected to replace Senator Katy Gallagher.
30 June 2018
A report from the Government-established JSCEM inquiry, regarding parts of section 44 other than 44(i), is due.
11 July 2018
Justice Gordon makes orders in the High Court for the first time that judgment be entered for a plaintiff against defendants in a Common Informer action. The orders were by consent of parties: David Barrow (plaintiff) and former Australian Greens Senators Scott Ludlam (sixth defendant) and Larissa Waters (seventh defendant).
28 July 2018
By-elections are held for the seats of Braddon, Fremantle, Longman and Mayo, the seats of the four members who resigned on 9 May. All four former members are re-elected.

== Overview of changes ==
Parliamentarian	Party	Dual citizenship		Resignation date	Referral date	Date ruled	Replacement			
Parliamentarian	Party	Nation	Source	Resignation date	Referral date	Date ruled	Method	Name	Party	Date
Senator Scott Ludlam	Greens	New Zealand	Birth	14 July 2017	8 August 2017	27 October 2017	Countback	Jordon Steele-John	Greens	10 November 2017
Senator Larissa Waters	Greens	Canada	Birth	18 July 2017	8 August 2017	27 October 2017	Countback	Andrew Bartlett	Greens	10 November 2017
Senator Malcolm Roberts	One Nation	United Kingdom	Birth	—N/a	9 August 2017	27 October 2017	Countback	Fraser Anning	One Nation (Note: While Fraser Anning was on the One Nation ticket at the 2016 election, he resigned from the party to sit as an independent shortly after being sworn in.)	10 November 2017
Barnaby Joyce MP	National	New Zealand	Descent	—N/a	14 August 2017	27 October 2017	By-election	Barnaby Joyce (re-elected)	National	2 December 2017
Senator Fiona Nash	National	United Kingdom	Descent	—N/a	4 September 2017	27 October 2017	Countback	Jim Molan	Liberal	22 December 2017
Senator Stephen Parry	Liberal	United Kingdom	Descent	2 November 2017	15 November 2017	8 December 2017	Countback	Richard Colbeck	Liberal	9 February 2018
John Alexander MP	Liberal	United Kingdom	Descent	13 November 2017	—N/a	—N/a	By-election	John Alexander (re-elected)	Liberal	16 December 2017
Senator Jacqui Lambie	JLN	United Kingdom	Descent	14 November 2017	15 November 2017	8 December 2017	Countback	Steve Martin	Independent (Note: While Steve Martin was on the Jacqui Lambie Network (JLN) ticket at the 2016 election, he was expelled from the party by Lambie on 7 February 2018, before he took office.)	9 February 2018
Senator Skye Kakoschke-Moore	NXT (Note: The Nick Xenophon Team (NXT) was renamed Centre Alliance in April 2018.)	United Kingdom	Descent	22 November 2017	28 November 2017	24 January 2018	Countback	Tim Storer	Independent (Note: While Tim Storer was on the NXT ticket at the 2016 election, he resigned from the party in November 2017, after an unsuccessful attempt to fill the casual vacancy left by party leader Nick Xenophon's Senate resignation.)	16 February 2018
Senator Katy Gallagher	Labor	United Kingdom	Descent	—N/a	6 December 2017	9 May 2018	Countback	David Smith	Labor	23 May 2018
David Feeney MP	Labor	United Kingdom	Descent	1 February 2018	6 December 2017	23 February 2018	By-election	Ged Kearney	Labor	17 March 2018
Justine Keay MP	Labor	United Kingdom	Descent	10 May 2018	—N/a	—N/a	By-election	Justine Keay (re-elected)	Labor	28 July 2018
Susan Lamb MP	Labor	United Kingdom	Descent	10 May 2018	—N/a	—N/a	By-election	Susan Lamb (re-elected)	Labor	28 July 2018
Josh Wilson MP	Labor	United Kingdom	Birth	10 May 2018	—N/a	—N/a	By-election	Josh Wilson (re-elected)	Labor	28 July 2018
Rebekha Sharkie MP	Centre Alliance	United Kingdom	Birth	11 May 2018	—N/a	—N/a	By-election	Rebekha Sharkie (re-elected)	Centre Alliance	28 July 2018

== Citizenship Seven case ==
During 2017 several cases of possible breach of section 44(i) came to light, and in two cases (Ludlam and Waters) the member had resigned from the Parliament. All cases but one (Joyce) arose in the Senate. The cases involving Ludlam, Waters, Canavan, Roberts and Joyce were referred in August to the High Court as the Court of Disputed Returns, followed the next month by those of Nash and Xenophon; each reference, both those by the Senate and that by the House of Representatives, had all-party support.

At the hearing, the Attorney-General for Australia had argued that five of the seven parliamentarians should be exempt from disqualification, excluding Ludlam and Roberts, since they were entirely unaware of their dual citizenship. This argument was not accepted by the High Court, meaning the five parliamentarians found to have held a foreign citizenship were ineligible for election. Canavan and Xenophon were the only two of the seven not found to have held a foreign citizenship.

=== Parliamentarians alleged to have dual citizenship ===
==== Scott Ludlam ====
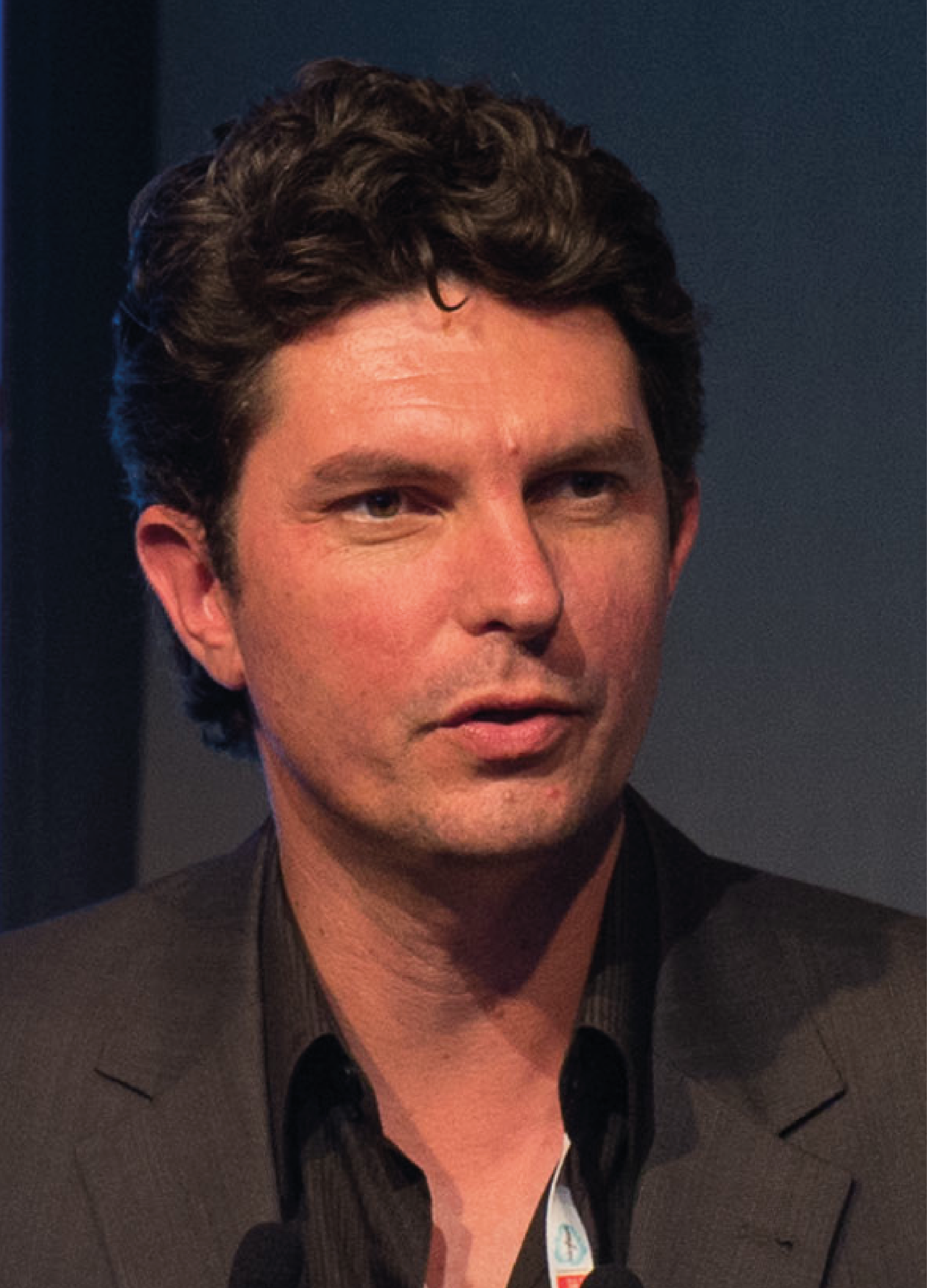
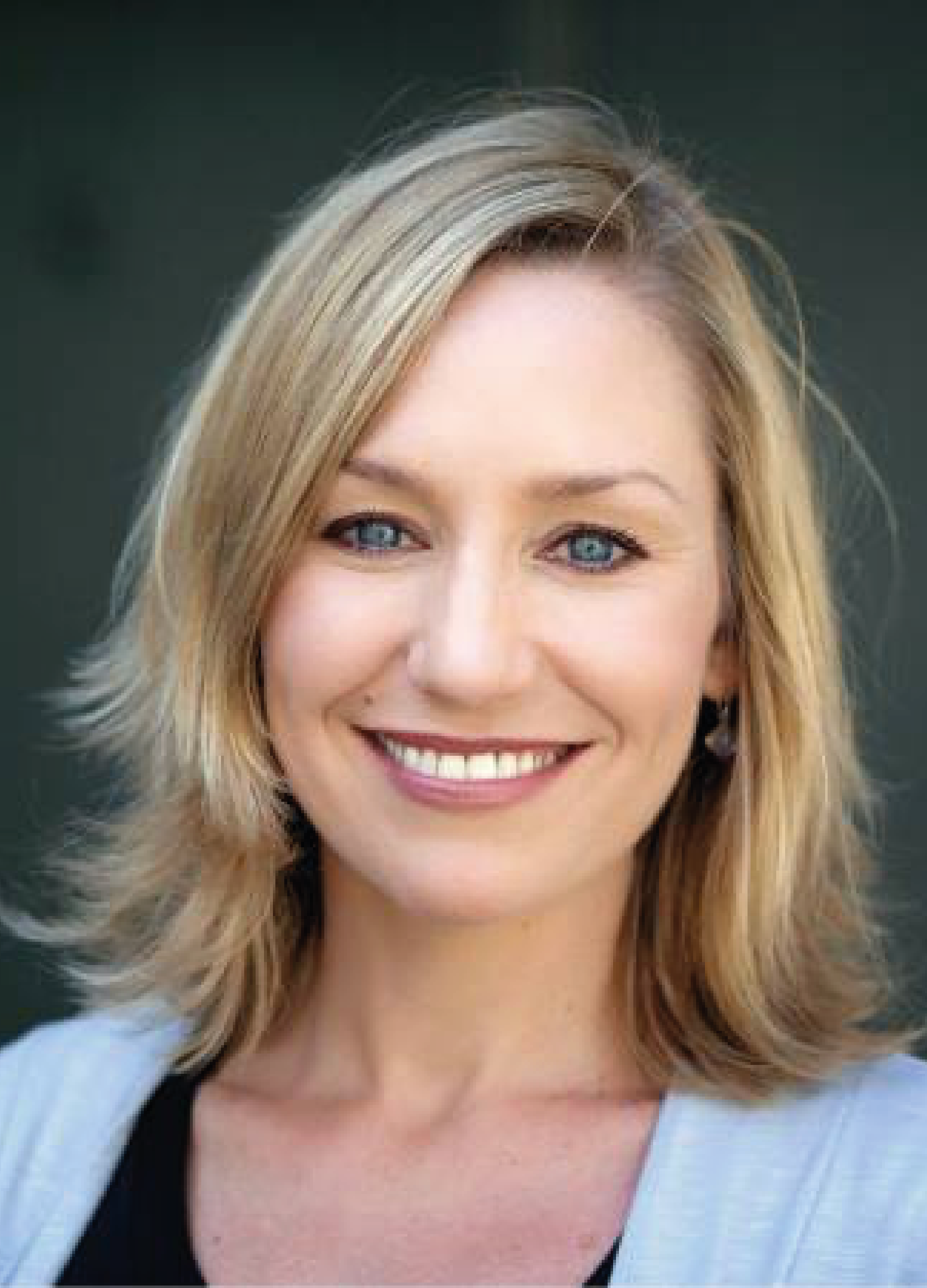
Scott Ludlam's (left) resignation from parliament and subsequent investigation sparked similar discoveries for many fellow elected parliamentarians, including fellow Senator Larissa Waters (right).

Scott Ludlam had been a Greens senator for Western Australia since 1 July 2008.

On 14 July 2017, Ludlam announced that he still retained New Zealand citizenship from his birth in New Zealand, and consequently would be resigning from parliament. Ludlam with his family had settled in Australia aged eight, and had previously assumed he lost his New Zealand citizenship when he naturalised as an Australian citizen in his mid-teens. Since Ludlam was ultimately found to have been ineligible to be elected, his seat was filled by a countback of the 2016 federal election in Western Australia, resulting in Jordon Steele-John, the next un-elected Greens candidate on the Senate ticket in Western Australia, winning the seat. Steele-John is a 23-year-old disability rights advocate, who is Australia's youngest senator in history.

As of 8 October 2017, Ludlam has not renounced his New Zealand citizenship and has no immediate plans to return to politics.

==== Larissa Waters ====
Larissa Waters had been a Greens senator for Queensland since 1 July 2011.

The revelation of Ludlam's dual citizenship prompted Ludlam's fellow co-deputy leader of the Greens, Senator Larissa Waters, to similarly check whether she also held Canadian citizenship. On discovering that she did, she resigned on 18 July 2017, four days after Ludlam. Waters was born in Canada to Australian parents who briefly lived there. The family returned to Australia while Waters was still a baby. She had previously believed that she was solely an Australian citizen, and that if she had wished to gain Canadian citizenship she would have needed to take active steps before age 21. However, she discovered she had in fact always held Canadian citizenship by birth. Her seat was filled by a countback, returning former Democrats leader Andrew Bartlett, who held the second position after Waters on the Greens' 2016 Senate ticket in Queensland, to the Senate.

On 8 August 2017 the Senate resolved, with all-party support, to refer the matters of Ludlam and Waters, as well as that of Matt Canavan, to the High Court as Court of Disputed Returns.

Waters applied for renunciation of her Canadian citizenship on 27 July, which came into effect on 5 August, and she announced she would seek to re-enter the Senate. On 6 September 2018, Waters was appointed to fill the casual vacancy caused by the resignation of her replacement, Andrew Bartlett, to contest the House of Representatives division of Brisbane.

==== Matt Canavan ====
Matt Canavan has been a Liberal National Party senator for Queensland since 1 July 2014, and a Minister since 18 February 2016.

On 25 July 2017, Canavan resigned from his positions of Minister for Resources and Northern Australia over doubts as to his eligibility to be a member of the parliament, after discovering that he was considered by the Italian authorities to be a citizen of Italy.

Canavan's mother had registered him as an Italian resident abroad with the Italian consulate in Brisbane in 2006. Canavan stated he was unaware of this until his mother was prompted to inform him following news of the resignation of two Greens senators holding dual citizenship. The government took the view that he is not in breach of the Constitution as the registration was not made with Canavan's knowledge or consent.

On 8 August 2017, with all-party support, the Senate referred the position of Canavan, along with the cases of Ludlam and Waters, to the High Court as Court of Disputed Returns. The Attorney-General indicated that the Commonwealth will argue, in favour of Cavanan, that section 44(i) requires a personal acknowledgement of the connection. Canavan spoke in support and stated that he would not be voting in the Senate until the High Court decision.

Canavan lodged the renunciation of his Italian citizenship on 8 August. As of 24 August, he accepted that, owing to a change in Italian law in 1983, he had been an Italian citizen since he was two years old. However, the Court has been told that Italian experts are uncertain of the effect of that change: one view is that it conferred citizenship automatically, the other that it only conferred eligibility to "activate" citizenship; on the latter view, which Canavan's counsel has proposed be preferred, Canavan has never been an Italian citizen.

Canavan expressed uncertainty over whether, if he was disqualified, he would have chosen to remain in politics. If he had been disqualified, it was expected that the seat would go to Joanna Lindgren, who lost her Senate seat when the Queensland LNP's vote share was reduced at the 2016 election.

The High Court found that Canavan's mother had registered him as an Italian resident abroad, but that this did not amount to a declaration of Italian citizenship, thus Canavan was not disqualified.

==== Malcolm Roberts ====
Malcolm Roberts was born in India of an Australian mother and a British father. Roberts is an Australian citizen, and on 8 August 2017 documents were revealed by BuzzFeed indicating that Roberts was a British citizen at the age of 19. Roberts released a statutory declaration stating that he was only a citizen of Australia. A spokesperson for Roberts stated that Roberts was "choosing to believe that he was never British". Doubts persisted about the status of Roberts' Indian citizenship after it was argued in the media that under a precedent set by the Supreme Court of India, he continued to be a 'presumed citizen' of the country.

On 9 August the Senate, with all-party support, referred Roberts' position to the High Court as Court of Disputed Returns. The reference was moved by Roberts's party leader Pauline Hanson, with his support. He did not respond to a question in the Senate whether he would be voting before the Court's decision.

Justice Patrick Keane conducted a hearing to determine factual issues on 21 September. Roberts and his sister Barbara were cross examined as well as two expert witnesses on British citizenship. The following day, Keane handed down his findings on that evidence, finding that at the date of his nomination for the Senate (1) Roberts was a British citizen, (2) he knew that there was at least a real and substantial prospect that he was a British citizen and (3) Roberts could have, but did not, take steps to renounce his British citizenship.

Roberts's seat was filled by a countback, which led to his replacement by the third candidate on the Queensland One Nation ticket, Fraser Anning. Despite concerns that Anning would also be ineligible due to bankruptcy, in a similar case to One Nation's Rod Culleton, the bankruptcy petition against him had been withdrawn by 3 October. After he was sworn in, Anning resigned or was expelled from One Nation and opted to sit as an independent.

After learning of his disqualification on 27 October, Roberts announced that he would run for the electoral district of Ipswich in the Queensland state election in November. He was not elected.

In September 2017, before the High Court ruling on Roberts's eligibility, blogger Tony Magrathea initiated a High Court action alleging that Roberts had sat in the Senate while disqualified, contrary to the Common Informers (Parliamentary Disqualifications) Act 1975. On 24 June 2019, the High Court found the allegation proved and ordered Roberts to pay a penalty of $6,000 to Magrathea.

==== Barnaby Joyce ====
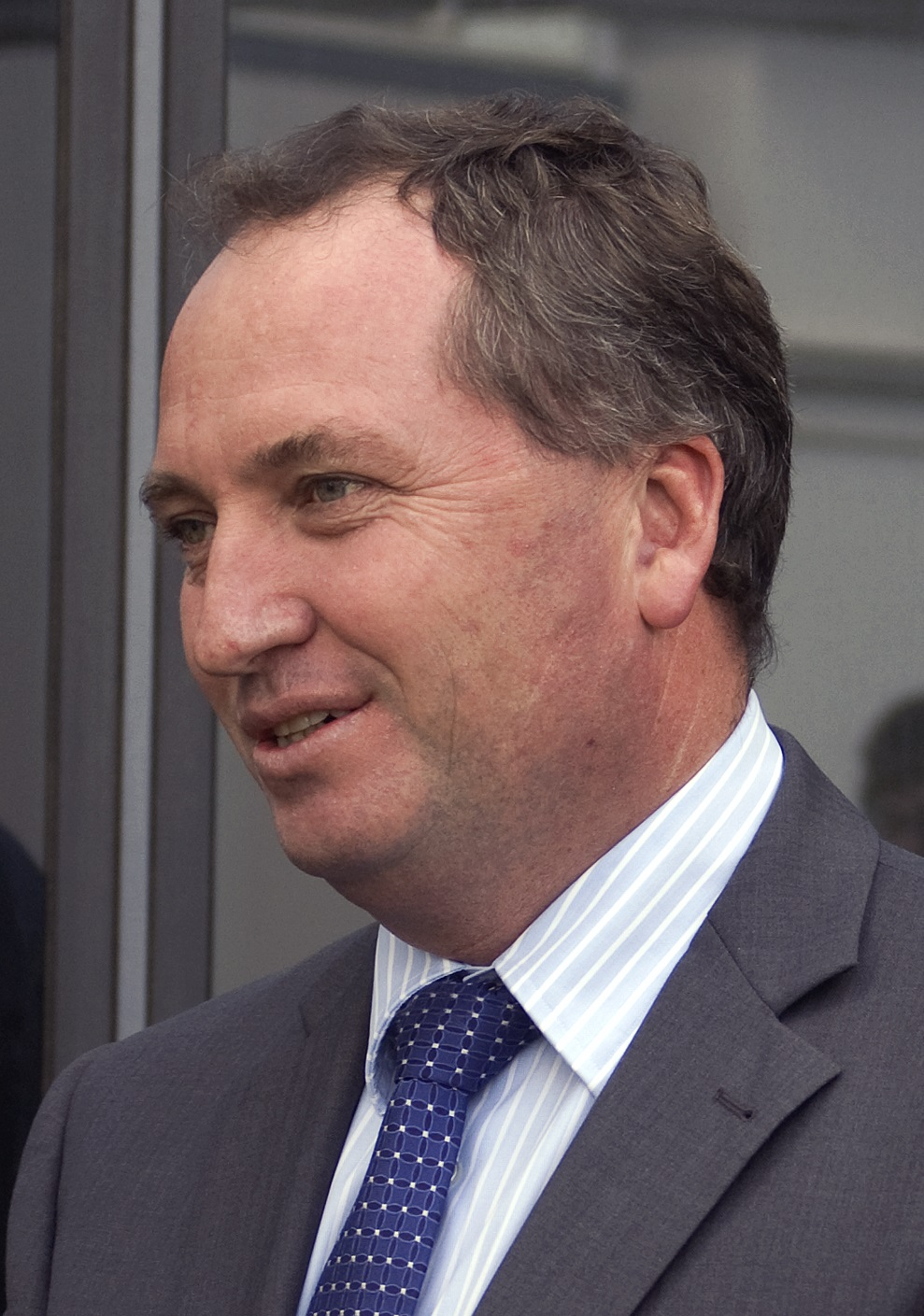
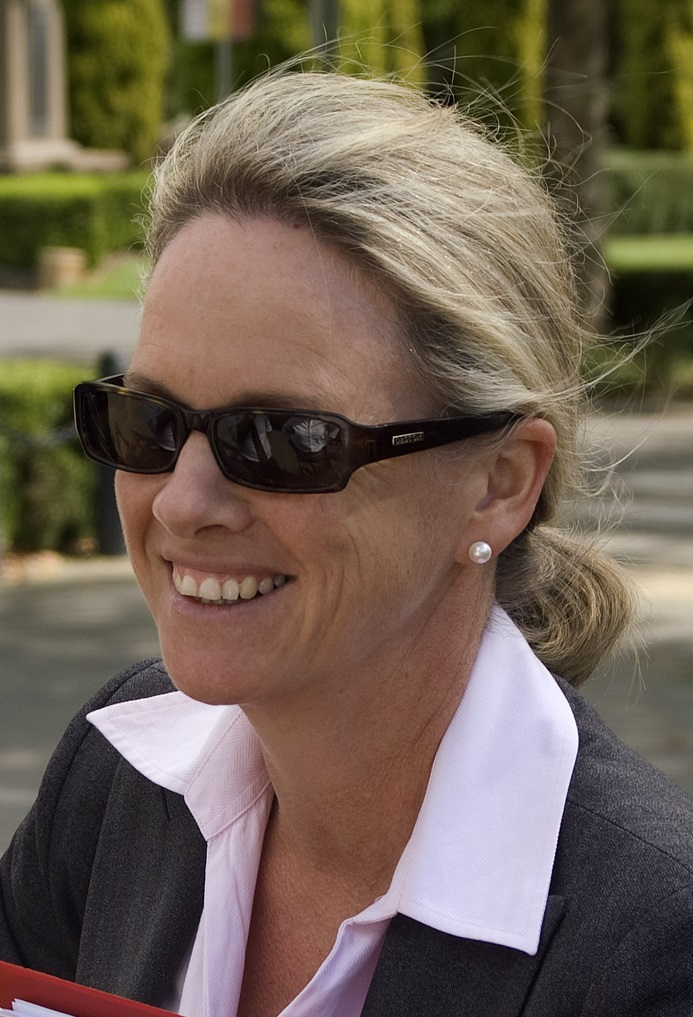
Both the leader and the deputy leader of the Nationals, MP Barnaby Joyce (left) and Senator Fiona Nash (right), have been involved in the crisis after discovering they hold dual citizenship.

Barnaby Joyce had been a National Party member of the House of Representatives seat of New England, New South Wales since 7 September 2013. Previously, he was a senator for Queensland from 1 July 2005. He had been a Minister since 18 September 2013, and Deputy Prime Minister since 18 February 2016.

On 14 August 2017, Joyce announced that the New Zealand government had informed him that he might be a citizen of New Zealand by descent from his father, saying that he was "shocked to receive this information". At his request, the government moved in the House of Representatives that Joyce's position be referred to the High Court as the Court of Disputed Returns, which was carried with all-party support. Prime Minister Malcolm Turnbull stated that legal advice from the Solicitor-General confirmed Joyce's eligibility, but refused to release that advice or to say how it may have distinguished Joyce's position from that of Canavan.

Joyce renounced his New Zealand citizenship effective 15 August and produced documentary evidence of having done so. He did not resign from his ministerial offices and continued to vote in Parliament. It was reported that two leading experts on constitutional law did not share the government's total confidence about Joyce's eligibility.

The High Court permitted Tony Windsor, the independent former MP who was defeated by Joyce for the Division of New England in the 2016 general election, to be joined as a "contradictor" (Note: An additional party may be joined with the court's permission where there is "no proper contradictor"—that is, where "there is no party in the proceedings who can appropriately put forward an opposing view to the court or tribunal" in a case of "significant public importance", i.e. where "the outcome of the matter has significant implications for the wider public, which go beyond the interests and concerns of the parties involved in the proceedings". The contradictor could be the Attorney-General, but in this case the Attorney-General (Cth) argued, in effect, on behalf of Joyce.) in the eligibility case. Windsor's lawyers, including former Solicitor-General Justin Gleeson, argued against the Attorney-General's defence of ignorance of dual citizenship. Windsor expressed interest in running against Joyce in a resultant New England by-election, although the then-Deputy Prime Minister held the seat by a comfortable margin and his re-election was considered likely. After the High Court's decision was handed down on 27 October, Windsor declared that he would not run in the resulting by-election.

In the by-election on 2 December 2017, Joyce was elected with almost two thirds of the vote and an increased majority; he took his seat on 6 December.

==== Fiona Nash ====
Fiona Nash had been a National Party senator for New South Wales since 1 July 2005, and a Minister since 21 September 2015.

Three days after the announcement from Nationals leader Joyce, on 17 August 2017, Nationals deputy leader and Senator, Nash revealed that she had British citizenship by descent through her Scottish father. She elected not to step down from leadership or cabinet while she was referred to the High Court. By 27 August, Nash had renounced her British citizenship, but on 4 September the Senate referred her case to the High Court. On 27 October, in the Citizenship Seven Case, the High Court found that, as a foreign citizen, Nash had not been eligible to nominate; the replacements for all members declared to be disqualified would be determined by a countback.

When the other replacement senators were appointed on 10 November 2017, the countback indicated that Hollie Hughes—the first unelected candidate on the Coalition New South Wales Senate ticket—should be declared elected, but Hughes' own eligibility was in doubt. After Hughes was ostensibly an unsuccessful candidate at the previous election, she had been appointed to the federal Administrative Appeals Tribunal, an office of profit under the Crown, which would disqualify Hughes under section 44(iv) of the Constitution; Hughes had resigned from this job immediately after the Citizenship Seven decision, hoping that she would then be eligible in the countback. On 15 November the High Court found Hughes to be ineligible, releasing its reasons on 6 December. The Court unanimously found that the words "incapable of being chosen" in section 44 refer to the whole "process of being chosen", the "end-point" of which is a declaration that a candidate has been elected, and a declaration as to this seat was now pending. A candidate had to be eligible throughout the whole process—Hughes had been ineligible during part of the process, owing to her tribunal appointment, and therefore could not be declared elected.

Due to Hughes also being found ineligible, the High Court ordered another countback to determine who should be declared elected to the seat, this time excluding both Nash and Hughes. This countback resulted in Jim Molan, the next unelected candidate on the Coalition New South Wales Senate ticket, being declared elected. While Nash is a member of the National Party, Molan and Hughes are both members of the Liberal Party, due to the Liberal and National Parties running a joint New South Wales Senate ticket, meaning that Molan's election altered the representation balance of the two parties within the coalition.

==== Nick Xenophon ====
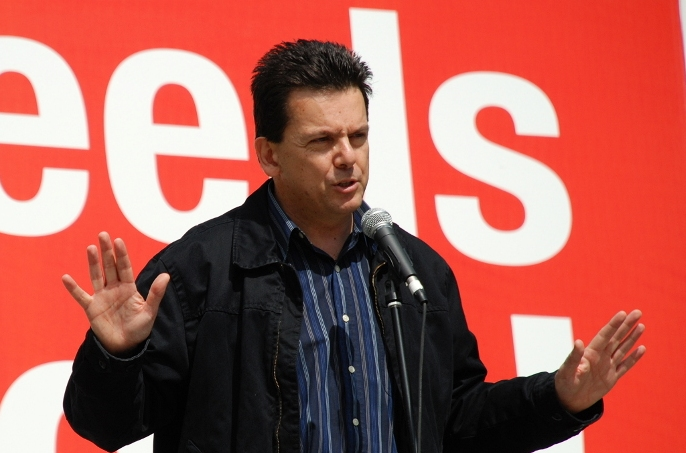
Nick Xenophon, initially questioned for Greek or Cypriot citizenship, was confirmed by British authorities to be a British Overseas citizen.

Nick Xenophon was the leader of the Nick Xenophon Team and had been a Senator for South Australia since 1 July 2008.

In August 2017, he was asked whether he might have acquired Greek citizenship through his mother, born in Greece, and British or Cypriot nationality through his father, an ethnic Greek who was born in Cyprus when it was a British colony and who possessed a British passport. He stated: "I've never had, never sought, never received citizenship of another country but out of an abundance of caution I wrote to the Greek embassy and Cypriot high commission saying essentially, 'I've never been a citizen, I don't want to be, so if there's any question that I could be, I renounce any rights to be'. I don't know what else I can do in the circumstances." He added that he had not received replies to these enquiries. Later he said he had renounced Greek citizenship but, on finding he might be British, he had sought clarification from British authorities. On 19 August, he announced that British authorities had confirmed he is a British Overseas citizen, a lesser form of British nationality. He stated that he would not resign from the Parliament, but would await a High Court decision. Together with that of Nash, Xenophon's case was referred to the Court on 4 September.

On 6 October 2017, Xenophon announced he would resign from the Senate to stand for the Parliament of South Australia at the South Australian state election due in March 2018. He did not name a date of resignation, although he did state his intention to remain in federal parliament until the High Court ruled on whether he had been validly elected.

The High Court ruled that Xenophon's status as a British Overseas citizen did not fall within section 44(i), so that he had been validly elected.

=== Judgment ===
In Re Canavan; Re Ludlam; Re Waters; Re Roberts [No 2]; Re Joyce; Re Nash; Re Xenophon (the "Citizenship Seven Case"), the High Court sat as the Court of Disputed Returns to determine the eligibility of seven parliamentarians to have been elected and to sit.

Because of the political implications of the outcome of the case, the Court's decision was intensely anticipated. In the preliminary hearing on 12 October 2017, Chief Justice Susan Kiefel observed: "It is hardly necessary to say that the Court is aware of the need to give its answers to these references with or without reasons as soon as possible. As counsel and instructing solicitors would appreciate, it is not always possible for the Court to do so immediately."

On 27 October 2017 the High Court handed down its single joint judgment. In a unanimous judgment, the Court interpreted section 44(i) according to the "ordinary and natural meaning" of its language. On that approach, it firstly affirmed the view taken in Sykes v Cleary that the question of eligibility is to be determined with reference to the point of nomination. The Court then followed the reasoning of the majority in Sykes v Cleary. It decided that the fact of citizenship was disqualifying, regardless of whether the person knew of the citizenship or engaged in any voluntary act of acquisition. It emphasised that to hold otherwise would introduce an element of subjectivity that "would be inimical to the stability of representative government". It followed that each of Joyce, Ludlam, Nash, Roberts and Waters had been ineligible to be elected. However, Canavan and Xenophon had been eligible. It was determined that, under the "reasonable view" of Italian law that the Court adopted, Canavan was not a citizen of Italy. It was found that Xenophon was a British Overseas citizen, but that this did not give him the right to enter or reside in the United Kingdom; therefore, for the purposes of section 44(i), he was neither a citizen nor entitled to the rights and privileges of a citizen of the United Kingdom. The Court declared the seats of the ineligible members to be vacant; it ordered that the vacancy in the House of Representatives be filled through a by-election and that the vacancies in the Senate be filled by "special counts" (recounts or countbacks) of the ballot papers in each State, subject to supervision by a Justice of the Court.

=== Senate replacements ===
The High Court's judgment on 27 October 2017 removed Joyce, Nash and Roberts from the Parliament. Ludlam and Waters had already resigned. Two of the ousted MPs—Joyce and Nash—were members of Cabinet, requiring a rearrangement of the Second Turnbull Ministry, which took place on the same day. Canavan, who had stepped down from Cabinet pending the court's decision, returned to Cabinet upon not being found ineligible, retaking his Resources and Minister for Northern Australia portfolios, which had been temporarily held by Joyce. Prime Minister Malcolm Turnbull took on Joyce's other portfolio of Agriculture and Water Resources. Nash's roles were given to Darren Chester and Mitch Fifield as acting ministers. Nigel Scullion became the parliamentary leader of the National Party, while the position of Deputy Prime Minister remained vacant. Julie Bishop, deputy leader of the Liberal Party, served as acting prime minister when necessary.

The seats of the disqualified Senators were filled by countbacks of the 2016 Senate election results in their states of Western Australia, Queensland and New South Wales. The countback results were announced on 10 November: in Western Australia, the Greens' Scott Ludlam was to be replaced by the Greens' Jordon Steele-John; in Queensland, the Greens' Larissa Waters was to be replaced by former Australian Democrats leader and current Greens member Andrew Bartlett, One Nation's Malcolm Roberts was to be replaced by One Nation's Fraser Anning, and the Nationals' Fiona Nash was to be replaced by Liberal Hollie Hughes. However, the court delayed the appointment of Nationals' Fiona Nash's replacement Liberal Hollie Hughes due to concerns that Hughes may be ineligible under section 44(iv) of the Constitution as a holder of an office of profit under the Crown; Hughes was reappointed to the Administrative Appeals Tribunal – a role that would ordinarily disqualify her under that section – in the period following her apparent election defeat but resigned from the position prior to the recount. The question was whether her tenure of that office had overlapped with the process of the election.

Steele-John, Bartlett, and Anning were sworn in as senators on 13 November 2017; however, Anning immediately resigned from One Nation to sit as an independent. On 15 November, the High Court ruled that Hughes was not eligible to fill Nash's seat. Nash's seat was instead filled by another countback excluding both Nash and Hughes, which elected Liberal Jim Molan.

=== Aftermath ===
A writ for a by-election for 2 December in Joyce's former seat of New England was issued on the same day as the High Court's judgment. Losing this seat would cause the Coalition to lose its majority. On the following day, the National Party endorsed Joyce as its candidate. Joyce was now eligible for election, having renounced his New Zealand citizenship in August 2017.

Immediately following the decision, Prime Minister Malcolm Turnbull said that the government would consider changes to section 44 through the Joint Standing Committee on Electoral Matters or changes to "electoral laws and practices to minimise the risk of candidates being in breach" of the section. On 29 October, however, Attorney-General George Brandis ruled out constitutional change, although considering changes to electoral laws. He also criticised the decision: "We were asking the High Court to look at the section in view of its purpose and history, the High Court instead took the view that the section should be read with a very strict, almost brutal literalism." However, he added that the law was now clear and that it was a "good thing" that the decision had been unanimous. All of section 44 has already been examined extensively, particularly by a Constitutional Commission in 1988 and by a parliamentary committee in 1997, but their proposals have not been pursued.

According to some legal opinions, more than 100 Turnbull government decisions are vulnerable to legal challenge as a result of Joyce and Nash's dual citizenship status, with lawyers concluding there is a high likelihood that the work the pair has done over the last year will end up before the courts, because of section 64 of the constitution, which requires ministers to be members of Parliament. The court could decide, however, that the decisions are valid because they were made by a person who was "clothed with the authority of an office".

The disqualified senators and members had collected over $9 million in base salary, ministerial bonuses and other allowances over the period that they were ineligible to sit. The government could demand repayment of such amounts or it can waive repayment. In Re Culleton (No 2) (2017), for example, the government demanded repayment from Rod Culleton, after he was found to have been ineligible, as "a debt to the commonwealth", and indicated it might also seek repayment of superannuation payments, other entitlements and staff payments. There is also possibility of an action being brought under s 3 of the Common Informers (Parliamentary Disqualifications) Act 1975, which provides that any person can bring an action for a penalty against a member of parliament for sitting in Parliament while disqualified from doing so. The government had undertaken to pay the legal costs of all parties and of Tony Windsor (intervening in the Joyce case). The final legal bill paid by the government was $11.6 million. In March 2018, the government waived the debt for salaries and expenses (salaries, superannuation and electorate allowances, as well as non-salary expenses, such as, staff expenses, office expenses and travel expenses) received by the six MPs who lost their jobs as a result of dual citizenship, saying that they acted "in good faith".

Amid continuing allegations that further members of the Parliament possess dual citizenship, there have been increasing calls for a "citizenship audit" of the Parliament, as well as speculations on the Prime Minister's own future. The audit proposal comes from minor parties and is opposed by the two major parties, although Labor has come to support some sort of parliamentary review. Both major parties appear to have been conducting their own internal reviews. The Greens plan to propose a select committee of the Senate, to report on the eligibility of all Senate members by 27 November, and hope that a similar committee may be established in the House or, alternatively, there could be a joint committee if not a commission of inquiry.

On 6 November, Prime Minister Turnbull proposed a set of measures under which all federal politicians would be required to publicly declare their citizenship history. The Labor Opposition had criticisms. On 13 November it was reported that the Government and the Opposition had agreed to propose what media termed a "quasi-audit", modelled on the pecuniary interests register. All members of the federal parliament were required to disclose by 1 December their date and place of birth, citizenship at birth, and details of their parents and grandparents; if they were born overseas, details of their naturalisation as Australian citizens; and an account of how they have satisfied themselves that they are not dual citizens and what they have done to renounce any foreign ties of this kind. Failure to fully comply with the register, including provision of misleading information, may constitute "serious contempt" of Parliament (a criminal offence). This scheme was adopted on that day by the Senate and was confirmed by the House of Representatives when it next met.

The Citizenship Seven referrals to the High Court were all moved by the member's own party, consistently with parliamentary convention. On 9 November 2017, Prime Minister Turnbull threatened to break with convention and use government-party numbers to secure a referral by the House of three Labor MPs: Justine Keay, Susan Lamb and Josh Wilson. The threat was repeated by a senior minister on 12 November, despite the government having lost its majority in the House.

On 28 November 2017, Prime Minister Malcolm Turnbull asked the Commonwealth Parliament's Joint Standing Committee on Electoral Matters (JSCEM) to conduct a new inquiry into the section, including the possibility of amendment. The report was published on 17 May 2018. On 6 December 2017, the Senate asked the JSCEM to inquire into recent referrals to the High Court as Court of Disputed Returns, with a view to establishing a disclosure mechanism for the other parts of section 44, with particular attention to the cases of Culleton and Day. The report was published on 6 February 2018.

In the lead-up to the 2019 federal election, the AEC's form for nomination has been updated to ask detailed questions on whether candidates are disqualified under section 44. Three Victorian Liberal candidates, and two in New South Wales have had to withdraw based on section 44 issues.

== Other MPs and Senators who have resigned or been judged ineligible ==
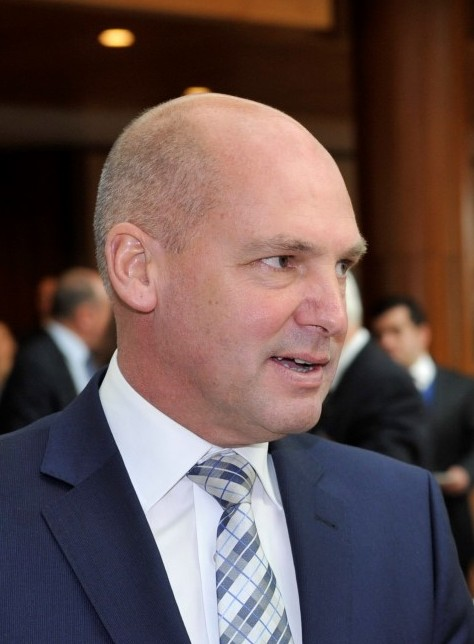
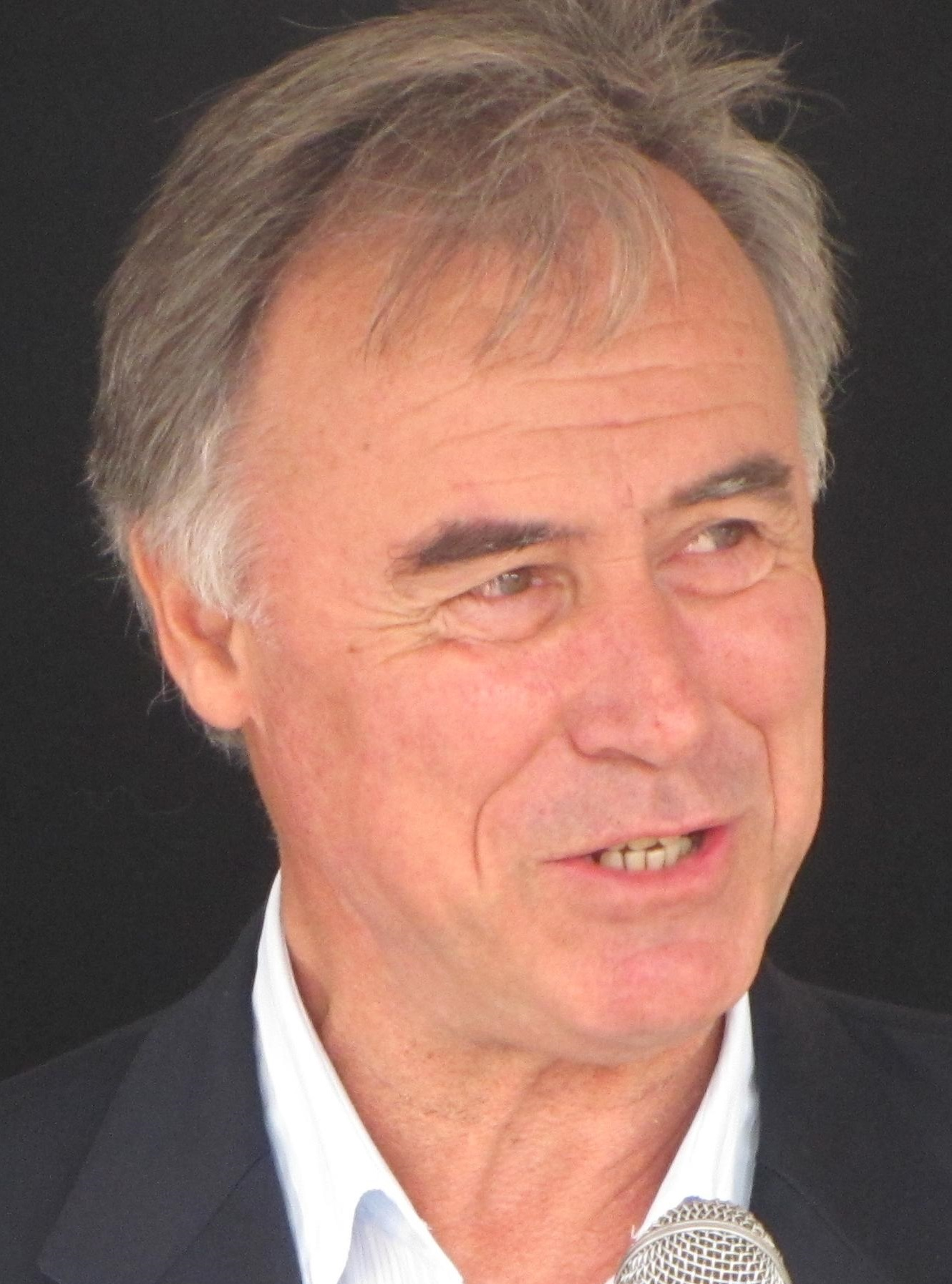
Liberal Party parliamentarians Stephen Parry (left) and John Alexander (right) both held British citizenship by descent from their fathers, and resigned in November 2017.

=== Stephen Parry ===
Stephen Parry had been a Liberal senator for Tasmania since 1 July 2005, and President of the Senate since 7 July 2014. Following the High Court's judgment in the Citizenship Seven case, Parry announced on 31 October 2017 that he was seeking advice from British authorities on whether he held British citizenship by descent. Parry's father moved to Australia from the United Kingdom in the 1950s. On 1 November, Parry confirmed his dual citizenship, and resigned on 2 November.

It has been reported that Parry became aware of his possible dual citizenship status following the revelations involving Fiona Nash in August 2017, and had discussed the matter with cabinet member Mitch Fifield months earlier, who advised him not to raise those concerns publicly due to the belief that both Canavan and Joyce would be found to be eligible. Fifield was referred to the privileges committee in relation to this. On 2 November, Prime Minister and Liberal Party leader Malcolm Turnbull said that he was "disappointed" that Parry had not made the matter known "quite some time ago" to allow his election to be referred to the court simultaneously with the previous seven cases.

The Senate referred Parry's case to the High Court as the Court of Disputed Returns. A directions hearing on 8 December determined that Parry was disqualified from standing at the 2016 election and that the Senate vacancy should be filled by a special count of the 2016 votes. The countback took place on 12 December 2017. Parry's senate position was filled by Richard Colbeck, who was sworn in on 12 February 2018.

=== John Alexander ===
On 6 November, Fairfax Media reported that Liberal MP John Alexander might hold British citizenship by descent, through his British-born father who migrated from the United Kingdom to Australia in 1911 at the age of three. Alexander stated that he believed his father's British citizenship had been renounced before he was born, but that he was making enquiries about his citizenship status with British authorities. Meanwhile, the federal Opposition accused the government of a "protection racket" and called for Alexander's case to be referred to the High Court.

On 11 November, Alexander announced that British authorities could not find any record of renunciation by his father and indicated his intention to resign. On 13 November, Alexander resigned and the by-election was called for 16 December, the earliest date possible. Alexander immediately filed papers with the UK Home Office to renounce British citizenship and on 17 November claimed that the application had been approved, making him eligible to stand in the by-election. John Alexander won the by-election.

=== Jacqui Lambie ===
On 8 November 2017, it was reported that independent Senator Jacqui Lambie may have British citizenship by descent from her father, who migrated from Scotland to Australia as an infant. Lambie had initially said she had "no concerns" about the possibility of her being a dual citizen, with a spokeswoman stating that Lambie would provide any relevant supporting documents when required to by Parliament. However, she sought advice from British authorities.

On 14 November 2017, Lambie announced her resignation from the Senate after confirming she held British citizenship, and the Senate referred her case to the High Court as the Court of Disputed Returns on the same day. A directions hearing on 8 December determined that Lambie was disqualified from standing at the 2016 election and that the Senate vacancy should be filled by a special count of the 2016 votes. The countback took place on 12 December 2017. The Electoral Office indicated that Steven Martin would be elected on a countback, and Martin was sworn in on 12 February 2018. However, Martin was the Mayor and Councillor of Devonport City Council, and the question of whether this disqualifies him from serving as a senator by reason of s 44(iv) of the Constitution (holding an office of profit under the Crown) was referred to the Full Court on 13 December 2017. On 6 February 2018 the Full Court determined that Martin was not ineligible; it published its reasons on 14 March 2018.

=== Skye Kakoschke-Moore ===
Nick Xenophon Team (NXT) Senator Skye Kakoschke-Moore resigned from the Senate on 22 November 2017, after discovering that she was a British citizen by descent from her mother, who was born in Singapore while it was a British colony and had registered for right of abode in the UK. Kakoschke-Moore had been a British citizen since birth in 1985, but stated that when she was 12, the British embassy in Oman had told her father she was not eligible for a British passport. Kakoschke-Moore's renunciation of her British citizenship became effective on 6 December 2017.

The Senate referred Kakoschke-Moore's case to the High Court as the Court of Disputed Returns on 29 November 2017. Kakoschke-Moore sought to be reinstated in the seat on the basis that she had by then effectively renounced British citizenship, but the Court held that "the fact that Skye Kakoschke-Moore renounced her British citizenship with effect from 6 December 2017 does not render her capable of now being chosen to fill that vacancy", and that the vacancy should be filled by a special count of the votes. Kakoschke-Moore and Timothy Storer had both been nominated for the 2016 election for the Senate for South Australia as nominees of NXT. However, since the election Storer had ceased to be a member of NXT by 6 November 2017, and the question of whether Storer should be excluded from the special count for that reason was referred to the Full Court, which on 13 February 2018 ruled that Storer was not to be excluded from the countback, and who assumed the seat on 16 February 2018. The Court published its reasons on 21 March 2018.

=== David Feeney ===
Labor MP for Batman David Feeney stated in the citizenship register that his father was born in Northern Ireland, and that he was advised by the party to ensure he renounced British (and potentially Irish) citizenship before nominating. Feeney said he did so in late 2007, but conceded he was unable to produce documentation confirming the renunciation had been registered.

The House of Representatives referred Feeney's case to the High Court as the Court of Disputed Returns. During a directions hearing on 19 January 2018, Feeney was unable to submit evidence of his renunciation of citizenship, delaying court proceedings. His legal representative submitted that Feeney's renunciation was lodged, but was not registered by British authorities "[f]or some reason". On 1 February 2018, before any further court proceedings, Feeney announced his resignation from the House of Representatives, and confirmed that he had been unable to find documentation proving his renunciation of British citizenship.

On 23 February 2018, the Court held that Fenney had been ineligible to be elected by virtue of s.44(i) and that the vacancy is to be filled by a by-election. A by-election had already been called for 17 March 2018. Feeney did not re-contest the seat in the by-election, which was contested by Ged Kearney for the Labor party. Labor only narrowly won the suburban Melbourne electorate of Batman with Feeney in 2016, facing strong competition and losing the first-preference vote to the Greens' Alex Bhathal. The Greens announced on the same day as Feeney's resignation that Bhathal would run again in the Batman by-election. Kearney won the 2018 by-election with a 3.6% swing towards Labor, in the absence of a Liberal candidate.

=== Katy Gallagher ===
Labor Senator Katy Gallagher's mother was a British citizen born in Ecuador to British parents. Gallagher first entered Parliament on 25 March 2015, following a casual Senate vacancy for the Australian Capital Territory. She filed UK citizenship renunciation papers with the UK Home Office on 20 April 2016, in the lead-up to the federal election in 2016, which took place on 2 July. The UK Home Office accepted her payment as part of the application on 6 May; however, on 1 July, it requested original copies of her birth certificate and her parents' marriage certificate as part of her renunciation, which Gallagher provided on 20 July. The renunciation of her British citizenship was effective on 16 August 2016, after the federal election. On 6 December 2017, at Gallagher's request the Senate referred her case to the High Court.

The Senate referred Gallagher's case to the High Court as the Court of Disputed Returns. Her case was considered along with Feeney's during a directions hearing on 19 January 2018. The Attorney-General argued that Gallagher had not taken all reasonable steps to renounce her citizenship. On 9 May 2018, the Court unanimously found Gallagher to have been ineligible. Her disqualification triggered resignations of four other MPs in similar situations, who also attempted to renounce their British citizenships before the election, but were still effectively British citizens at the date of nominations. She was replaced by union official David Smith on 23 May 2018.

Gallagher's declaration that she did not hold foreign citizenship when the Australian Capital Territory Legislative Assembly nominated her to a casual vacancy in the Senate in 2015 prompted an Assembly inquiry into its Senate nomination processes, announced on 30 November 2017.

=== Justine Keay ===
Labor MP Justine Keay was born in Australia with British citizenship. She had been preselected by the Labor Party in 2015, but completed the UK Home Office's citizenship renunciation form on 9 May 2016, the day when the Parliament was dissolved for the 2016 federal election. The form was received by the Home Office on 31 May. Nominations for the election closed on 9 June and the election took place on 2 July. She received the British government's declaration of the renunciation on 8 July and the renunciation was registered on 11 July.

A legal opinion by David Bennett QC, a former Commonwealth Solicitor-General, commissioned by the Liberal Party, is that Keay, along with Susan Lamb and Rebekha Sharkie, were ineligible under the High Court ruling because they were British citizens at nomination date. Keay claims that she had taken "all reasonable steps" for renunciation. After Gallagher was disqualified, Keay announced her resignation, triggering a by-election in Braddon.

=== Susan Lamb ===
Labor MP Susan Lamb, born in Australia, had received advice that she may be a British citizen by descent through her late father. On 23 May 2016, two weeks before close of nominations for the 2016 federal election, she filed a renunciation form with the UK Home Office. However, Lamb's renunciation form was refused by UK authorities as they were not satisfied that she was in fact a British citizen, and instead requested further documents as proof. Lamb claimed to have fulfilled all the requirements of section 44(i) as she believed she had taken all reasonable steps to renounce her citizenship – if it were the case that she was a British citizen – as she was unable to provide any further documents; she said she was estranged from her mother and that her father had died. After Gallagher was disqualified, Lamb announced her resignation, triggering a by-election in Longman.

=== Rebekha Sharkie ===
NXT MP Rebekha Sharkie stated in July 2017 that she had renounced her UK citizenship prior to the election. She began the process to renounce her British citizenship on 19 April 2016, before the close of nominations, but the renunciation had not been registered by UK Home Office until 29 June, 20 days after nominations closed, although prior to the election.

Sharkie said that in November 2017 Turnbull had advised her that a reference to the High Court might be required in relation to her possible dual-citizenship status at the close of nominations. She argues that she has taken "all steps that were required by the UK to renounce any entitlement to UK citizenship, that were within my power to do so". It has also been suggested that she may be a citizen of the United States. After Gallagher was disqualified, Sharkie announced her resignation, triggering a by-election in Mayo.

=== Josh Wilson ===
Labor MP Josh Wilson applied to renounce his British citizenship on 13 May 2016, the day after his unexpected endorsement as a candidate for the 2016 election, nominations for which closed on 9 June. The renunciation was registered and effective on 24 June. After Gallagher was disqualified, Wilson announced his resignation, triggering a by-election in Fremantle.

== Other MPs and Senators whose status is to be determined ==
In response to the revelations, concerns have been raised regarding the citizenship status of a number of other MPs and Senators.

=== Greek citizenship concerns ===
It has been suggested that three Liberal parliamentarians—Julia Banks MP, Alex Hawke MP, and Senator Arthur Sinodinos—could hold Greek citizenship by descent from a Greek parent or parents. Both Greece and Australia permit dual citizenship. However, all three have entered on the Citizenship Register statements from the Greek Embassy that, since their births were not registered in Greece, they are not Greek citizens; they also refer to legal advice that they are not Greek citizens nor entitled to the rights or privileges of Greek citizenship.

=== Other foreign allegiance concerns ===
Katy Gallagher has also faced suggestions from The Daily Telegraph that she may be an Ecuadorian citizen, due to the 2008 Ecuadorian constitution which established the right of citizenship for anyone born in Ecuador, as well as their descendants even if born abroad. Gallagher has stated that the change in law in 2008 had no effect on her, as the change does not apply retroactively to the time of her mother's birth. The ALP has said it has obtained advice from an Ecuadorian legal expert and an Australian constitutional lawyer which advised Gallagher is not an Ecuadorian citizen. Because she has been found ineligible on the ground of her British citizenship at the time of nomination, although she has since renounced it, the question of Ecuadorian citizenship remains relevant only if she wishes to re-enter the Commonwealth Parliament.

On 2 November 2017, questions were raised by The Australian concerning the possibility that Liberal MP and Minister Josh Frydenberg could be a citizen of Hungary under a Hungarian law designed to prevent statelessness caused during World War II. The report claimed that the retrospective law provided that anyone who had been born within Hungary in the period 1941 to 1945 automatically became a Hungarian citizen, and citizenship in Hungary is passed down by birth right. As his mother was born in Hungary in 1943, an argument was raised that this meant Frydenberg held Hungarian citizenship. Frydenberg said that it was absurd to suggest he had involuntarily acquired Hungarian citizenship as, when his mother and other family members entered Australia in 1950, they were stateless survivors of the Holocaust. Prime Minister Turnbull and Attorney-General Brandis condemned the calls as witch hunts. Hungarian citizenship experts have since stated that such citizenship is not automatically conferred and can be restored only if the individual takes action that is "more than a formality".

On 11 November 2017, it was suggested that Liberal MP Nola Marino, Chief Government Whip in the House of Representatives, may be a citizen of Italy through marriage to an Italian citizen at a time when Italian law automatically conferred citizenship through marriage, unless her husband had renounced his Italian citizenship on becoming a naturalised Australian prior their marriage in Australia in 1972. Her husband was born in Italy in 1950, and came to Australia the next year. She might also be a citizen of the United States through her father, born in New York. She has denied being anything but an Australian, but has not provided details.

In his Citizenship Register entry, Senator Cory Bernardi states that his father and his father's parents were born in Italy. He adds that, when a child, he had asked an Italian consulate whether he was eligible for Italian citizenship and had been told that he was not, because at the time of his birth his father had been solely Australian; but no documentation of this is provided. Bernardi provides a copy of an application in 2006 to renounce Irish citizenship, which he later says he had acquired through marriage, but he has not provided a copy of a response to the application from Irish authorities.

Jason Falinski MP has stated a complex heritage, which he claims does not involve current foreign citizenship. However, his account has been questioned, with The Daily Telegraph reporting that documents from the National Archive of Australia show Falinski's paternal grandparents as being married a year prior to his father's birth – contradicting his statement in the Citizenship Register that his father was born out of wedlock. In response to these suggestions, Falinski said that his grandparents and father would have nonetheless lost their Polish citizenships per Polish law at the time upon emigrating to Australia even if this were the case.

It was suggested in May 2018 that Labor MP Anne Aly, born in Egypt, might still have Egyptian citizenship. She then obtained confirmation from the Egyptian embassy in Australia that she had forfeited her Egyptian citizenship upon acquiring Australian citizenship on 6 May 2016, two days before the federal election of 2016 was called.

=== Citizenship statements by other MPs and Senators ===
Prior to the implementation of the parliamentary Citizenship Register, several other MPs and Senators who were born outside Australia or are known to have at least one foreign-born parent have made statements clarifying that they were not dual citizens at the time of nominating as a candidate.

Among the highest-profile former British citizens were former prime minister Tony Abbott and incumbent opposition leader Bill Shorten, who released letters from UK Visas and Immigration and the UK Border Agency respectively to confirm that they renounced their British citizenship before being elected. British-born politicians who stated they had previously renounced their British citizenship included Labor MP Brian Mitchell, Greens Senator Nick McKim, Liberal MP Paul Fletcher, CLP Senator Nigel Scullion, and Greens Senator Jordon Steele-John. One Nation Senator Pauline Hanson and Liberal MP Ann Sudmalis denied claims that they were British citizens by descent.

Parliamentarians who were born overseas or descended from foreign nationals made similar statements, including those who were accused of being citizens of: Italy (Greens Senator Richard Di Natale and Labor MP Tony Zappia); Singapore (Liberal MP Ian Goodenough and Greens Senator Peter Whish-Wilson); Belgium (Liberal frontbencher Mathias Cormann); Greece (Labor MP Maria Vamvakinou); Iran (Labor Senator Sam Dastyari); Malaysia (Labor frontbencher Penny Wong); New Zealand (Senator Rex Patrick); Slovenia (Labor's Deputy Opposition Leader Tanya Plibersek); and the United States (NXT MP Rebekha Sharkie). Senator Derryn Hinch did confirm that he is entitled to a pension through US Social Security, but stated on 2 September 2017 that he would not seek a reference since the Attorney-General had advised him that he was not in breach.

== Other Section 44 concerns ==
=== Section 44(iv) ===
==== Andrew Bartlett ====
In November 2017, Andrew Bartlett replaced Greens Senator Larissa Waters after a recount. At the time of nomination, Bartlett had been an academic employed by the Australian National University. He claimed to have legal advice that this did not disqualify him under section 44(iv) and his eligibility was not challenged at the same time as that of Hughes. Nonetheless, the Commonwealth Solicitor-General suggested that the Senate might need to refer his position to the High Court and the Greens were reported to be seeking further legal advice. However, Bartlett resigned from the Senate in August 2018, to allow Waters to return.

=== Section 44(v) ===
==== David Gillespie ====
A court challenge against Nationals MP and junior minister David Gillespie, was heard by the Full High Court on 12 December 2017, alleging a breach of the "pecuniary interest" requirement in section 44(v) of the Constitution; the Full High Court considered section 44(v) in April 2017 when finding that Senator Bob Day had been ineligible for election. The Opposition Australian Labor Party and some community groups believe that Gillespie has an indirect financial relationship with the federal government, in that he owns a suburban shopping complex in Port Macquarie with an Australia Post licensee.

The action against Gillespie was brought by former Labor candidate for Lyne, Peter Alley, under s 3 of the Common Informers (Parliamentary Disqualifications) Act 1975. The Act "otherwise provides" following section 46 of the Constitution: under the Act (which appears not to have been used before), a member of the federal Parliament who is sitting while disqualified is liable, to anybody who may sue for it in the High Court, for $200 per day of so sitting, following initiation of the action and for up to 12 months previously. During pre-trial proceedings, a question arose as to whether a common informer action can be brought against a member of parliament without a prior finding of disqualification by the Court of Disputed Returns or the relevant House of Parliament. This question was referred by Bell J to a Full Court of the High Court, with a hearing to be held on 12 December 2017. Alley was represented by leading barrister Bret Walker SC. On 21 March 2018 the High Court stated that it could not hear the case against Gillespie because it was not a reference from Parliament.

==== Barry O'Sullivan ====
The media speculated that Queensland Liberal National Senator Barry O'Sullivan may have had pecuniary interests in breach of section 44(v). In the Senate on 13 November 2017, Queensland ALP Senator Murray Watt accused O'Sullivan of three breaches of section 44(v); O'Sullivan was present but did not respond.

== New Zealand political row ==
A row ensued between the Australian Government and the New Zealand Labour Party after it was reported that a staff member for an Australian Labor senator had asked a New Zealand MP, Chris Hipkins, to find out whether or not Barnaby Joyce (then Deputy Prime Minister of Australia) was a citizen of that country. Australian Foreign Minister Julie Bishop accused New Zealand's Labour Party of being "involved in allegations designed to undermine the government of Australia" and Australian Prime Minister Malcolm Turnbull accused the Australian Labor Party of conspiring "with a foreign power". Bishop added that she would find it "very hard to build trust" with the New Zealand Labour Party if it formed government after that country's general election. Bishop's claim of collusion was rejected by the New Zealand Minister of Internal Affairs, Peter Dunne, as well as the New Zealand Labour Leader, Jacinda Ardern, although Ardern had initially criticised Hipkins' involvement.

Following the election of the Sixth Labour Government of New Zealand, Bishop said that she looked forward to working with Prime Minister Ardern.

== Implications for parliamentary majority ==
At the 2016 federal election, the Coalition Government retained power with 76 of 150 seats, a one-seat majority. Before it was clear that the Coalition would win a majority of seats, Katter's Australian Party MP Bob Katter, independent Andrew Wilkie and independent Cathy McGowan guaranteed confidence and supply in the event of a hung parliament.

On 15 August 2017, Bob Katter announced that, in the event that Joyce's seat was declared vacant, he could not assure that he would support the Turnbull government on confidence and supply; he stated that Turnbull would be "back to the drawing board" for his support. Additionally, Rebekha Sharkie, the sole MP in the House of Representatives for the Nick Xenophon Team, announced on 18 August that she would no longer support the Government on matters of confidence and supply, although reversed that decision on 20 August. Cathy McGowan continued to agree to maintain confidence and supply for the Turnbull government. Andrew Wilkie stated that he "[would] not vote against budget supply or confidence unless doing so would be clearly warranted."

After Barnaby Joyce was found ineligible to sit in parliament, the government no longer had a majority of seats, but did have a majority of sitting members. With the resignation of John Alexander on 11 November, the government lost its majority in the lower house, being reduced to 74 out of 148 members. The majority was regained when Joyce won the New England by-election on 2 December.

== Historical eligibility queries ==
Two early twentieth century Australian politicians may not have been Australian citizens or (as then) British subjects:

- King O'Malley: claimed to have been born in Canada, but may have been born in the United States.
- Chris Watson: British mother and apparently a British father, but born on board a ship in Chilean waters to a Chilean father.

== See also ==
- The natural-born-citizen clause in the United States Constitution, which has also been contested.
