= Re Canavan =

Australian 2017 court cases on citizenship eligibility for Australian politicians

Re Canavan; Re Ludlam; Re Waters; Re Roberts [No 2]; Re Joyce; Re Nash; Re Xenophon
- Court: High Court of Australia as the Court of Disputed Returns
- Full case name: In the Matter of Questions Referred to the Court of Disputed Returns Pursuant to Section 376 of the Commonwealth Electoral Act 1918 (Cth) Concerning Senator the Hon Matthew Canavan; Mr Scott Ludlam; Ms Larissa Waters; Senator Malcolm Roberts; The Hon Barnaby Joyce MP; Senator the Hon Fiona Nash; Senator Nick Xenophon
- Argued: 10-12 October 2017
- Decided: 27 October 2017
- Citations: [2017] HCA 45, (2017) 263 CLR 284
- Transcripts: 10 Oct [2017] HCATrans 199; Audio-visual recording; 11 Oct [2017] HCATrans 200; Audio-visual recording; 12 Oct [2017] HCATrans 201; Audio-visual recording

Case history
- Prior action: Re Roberts [2017] HCA 39
- Subsequent action: Re Nash [No 2] [2017] HCA 52

Court membership
- Judges sitting: Kiefel CJ, Bell, Gageler, Keane, Nettle, Gordon, Edelman JJ

Case opinions
- A person holding foreign citizenship, irrespective of whether they knew about their citizenship status, will be disqualified pursuant to s. 44(i) of the Constitution from being elected to Parliament unless they are irremediably prevented by foreign law from renouncing the foreign citizenship and have taken all steps that are reasonably required to renounce that foreign citizenship. (per curiam)

Keywords
- Constitutional imperative; Foreign citizenship; Naturalised; Voluntariness; Willful blindness

Re Canavan; Re Ludlam; Re Waters; Re Roberts [No 2]; Re Joyce; Re Nash; Re Xenophon (commonly referred to as the "Citizenship Seven case") is a set of cases, heard together by the High Court of Australia sitting as the Court of Disputed Returns, arising from doubts as to the eligibility of a number of members of Parliament to be elected to Parliament because of section 44(i) of the Constitution.

The Court unanimously held on 27 October 2017 that a dual citizen, irrespective of whether they knew about their citizenship status, will be disqualified from Parliament unless they are irremediably prevented by foreign law from renouncing the foreign citizenship and have taken all steps that are reasonably required to renounce that foreign citizenship; it identified a "constitutional imperative" that no Australian citizen should be irremediably excluded from participation in representative government.^{: paras 43-46, 72} The Court rejected arguments that would change the approach to section 44(i) of the Constitution, maintaining the approach of the majority in Sykes v Cleary.

== Background ==
Section 44 of the Constitution relevantly states:

44. Any person who -

(i.) Is under any acknowledgement of allegiance, obedience, or adherence to a foreign power, or is a subject or a citizen or entitled to the rights or privileges of a subject or citizen of a foreign power: ...

shall be incapable of being chosen or of sitting as a senator or a member of the House of Representatives.

In the first 80 years after federation, the only time a court had considered the meaning of this disqualification was in 1950, when the High Court rejected a claim that a Catholic was disqualified from sitting as the Pope was a foreign power. In 1976, a parliamentary committee considered dual nationality noting that citizenship may be acquired by birth, by descent and by grant, stating:

Rules governing nationality generally range from the automatic loss of a former nationality on acquisition of another, to making it impossible to surrender a former nationality. Some countries confer their citizenship on successive generations regardless of the country of birth. A consequence of this latter situation is that many Australians are unknowingly dual nationals and there is no way of determining with certainty who or how many are in this category.

In 1981, a Senate committee considered the meaning of 44(i), noting the above before stating that "In our view it is unlikely that a court would construe this provision as requiring a person to have voluntarily retained his formal allegiance to his previous country before he breaches s.44(i)" and recommended that the sub-section be removed and replaced by a new provision requiring Australian citizenship.

Section 44(i) was considered by the High Court in 1988, which held in Nile v Wood that it required an identified foreign power. Robert Wood was subsequently found to be invalidly elected because he was not an Australian citizen and the High Court declined to decide whether dual citizenship of Australia and the United Kingdom would disqualify a person. In 1992 the High Court held in Sykes v Cleary that a by-election for the Victorian seat of Wills was void. As part of the judgment the majority of the court held that a dual citizen was disqualified by section 44(i) unless they had “taken reasonable steps” to renounce their other citizenship. The consequence of dual citizenship of Australia and the United Kingdom was resolved in the 1999 decision in Sue v Hill where the High Court held that the United Kingdom was by then a foreign power and Heather Hill was therefore disqualified.

== Facts ==
During 2017, there arose seven instances of a possible breach of section 44(i), when over the course of several months, media revealed that seven federal parliamentarians appeared to be dual citizens. Two of these, Australian Greens Senators Scott Ludlam and Larissa Waters, resigned from Parliament shortly afterwards. Together with four other Senators and one member of the House of Representatives—Liberal National Party Senator Matt Canavan, One Nation Senator Malcolm Roberts, Deputy Prime Minister and Nationals leader Barnaby Joyce MP, Deputy leader of the Nationals and Senator Fiona Nash, and Nick Xenophon Team leader and Senator Nick Xenophon—their cases were referred to the High Court, as the Court of Disputed Returns.

On 18 August, the Labor Opposition proposed to the Prime Minister that the challenged ministers who had not stepped aside from their position should do so due to Section 64 of the Constitution of Australia, which requires that nobody can serve as a minister for more than three months unless they are a member of the parliament; ministerial decisions taken by somebody who was not validly occupying ministerial office would themselves be invalid. While Matthew Canavan had already resigned from his positions of Minister for Resources and Northern Australia in the Cabinet prior to Labor's proposition, the other two Cabinet ministers, Barnaby Joyce and Fiona Nash, chose to remain in their positions until the court handed down its decision.

=== Matt Canavan ===
Matt Canavan has been a Liberal National Party senator for Queensland from 1 July 2014. He had been a Minister since 18 February 2016. On 25 July 2017, Canavan resigned from his positions of Minister for Resources and Northern Australia over doubts as to his eligibility to be a member of the parliament, after discovering that he was considered by the Italian authorities to be a citizen of Italy. Canavan's mother had registered him as an Italian resident abroad with the Italian consulate in Brisbane in 2006. Canavan stated he was unaware of this until his mother was prompted to inform him following news of the resignation of two Greens senators holding dual citizenship. The government took the view that he was not in breach of the Constitution as the registration was not made with Canavan's knowledge or consent.

As of 24 August, Canavan accepted that, owing to a change in Italian law in 1983, he had been an Italian citizen since he was two years old. However, the Court was told that Italian experts were uncertain of the effect of that change: one view was that it conferred citizenship automatically, the other that it only conferred eligibility to "activate" citizenship. On the latter view, which Canavan's counsel proposed be preferred, Canavan had never been an Italian citizen.

=== Barnaby Joyce ===
Barnaby Joyce was the National Party member of the House of Representatives for the seat of New England, New South Wales from 7 September 2013. Prior to that, he was a senator for Queensland from 1 July 2005. He had been a Minister since 18 September 2013, and Deputy Prime Minister since 18 February 2016. On 14 August 2017, Joyce announced that the New Zealand government had informed him that he might be a citizen of New Zealand by descent from his father and said that he was "shocked to receive this information". He did not resign from his ministerial offices and continued to vote in Parliament.

=== Scott Ludlam ===
Scott Ludlam was a Greens senator for Western Australia from 1 July 2008. On 14 July 2017, Ludlam announced that he was resigning from the Senate as he still retained New Zealand citizenship from his birth in New Zealand. Ludlam with his family had settled in Australia aged eight, and had previously assumed he lost his New Zealand citizenship when he was naturalised as an Australian citizen in his mid-teens.

=== Fiona Nash ===
Fiona Nash was a National Party senator for New South Wales from 1 July 2005. She had been a Minister since 21 September 2015 and deputy leader of the Nationals since 11 February 2016. Three days after the announcement from Nationals leader Joyce, on 17 August 2017, Nash revealed that she had British citizenship by descent through her Scottish father. She elected not to step down from leadership or cabinet while she was referred to the High Court.

=== Larissa Waters ===
Larissa Waters was a Greens senator for Queensland from 1 July 2011. The revelation of Ludlam's dual citizenship prompted Waters, Ludlam's fellow co-deputy leader of the Greens, to similarly check whether she held Canadian citizenship. On discovering that she did, she resigned four days after Ludlam. Waters was born to Australian parents who briefly lived in Canada, and returned with them to Australia while still a baby. She had previously believed that she was solely an Australian citizen and that if she would have needed to take active steps before age 21 if she wished to gain Canadian citizenship. However, she discovered she had in fact held dual citizenship since birth.

=== Malcolm Roberts ===
Malcolm Roberts was a One Nation senator for Queensland from 2 July 2016. He was born in India of an Australian mother and a British father. Roberts is an Australian citizen, and in August 2017 documents revealed by BuzzFeed indicated that Roberts was a British citizen at the age of 19. Roberts stated that he had only ever been an Australian and that, in case he ever had British citizenship, before the 2016 election he had taken reasonable steps to renounce it. Doubts were cast upon his view of the position. He could have also been an Indian citizen, however this appears to have been discounted on the basis that there was an automatic loss of Indian citizenship on acquisition of another.

There were factual issues in relation to Roberts' state of mind and knowledge and Justice Patrick Keane was assigned to determine the facts to be considered by the full court. Roberts and his sister Barbara were cross examined, as well as two expert witnesses on British citizenship. The following day, Keane handed down his decision on that evidence, finding that at the date of his nomination for the Senate (1) Roberts was a British citizen, (2) he knew that there was at least a real and substantial prospect that he was a British citizen and (3) Roberts could have, but didn't, take steps to renounce his British citizenship.

=== Nick Xenophon ===
Nick Xenophon had been the Nick Xenophon Team senator for South Australia since 1 July 2008. In August 2017, he was asked whether he might have acquired Greek citizenship through his mother, born in Greece, and British or Cypriot nationality through his father, an ethnic Greek who was born in Cyprus when it was a British colony and who possessed a British passport. Xenophon stated: "I've never had, never sought, never received citizenship of another country but out of an abundance of caution I wrote to the Greek embassy and Cypriot high commission saying essentially, 'I've never been a citizen, I don't want to be, so if there's any question that I could be, I renounce any rights to be'. I don't know what else I can do in the circumstances." He added that he had not received replies to these enquiries. Later he said that he had renounced Greek citizenship but, on finding that he might be British, he had sought clarification from British authorities. On 19 August, he announced that British authorities had confirmed that he is a British Overseas citizen, a lesser form of British nationality. He stated that he would not resign from the Parliament, but would await a High Court decision. On 6 October 2017, he announced his intention to resign from the Senate in order to stand for the Parliament of South Australia at the South Australian general election due in March 2018.

== Arguments ==
The High Court heard submissions from 10 to 12 October 2017 from the Solicitor-General of Australia, Stephen Donaghue, legal representatives of the seven parliamentarians involved, Tony Windsor in the Joyce matter, and an amicus curiae appointed to assist the Court.

== Judgment ==
On 27 October 2017, the High Court handed down its decision. In a unanimous judgment, the Court interpreted s 44(i) according to the "ordinary and natural meaning" of its language. On that approach, it first affirmed the view taken in Sykes v Cleary that the question of eligibility is to be determined with reference to the point of nomination. The Court then followed the reasoning of the majority in Sykes v Cleary. The Court said in part (emphases added):

A person who, at the time that he or she nominates for election, retains the status of subject or citizen of a foreign power will be disqualified by reason of s 44(i), except where the operation of the foreign law is contrary to the constitutional imperative that an Australian citizen not be irremediably prevented by foreign law from participation in representative government. Where it can be demonstrated that the person has taken all steps that are reasonably required by the foreign law to renounce his or her citizenship and within his or her power, the constitutional imperative is engaged.

The Court ruled that the fact of citizenship was disqualifying, regardless of whether the person knew of the citizenship or engaged in any voluntary act of acquisition. It emphasised that to hold otherwise would introduce an element of subjectivity that "would be inimical to the stability of representative government". It followed that each of Joyce, Ludlam, Nash, Roberts and Waters had been ineligible to be elected.

However, Canavan and Xenophon had been eligible. It was determined that Canavan, under Italian law, was not a citizen of Italy. It was found that Xenophon was a British Overseas citizen, but that this did not give him the right to enter or reside in the United Kingdom; therefore, for the purposes of s 44(i), he was neither a citizen nor entitled to the rights and privileges of a citizen of the United Kingdom. The Court declared the seats of the ineligible members to be vacant, It ordered that the vacancy in the House of Representatives be filled through a by-election and that the vacancies in the Senate be filled by "special counts" (i.e., countbacks) of the ballot papers in each State, subject to supervision by a Justice of the Court.

At an earlier directions hearing, the Chief Justice had approved the Commonwealth's undertaking to pay the legal costs of all the parties and of Tony Windsor (intervening in the Joyce case).

== Subsequent developments ==
According to some legal opinions, more than 100 Turnbull government decisions are vulnerable to legal challenge as a result of Joyce and Nash being ineligible to be in Parliament, and consequently to be Ministers, with lawyers concluding there is a high likelihood that the work the pair had done over the previous year could end up before the courts, because of section 64 of the constitution, which requires Ministers to be members of Parliament. The court could decide, however, that the decisions are valid because they were made by a person who was "clothed with the authority of an office".

The disqualified senators and members had collected over $9 million in base salary, ministerial bonuses and other allowances over the period that they were ineligible to sit, in addition to superannuation payments, other entitlements and staff payments. The government could demand repayment of such amounts or it could waive repayment. The Commonwealth undertook to pay the legal costs of the all the parties and of Tony Windsor (intervening in the Joyce case). The High Court's decision immediately disqualified Joyce, Nash and Roberts from Parliament. Ludlam and Waters had already resigned. Xenophon, who was found eligible had, whilst the case was before the High Court, resigned from the Senate to run for the South Australian Parliament. Two of the ousted MPs – Joyce and Nash – were members of Cabinet, requiring a rearrangement of the Second Turnbull Ministry, which took place on the same day. Canavan, who had stepped down from Cabinet pending the court's decision, was returned to Cabinet.

Replacements of three of the four disqualified Senators were announced on 10 November. Ludlam was replaced by Jordan Steele-John; Waters by Andrew Bartlett and Roberts by Fraser Anning.

A by-election in Joyce's former seat of New England was held on 2 December, with Joyce being re-elected.

Following the High Court's decision, three more Senators and an MP resigned as a result of holding citizenship of the United Kingdom: Stephen Parry, Jacqui Lambie, and Skye Kakoschke-Moore. John Alexander resigned from the seat of Bennelong in the House of Representatives and was re-elected at the subsequent by-election.

The candidate determined by the special count to replace Nash, Hollie Hughes, was found by the High Court in Re Nash [No 2] to be ineligible under s. 44(iv) of the Constitution because subsequent to the election but before the special count she held an "office of profit under the Crown" as a part-time member of the Administrative Appeals Tribunal. A further special count determined that Jim Molan would replace Nash, and on 22 December 2017 the High Court declared him elected to Nash's seat.

Both houses of Parliament subsequently introduced a process for all members to provide documentation about their citizenship status and published all of the material provided. As a result of that process, Senator Katy Gallagher and MP David Feeney were referred to the High Court as a result of holding dual citizenship at the time of the 2016 election.
