= 2017 New England by-election =

Australian federal by-election

← 2016	2 December 2017	2019 →

The Division of New England (NSW) in the House of Representatives
- Registered: 110,685
- Turnout: 87.05% ▼6.14
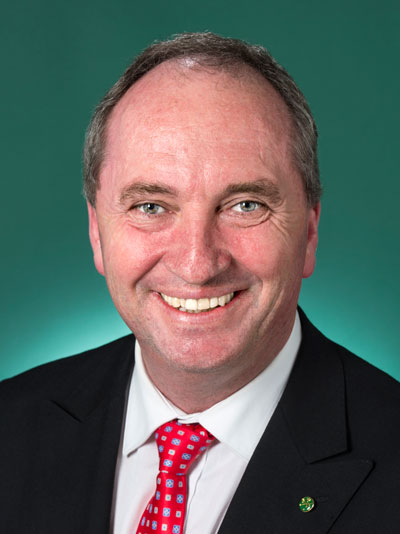

	First party	Second party
Candidate	Barnaby Joyce	David Ewings
Party	National	Labor
Popular vote	57,016	9,764
Percentage	64.92%	11.12%
Swing	▲12.63	▲4.11
TPP	73.63%	26.37%
TPP swing	▲7.21	▼7.21
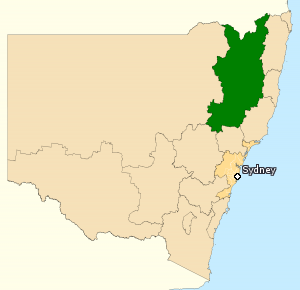
- The Division of New England covers 66,394 km² in northern rural New South Wales. From south to north it includes the regional population centres of Scone, Tamworth, Armidale, Glen Innes, Inverell and Tenterfield.
MP before election
Barnaby Joyce
National
Elected MP
Barnaby Joyce
National

A by-election for the Australian House of Representatives seat of New England was held on 2 December 2017.

Previous incumbent Barnaby Joyce, serving as Deputy Prime Minister and Nationals leader from February 2016 until October 2017 when his seat of New England was declared vacant, won the by-election with a large primary and two-party swing.

== Background ==
Amid the 2017–18 Australian parliamentary eligibility crisis, the trigger for the by-election was the judgment of the High Court of Australia sitting as the Court of Disputed Returns on 27 October 2017, which found that the sitting member, Deputy Prime Minister and Nationals leader Barnaby Joyce, was ineligible under Section 44 of the Constitution to sit in the Parliament of Australia, by virtue of holding New Zealand citizenship at the time of his nomination and election. The seat was declared vacant by the High Court on the same day. Joyce had renounced his dual citizenship effective from August in order to become a sole citizen of Australia, and was thus eligible to run for the by-election.

Speaker of the House of Representatives Tony Smith issued the writ for the election on 27 October 2017, the same day as the High Court's judgment.

== Key dates ==
- Friday 27 October 2017 – Previous election ruled void
- Friday 27 October 2017 – Issue of writ
- Friday 3 November 2017 – Close of electoral rolls (8pm)
- Thursday 9 November 2017 – Close of nominations (12 noon)
- Friday 10 November 2017 – Declaration of nominations (12 noon)
- Tuesday 14 November 2017 – Start of early voting
- Saturday 2 December 2017 – Polling day (8am to 6pm)
- Friday 15 December 2017 – Last day for receipt of postal votes
- Sunday 4 February 2018 – Last day for return of writ

As at least 33 days must elapse between the issue of a writ and the date of a by-election, the earliest Saturday that the by-election could take place was on 2 December.

== Candidates ==
Former independent member for New England Tony Windsor, who retired at the 2013 election before unsuccessfully contesting the seat at the 2016 election with a 29.2 percent primary vote, announced he would not be nominating as a candidate in the by-election. Pauline Hanson's One Nation and Shooters, Fishers and Farmers also announced that they would not run.

17 candidates in ballot paper order
Party	Candidate	Background
Christian Democrats	Richard Stretton	Self-employed plant mechanic and perennial candidate.
Animal Justice	Skyla Wagstaff	Environmental and animal rights activist.
Affordable Housing	Andrew Potts	Former Sydney Star Observer contributor and party founder.
Independent	Jeff Madden	Single father, part-time truck driver and traffic controller.
Liberal Democrat	Tristam Smyth	Cardiologist based in Tamworth.
Independent	Dean Carter	Tamworth resident.
National	Barnaby Joyce	New England MP 2013–2017, Nationals leader and Deputy Prime Minister 2016–2017.
#Sustainable	William Bourke	Party founder and perennial candidate.
Seniors United	Warwick Stacey	Former business owner and Army Reservist.
Independent	Rob Taber	Independent Bennelong candidate in 2016. New England Solar Owner and Jobs Australia Chairman.
CountryMinded	Pete Mailler	Local cattle and grain farmer, CountryMinded co-founder. Queensland Senate candidate in 2016.
Labor	David Ewings	Local coal miner and Australian Defence Force personnel. Labor's New England candidate in 2016.
Rise Up	Donald Cranney	Farmer based in south-central Queensland.
Greens	Peter Wills	Quirindi farmer and Liverpool Plains Alliance campaigner.
21st Century	Jamie McIntyre	Entrepreneur, banned from corporate directorships for 10 years by for property spruiking
Science	Meow-Ludo Meow-Meow	Adviser to nutritional infant formula startup company and bio-hacker.
Country	Ian Britza	Former Liberal member of the Western Australian Legislative Assembly.

== Results ==
2017 New England by-election
Party	Candidate	Votes	%	±%
National	Barnaby Joyce	57,016	64.92	+12.63
Labor	David Ewings	9,764	11.12	+4.11
Independent	Rob Taber	5,959	6.79	+3.99
Greens	Peter Wills	3,824	4.35	+1.43
Christian Democrats	Richard Stretton	2,129	2.42	+1.03
CountryMinded	Pete Mailler	2,112	2.40	+0.99
Science	Meow-Ludo Meow-Meow	1,183	1.35	+1.35
Independent	Jeff Madden	1,145	1.30	+1.30
Animal Justice	Skyla Wagstaff	930	1.06	+1.06
Sustainable Australia	William Bourke	628	0.72	+0.72
Affordable Housing	Andrew Potts	605	0.69	+0.69
Independent	Dean Carter	590	0.67	+0.67
Liberal Democrats	Tristam Smyth	515	0.59	−0.62
Country	Ian Britza	494	0.56	+0.56
Rise Up Australia	Donald Cranney	365	0.42	+0.42
Seniors United	Warwick Stacey	342	0.39	+0.39
21st Century	Jamie McIntyre	222	0.25	+0.25
Total formal votes		87,823	91.06	−1.90
Informal votes		8,618	8.94	+1.90
Turnout		96,441	87.13	−6.14
Two-party-preferred result
National	Barnaby Joyce	64,664	73.63	+7.21
Labor	David Ewings	23,159	26.37	−7.21
National hold		Swing	+7.21	

Early in the evening, ABC election analyst Antony Green predicted an easy victory for Joyce. Claiming victory that evening, Joyce picked up a large primary and two-party swing.

== See also ==
- List of Australian federal by-elections
