= Alley v Gillespie =

Judgement of the High Court of Australia

- Court: High Court of Australia
- Full case name: Peter Alley v Dr David Gillespie
- Argued: 12 December 2017
- Decided: 21 March 2018
- Citation: [2018] HCA 11
- Transcripts: 23 August 2017 [2017] HCATrans 168; 27 September 2017 [2017] HCATrans 193; 29 September 2017 [2017] HCATrans 196; 12 December 2017 [2017] HCATrans 257

Case opinions
- 7:0 (separate judgments by Nettle, Gordon and Gageler JJ) that liability under the Common Informers (Parliamentary Disqualifications) Act 1975 (Cth) must be determined by the House of Parliament in which the question arises or by the Court of Disputed Returns hearing a reference pursuant to the Commonwealth Electoral Act 1918 (Cth)

Alley v Gillespie, was a significant decision of the High Court of Australia that considered the purpose and scope of s 46 of the Australian Constitution. It was the first application brought under the Common Informers (Parliamentary Disqualifications) Act 1975 (Cth) ('Common Informers Act').

== Section 46 and the Common Informers Act ==
Section 46 of the Constitution provides:

Until the Parliament otherwise provides, any person declared by this Constitution to be incapable of sitting as a senator or as a member of the House of Representatives shall, for every day on which he so sits, be liable to pay the sum of one hundred pounds to any person who sues for it in any court of competent jurisdiction.

In 1975 the Parliament of Australia "otherwise provided" by enacting the Common Informers Act which reduced the penalty claimable to $200 for every ineligible day sat prior to the commencement of the proceeding, and a further $200 for each day on which the High Court finds the person had sat while ineligible. The Common Informers Act was introduced hastily through the House of Representatives after questions arose over the eligibility of Senator James Webster relating to his share ownership in a family company, J.J. Webster Pty Ltd which had entered an agreement with the Postmaster-General of the Commonwealth for the supply of timber to the Postmaster-General's Department. While the Court ultimately found that Senator Webster was eligible, the Common Informers Act was introduced for the purpose of limiting the possible penalty exposure of Senator Webster, which at the time was significant under the unamended s 46 (at a rate of £100 per day for sitting while disqualified). On introducing the Common Informers Act, the Hon. Kep Enderby, the Attorney-General, said:

The purpose of the provision is to allow alleged disqualifications to be independently tested. There is already another procedure for this and in normal circumstances it would seem to the Government that the House itself would refer the question to the High Court and have the matter properly judicially determined. One significant change that the Bill will make is that common informer proceedings, if brought, are to be brought in the High Court.

The High Court summarised the origins of common informer-style proceedings in their majority decision:

The origins of the common informer action lay in the need to provide incentives to citizens to put the processes of the law in train at a time when the State was weak and its laws not always enforced. English statutes gave common informers the right to bring a case to recover penalties for breaches of a wide range of laws including, by way of example, unlawful gaming, unlicensed disorderly houses, depositing of rubbish on the streets and throwing of fireworks.

== Background to the decision ==
In Re Day (No 2) the Court of Disputed Returns found that, since 26 February 2016 (although three judges were prepared to say 1 December 2015), Day had had an "indirect pecuniary interest" in an agreement with the Commonwealth, and thus was in violation of section 44(v), by reason of his interest in a rental agreement over his electoral office. The decision, which overturned the 1975 reading of s 44(v) by Barwick CJ in Re Webster (1975) 132 CLR 270, was widely considered to have significantly broadened the scope of s 44(v) of the Constitution.

On 7 July 2017 Peter Alley, the former Labor candidate for the 2016 federal election for the electorate of Lyne, filed a writ of summons in the High Court of Australia seeking the imposition of a penalty under the Common Informers Act against Dr David Gillespie for sitting while disqualified. In the proceeding Mr Alley alleged that Dr Gillespie, by reason of him owning a shopping centre in which a tenant was a licensee of Australia Post (a government owned corporation), was in breach of s 44(v) of the Constitution. Section 44(v), an anti-corruption provision, prevents members of parliament from holding a "direct or indirect pecuniary interest with the Public Service of the Commonwealth".

In the course of the proceeding, a question arose as to whether the High Court, not sitting as the Court of Disputed Returns, could order a penalty without a prior finding by the House in which the member of parliament resided or by the Court of Disputed Returns determining a referral of the House. At a directions hearing on 29 September 2017 Bell J ordered that the question be referred to the Full Court for determination.

== Judgment ==
The proceeding was stayed pending the determination of liability by the House of Representatives or a referral to the Court of Disputed Returns. Three judgments were delivered: the majority judgment of Kiefel CJ, Bell, Edelman and Keane JJ, and two separate judgments by Gageler J and Gordon and Nettle JJ. At [51] and [52] the majority said:

Whilst the question posed by these words in s 46 is one necessary to be determined before a person is liable to the imposition of a penalty, it is not necessary that the answer to that question be determined by the court hearing a common informer action. Indeed, there may be good reason to conclude that the question should not be determined in that proceeding, given that the same question is to be dealt with under s 47 and that it may be part only of the overlapping questions which may there arise.

Ultimately, the majority determined (at [67]):

Properly understood, the place of s 46 in the scheme of Ch I Pt IV is to allow for the imposition and recovery of a penalty in a common informer action. It is the role of the Court to determine the quantum of the penalty under the Common Informers Act. It may do so when the anterior question of liability is determined by the means provided by s 47.

Gageler J, writing separately, rejected the ‘alternative view’ (see [75]–[77]) and noted that the Parliament had otherwise provided for the purpose of s 47 by a law enacted under s 76(i) and (ii), namely pt XXII of the Electoral Act 1918 (Cth) (at [78]). The jurisdiction conferred by s 5 of the Common Informers Act was ‘circumscribed to the extent of the continuing exclusive operation of s 47’ (at [79]), and the s 3 requirements of the Act could only be determined by the Senate or House or the Court of Disputed Returns acting pursuant to a referral (at [80]). Gageler J's primary consideration was the 'coherence' of the scheme provided for by ss 46, 47, 76 and 77 of the Constitution (at [70]). In particular, he noted that s 46 merely creates a cause of action and s 47 was 'squarely addressed to authority to decide and to nothing other than authority to decide' (at [71] and [72]). He said of the alternative arguments (at [75]):

The alternative view of the relationship between ss 46 and 47 is not without precedent. It was the view to which Gaudron J was persuaded in Sue v Hill. It was presaged by Professor Enid Campbell in an opinion prepared for the Royal Commission on Australian Government Administration in 1976. Professor Campbell called in aid what she fairly described in that opinion as "dictum in the English case of Bradlaugh v Gossett which suggests that the court trying the suit for penalties would not be bound by the House's adjudication". The same dictum was noted in the edition of Erskine May's well-known treatise on parliamentary practice current at the time of federation as one of a number of "conflicting opinions as to the limits of parliamentary privilege, and the jurisdiction of courts of law".

Gordon and Nettle JJ said of the powers in s 47 (at [104]):

Section 46 does not expressly or by necessary implication empower the Parliament to provide for means of determining any question concerning the qualification of a senator or member of the House of Representatives. Section 47 does. That difference, and the considerations mentioned in what follows, signify that the determination of who is disqualified is left to the processes fixed under s 47.

The court made no finding as to the eligibility of Dr Gillespie.
