= Fiona Nash =

Australian politician (born 1965)

The Honourable Fiona Nash
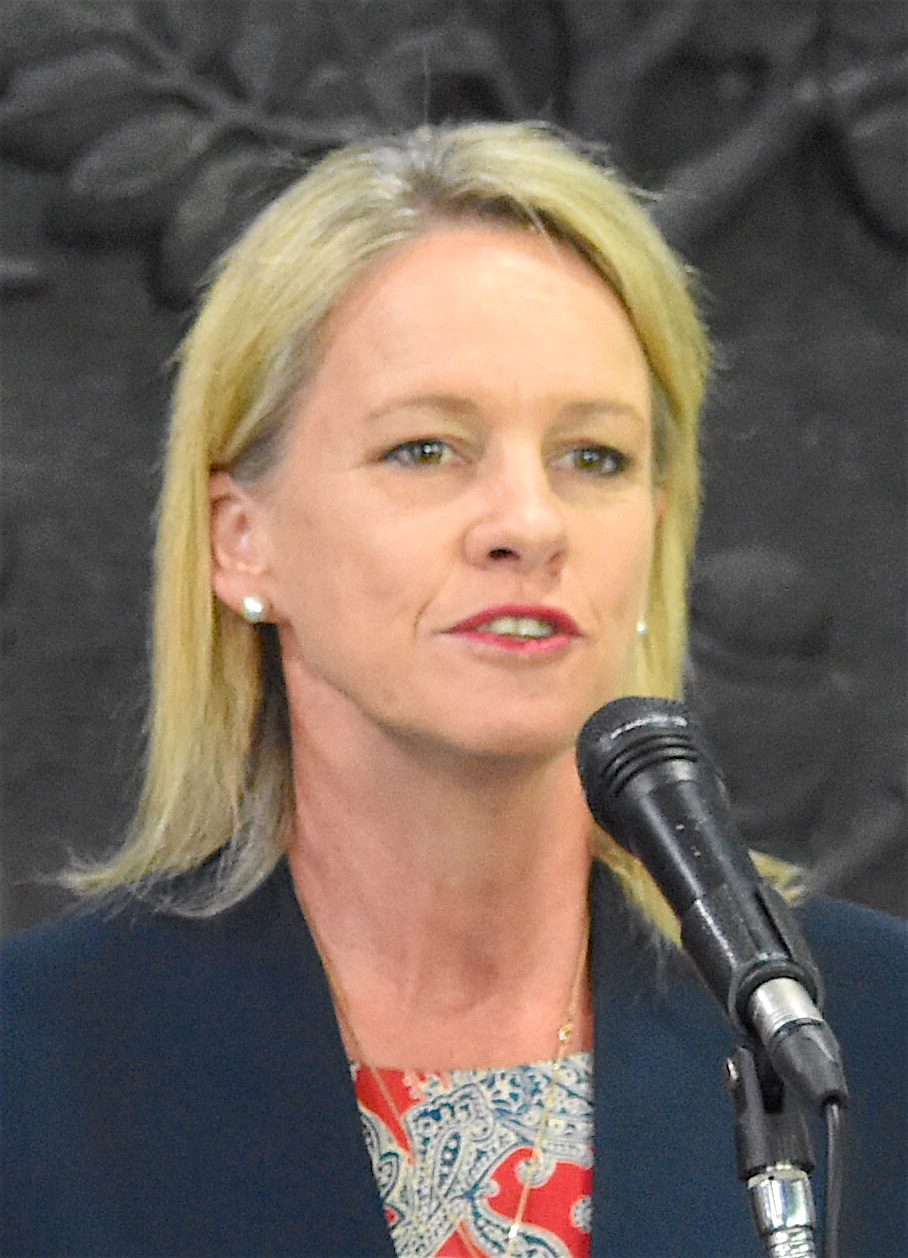
- Nash in 2017

Deputy Leader of the National Party
- In office 11 February 2016 – 7 December 2017
- Leader: Barnaby Joyce
- Preceded by: Barnaby Joyce
- Succeeded by: Bridget McKenzie

Minister for Local Government and Territories
- In office 19 July 2016 – 27 October 2017
- Prime Minister: Malcolm Turnbull
- Preceded by: Paul Fletcher (as Minister for Territories, Local Government and Major Projects)
- Succeeded by: Darren Chester

Minister for Regional Development
- In office 18 February 2016 – 27 October 2017
- Prime Minister: Malcolm Turnbull
- Preceded by: Warren Truss (as Minister for Infrastructure and Regional Development)
- Succeeded by: Darren Chester

Minister for Regional Communications
- In office 18 February 2016 – 27 October 2017
- Prime Minister: Malcolm Turnbull
- Preceded by: Sharon Bird (2013)
- Succeeded by: Bridget McKenzie

Minister for Rural Health
- In office 21 September 2015 – 19 July 2016
- Prime Minister: Malcolm Turnbull
- Preceded by: Office established
- Succeeded by: Bridget McKenzie (2017)

Assistant Minister for Health
- In office 18 September 2013 – 21 September 2015
- Prime Minister: Tony Abbott; Malcolm Turnbull
- Preceded by: Christopher Pyne (as Assistant Minister for Health and Ageing)
- Succeeded by: Ken Wyatt

Senator for New South Wales
- In office 1 July 2005 – 27 October 2017
- Succeeded by: Jim Molan

Personal details
- Born: Fiona Joy Morton; 6 May 1965 (age 61) Sydney, New South Wales, Australia
- Party: National
- Spouse: David Nash (m. 1989)
- Children: 2
- Education: Mitchell College of Advanced Education
- Occupation: Farmer; Politician

Fiona Joy Nash (née Morton; born 6 May 1965) is an Australian former politician. She served as a Senator for New South Wales from 2005 to 2017, representing the National Party. She was the party's deputy leader from 2016 to 2017 and was a cabinet minister in the Turnbull government.

Nash was a farmer in Crowther, New South Wales, prior to entering politics. She was elected to the Senate at the 2004 federal election. After a period as whip, she was elected as deputy Senate leader of the National Party in 2008. Nash was an assistant minister in the Abbott government from 2013 to 2015. In the Turnbull government she served as Minister for Rural Health (2015–2016), Regional Development (2016–2017), Regional Communications (2016–2017), and Local Government and Territories (2016–2017). Nash was elevated to cabinet upon her election as deputy leader of the National Party in February 2016, the first woman to hold the position. Her political career came to an end as a result of the parliament eligibility crisis of 2017, where she was disqualified from parliament for holding British citizenship in breach of section 44 of the constitution.

== Early life ==
Nash was born in Sydney on 6 May 1965, the daughter of Joy Stuart (née Hird) and Raemond Lothian Morton; her mother was born in Sydney and her father was born in Scotland. Her parents met in the UK where her mother was working as a doctor, moving to Australia in the early 1960s. They divorced in 1973 and she was subsequently raised by her mother.

Nash completed a Bachelor of Arts in liberal studies at the Mitchell College of Advanced Education. In 1991, she and her husband bought a farm in Crowther, New South Wales. They engaged in mixed farming, initially growing grain and bred Merino sheep for wool but later switching to sheep agistment and diversifying their crops. As of 2011, their property of 600 acres (240 ha) was split into sections for wheat and canola, hay, and sheep grazing.

== Politics ==
Nash joined the National Party in 1995. She was elected to the party's New South Wales state council in 1997 and to the state executive in 1999. She was also a delegate to the federal council from 2002 and treasurer of the women's federal council. Between 1999 and 2004, Nash worked as a staffer for National Party federal ministers Mark Vaile, Larry Anthony, and De-Anne Kelly.

Nash was elected to the Senate at the 2004 federal election, to a term beginning on 1 July 2005. She was only the third woman from her party elected to the Senate, after Agnes Robertson and Florence Bjelke-Petersen. In 2008, she was appointed Shadow Parliamentary Secretary for Water Resources and Conservation on the Opposition frontbench, but was asked to resign by Opposition Leader Malcolm Turnbull when she expressed her support for a motion by the Australian Greens to block the introduction of up-front tax breaks for carbon sinks. She did so, and subsequently crossed the floor with four other National senators to vote for the motion. After the 2010 election she returned to the Opposition frontbench when appointed Shadow Parliamentary Secretary for Regional Education by Opposition Leader Tony Abbott in September 2010.

Following the 2013 federal election, Nash was appointed Assistant Minister for Health in the Abbott government. In February 2014 she came under scrutiny after it was revealed that her chief of staff, Alastair Furnival, held shares in a lobby group, which culminated with his resignation the same month. In March the Senate formally censured Nash after she missed a deadline to produce a letter Furnival apparently wrote, outlining how he would avoid conflicts of interest, given that his wife owned a lobbying company, Australian Public Affairs, which represented junk food clients. Nash was appointed Minister for Rural Health on 21 September 2015, when Malcolm Turnbull replaced Tony Abbott as prime minister.

On 11 February 2016, Nash was elected deputy leader of the National Party, the first woman to hold the position. She replaced Barnaby Joyce, who had succeeded Warren Truss as party leader upon his retirement. Nash was consequently appointed to cabinet and given the additional portfolios of Minister for Regional Development and Minister for Regional Communications. She was also appointed Minister for Local Government and Territories on 19 July 2016.

=== Parliamentary eligibility and disqualification ===
On 17 August 2017, Nash became embroiled in the Australian parliamentary eligibility crisis, when she informed the Senate that she had received advice that she was a British citizen. Her citizenship had been acquired at birth, by descent from her Scottish-born father. She completed a declaration of renunciation of British citizenship on 18 August 2017. Her eligibility was considered by the High Court of Australia alongside numerous other cases of potential breaches of Section 44 of the Australian Constitution. On 27 October 2017, the court ruled that Nash had been ineligible to have been elected. She was replaced by Liberal candidate Jim Molan.

== Later activities ==
Nash took the role of Strategic Adviser, Regional Development at Charles Sturt University in early 2018.

In December 2021, Nash was appointed as Australia's first Regional Education Commissioner by the Morrison government, with the objective of championing greater equity between regional and city education.

== Personal life ==
Nash has two sons with her husband David Nash, whom she married in 1989.

Parliament of Australia
Political offices
Preceded by Paul Fletcher as Minister for Territories, Local Government and Major Projects	Minister for Local Government and Territories; 2016–2017	Succeeded by Darren Chester
Preceded by Warren Truss as Minister for Infrastructure and Regional Development	Minister for Regional Development; 2016–2017	Succeeded by Darren Chester
Vacant Title last held by Sharon Bird	Minister for Regional Communications; 2016–2017	Succeeded by Mitch Fifield
Vacant Title last held by Warren Snowdon as Minister for Indigenous Health	Minister for Rural Health; 2015–2016	Succeeded by David Gillespie as Assistant Minister for Rural Health
Vacant Title last held by Christopher Pyne as Assistant Minister for Health and Ageing	Assistant Minister for Health; 2013–2015	Vacant Title next held by Ken Wyatt
Party political offices
Preceded by Barnaby Joyce	Deputy Leader of the National Party of Australia; 2016–2017	Succeeded by Bridget McKenzie
Preceded by Ron Boswell	Deputy Leader of the National Party in the Senate; 2008–2017	Succeeded by Bridget McKenzie
