= Re Culleton (No 2) =

Judgement of the High Court of Australia

- Court: High Court of Australia as the Court of Disputed Returns
- Full case name: In the matter of questions referred to the Court of Disputed Returns pursuant to section 376 of the Commonwealth Electoral Act 1918 (Cth) concerning Senator Rodney Norman Culleton
- Decided: 3 February 2017
- Citations: [2017] HCA 4, 263 CLR 176
- Transcripts: 21 Nov [2016] HCATrans 288; 21 Nov [2016] HCATrans 289; 7 Dec [2016] HCATrans 296; 31 Jan [2017] HCATrans 9; 2 Mar [2017] HCATrans 45; 10 Mar [2017] HCATrans 51

Court membership
- Judges sitting: Kiefel, Bell, Gageler, Keane & Nettle JJ

Re Culleton (No 2) was a significant Australian court case, decided in the High Court of Australia sitting as the Court of Disputed Returns on 3 February 2017. The case was an influential decision concerning the construction of Section 44(ii) of the Constitution, which held that Rod Culleton's conviction for larceny meant that he was incapable of being chosen as a senator and the subsequent annulment of that conviction did not operate retroactively to deny the legal effect to the conviction from the time that it was recorded.

== Background ==
Culleton was declared one of the elected senator for Western Australia as the lead candidate on the Pauline Hanson's One Nation ticket during the 2016 federal election, which was held on 2 July 2016. At that time, he had been convicted in absentia on a larceny charge over a vehicle key in New South Wales, but had not yet been sentenced.

=== Criminal charge ===
In April 2014, Culleton was involved in a dispute with a tow truck driver in Guyra, New South Wales. The tow truck driver was attempting to repossess a truck and the key to the tow truck went missing. Culleton was charged with larceny in relation to the missing key. When the matter came before the local court in March 2016 Culleton was not present, saying he did not have time to travel to the Court as he was required to be in court in Western Australia the day before on unrelated larceny charges. Culleton was convicted in his absence. He successfully applied for the conviction be set aside, with the conviction being annulled on 8 August 2016. Culleton then pleaded guilty to the offence, and was ordered to pay the truck driver's costs with no conviction being recorded.

=== Section 44 of the Constitution ===
Under section 44(ii) of the Constitution, any person who "has been convicted and is under sentence, or subject to be sentenced, for any offence punishable under the law of the Commonwealth or of a State by imprisonment for one year or longer" shall (section 44 continues) "be incapable of being chosen or of sitting as a senator or a member of the House of Representatives". Previous time in prison was not a disqualification and there have been numerous politicians who had spent time in prison before their election. The High Court had previously observed that the disqualification is not simply for the conviction for an offence, nor serving time in prison. The disqualification required both conviction and that the person was imprisoned at the time or awaiting sentence. The WA larceny charge did not give rise to any question of disqualification as Culleton had only been charged and had not been convicted. At the time of Culleton's nomination and election, he had been convicted for the New South Wales offence but had not been sentenced.

A former colleague lodged a petition with the High Court (sitting as the Court of Disputed Returns), claiming that Culleton was not able to nominate for the election as he was convicted and awaiting sentence in New South Wales at the time of the election. Subsequently, the Australian Government asked the Senate to also refer the matter to the High Court; the reference included a request to determine what should be done if Culleton's seat were found to be vacant. The primary issues before the High Court concerned the effect of the subsequent annulment of Culleton's conviction and whether Culleton was subject to be sentenced to a term of imprisonment for one year or longer.

== Judgment ==
On 3 February 2017, the High Court determined the Senate reference, unanimously finding that Culleton had been ineligible for election to the Senate. At the time of the 2016 election he was subject to being sentenced to imprisonment for up to two years, which under Constitution section 44(ii) rendered him ineligible for election. This had not been affected by the subsequent annulment of the finding of guilt; the annulment had operated only from the time of the annulment. The vacancy should be filled by a special count of the ballot papers. Any directions necessary to give effect to the conduct of the special count should be made by a single Justice. However, the Court anticipated that a simple recount, as if Culleton had not been a candidate, would make the votes cast for him (so far as they were "above the line", which was 96% of them) would flow through to the next One Nation candidate. The Court ordered, as the Commonwealth had previously agreed, that most (with specific exceptions) of Culleton's costs of the action would be borne by the Commonwealth (Culleton had initially represented himself, but eventually he had been provided with counsel).

The majority stated, in an introductory summary of their judgment (with which Nettle J differed only as to reasoning):

Senator Culleton was a person who had been convicted and was subject to be sentenced for an offence punishable by imprisonment for one year or longer at the date of the 2016 election. That was so, both as a matter of fact and as a matter of law. The subsequent annulment of the conviction had no effect on that state of affairs. It follows from s 44(ii) that Senator Culleton was "incapable of being chosen" as a Senator. In the result, there is a vacancy in the representation of Western Australia in the Senate for the place for which Senator Culleton was returned.

== Result ==
Culleton had been found ineligible for election to the Senate. His vacancy was filled by a countback of the ballot papers in Western Australia, on the basis that Culleton's name was not on the paper. As had been anticipated, the recount resulted in votes cast for him, including the "above the line" votes (which were 96% of his vote) flowed through to the next One Nation candidate, which was Peter Georgiou, Culleton's brother-in-law. Georgiou's election was confirmed on 10 March and he was sworn in on 27 March 2017.

The government has demanded repayment by Culleton, as "a debt to the Commonwealth", of payments he had received while disqualified, and indicated it might also seek repayment of superannuation payments, other entitlements and staff payments.
