= Jim Molan =

Australian military officer and politician (1950–2023)

Major General Jim Molan AO, DSC
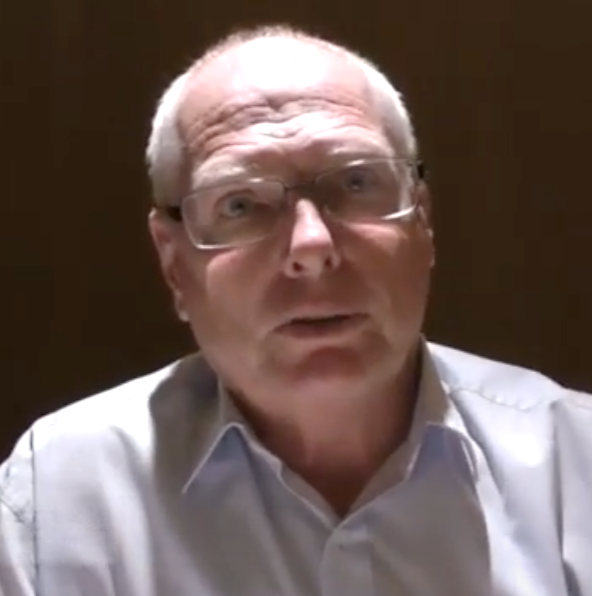
- In a Lowy Institute video in 2013

Senator for New South Wales
- In office 14 November 2019 – 16 January 2023
- Preceded by: Arthur Sinodinos
- Succeeded by: Maria Kovacic
- In office 22 December 2017 – 30 June 2019
- Preceded by: Fiona Nash

Personal details
- Born: Andrew James Molan; 11 April 1950 East Melbourne, Victoria, Australia
- Died: 16 January 2023 (aged 72) Melbourne, Australia
- Party: Liberal
- Spouse: Anne Molan (m. 1972)
- Children: 4, including Erin
- Education: University of New South Wales; University of Queensland
- Profession: Army officer; politician

Military service
- Allegiance: Australia
- Branch/service: Australian Army
- Years of service: 1968–2008
- Rank: Major general
- Commands: Australian Defence College; 1st Division; 1st Brigade; 6th Battalion, Royal Australian Regiment
- Battles/wars: East Timor; Iraq War; Operation Catalyst
- Awards: Officer of the Order of Australia; Distinguished Service Cross; Officer of the Legion of Merit (United States)

Major General Andrew James Molan, AO, DSC (11 April 1950 – 16 January 2023) was an Australian politician and a senior officer in the Australian Army. He was a Liberal Party senator for New South Wales from December 2017 to June 2019 and from November 2019 until his death in January 2023.

During his military career, Molan commanded the 6th Battalion, Royal Australian Regiment, the 1st Brigade, the 1st Division and its Deployable Joint Force Headquarters, and the Australian Defence College. In April 2004, he was deployed to Iraq for a year to serve as chief of operations of the new headquarters for the Multinational Force in Iraq. He was awarded the Distinguished Service Cross, as well as the Legion of Merit by the United States government. He retired from the Australian Army in 2008, and later that year released his first book, Running the War in Iraq.

Following his retirement from the Australian Army, Molan was appointed by the Abbott government as a special envoy for Operation Sovereign Borders and was subsequently credited with being an architect of the coalition's Stop the Boats Australian border protection and asylum-seeker policies. In 2016, Molan unsuccessfully stood as a Liberal Party candidate for the Senate in New South Wales at the 2016 federal election. In December 2017, during the parliamentary eligibility crisis, the High Court declared him elected in place of Fiona Nash, who was ineligible to stand. He was not re-elected to the Senate in the 2019 federal election.

On 10 November 2019, Molan was selected by the NSW Liberal Party to fill the casual vacancy left by the resignation of Senator Arthur Sinodinos. He was appointed by a joint sitting of the NSW Parliament on 14 November 2019. At the 2022 election, he was re-elected to a six-year term that was supposed to expire 30 June 2028. He died less than a year into his new term.

== Early life and education ==
Molan joined the Australian Army following completion of his schooling in Victoria. On graduating from the Royal Military College, Duntroon in 1971, he was allocated to the Royal Australian Infantry Corps. He graduated with a Bachelor of Arts from the University of New South Wales and a Bachelor of Economics from the University of Queensland. He was a graduate of the Australian defence force's School of Languages where he studied Indonesian. He maintained an interest in aviation and held civil commercial licences and instrument ratings for fixed and rotary wing aircraft. He was also a fellow of the Australian Institute of Company Directors (FAICD) and was accredited as a master project director (MPD).

== Military career ==
Molan had a long and active military career. Regimental postings included the 1st Battalion, Pacific Islands Regiment (Papua New Guinea) as a rifle platoon commander; 9th Battalion, Royal Queensland Regiment, as adjutant; rifle company second-in-command and rifle company commander in the 3rd Battalion, Royal Australian Regiment; commanding officer of the 6th Battalion, Royal Australian Regiment; commander of the Army's mechanised 1st Brigade; and commander of the 1st Division and its Deployable Joint Force Headquarters. Molan was the commander of the Australian Defence College, including the Australian Defence Force Academy; the Australian Command and Staff College; and the Australian Centre for Defence and Strategic Studies.

Molan served as the army attaché in Jakarta as a colonel between 1992 and 1994 and for this service he was awarded the Indonesian decoration Bintang Dharma Yudha Nararya in 1995. Between 1998 and 1999, Molan was the defence attaché in Jakarta as a brigadier and served in East Timor. On 25 March 2000 he was upgraded to an Officer of the Order of Australia for his service in Indonesia and in East Timor.

In April 2004, he was deployed for a year to Iraq. He was despatched to serve as the chief of operations of the new Multinational Force in Iraq headquarters that was being planned. However, he initially instead spent some time trying to find a specific role within the headquarters structure, before being allocated responsibility for energy security. He was eventually made deputy chief of staff for operations, and served during continuous and intense combat operations. For distinguished command and leadership in this period, he was awarded the Distinguished Service Cross, and the American Legion of Merit. Molan has been accused of responsibility for planning and carrying out multiple purported war crimes during the attack on Fallujah in late 2004. For his role in the attacks on Fallujah, he has been referred to as the "butcher of Fallujah".

After returning from Iraq he served as defence materiel advocate for the Defence Materiel Organisation; and adviser to the Vice Chief of the Defence Force on Joint Warfighting Lessons and Concepts. Major General Molan retired in July 2008.

== Post-military ==
In August 2008, Molan released his first book, Running the War in Iraq. The book concentrated on his experience as chief of operations in Iraq during 2004–05, and contained some criticism about Australia's capacity to engage in military conflict. In an August 2008 speech, Molan stated that: "Our military competence was far worse than even we thought before East Timor, and people may not realise that the military performance bar has been raised by the nature of current conflict, as illustrated in Iraq and Afghanistan". Writing in a February 2009 article, Molan called for a doubling of the Australian military presence in Afghanistan, from about 1,100 troops to 2,000.

Molan was associated with the Liberal Party, helping to launch the Liberal opposition party's military-led border protection campaign in the lead up to the 2013 federal election in Brisbane on 25 July 2013. Molan has been an outspoken critic of Labor's management of defence matters. Stephen Smith, the minister for defence at the time, described Molan as "partisan" and a "Liberal Party activist". In mid-2014 Molan was engaged as an advisor to minister for defence David Johnston, but resigned after three weeks. In a subsequent interview, Molan implied that his resignation was due to dissatisfaction with Johnston.

== Political career ==
At the 2016 federal election, Molan was a Liberal party senate candidate for New South Wales. However, in what former prime minister Tony Abbott called a "tragedy for our country and for our party", Molan failed to be elected.

In November 2017, the High Court of Australia ruled that Nationals Senator Fiona Nash was ineligible to be elected to the Senate due to her dual British citizenship. On 22 December, the High Court declared Molan duly elected in place of Nash.

In February 2018, it was revealed that Molan shared, on his personal Facebook page in March 2017, anti-Muslim content from the far-right political party Britain First. Molan refused to apologise for his sharing of this material. In response to the Facebook post, Greens MP Adam Bandt accused Molan of war crimes over his actions in Iraq, but later apologised.

Molan was a member of the centre-right faction of the Liberal Party.

=== 2019 federal election ===
In November 2018, Molan polled the third-highest number of votes in the Liberal Party's Senate preselection ballot for the 2019 federal election. Subsequently he was placed in the "unwinnable" fourth position on the coalition's Senate ticket in New South Wales, below Hollie Hughes, Andrew Bragg, and the Nationals' candidate Perin Davey.

Molan was disappointed at being relegated to a low-priority position on the official Coalition NSW Senate ticket and spoke of being unable to defend the Liberal Party after the decision. In May 2019, during the Australian Federal election campaign, a row broke out affecting both the Liberal Party and the National Party when Molan began an independent campaign to be elected, not supported by the Liberal Party. Molan and his supporters began urging voters to ignore the official joint how-to-vote instructions issued by both the Liberal Party and the National Party, encouraging them to vote directly for Molan. That independent campaign was reported in the media as leading to marked divisions within the Liberal and National Parties. Disagreement grew, to the extent that, in the week before the election, senior officials of the National Party in NSW took the "extraordinary step" of advising voters to ignore the agreed Liberal-National how-to-vote card and vote directly for the preferred National Party candidates. Former deputy prime minister and parliamentary leader of the National Party, Barnaby Joyce, was reported as saying that the row threatened to undermine the coalition agreement which existed between the Liberal and National Parties at the federal level.

However, on 10 November 2019, Molan was selected by the NSW Liberal Party to fill the casual vacancy left by the resignation of Senator Arthur Sinodinos. He was appointed by a joint sitting of the NSW Parliament on 14 November 2019, and served the remainder of Sinodinos's six-year term, which expired in June 2022. Molan was re-elected at the 2022 federal election for a six-year term starting on 1 July 2022.

== Published works ==
Molan published his opinion on matters related to his expertise, and gave interviews and speeches to recount his experiences. The following is an incomplete list of his published works, interviews, speeches, opinion pieces and debates:

=== Books ===
- Molan, Jim (2005). Operations in the Land of Two Rivers. Australian Defence College, Centre for Defence Command, Leadership and Management Studies.
- Molan, Jim (23 July 2013). Running the War in Iraq: An Australian General, 300,000 Troops, the Bloodiest Conflict of Our Time. HarperCollins. ISBN 978-0-7322-8781-8.
- Molan, Jim (2022). Danger on Our Doorstep. Sydney: HarperCollins. ISBN 9781460762608.

=== Articles and opinion pieces ===
- Molan, Jim (2006). "Iraq Truisms: Five Truisms for the ADF out of Iraq" (PDF). Australian Defence Force Journal (171). Australian Defence Force: 8–17.
- Molan, Jim (4 August 2008). "Australia's war unreadiness". Unleashed. ABC News.
- Bolt, Andrew (16 October 2008). "Andrew Bolt Blog: How we must fight in Afghanistan". Herald Sun. Archived from the original on 17 October 2008.
- Molan, Jim (17 February 2009). "End the pussyfooting in Afghan war". The Australian. Archived from the original on 18 December 2018.
- Molan, Jim (6 July 2009). "Thoughts on operations in southern Afghanistan". The Lowy Interpreter. Australia: Lowy Institute for International Policy.
- Molan, Jim (August 2009). "Empty title" (PDF). Australian Army Journal. Australian Army.
- Molan, Jim (2 October 2009). "UN's bias binds Gaza". The Australian.; in response to comments made by Richard Goldstone in The New York Times.

=== Speeches, interviews and debates ===
- Molan, Jim (21 July 2008). "Molan speaks about Iraq". The 7.30 Report (Interview: transcript). Interviewed by Kerry O'Brien. Australia: ABC TV.
- Molan, Jim (3 October 2008). Running the war in Iraq: The nature of modern warfare and the new Defence White Paper (Speech). Australia: Lowy Institute for International Policy. Archived from the original (transcript) on 12 September 2009.
- Molan, Jim (29 August 2009). Afghanistan worth doing, even badly (transcript of debate) (Speech). Australia: Lowy Institute for International Policy.

== Personal life ==
Molan, son of Andrew Molan, a World War II veteran, and Noni (née Harnetty), was born in Melbourne on 11 April 1950. He was married to Anne and they had three daughters and a son. One of their daughters, Erin Molan, is a media personality and was a presenter of the rugby league television program The Footy Show.

=== Illness and death ===
On 5 April 2021, Molan announced that he had been diagnosed with an aggressive form of cancer, and that he would be taking leave from the Senate to undergo further testing and treatment.

Molan died on 16 January 2023, at age 72.

Military offices
Preceded by Rear Admiral Raydon Gates	Commander Australian Defence College; 2002–2004	Succeeded by Rear Admiral Mark Bonser
Preceded by Major General Peter Cosgrove	Commander 1st Division; 1999–2002	Succeeded by Major General Mark Evans
