= Chapter II of the Constitution of Australia =

Chapter II of the Constitution of Australia establishes the executive branch of the Commonwealth of Australia. It provides for the exercise of executive power by the Governor-General of Australia advised by a Federal Executive Council.

== Sections ==
=== Section 61: Executive power ===
The executive power of the Commonwealth is vested in the Queen and is exercisable by the Governor‑General as the Queen's representative, and extends to the execution and maintenance of this Constitution, and of the laws of the Commonwealth.

Section 61 vests the executive power of the Commonwealth in the monarch of Australia, and makes this power exercisable by the governor-general on behalf of the monarch as their representative. In practice, the governor-general only exercises this power on the advice of the Federal Executive Council which he or she presides over.

=== Section 62: Federal Executive Council ===
There shall be a Federal Executive Council to advise the Governor‑General in the government of the Commonwealth, and the members of the Council shall be chosen and summoned by the Governor‑General and sworn as Executive Councillors, and shall hold office during his pleasure.

Section 62 establishes the Federal Executive Council which advises the governor-general. In practice the governor-general is bound by convention to follow this advice, and although he or she is described as having the power to choose the members of the Federal Executive Council, generally all parliamentarians who are appointed a ministerial portfolio automatically become members and remain so for life.

=== Section 63: Provisions referring to Governor-General ===
The provisions of this Constitution referring to the Governor‑General in Council shall be construed as referring to the Governor‑General acting with the advice of the Federal Executive Council.

=== Section 64: Ministers of State ===
The Governor‑General may appoint officers to administer such departments of State of the Commonwealth as the Governor‑General in Council may establish.

Such officers shall hold office during the pleasure of the Governor‑General. They shall be members of the Federal Executive Council, and shall be the Queen's Ministers of State for the Commonwealth.

After the first general election no Minister of State shall hold office for a longer period than three months unless he is or becomes a senator or a member of the House of Representatives.

=== Section 65: Numbers of Ministers ===
Until the Parliament otherwise provides, the Ministers of State shall not exceed seven in number, and shall hold such offices as the Parliament prescribes, or, in the absence of provision, as the Governor‑General directs.

=== Section 66: Salaries of Ministers ===
There shall be payable to the Queen, out of the Consolidated Revenue Fund of the Commonwealth, for the salaries of the Ministers of State, an annual sum which, until the Parliament otherwise provides, shall not exceed twelve thousand pounds a year.

=== Section 67: Appointment of civil servants ===
Until the Parliament otherwise provides, the appointment and removal of all other officers of the Executive Government of the Commonwealth shall be vested in the Governor‑General in Council, unless the appointment is delegated by the Governor‑General in Council or by a law of the Commonwealth to some other authority.

=== Section 68: Command of naval and military forces ===
The command in chief of the naval and military forces of the Commonwealth is vested in the Governor‑General as the Queen's representative.

Section 68 vests command of the Australian Defence Force in the governor-general, as the representative of the Sovereign. In practice this role is limited to ceremonial duties, including attending military parades and services, and appointing the chiefs of the Defence Force, Army, Navy, and Air Force, which (along with all decisions made by the governor-general in his or her capacity as commander-in-chief) is done on the advice of the Federal Executive Council. Actual command of the armed forces is wielded by the Minister for Defence, who is responsible for defence policy, and the Chief of the Defence Force, who is responsible for the administration and operation of the military.

=== Section 69: Transfer of certain departments ===
On a date or dates to be proclaimed by the Governor‑General after the establishment of the Commonwealth the following departments of the public service in each State shall become transferred to the Commonwealth:—

Posts, telegraphs, and telephones:
Naval and military defence:
Lighthouses, lightships, beacons, and buoys:
Quarantine.

But the departments of customs and of excise in each State shall become transferred to the Commonwealth on its establishment.

=== Section 70: Certain powers of Governors to vest in Governor-General ===
In respect of matters which, under this Constitution, pass to the Executive Government of the Commonwealth, all powers and functions which at the establishment of the Commonwealth are vested in the Governor of a Colony, or in the Governor of a Colony with the advice of his Executive Council, or in any authority of a Colony, shall vest in the Governor‑General, or in the Governor‑General in Council, or in the authority exercising similar powers under the Commonwealth, as the case requires.
