= Section 46 of the Constitution of Australia =

Transitional penalty for ineligible person sitting in parliament

Section 46 of the Constitution of Australia provides a penalty for a Senator or member of the House of Representatives who sits while constitutionally ineligible or disqualified from holding that position.

The text specifies that, until the Parliament specifies otherwise, the ineligible member will be liable to pay any person who sues for it 100 pounds for every day that they have sat. With the introduction of the Australian dollar on 14 February 1966, 10 shillings converted to A$1, meaning that the penalty became A$200 per day. In 1975, Parliament passed the Common Informers (Parliamentary Disqualifications) Act 1975, which modified the penalty.

== The Constitution ==
Section 46 of the Constitution states:

46. Until the Parliament otherwise provides, any person declared by this Constitution to be incapable of sitting as a senator or as a member of the House of Representatives shall, for every day on which he so sits, be liable to pay the sum of one hundred pounds to any person who sues for it in any court of competent jurisdiction.

== Common Informers (Parliamentary Disqualifications) Act 1975 ==
Section 46 only applied "until the Parliament otherwise provides". Prompted by the case of James Webster, a Senator whose eligibility to sit was questioned in the High Court, Parliament passed the Common Informers (Parliamentary Disqualifications) Act 1975 ("Common Informers Act"), which replaced the constitutional scheme of penalties for members sitting while ineligible. If Webster was found to have sat whilst ineligible, the penalty under the constitution might have exceeded $57,200.

Under the Common Informers Act, the quantum of damages which can be recovered is significantly reduced. A person found to be ineligible is liable for a single payment of $200 for sitting in Parliament on or before the day they received notice of the suit challenging their eligibility, and a $200 payment for every day they sit in Parliament after receiving notice of the suit. A twelve-month statute of limitations has been introduced, and it is made explicit that a person may not be penalised twice for the same sitting.

=== David Gillespie ===
The Common Informers Act was invoked in the matter of Alley v Gillespie. The suit brought under the Common Informers Act was against Nationals MP David Gillespie. It was alleged that Gillespie was in breach of s 44(v) of the Constitution because his family company, Goldenboot Pty Ltd, owned part of a shopping centre in Port Macquarie, NSW, in which an Australia Post franchise operated. The following question was heard on 12 December 2017 by the Full Court of the High Court:

Can and should the High Court decide whether the defendant was a person declared by the Constitution to be incapable of sitting as a Member of the House of Representatives for the purposes of section 3 of the Common Informers (Parliamentary Disqualifications) Act 1975 (Cth) ("Common Informers Act")?

On 21 March 2018 the High Court unanimously determined that the answer to the question was "no", with the majority finding:

Whilst the question posed by these words in s 46 is one necessary to be determined before a person is liable to the imposition of a penalty, it is not necessary that the answer to that question be determined by the court hearing a common informer action. Indeed, there may be good reason to conclude that the question should not be determined in that proceeding, given that the same question is to be dealt with under s 47 and that it may be part only of the overlapping questions which may there arise.

Gageler J provided separate reasoning:

The question posed by s 46 of whether a senator or member against whom a suit is brought is a "person declared by this Constitution to be incapable of sitting" answers the description of a "question respecting the qualification" of that senator or member within the meaning of s 47. The consequence is that, unless the Parliament otherwise provides for the purpose of s 47, that element of the cause of action created by s 46 or by a law enacted under s 51(xxxvi) for the purpose of s 46 can only be established by a prior determination of the Senate or the House.

The result of the decision is that the operation of s 46 of the Constitution (and by extension the Common Informers Act) requires a prior finding of ineligibility by the House of Representatives or the Senate (depending on which house the affected person is a member of), or the Court of Disputed Returns exercising its jurisdiction under the Commonwealth Electoral Act 1918 (Cth) (through either the petition or referral mechanism in Part XXII). The penalty provided for under the Common Informers Act may only thereafter be pursued once a finding on liability has been made.

=== Malcolm Roberts ===
In September 2017, before the High Court ruling on the eligibility of Malcolm Roberts, blogger Tony Magrathea initiated a High Court action alleging that Roberts had sat in the Senate while disqualified, contrary to the Common Informers Act. On 24 June 2019, the High Court found the allegation proved and ordered Roberts to pay a penalty of $6,000 to Magrathea.

== See also ==
- Section 44 of the Constitution of Australia: Disqualification
- Section 45 of the Constitution of Australia: Vacancy on happening of disqualification
