= Members of the Australian House of Representatives, 2016–2019 =

Members of the Australian House of Representatives, 2016-2019
- ←2013-2016 2019-2022→

Composition (April 2019)

Government (73)
Coalition
Liberal (43)
Liberal National (21) (Note: 15 LNP MPs sit in the Liberal party room and 6 in the National party room)
National (9) (Note: 9 National MPs sit with the government; one, Kevin Hogan, sits on the crossbench)

Opposition (69)
Labor (69)

Crossbench (8)
Greens (1)
Katter (1)
Centre Alliance (1)
National (1)
Independent (4) (Note: Current Independent MPs: Andrew Wilkie (Denison), Cathy McGowan (Indi), Kerryn Phelps (Wentworth), Julia Banks (Chisholm).)

This is a list of members of the Australian House of Representatives of the 45th Parliament of Australia (2016–2019).

The 45th Parliament, elected on 2 July 2016, was sworn in on its opening on 30 August 2016. (Note: The changes to the composition of the House, in chronological order, were Joyce ineligible, (Note: On 27 October 2017, the High Court of Australia found Nationals MP Barnaby Joyce (New England) ineligible to be a member of parliament. A by-election was held on 2 December 2017, with Joyce regaining the seat.) Alexander resigned, (Note: On 11 November 2017, Liberal MP John Alexander (Bennelong) resigned, following concerns that he held British citizenship by descent. A by-election was held on 16 December 2017, with Alexander regaining the seat after having renounced his citizenship.) Feeney resigned, (Note: On 1 February 2018, Labor MP David Feeney (Batman) resigned, following concerns that he held British citizenship by descent. Labor candidate Ged Kearney won the resulting by-election on 17 March 2018.) Keay, Lamb, Wilson & Sharkie resigned, (Note: On 9 May 2018, the High Court ruled Senator Katy Gallagher ineligible due to her British citizenship by descent at nomination. Labor MPs Justine Keay, Susan Lamb, and Josh Wilson resigned on 10 May following the judgment. Centre Alliance MP Rebekha Sharkie resigned on 11 May. Keay, Lamb, Sharkie and Wilson regained their seats in by-elections for Braddon, Longman, Mayo and Fremantle respectively held on 28 July 2018.) Hammond resigned, (Note: On 10 May 2018, Labor MP Tim Hammond (Perth) resigned. Labor candidate Patrick Gorman won the resulting by-election on 28 July 2018.) Turnbull resigned, (Note: On 31 August 2018, Liberal MP and former Prime Minister Malcolm Turnbull (Wentworth) resigned. Independent candidate Kerryn Phelps won the resulting by-election on 20 October 2018.) Julia Banks resigned from the Liberal party, (Note: On 27 November 2018, Liberal MP Julia Banks (Chisholm) resigned from the Liberal Party to sit on the crossbench as an independent.))

Member	Party	Electorate	State	Years in office
Tony Abbott	Liberal	Warringah	NSW	1994–2019
Anthony Albanese	Labor	Grayndler	NSW	1996–present
John Alexander	Liberal	Bennelong	NSW	2010–2017; 2017–2022
Anne Aly	Labor	Cowan	WA	2016–present
Karen Andrews	Liberal National (Note: A member of the LNP who sits with the Liberal Party.)	McPherson	Qld	2010–2025
Kevin Andrews	Liberal	Menzies	Vic	1991–2022
Adam Bandt	Greens	Melbourne	Vic	2010–2025
Julia Banks	Liberal/Independent	Chisholm	Vic	2016–2019
Sharon Bird	Labor	Cunningham	NSW	2004–2022
Julie Bishop	Liberal	Curtin	WA	1998–2019
Chris Bowen	Labor	McMahon	NSW	2004–present
Andrew Broad	National	Mallee	Vic	2013–2019
Russell Broadbent	Liberal	McMillan	Vic	1990–1993; 1996–1998; 2004–2025
Gai Brodtmann	Labor	Canberra	ACT	2010–2019
Scott Buchholz	Liberal National	Wright	Qld	2010–present
Tony Burke	Labor	Watson	NSW	2004–present
Linda Burney	Labor	Barton	NSW	2016–2025
Mark Butler	Labor	Port Adelaide	SA	2007–present
Terri Butler	Labor	Griffith	Qld	2014–2022
Anthony Byrne	Labor	Holt	Vic	1999–2022
Jim Chalmers	Labor	Rankin	Qld	2013–present
Nick Champion	Labor	Wakefield	SA	2007–2022
Darren Chester	National	Gippsland	Vic	2008–present
Lisa Chesters	Labor	Bendigo	Vic	2013–present
George Christensen	Liberal National (Note: A member of the LNP who sits with the National Party.)	Dawson	Qld	2010–2022
Steven Ciobo	Liberal National	Moncrieff	Qld	2001–2019
Jason Clare	Labor	Blaxland	NSW	2007–present
Sharon Claydon	Labor	Newcastle	NSW	2013–present
David Coleman	Liberal	Banks	NSW	2013–2025
Julie Collins	Labor	Franklin	Tas	2007–present
Pat Conroy	Labor	Shortland	NSW	2013–present
Mark Coulton	National	Parkes	NSW	2007–2025
Chris Crewther	Liberal	Dunkley	Vic	2016–2019
Michael Danby	Labor	Melbourne Ports	Vic	1998–2019
Milton Dick	Labor	Oxley	Qld	2016–present
Mark Dreyfus	Labor	Isaacs	Vic	2007–present
Damian Drum	National	Murray	Vic	2016–2022
Peter Dutton	Liberal National	Dickson	Qld	2001–2025
Justine Elliot	Labor	Richmond	NSW	2004–present
Kate Ellis	Labor	Adelaide	SA	2004–2019
Warren Entsch	Liberal National	Leichhardt	Qld	1996–2007; 2010–2025
Trevor Evans	Liberal National	Brisbane	Qld	2016–present
Jason Falinski	Liberal	Mackellar	NSW	2016–2022
David Feeney	Labor	Batman	Vic	2013–2018
Joel Fitzgibbon	Labor	Hunter	NSW	1996–2022
Paul Fletcher	Liberal	Bradfield	NSW	2009–2025
Nicolle Flint	Liberal	Boothby	SA	2016–2022
Mike Freelander	Labor	Macarthur	NSW	2016–present
Josh Frydenberg	Liberal	Kooyong	Vic	2010–2022
Andrew Gee	National	Calare	NSW	2016–present
Steve Georganas	Labor	Hindmarsh	SA	2004–2013; 2016–present
Andrew Giles	Labor	Scullin	Vic	2013–present
David Gillespie	National	Lyne	NSW	2013–2025
Ian Goodenough	Liberal	Moore	WA	2013–2025
Patrick Gorman	Labor	Perth	WA	2018–present
Luke Gosling	Labor	Solomon	NT	2016–present
Tim Hammond	Labor	Perth	WA	2016–2018
Ross Hart	Labor	Bass	Tas	2016–2019
Luke Hartsuyker	National	Cowper	NSW	2001–2019
Andrew Hastie	Liberal	Canning	WA	2015–present
Alex Hawke	Liberal	Mitchell	NSW	2007–present
Chris Hayes	Labor	Fowler	NSW	2005–2022
Sarah Henderson	Liberal	Corangamite	Vic	2013–2019
Julian Hill	Labor	Bruce	Vic	2016–present
Kevin Hogan	National	Page	NSW	2013–present
Luke Howarth	Liberal National	Petrie	Qld	2013–2025
Greg Hunt	Liberal	Flinders	Vic	2001–2022
Emma Husar	Labor	Lindsay	NSW	2016–2019
Ed Husic	Labor	Chifley	NSW	2010–present
Steve Irons	Liberal	Swan	WA	2007–2022
Stephen Jones	Labor	Whitlam	NSW	2010–2025
Barnaby Joyce	National	New England	NSW	2013–2017; 2017–present
Bob Katter	Katter's Australian	Kennedy	Qld	1993–present
Ged Kearney	Labor	Batman	Vic	2018–present
Justine Keay	Labor	Braddon	Tas	2016–2018; 2018–2019
Michael Keenan	Liberal	Stirling	WA	2004–2019
Craig Kelly	Liberal	Hughes	NSW	2010–2022
Mike Kelly	Labor	Eden-Monaro	NSW	2007–2013; 2016–2020
Matt Keogh	Labor	Burt	WA	2016–present
Peter Khalil	Labor	Wills	Vic	2016–present
Catherine King	Labor	Ballarat	Vic	2001–present
Madeleine King	Labor	Brand	WA	2016–present
Susan Lamb	Labor	Longman	Qld	2016–2018; 2018–2019
Andrew Laming	Liberal National	Bowman	Qld	2004–2022
Michelle Landry	Liberal National	Capricornia	Qld	2013–present
Craig Laundy	Liberal	Reid	NSW	2013–2019
Julian Leeser	Liberal	Berowra	NSW	2016–present
Andrew Leigh	Labor	Fenner	ACT	2010–present
Sussan Ley	Liberal	Farrer	NSW	2001–2026
David Littleproud	Liberal National	Maranoa	Qld	2016–present
Jenny Macklin	Labor	Jagajaga	Vic	1996–2019
Nola Marino	Liberal	Forrest	WA	2007–2025
Richard Marles	Labor	Corio	Vic	2007–present
Emma McBride	Labor	Dobell	NSW	2016–present
Michael McCormack	National	Riverina	NSW	2010–present
Cathy McGowan	Independent	Indi	Vic	2013–2019
John McVeigh	Liberal National	Groom	Qld	2016–2020
Brian Mitchell	Labor	Lyons	Tas	2016–2025
Rob Mitchell	Labor	McEwen	Vic	2010–present
Scott Morrison	Liberal	Cook	NSW	2007–2024
Ben Morton	Liberal	Tangney	WA	2016–2022
Shayne Neumann	Labor	Blair	Qld	2007–present
Llew O'Brien	Liberal National	Wide Bay	Qld	2016–present
Ted O'Brien	Liberal National	Fairfax	Qld	2016–present
Brendan O'Connor	Labor	Gorton	Vic	2001–2025
Ken O'Dowd	Liberal National	Flynn	Qld	2010–2022
Kelly O'Dwyer	Liberal	Higgins	Vic	2009–2019
Clare O'Neil	Labor	Hotham	Vic	2013–present
Cathy O'Toole	Labor	Herbert	Qld	2016–2019
Julie Owens	Labor	Parramatta	NSW	2004–present
Tony Pasin	Liberal	Barker	SA	2013–present
Graham Perrett	Labor	Moreton	Qld	2007–2025
Kerryn Phelps	Independent	Wentworth	NSW	2018–2019
Keith Pitt	Liberal National	Hinkler	Qld	2013–2025
Tanya Plibersek	Labor	Sydney	NSW	1998–present
Christian Porter	Liberal	Pearce	WA	2013–2022
Jane Prentice	Liberal National	Ryan	Qld	2010–2019
Melissa Price	Liberal	Durack	WA	2013–present
Christopher Pyne	Liberal	Sturt	SA	1993–2019
Rowan Ramsey	Liberal	Grey	SA	2007–2025
Amanda Rishworth	Labor	Kingston	SA	2007–present
Stuart Robert	Liberal National	Fadden	Qld	2007–2023
Michelle Rowland	Labor	Greenway	NSW	2010–present
Joanne Ryan	Labor	Lalor	Vic	2013–present
Rebekha Sharkie	Xenophon/Centre Alliance	Mayo	SA	2016–2018; 2018–present
Bill Shorten	Labor	Maribyrnong	Vic	2007–2025
Tony Smith	Liberal	Casey	Vic	2001–2022
Warren Snowdon	Labor	Lingiari	NT	1987–1996; 1998–2022
Anne Stanley	Labor	Werriwa	NSW	2016–present
Ann Sudmalis	Liberal	Gilmore	NSW	2013–2019
Michael Sukkar	Liberal	Deakin	Vic	2013–2025
Wayne Swan	Labor	Lilley	Qld	1993–1996; 1998–2019
Meryl Swanson	Labor	Paterson	NSW	2016–present
Angus Taylor	Liberal	Hume	NSW	2013–present
Dan Tehan	Liberal	Wannon	Vic	2010–present
Susan Templeman	Labor	Macquarie	NSW	2016–present
Matt Thistlethwaite	Labor	Kingsford Smith	NSW	2013–present
Alan Tudge	Liberal	Aston	Vic	2010–2023
Malcolm Turnbull	Liberal	Wentworth	NSW	2004–2018
Maria Vamvakinou	Labor	Calwell	Vic	2001–2025
Bert van Manen	Liberal National	Forde	Qld	2010–2025
Ross Vasta	Liberal National	Bonner	Qld	2004–2007; 2010–2025
Andrew Wallace	Liberal National	Fisher	Qld	2016–present
Tim Watts	Labor	Gellibrand	Vic	2013–present
Lucy Wicks	Liberal	Robertson	NSW	2013–2022
Andrew Wilkie	Independent	Denison	Tas	2010–present
Josh Wilson	Labor	Fremantle	WA	2016–2018; 2018–present
Rick Wilson	Liberal	O'Connor	WA	2013–present
Tim Wilson	Liberal	Goldstein	Vic	2016–2022; 2025–present
Jason Wood	Liberal	La Trobe	Vic	2004–2010; 2013–present
Ken Wyatt	Liberal	Hasluck	WA	2010–2022
Tony Zappia	Labor	Makin	SA	2007–present
Trent Zimmerman	Liberal	North Sydney	NSW	2015–2022
