= 45th Parliament of Australia =

2016–2019 Australian legislative term

45th Parliament of the Commonwealth of Australia
- 44th ← → 46th
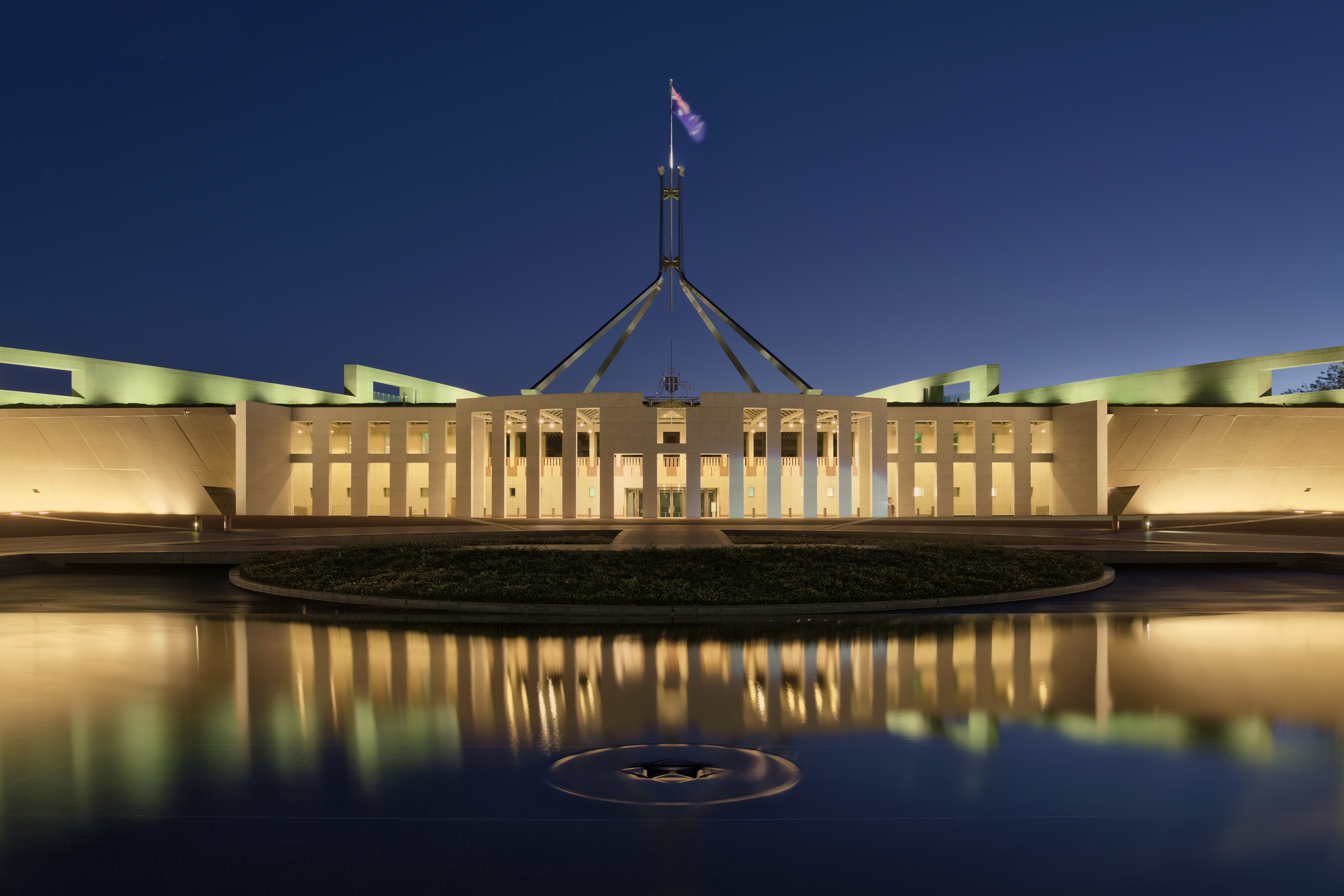
- Parliament House (2017) Parliament House (2017)

30 August 2016 – 11 April 2019
- Members: 76 senators 150 representatives
- Senate Leader: George Brandis (until 20 December 2017); Mathias Cormann (from 20 December 2017)
- Senate President: Stephen Parry (until 2 November 2017); Scott Ryan (from 13 November 2017)
- House Leader: Christopher Pyne
- House Speaker: Tony Smith

Sessions
- 1st: 30 August 2016 – 4 April 2019

The 45th Parliament of Australia was a meeting of the legislative branch of the Australian federal government, composed of the Australian Senate and the Australian House of Representatives. It met in Canberra from 30 August 2016 to 4 April 2019. The 2016 general election held on 2 July gave the Coalition of the Liberal and National Parties control of the House, albeit with a slimmer majority than the 44th Parliament, allowing their leader Malcolm Turnbull to stay in office as the 29th Prime Minister of Australia. During the term of the parliament, the government slipped into minority due to defections and by-elections. The leadership of the government also changed during the parliament, when Scott Morrison replaced Turnbull as Liberal Leader and Prime Minister in August 2018. The 45th Parliament was officially prorogued by the Governor-General Sir Peter Cosgrove at 8:29 a.m. on 11 April 2019, and the House of Representatives dissolved at 8:30 a.m.

== 2016 federal election ==
=== House of Representatives ===
At the 2016 federal election, in the 150-seat House of Representatives, the incumbent Coalition government was reelected with 76 seats, a majority of one seat. The Labor opposition won 69 seats. Five other MPs were elected to the crossbench, with the Greens, the Nick Xenophon Team, Katter's Australian Party, and independents Andrew Wilkie and Cathy McGowan winning a seat each.

=== Composition ===
Government (76) Coalition Liberal (45) LNP (21) (Note: 15 LNP MPs sit in the Liberal party room and 6 in the National party room) National (10) Opposition (69) Labor (69) Crossbench (5) Greens (1) Xenophon (1) Katter (1) Independent (2) (Note: independent MPs: Andrew Wilkie (Denison) and Cathy McGowan (Indi).)

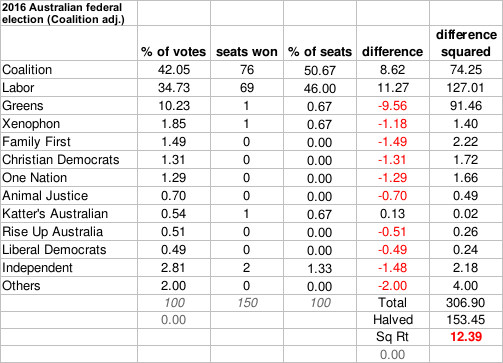
According to the 1−100 Gallagher Index, the disproportionality in the lower house is comparatively high at about 12.7 in 2016 − compared to 9.7 in 2013, 11.3 in 2010 and 10.3 in 2007.

House of Representatives (IRV) — Turnout 91.01% (CV) — Informal 5.05%
Party	Votes	%	Swing	Seats	Change
Australian Labor Party	4,702,296	34.73	+1.35	69	▲14
Coalition	5,693,605	42.04	−3.51	76	▼14
Liberal Party of Australia	3,882,905	28.67	−3.35	45	▼13
Liberal National Party (QLD)	1,153,736	8.52	−0.40	21	▼1
National Party of Australia	624,555	4.61	+0.32	10	▲1
Country Liberal Party (NT)	32,409	0.24	−0.08	0	▼1
Australian Greens	1,385,650	10.23	+1.58	1	Steady
Nick Xenophon Team	250,333	1.85	+1.85	1	▲1
Katter's Australian Party	72,879	0.54	−0.50	1	Steady
Palmer United Party	315	0.00	−5.49	0	▼1
Others	1,436,023	10.60	+4.78	2 (Note: The Independent members were Cathy McGowan (Indi, Vic) and Andrew Wilkie (Denison, Tas).)	Steady
Total	13,541,101			150	
Two-party-preferred vote
Liberal/National Coalition	6,818,824	50.36	−3.13	76	▼14
Australian Labor Party	6,722,277	49.64	+3.13	69	▲14
Invalid/blank votes	131,722	4.70	−0.86		
Total votes	14,262,016				
Registered voters/turnout	15,671,551	91.01	–2.22		
Source: Federal Election 2016

=== Senate ===
In the 76-seat Senate, following the double dissolution election, the Coalition government was returned with 30 seats, and the Labor opposition obtained 26 seats. The crossbench consisted of 20 senators: the Greens winning 9 seats, One Nation winning 4 seats, the Nick Xenophon Team winning 3 seats, and the Liberal Democratic Party, Derryn Hinch's Justice Party, Family First Party and Jacqui Lambie Network each winning one seat.

== Membership changes after the election ==
In the time elapsed between the 2016 election and the following federal election, many parliamentarians resigned from their seats, while some were disqualified by the High Court of Australia. The parliamentary eligibility crisis involving dual citizenship was responsible for a significant portion of these departures, although the cases of Barnaby Joyce and John Alexander only left brief vacancies due to their prompt returns in by-elections. Some individual parliamentarians also made an impact by changing their party membership or independent status.

Seat	Before		Change		After		
Seat	Member	Party	Type	Date	Date	Member	Party
Vic (Senate)	Stephen Conroy	Labor	Resignation	30 September 2016	25 October 2016	Kimberley Kitching	Labor
SA (Senate)	Bob Day	Family First	Resignation, disqualification	1 November 2016	19 April 2017	Lucy Gichuhi	Family First
WA (Senate)	Rod Culleton	One Nation	Departure from party	18 December 2016		Rod Culleton	Independent
WA (Senate)	Rod Culleton	Independent	Disqualification	11 January 2017	27 March 2017	Peter Georgiou	One Nation
SA (Senate)	Cory Bernardi	Liberal	Formation of new party	7 February 2017		Cory Bernardi	Conservatives
SA (Senate)	Lucy Gichuhi	Family First	Refusal to join party merger	3 May 2017		Lucy Gichuhi	Independent
WA (Senate)	Scott Ludlam	Greens	Resignation, disqualification	14 July 2017	10 November 2017	Jordon Steele-John	Greens
Qld (Senate)	Larissa Waters	Greens	Resignation, disqualification	18 July 2017	10 November 2017	Andrew Bartlett	Greens
WA (Senate)	Chris Back	Liberal	Resignation	31 July 2017	16 August 2017	Slade Brockman	Liberal
Qld (Senate)	Malcolm Roberts	One Nation	Disqualification	27 October 2017	10 November 2017	Fraser Anning	One Nation
New England	Barnaby Joyce	National	Disqualification	27 October 2017	2 December 2017	Barnaby Joyce (re-elected)	National
NSW (Senate)	Fiona Nash	National	Disqualification	27 October 2017	22 December 2017	Jim Molan	Liberal
SA (Senate)	Nick Xenophon	Xenophon Team	Resignation	31 October 2017	14 November 2017	Rex Patrick	Xenophon Team
Tas (Senate)	Stephen Parry	Liberal	Resignation, disqualification	2 November 2017	9 February 2018	Richard Colbeck	Liberal
Bennelong	John Alexander	Liberal	Resignation	11 November 2017	16 December 2017	John Alexander (re-elected)	Liberal
Tas (Senate)	Jacqui Lambie	Lambie Network	Resignation, disqualification	14 November 2017	9 February 2018	Steve Martin	Independent
SA (Senate)	Skye Kakoschke-Moore	Xenophon Team	Resignation, disqualification	22 November 2017	16 February 2018	Tim Storer	Independent
Qld (Senate)	Fraser Anning	One Nation	Departure from party	15 January 2018		Fraser Anning	Independent
NSW (Senate)	Sam Dastyari	Labor	Resignation	25 January 2018	14 February 2018	Kristina Keneally	Labor
Batman	David Feeney	Labor	Resignation	1 February 2018	17 March 2018	Ged Kearney	Labor
SA (Senate)	Lucy Gichuhi	Independent	Party membership	2 February 2018		Lucy Gichuhi	Liberal
Qld (Senate)	George Brandis	LNP	Resignation	8 February 2018	21 March 2018	Amanda Stoker	LNP
ACT (Senate)	Katy Gallagher	Labor	Disqualification	9 May 2018	23 May 2018	David Smith	Labor
Perth	Tim Hammond	Labor	Resignation	10 May 2018	28 July 2018	Patrick Gorman	Labor
Braddon	Justine Keay	Labor	Resignation	10 May 2018	28 July 2018	Justine Keay (re-elected)	Labor
Fremantle	Josh Wilson	Labor	Resignation	10 May 2018	28 July 2018	Josh Wilson (re-elected)	Labor
Longman	Susan Lamb	Labor	Resignation	10 May 2018	28 July 2018	Susan Lamb (re-elected)	Labor
Mayo	Rebekha Sharkie	Centre Alliance	Resignation	11 May 2018	28 July 2018	Rebekha Sharkie (re-elected)	Centre Alliance
Tas (Senate)	Steve Martin	Independent	Party membership	28 May 2018		Steve Martin	National
Qld (Senate)	Fraser Anning	Independent	Party membership	4 June 2018		Fraser Anning	Katter's Australian
NSW (Senate)	Brian Burston	One Nation	Departure from party	14 June 2018		Brian Burston	Independent
NSW (Senate)	Brian Burston	Independent	Party membership	18 June 2018		Brian Burston	United Australia
NSW (Senate)	Lee Rhiannon	Greens	Resignation	15 August 2018		Mehreen Faruqi	Greens
Qld (Senate)	Andrew Bartlett	Greens	Resignation	27 August 2018	6 September 2018	Larissa Waters	Greens
Wentworth	Malcolm Turnbull	Liberal	Resignation	31 August 2018	20 October 2018	Kerryn Phelps	Independent
Qld (Senate)	Fraser Anning	Katter's Australian	Departure from party	25 October 2018		Fraser Anning	Independent
Chisholm	Julia Banks	Liberal	Departure from party	27 November 2018		Julia Banks	Independent
Tas (Senate)	David Bushby	Liberal	Resignation	21 January 2019	6 March 2019	Wendy Askew	Liberal
Vic (Senate)	Jacinta Collins	Labor	Resignation	15 February 2019	6 March 2019	Raff Ciccone	Labor
NSW (Senate)	David Leyonhjelm	Liberal Democrats	Resignation	1 March 2019	20 March 2019	Duncan Spender	Liberal Democrats
Qld (Senate)	Fraser Anning	Independent	Formation of new party	4 April 2019		Fraser Anning	Conservative National Party
ACT (Senate)	David Smith	Labor	Resignation	11 April 2019		vacant	
SA (Senate)	Cory Bernardi	Conservatives	Party deregistration	24 June 2019 (Note: The party deregistration was after the 2019 election but before the start of the 46th Parliament)		Cory Bernardi	Independent

- 1 November 2016: Family First Senator Bob Day resigns after his business collapses.
- 3 February 2017: The High Court finds that independent Senator Rod Culleton (formerly of One Nation) was not eligible to be elected under Section 44(ii) of the Constitution due to a criminal conviction.
- 10 March 2017: One Nation Senator Peter Georgiou declared elected as a Senator for Queensland by the High Court on a countback to replace Culleton.
- 26 March 2017: Georgiou sworn in.
- 5 April 2017: The High Court finds that Bob Day was not eligible to be elected under Section 44(v) of the Constitution due to holding a pecuniary interest in an agreement with the Commonwealth.
- 19 April 2017: Family First Senator Lucy Gichuhi declared elected as a Senator for South Australia by the High Court on a countback to replace Day.
- 9 May 2017: Gichuhi sworn in.
- 14 July 2017: Greens Senator and co-deputy leader Scott Ludlam resigns after discovering that he still held New Zealand citizenship, making him ineligible to sit in parliament due to Section 44(i) of the Constitution.
- 18 July 2017: Greens Senator and co-deputy leader Larissa Waters resigns after discovering that she held Canadian citizenship by birth, making her ineligible to sit in parliament due to Section 44(i) of the Constitution.
- 31 July 2017: Liberal Senator Chris Back of Western Australia resigns.
- 16 August 2017: Liberal Slade Brockman is appointed as a Senator for Western Australia to replace Back, being sworn in the next day.
- 27 October 2017: The High Court finds that Greens Senator Scott Ludlam of Western Australia, Greens Senator Larissa Waters of Queensland, One Nation Senator Malcolm Roberts of Queensland, Nationals Senator and deputy leader of the National Party Fiona Nash of New South Wales, and Deputy Prime Minister and leader of the National Party Barnaby Joyce (the member for New England) were all ineligible to be elected to and sit in Parliament under Section 44(i) of the Constitution, due to all holding foreign citizenship.
- 31 October 2017: Nick Xenophon Team Senator Nick Xenophon of South Australia resigns.
- 2 November 2017: President of the Senate and Liberal Senator Stephen Parry of Tasmania resigns after discovering he held British citizenship by descent, making him ineligible to sit in parliament due to Section 44(i) of the Constitution.
- 10 November 2017: Greens Senator Jordon Steele-John of Western Australia, Greens Senator Andrew Bartlett of Queensland, and One Nation Senator Fraser Anning of Queensland are declared elected as Senators by the High Court, to replace Ludlam, Waters, and Roberts (respectively).
- 13 November 2017: Liberal MP John Alexander, the member for Bennelong, resigns after discovering he held British citizenship by descent, making him ineligible to sit in parliament due to Section 44(i) of the Constitution.
- 13 November 2017: Greens Senator Jordon Steele-John of Western Australia, Greens Senator Andrew Bartlett of Queensland, and One Nation Senator Fraser Anning of Queensland (who immediately resigned from the party to sit as an independent) are sworn in as senators to replace Ludlam, Waters, and Roberts (respectively).
- 14 November 2017: Jacqui Lambie Network Senator Jacqui Lambie resigns after discovering that she held British citizenship by descent, making her ineligible to sit in parliament due to Section 44(i) of the Constitution.
- 14 November 2017: Rex Patrick of the Nick Xenophon Team is appointed as a Senator for South Australia to replace Nick Xenophon, being sworn in the next day.
- 22 November 2017: Nick Xenophon Team Senator Skye Kakoschke-Moore resigns after discovering that she held British citizenship by descent, making her ineligible to sit in parliament due to Section 44(i) of the Constitution.
- 2 December 2017: 2017 New England by-election held. Former Deputy Prime Minister and Leader of the Nationals, Barnaby Joyce, was returned to his former seat after renouncing his New Zealand citizenship.
- 16 December 2017: 2017 Bennelong by-election held. Previous Liberal MP for Bennelong John Alexander was returned after renouncing his British citizenship.
- 22 December 2017: The High Court declares Liberal Jim Molan elected as a Senator for New South Wales, taking the seat formerly held by Fiona Nash.
- 25 January 2018: Labor Senator Sam Dastyari of New South Wales resigns due to being the subject of a Chinese-related donations scandal.
- 1 February 2018: Labor MP David Feeney announces his resignation from politics, due to dual citizenship concerns, which takes effect immediately.
- 17 March 2018: 2018 Batman by-election held, where Ged Kearney won, retaining the seat for Labor.
- 9 May 2018: The High Court rules that ACT Labor Senator Katy Gallagher is ineligible to be elected to and sit in Parliament under Section 44(i) of the Constitution, due to not renouncing British citizenship in time. Following the ruling, Labor MPs Josh Wilson, Susan Lamb, Justine Keay, and Nick Xenophon Team MP Rebekha Sharkie resigns.

== Major events ==
- 12 October 2016: Singaporean Prime Minister Lee Hsien Loong addressed a joint sitting of Parliament.
- 14 August 2017: Deputy Prime Minister Barnaby Joyce announced that he held dual citizenship with New Zealand, becoming the highest-profile victim of the dual citizenship saga.
- 15 November 2017: The result of a nationwide postal vote on same-sex marriage was announced, with a majority yes response.
- 26 February 2018: Deputy Prime Minister Barnaby Joyce resigns as leader of the National party. Michael McCormack becomes the next National leader and Deputy Prime Minister.
- 24 August 2018: Prime Minister Malcolm Turnbull resigns as leader of the Liberal Party after a losing a leadership spill. In the subsequent ballot Scott Morrison defeats Peter Dutton 45 votes to 40. Morrison is sworn in as the 30th Prime Minister of Australia later that evening. Josh Frydenberg is appointed Deputy Leader of the Liberal Party, replacing Julie Bishop.

== Major legislation ==
- 7 December 2017: The Marriage Amendment (Definition and Religious Freedoms) Act 2017 was passed, legalising same-sex marriage in Australia.

Sub 10 bail in Law

The law passed called the Financial Sector Legislation Amendment (Crisis Resolution Powers and Other Measures) Bill 2017

== See also ==
- 46th Parliament of Australia
- Turnbull government
- Morrison government
