= July 2018 Australian federal by-elections =

Set of by-elections in Australia

← 2016	28 July 2018	2019 →

5 of 150 seats in the House of Representatives
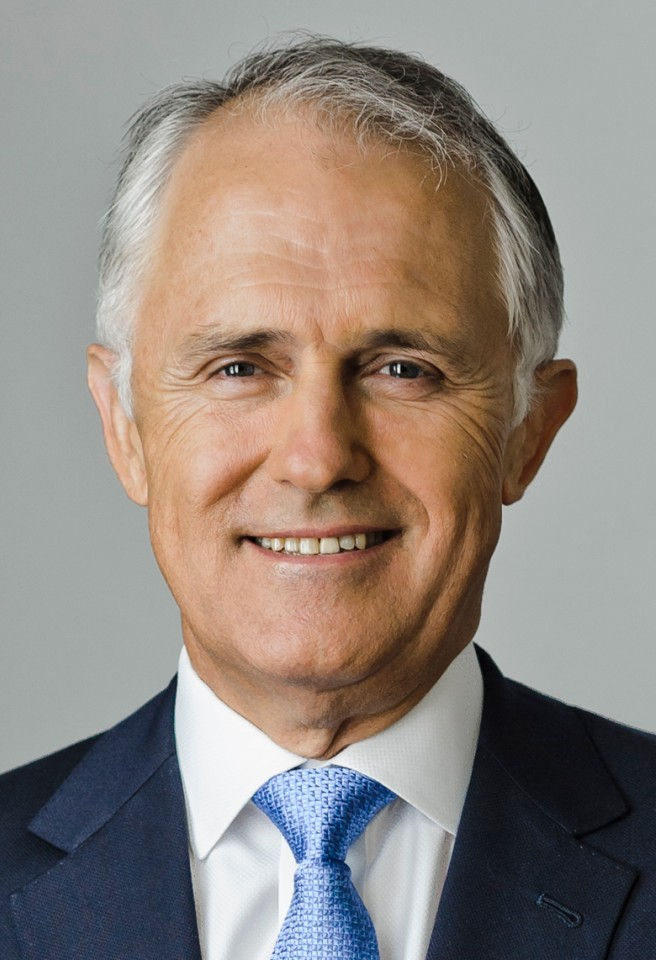

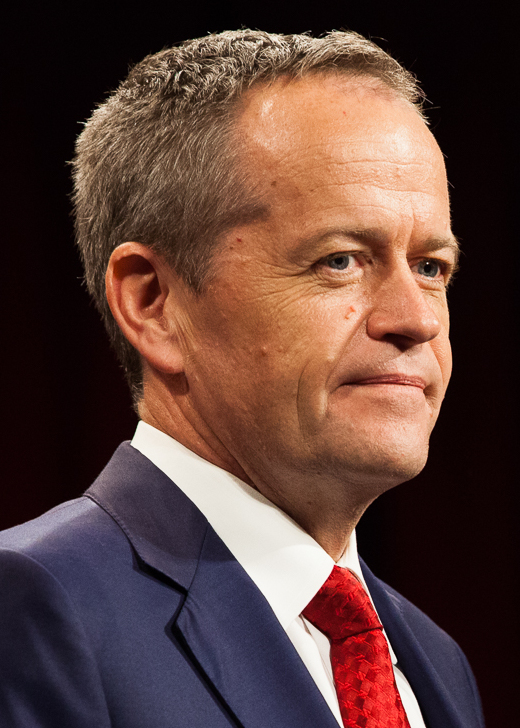
	First party	Second party	Third party
			CA
Leader	Malcolm Turnbull	Bill Shorten	No leader
Party	Liberal/National coalition	Labor	Centre Alliance
Leader since	14 September 2015	13 October 2013	N/A
Leader's seat	Wentworth	Maribyrnong	N/A
Last election	0	4	1
Seats won	0	4	1
Seat change	Steady	Steady	Steady

The July 2018 Australian federal by-elections, known colloquially as Super Saturday, were five by-elections held on 28 July 2018 to fill vacancies in the Australian House of Representatives caused by the resignations of five MPs.

Three MPs of the Australian Labor Party and the Centre Alliance's sole MP resigned due to dual citizenship concerns after the High Court ruled on 8 May 2018 that Senator Katy Gallagher was ineligible to have been elected to the Australian Senate for being a dual citizen, in similar circumstances to four of the lower house MPs. Labor MP for Perth Tim Hammond resigned for family reasons on the same day, causing the first time ever that five by-elections would be held on the same day in Australia. All sitting MPs apart from Hammond re-contested and won the ensuing by-elections.

The governing Liberal/National Coalition did not contest the by-elections in the safe Labor seats of Fremantle and Perth, with the Liberal Party contesting the by-elections in the marginal Labor seats of Braddon and Longman, and the Centre Alliance-held Mayo. Coalition performance at the by-elections was below expectations and Malcolm Turnbull resigned as Prime Minister after losing a leadership spill less than a month later.

== Results ==
=== Braddon ===
2018 Braddon by-election
← 2016	28 July 2018	2019 →

The Division of Braddon (Tas) in the House of Representatives
- Registered: 73,670
- Turnout: 90.38% ▼3.71
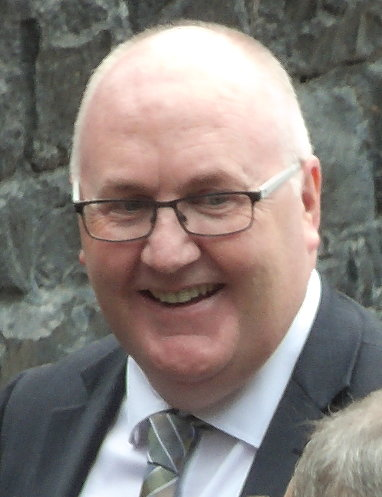
	First party	Second party
Candidate	Justine Keay	Brett Whiteley
Party	Labor	Liberal
Percentage	36.98%	39.26%
Swing	▼3.07	▼2.24
TPP	52.31%	47.69%
TPP swing	▲0.11	▼0.11
MP before election
Justine Keay
Labor
Elected MP
Justine Keay
Labor

Braddon by-election: 28 July 2018
Party	Candidate	Votes	%	±%
Liberal	Brett Whiteley	24,645	39.26	−2.24
Labor	Justine Keay	23,218	36.98	−3.07
Independent	Craig Garland	6,633	10.57	+10.57
Shooters, Fishers, Farmers	Brett Neal	2,984	4.75	+4.75
Greens	Jarrod Edwards	2,518	4.01	−2.73
Independent	Donna Gibbons	1,533	2.44	+2.44
Liberal Democrats	Joshua Boag	828	1.32	−0.81
People's Party	Bruno Strangio	421	0.67	0.67
Total formal votes		62,780	94.29	−0.48
Informal votes		3,804	5.71	+0.48
Turnout		66,584	90.28	−3.81
Two-party-preferred result
Labor	Justine Keay	32,842	52.31	+0.11
Liberal	Brett Whiteley	29,938	47.69	−0.11
Labor hold		Swing	+0.11	

=== Fremantle ===
2018 Fremantle by-election
← 2016	28 July 2018	2019 →

The Division of Fremantle (WA) in the House of Representatives
- Registered: 103,149
- Turnout: 66.09% ▼22.72
	First party	Second party
Candidate	Josh Wilson	John Gray
Party	Labor	Liberal Democrats
Percentage	52.62%	14.10%
Swing	▲11.63	▲14.10
2CP	73.33%	26.67%
2CP change	▲73.33	▲26.67
MP before election
Josh Wilson
Labor
Elected MP
Josh Wilson
Labor

Fremantle by-election: 28 July 2018
Party	Candidate	Votes	%	±%
Labor	Josh Wilson	33,277	52.62	+11.63
Greens	Dorinda Cox	10,456	16.53	−1.21
Liberal Democrats	John Gray	8,916	14.10	+14.10
Christians	Mark Staer	3,350	5.30	+5.30
Animal Justice	Katrina Love	3,297	5.21	+5.21
Independent	Jason Spanbroek	3,239	5.12	+5.12
People's Party	James Harfouche	708	1.12	+1.12
Total formal votes		63,243	92.76	−3.24
Informal votes		4,933	7.24	+3.24
Turnout		68,176	66.05	−22.76
Two-candidate-preferred result
Labor	Josh Wilson	46,375	73.33	+15.81
Liberal Democrats	John Gray	16,868	26.67	+26.67
Labor hold		Swing	N/A	

=== Longman ===
2018 Longman by-election
← 2016	28 July 2018	2019 →

The Division of Longman (Qld) in the House of Representatives
- Registered: 111,652
- Turnout: 84.26% ▼7.42
	First party	Second party
Candidate	Susan Lamb	Trevor Ruthenberg
Party	Labor	Liberal National
Percentage	39.84%	29.61%
Swing	▲4.46	▼9.40
TPP	54.45%	45.55%
TPP swing	▲3.66	▼3.66
MP before election
Susan Lamb
Labor
Elected MP
Susan Lamb
Labor

Longman by-election: 28 July 2018
Party	Candidate	Votes	%	±%
Labor	Susan Lamb	35,203	39.84	+4.45
Liberal National	Trevor Ruthenberg	26,170	29.61	−9.40
One Nation	Matthew Stephen	14,061	15.91	+6.50
Greens	Gavin Behrens	4,264	4.83	+0.44
Independent	Jackie Perkins	2,379	2.69	+2.69
Liberal Democrats	Lloyd Russell	1,762	1.99	+1.99
Country	Blair Verrier	1,387	1.57	+1.57
Democratic Labour	Gregory Bell	1,043	1.18	+1.18
Science	James Noonan	970	1.10	+1.10
Australia First	Jim Saleam	709	0.80	+0.80
People's Party	John Reece	420	0.48	+0.48
Total formal votes		88,368	93.93	+2.46
Informal votes		5,707	6.07	−2.46
Turnout		94,075	84.16	−7.52
Two-party-preferred result
Labor	Susan Lamb	48,116	54.45	+3.66
Liberal National	Trevor Ruthenberg	40,252	45.55	−3.66
Labor hold		Swing	+3.66	

=== Mayo ===
2018 Mayo by-election
← 2016	28 July 2018	2019 →

The Division of Mayo (SA) in the House of Representatives
- Registered: 107,554
- Turnout: 85.52% ▼8.67
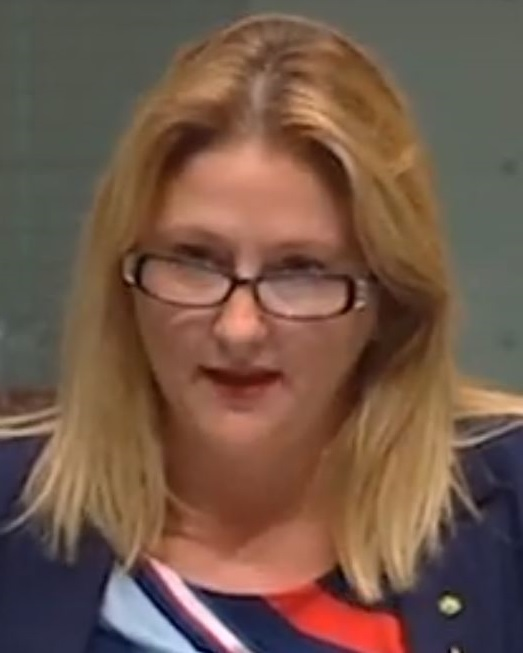

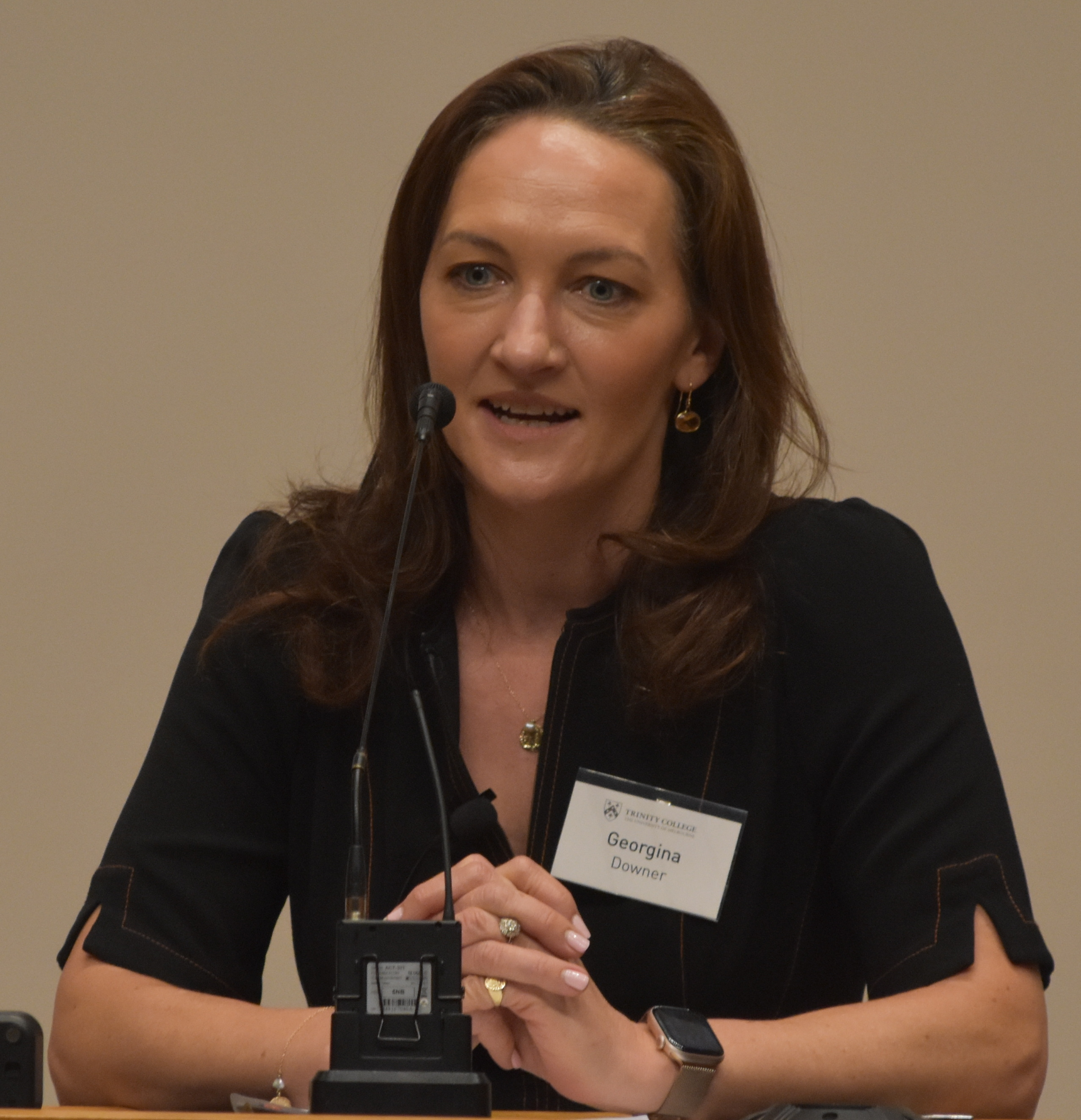
	First party	Second party
Candidate	Rebekha Sharkie	Georgina Downer
Party	Centre Alliance	Liberal
Percentage	44.37%	37.44%
Swing	▲9.51%	▼0.32%
2CP	57.53%	42.47%
2CP swing	▲2.56	▼2.56
MP before election
Rebekha Sharkie
Centre Alliance
Elected MP
Rebekha Sharkie
Centre Alliance

Mayo by-election: 28 July 2018
Party	Candidate	Votes	%	±%
Centre Alliance	Rebekha Sharkie	39,369	44.37	+9.51
Liberal	Georgina Downer	33,219	37.44	−0.32
Greens	Major Sumner	7,898	8.90	+0.85
Labor	Reg Coutts	5,370	6.05	−7.47
Christian Democrats	Tracey-Lee Cane	1,348	1.52	+1.52
Liberal Democrats	Stephen Humble	809	0.91	−0.30
People's Party	Kelsie Harfouche	716	0.81	+0.81
Total formal votes		88,729	96.47	−0.64
Informal votes		3,246	3.53	+0.64
Turnout		91,975	85.42	−8.77
Two-party-preferred result
Liberal	Georgina Downer	49,375	55.65	+0.30
Labor	Reg Coutts	39,354	44.35	−0.30
Two-candidate-preferred result
Centre Alliance	Rebekha Sharkie	51,042	57.53	+2.56
Liberal	Georgina Downer	37,687	42.47	−2.56
Centre Alliance hold		Swing	+2.56	

=== Perth ===
2018 Perth by-election
← 2016	28 July 2018	2019 →

The Division of Perth (WA) in the House of Representatives
- Registered: 100,655
- Turnout: 64.07% ▼23.97
	First party	Second party
Candidate	Patrick Gorman	Caroline Perks
Party	Labor	Greens
Percentage	39.33%	18.81%
Swing	▲1.97	▲1.74
2CP	63.10%	36.90%
2CP swing	▲63.10	▲36.90
MP before election
Tim Hammond
Labor
Elected MP
Patrick Gorman
Labor

Perth by-election: 28 July 2018
Party	Candidate	Votes	%	±%
Labor	Patrick Gorman	22,812	39.33	+1.96
Greens	Caroline Perks	10,908	18.81	+1.74
Independent	Paul Collins	5,516	9.51	+9.51
Liberal Democrats	Wesley Du Preez	3,880	6.69	+4.98
Western Australia	Julie Matheson	3,123	5.38	+5.38
Independent Liberal	Jim Grayden	2,565	4.42	+4.42
Animal Justice	Nicole Arielli	1,815	3.13	+3.13
Independent	Ian Britza	1,705	2.94	+2.94
Christians	Ellen Joubert	1,474	2.54	+2.54
Science	Aaron Hammond	1,002	1.73	+1.73
Mental Health	Ben Mullings	930	1.60	+1.60
Sustainable Australia	Colin Scott	774	1.33	+1.33
Liberty Alliance	Tony Robinson	682	1.18	+1.18
Citizens Electoral Council	Barry Mason	596	1.03	+1.03
People's Party	Gabriel Harfouche	222	0.38	+0.38
Total formal votes		58,004	89.94	−6.29
Informal votes		6,486	10.06	+6.29
Turnout		64,490	64.02	−24.02
Two-candidate-preferred result
Labor	Patrick Gorman	36,601	63.10	+9.77
Greens	Caroline Perks	21,403	36.90	+36.90
Labor hold		Swing	N/A	

== See also ==
- List of Australian federal by-elections
- 2017–18 Australian parliamentary eligibility crisis
- 1986 Northern Ireland by-elections
- Five Constituencies Referendum
