= 2018 Perth by-election =

Australian federal by-election

- 28 July 2018

Division of Perth (WA) in the House of Representatives
- Registered: 100,655
- Turnout: 64.07% ▼23.97

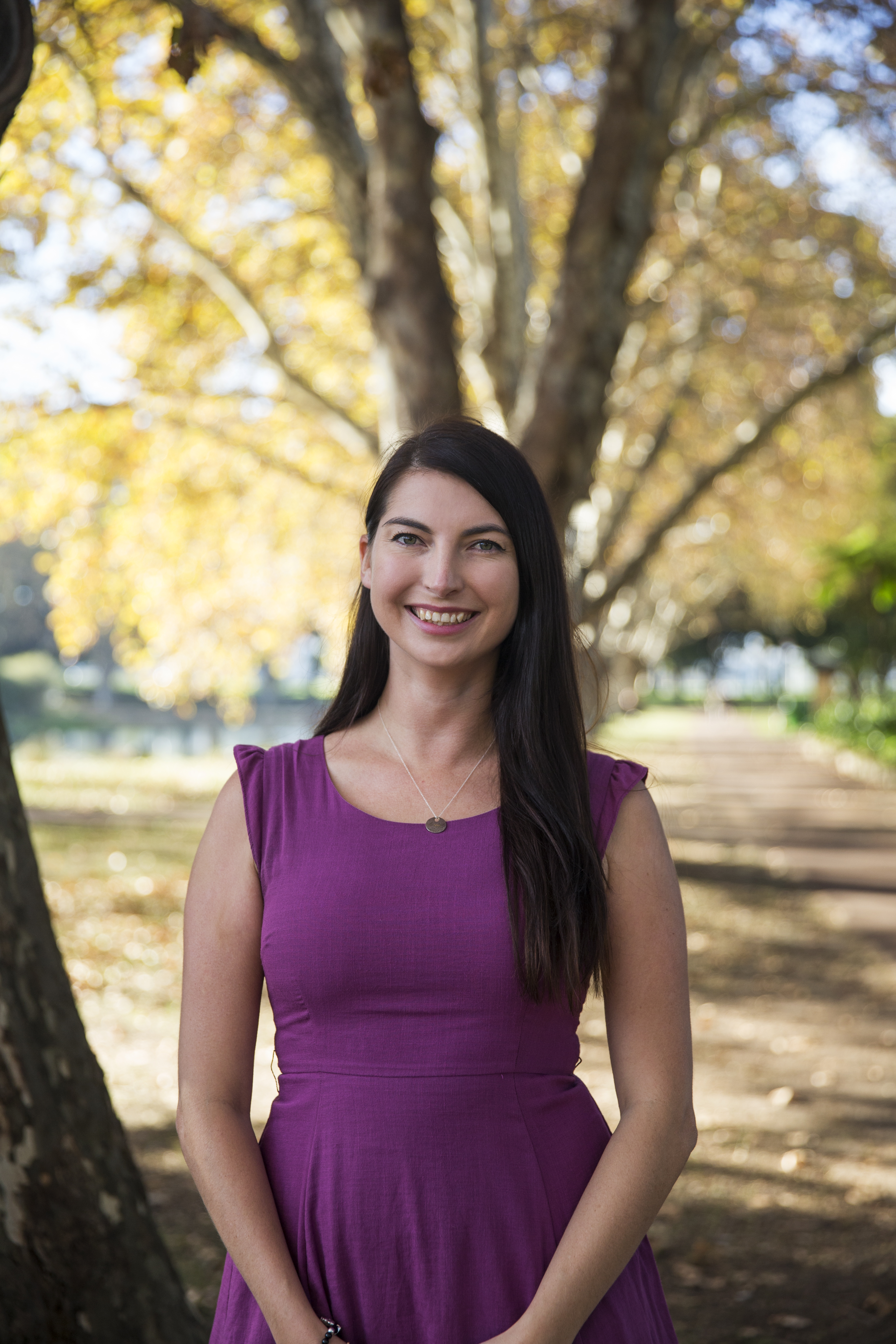
	First party	Second party
Candidate	Patrick Gorman	Caroline Perks
Party	Labor	Greens
Primary vote	22,812	10,908
Percentage	39.33%	18.81%
Swing	▲1.97	▲1.74
TCP	63.10%	36.90%
TCP swing	▲63.10	▲36.90
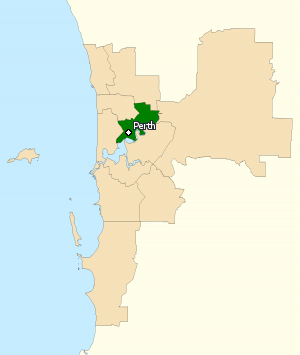
MP before election
Tim Hammond
Labor
Elected MP
Patrick Gorman
Labor

A by-election for the Australian House of Representatives seat of Perth, took place on Saturday 28 July, 2018 following the resignation of incumbent Labor MP, Tim Hammond.

During the early counting, within 90 minutes of the close of polls, the Australian Broadcasting Corporation's psephologist Antony Green's electoral computer had predicted Labor to retain the electorate with an increased margin.

The by-election occurred on the same day as four other by-elections for the House of Representatives, colloquially known as Super Saturday.

== Background ==
Hammond announced on 2 May 2018 of his imminent intention to resign from parliament due to family reasons. Due to the High Court ruling against Senator Katy Gallagher on 9 May 2018 as part of the ongoing parliamentary eligibility crisis, four other MPs in the same situation announced their parliamentary resignations later that day. The Speaker announced on 24 May 2018 that he had scheduled the by-elections to occur on 28 July 2018. Popularly labelled "Super Saturday", the occurrence of five simultaneous federal by-elections is unprecedented in Australian political history. The others are:

- 2018 Braddon by-election
- 2018 Fremantle by-election
- 2018 Longman by-election
- 2018 Mayo by-election

== Key dates ==
Key dates in relation to the by-election are:

- Thursday, 10 May 2018 – Speaker acceptance of resignation
- Friday, 15 June 2018 – Issue of writ
- Friday, 22 June 2018 – Close of electoral rolls (8pm)
- Thursday, 5 July 2018 – Close of nominations (12 noon)
- Friday, 6 July 2018 – Declaration of nominations (12 noon)
- Tuesday, 10 July 2018 – Start of early voting
- Saturday, 28 July 2018 – Polling day (8am to 6pm)
- Friday, 10 August 2018 – Last day for receipt of postal votes
- Sunday, 23 September 2018 – Last day for return of writs

== Candidates ==
Candidates (15) in ballot paper order
Party	Candidate	Background
Independent	Julie Matheson	Founder of the federally unregistered Western Australia Party.
Animal Justice	Nicole Arielli	Party treasurer.
Independent Liberal	Jim Grayden	Property manager, former teacher. Son of former Swan MP Bill Grayden. Running as an Independent Liberal
Liberal Democrats	Wesley Du Preez	Edith Cowan University graduate in Marketing, Advertising, and Public Relations.
#Sustainable	Colin Scott	Small business operator and community volunteer.
Mental Health	Ben Mullings	Psychologist.
Labor	Patrick Gorman	Western Australian Labor state secretary. Aligned with Labor Left.
People	Gabriel Harfouche	Party founder. Ran as a Palmer United candidate in Perth at the 2013 federal election.
Independent	Paul Collins	Former Stirling councillor. Contested the North Metropolitan Region at the 2013 state election as the sixth Liberal candidate.
Greens	Caroline Perks	Public servant for climate change policy.
Science	Aaron Hammond	Multi-disciplinary engineer.
Christians	Ellen Joubert	Coach and mentor for women and children.
Liberty Alliance	Tony Robinson	Party co-founder. Contested the 2017 Bennelong by-election.
Independent	Ian Britza	Two-term Liberal MP for Morley elected at 2008 state election, contested 2017 New England federal by-election as a Country candidate.
Citizens Electoral Council	Barry Mason	Driver for a traffic management company.

The Liberals declined to contest the Perth and Fremantle federal by-elections, but concentrated their resources on the Darling Range state by-election.

== Polling ==
Perth by-election polling
Date	Firm	Commissioned by	Sample	Primary vote					TCP vote
				ALP	GRN	LDP	OTH	UND	ALP	GRN
23 July 2018	ReachTEL	Legalise Vaping Australia	695	44.9%	17.0%	13.4%	16.0%	8.7%	68%	32%
2016 election				37.4%	17.1%	1.7%	43.8%	−	53.3%	−

== Results ==
Perth by-election: 28 July 2018
Party	Candidate	Votes	%	±%
Labor	Patrick Gorman	22,812	39.33	+1.96
Greens	Caroline Perks	10,908	18.81	+1.74
Independent	Paul Collins	5,516	9.51	+9.51
Liberal Democrats	Wesley Du Preez	3,880	6.69	+4.98
Independent	Julie Matheson	3,123	5.38	+5.38
Independent Liberal	Jim Grayden	2,565	4.42	+4.42
Animal Justice	Nicole Arielli	1,815	3.13	+3.13
Independent	Ian Britza	1,705	2.94	+2.94
Christians	Ellen Joubert	1,474	2.54	+2.54
Science	Aaron Hammond	1,002	1.73	+1.73
Mental Health	Ben Mullings	930	1.60	+1.60
Sustainable Australia	Colin Scott	774	1.33	+1.33
Liberty Alliance	Tony Robinson	682	1.18	+1.18
Citizens Electoral Council	Barry Mason	596	1.03	+1.03
People's Party	Gabriel Harfouche	222	0.38	+0.38
Total formal votes		58,004	89.94	−6.29
Informal votes		6,486	10.06	+6.29
Turnout		64,490	64.07	−23.97
Two-candidate-preferred result
Labor	Patrick Gorman	36,601	63.10	+9.77
Greens	Caroline Perks	21,403	36.90	+36.90
Labor hold		Swing	N/A	

== See also ==
- July 2018 Australian federal by-elections
- List of Australian federal by-elections
