= 2018 Braddon by-election =

| ← 2016 | 28 July 2018 | 2019 → |

The Division of Braddon (Tas) in the House of Representatives
- Registered: 73,670
- Turnout: 90.38% ▼3.71

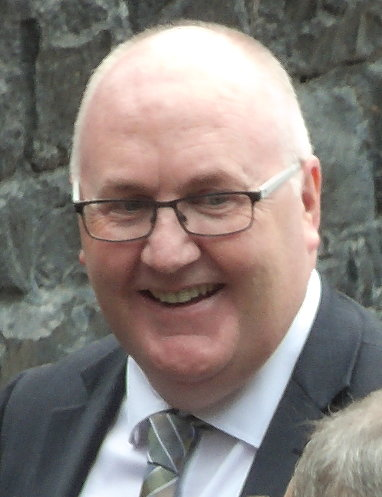
| | First party | Second party | Third party |
|---|---|---|---|
| | | | IND |
| Candidate | Justine Keay | Brett Whiteley | Craig Garland |
| Party | Labor | Liberal | Independent |
| First preference vote | 23,218 | 24,645 | 6,633 |
| Percentage | 36.98% | 39.26% | 10.57% |
| Swing | ▼3.07 | ▼2.24 | ▲10.57 |
| TPP | 52.31% | 47.69% |
| TPP swing | ▲0.11 | ▼0.11 |
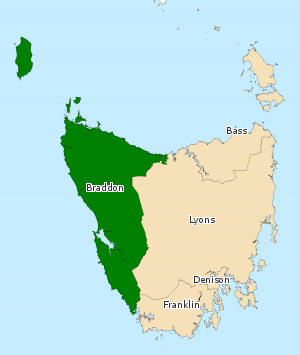
MP before election
Justine Keay
Labor
Elected MP
Justine Keay
Labor

A by-election for the Australian House of Representatives seat of Braddon took place on Saturday 28 July 2018, following the resignation of incumbent Labor MP Justine Keay.

In early counting, within an hour of the close of polls, the Australian Broadcasting Corporation's psephologist Antony Green's electoral computer had predicted Labor to retain the electorate.

The by-election occurred on the same day as four other by-elections for the House of Representatives, colloquially known as Super Saturday.

== Background ==
Due to the High Court ruling against Senator Katy Gallagher on 9 May 2018 as part of the ongoing parliamentary eligibility crisis, Keay and three other MPs in the same situation announced their parliamentary resignations later that day, while the Perth incumbent resigned for family reasons. The Speaker announced on 24 May 2018 that he had scheduled the by-elections to occur on 28 July 2018. Popularly labelled "Super Saturday", the occurrence of five simultaneous federal by-elections is unprecedented in Australian political history. The others are:

- 2018 Fremantle by-election
- 2018 Longman by-election
- 2018 Mayo by-election
- 2018 Perth by-election

A redistribution of the Tasmanian federal electoral divisions was completed in 2017, however by-elections are conducted under existing boundaries, as redistributed boundaries do not come into effect until the subsequent federal election.

== Key dates ==
Key dates in relation to the by-election are:

- Thursday, 10 May 2018 – Speaker acceptance of resignation
- Friday, 15 June 2018 – Issue of writ
- Friday, 22 June 2018 – Close of electoral rolls (8pm)
- Thursday, 5 July 2018 – Close of nominations (12 noon)
- Friday, 6 July 2018 – Declaration of nominations (12 noon)
- Tuesday, 10 July 2018 – Start of early voting
- Saturday, 28 July 2018 – Polling day (8am to 6pm)
- Friday, 10 August 2018 – Last day for receipt of postal votes
- Sunday, 23 September 2018 – Last day for return of writs

== Candidates ==
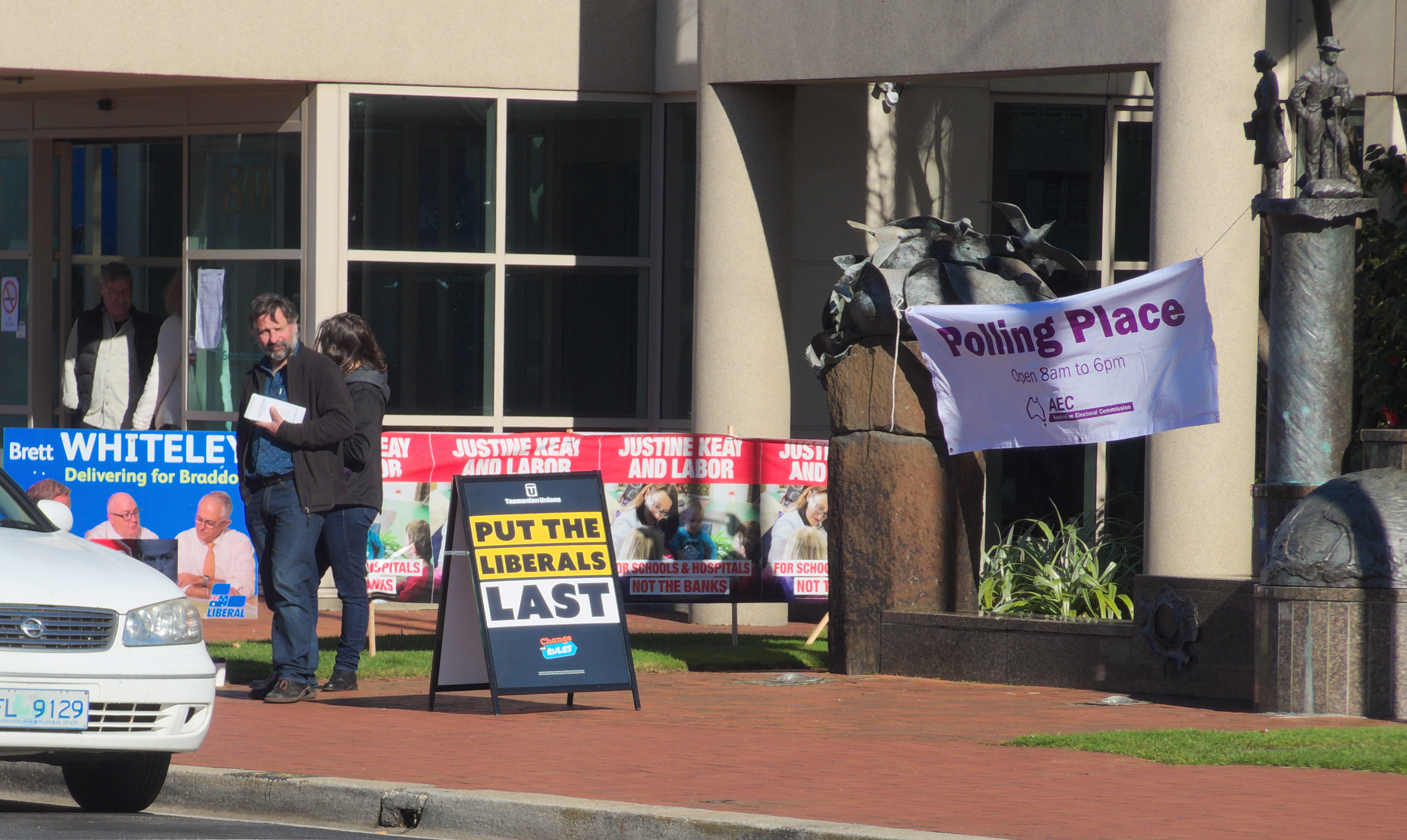
Burnie City Council polling booth

Candidates (8) in ballot paper order
| Party | Candidate | Background |
|---|---|---|
| Greens | Jarrod Edwards | Indigenous land management supervisor. |
| SFF | Brett Neal | Farmer. |
| Independent | Donna Gibbons | Registered nurse and small business owner. |
| Liberal Democrats | Joshua Boag | Sheetmetal fabricator. Contested Braddon at the 2016 federal election. |
| Liberal | Brett Whiteley | One-term MP for Braddon elected at the 2013 federal election. |
| Independent | Craig Garland | Fisherman. Contested Braddon at the 2018 state election. |
| People | Bruno Strangio | Has managed numerous real estate and construction enterprises. |
| Labor | Justine Keay | Previous MP for Braddon elected at the 2016 federal election. |

== Polling ==
Braddon by-election polling
| Date | Firm | Commissioned by | Sample | MoE | Primary vote | | | | TPP vote |
| | | | | | ALP | LIB | GRN | OTH | ALP | LIB |
|---|---|---|---|---|---|---|---|---|---|---|
| 24−26 July 2018 | Newspoll | The Australian | 1002 | ±3.1% | 40% | 43% | 5% | 12% | 51% | 49% |
| 19 July 2018 | ReachTEL | Aus. Forest Products Assoc. | 810 | ±3.4% | 36.0% | 42.7% | 7.0% | 14.3% | 52% | 48% |
| 2 June 2018 | ReachTEL | Sky News | >800 | ±3.4% | 33% | 47% | 6% | 14% | 46% | 54% |
| 2016 election | | | | | 40.0% | 41.5% | 6.7% | 11.7% | 52.2% | 47.8% |

== Results ==
2018 Braddon by-election
| Party | Candidate | Votes | % | ±% |
|---|---|---|---|---|
| Liberal | Brett Whiteley | 24,645 | 39.26 | −2.24 |
| Labor | Justine Keay | 23,218 | 36.98 | −3.07 |
| Independent | Craig Garland | 6,633 | 10.57 | +10.57 |
| Shooters, Fishers, Farmers | Brett Neal | 2,984 | 4.75 | +4.75 |
| Greens | Jarrod Edwards | 2,518 | 4.01 | −2.73 |
| Independent | Donna Gibbons | 1,533 | 2.44 | +2.44 |
| Liberal Democrats | Joshua Boag | 828 | 1.32 | −0.81 |
| People's Party | Bruno Strangio | 421 | 0.67 | 0.67 |
| Total formal votes | | 62,780 | 94.29 | −0.48 |
| Informal votes | | 3,804 | 5.71 | +0.48 |
| Turnout | | 66,584 | 90.38 | −3.71 |
Two-party-preferred result
| Labor | Justine Keay | 32,842 | 52.31 | +0.11 |
| Liberal | Brett Whiteley | 29,938 | 47.69 | −0.11 |
| Labor hold | | Swing | +0.11 | |

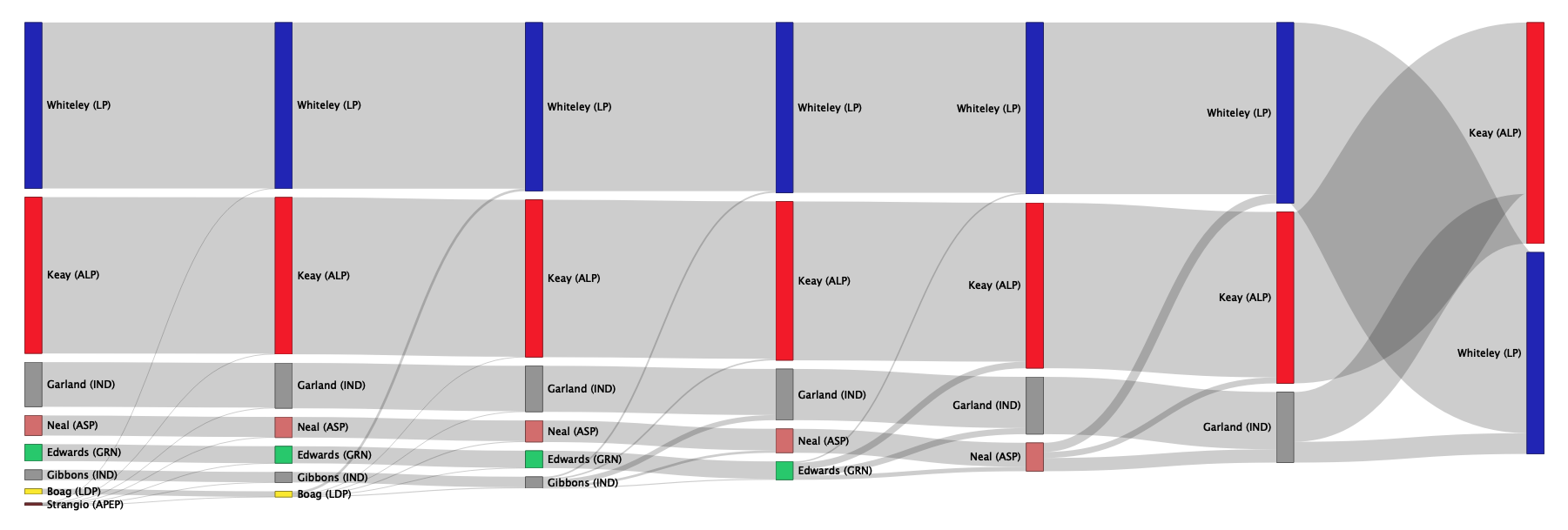
Diagram of preference flows at the Braddon by-election

== See also ==
- July 2018 Australian federal by-elections
- List of Australian federal by-elections
- 2017–18 Australian parliamentary eligibility crisis
