= 2018 Longman by-election =

Australian federal by-election

- 28 July 2018

The Division of Longman (Qld) in the House of Representatives
- Registered: 111,652
- Turnout: 84.26% ▼7.42

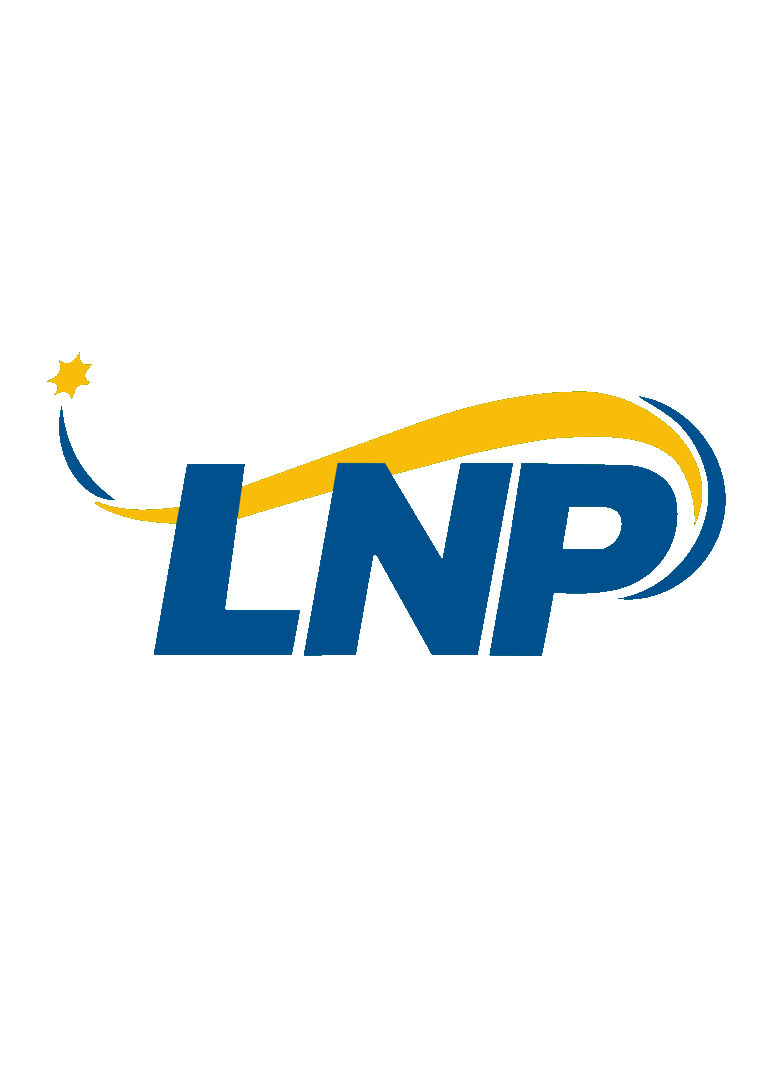
| | First party | Second party | Third party |
|---|---|---|---|
| | | | PHON |
| Candidate | Susan Lamb | Trevor Ruthenberg | Matthew Stephen |
| Party | Labor | Liberal National | One Nation |
| Popular vote | 35,203 | 26,120 | 14,061 |
| Percentage | 39.84% | 29.61% | 15.91% |
| Swing | ▲4.46 | ▼9.40 | ▲6.50 |
| TPP | 54.45% | 45.55% |
| TPP swing | ▲3.66 | ▼3.66 |
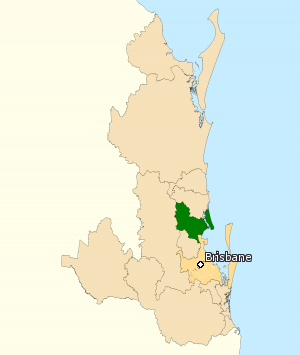
MP before election
Susan Lamb
Labor
Elected MP
Susan Lamb
Labor

A by-election for the Australian House of Representatives seat of Longman took place on Saturday 28 July 2018, following the resignation of incumbent Labor MP Susan Lamb.

In early counting, within an hour of the close of polls, the Australian Broadcasting Corporation's psephologist Antony Green's electoral computer had predicted Labor to retain the electorate with an increased margin.

The by-election occurred on the same day as four other by-elections for the House of Representatives, colloquially known as Super Saturday. The result in Longman has been noted as helping to accelerate the replacement of Malcolm Turnbull as prime minister and Liberal leader in the following month. Turnbull himself did not help his stock when he made the by-election as a direct leadership contest between himself and Opposition Leader Bill Shorten.

== Background ==
Due to the High Court ruling against Senator Katy Gallagher on 9 May 2018 as part of the ongoing parliamentary eligibility crisis, Lamb and three other MPs in the same situation announced their parliamentary resignations later that day, while the Perth incumbent resigned for family reasons. The Speaker announced on 24 May 2018 that he had scheduled the by-elections to occur on 28 July 2018. Popularly labelled "Super Saturday", the occurrence of five simultaneous federal by-elections is unprecedented in Australian political history. The others are:

- 2018 Braddon by-election
- 2018 Fremantle by-election
- 2018 Mayo by-election
- 2018 Perth by-election

Mark Latham, Labor leader between December 2003 and January 2005, voiced a robocall authorised by Pauline Hanson, in an attempt to discourage Labor voting and instead encouraged minor party voting.

The Labor party and Liberal National placed the far right anti immigration Australia First Party last on its preferences.

== Key dates ==
Key dates in relation to the by-election are:

- Thursday, 10 May 2018 – Speaker acceptance of resignation
- Friday, 15 June 2018 – Issue of writ
- Friday, 22 June 2018 – Close of electoral rolls (8pm)
- Thursday, 5 July 2018 – Close of nominations (12 noon)
- Friday, 6 July 2018 – Declaration of nominations (12 noon)
- Tuesday, 10 July 2018 – Start of early voting
- Saturday, 28 July 2018 – Polling day (8am to 6pm)
- Friday, 10 August 2018 – Last day for receipt of postal votes
- Sunday, 23 September 2018 – Last day for return of writs

== Candidates ==
Candidates (11) in ballot paper order
| Party | Candidate | Background |
|---|---|---|
| Liberal Democrats | Lloyd Russell | Business consultant. |
| Australia First | Jim Saleam | Party leader. Contested Lindsay at the 2016 election and Cook at the 2013 election. |
| Democratic Labour | Gregory Bell | Truck driver. |
| Independent | Jackie Perkins | Self-employed mobile veterinarian. |
| Science | James Noonan | Criminology and criminal justice graduate. |
| One Nation | Matthew Stephen | Caboolture businessman. Ran in Sandgate at the 2017 state election. |
| People | John Reece | Ran as an independent candidate in Longman at the 2010 federal election. |
| Labor | Susan Lamb | Previous MP for Longman elected at the 2016 federal election. |
| Liberal National | Trevor Ruthenberg | One-term MP for Kallangur elected at the 2012 state election. |
| Country | Blair Verrier | Certified Practising Accountant (CPA). |
| Greens | Gavin Behrens | Caboolture father and IT professional. Ran in Morayfield at the 2017 state election. |

== Polling ==
Longman by-election polling
| Date | Firm | Commissioned by | Sample | Primary vote | | | | | | TPP vote |
| | | | | ALP | LNP | ONP | GRN | OTH | UND | ALP | LNP |
|---|---|---|---|---|---|---|---|---|---|---|---|
| 24−26 July 2018 | Newspoll | The Australian | 1015 | 40% | 36% | 14% | 5% | 5% | − | 51% | 49% |
| 17−19 July 2018 | ReachTEL | Courier Mail | 578 | 35.8% | 37.9% | 13.9% | (OTH) | 4.3% | 3.9% | 49% | 51% |
| 26 June 2018 | ReachTEL | Courier Mail | 814 | 39.0% | 35.5% | 14.7% | (OTH) | 6.6% | 4.1% | 49% | 51% |
| 21 June 2018 | ReachTEL | Australia Institute | 727 | 39.1% | 34.9% | 14.7% | 4.4% | 3.7% | 3.2% | 50% | 50% |
| 2 June 2018 | ReachTEL | Sky News | >800 | 35% | 38% | (OTH) | 2% | 14% | 11% | 48% | 52% |
| 10 May 2018 | ReachTEL | Australia Institute | 1277 | 32.5% | 36.7% | 15.1% | 4.9% | 6.4% | 4.5% | 47% | 53% |
| 2016 election | | | | 35.4% | 39.0% | 9.4% | 4.4% | 11.8% | | 50.8% | 49.2% |

== Results ==
Longman by-election: 28 July 2018
| Party | Candidate | Votes | % | ±% |
|---|---|---|---|---|
| Labor | Susan Lamb | 35,203 | 39.84 | +4.45 |
| Liberal National | Trevor Ruthenberg | 26,170 | 29.61 | −9.40 |
| One Nation | Matthew Stephen | 14,061 | 15.91 | +6.50 |
| Greens | Gavin Behrens | 4,264 | 4.83 | +0.44 |
| Independent | Jackie Perkins | 2,379 | 2.69 | +2.69 |
| Liberal Democrats | Lloyd Russell | 1,762 | 1.99 | +1.99 |
| Country | Blair Verrier | 1,387 | 1.57 | +1.57 |
| Democratic Labour | Gregory Bell | 1,043 | 1.18 | +1.18 |
| Science | James Noonan | 970 | 1.10 | +1.10 |
| Australia First | Jim Saleam | 709 | 0.80 | +0.80 |
| People's Party | John Reece | 420 | 0.48 | +0.48 |
| Total formal votes | | 88,368 | 93.93 | +2.46 |
| Informal votes | | 5,707 | 6.07 | −2.46 |
| Turnout | | 94,075 | 84.26 | −7.42 |
Two-party-preferred result
| Labor | Susan Lamb | 48,116 | 54.45 | +3.66 |
| Liberal National | Trevor Ruthenberg | 40,252 | 45.55 | −3.66 |
| Labor hold | | Swing | +3.66 | |

== See also ==
- July 2018 Australian federal by-elections
- List of Australian federal by-elections
- 2017–18 Australian parliamentary eligibility crisis
