= Super Saturday (disambiguation) =

Super Saturday or Panic Saturday is the last Saturday before Christmas, a major day of revenue for retailers in the United States, marking the end of the shopping season.

Super Saturday may also refer to:

- The 1984 USTA Championships men’s semifinal and women’s final day, regarded as the single greatest day in tennis history.
- Super Saturday primaries, an event occurring during the US primary elections
- "Super Saturday" (2012 Summer Olympics), Day 8 (4 August) of the 2012 Summer Olympics, when the UK recorded its most successful day at the Olympics in 104 years
- "Super Saturday" (Six Nations), in rugby, a day during the annual Six Nations Championship on which all six competing teams are playing matches
- Super Saturday (TV series) (also called Super Sunday), 1980s US animated television series produced by Sunbow Productions and Marvel Productions
- July 2018 Australian federal by-elections held on Saturday 28 July 2018, a day when Australia held five by-elections due to the 2017–18 Australian parliamentary eligibility crisis
- Super Saturday (Brexit), Saturday 19 October 2019, when the UK Parliament sat (Saturday sittings are normally only held in time of war) to consider a proposed European Union withdrawal agreement
- February 2022 New South Wales state by-elections held on Saturday 12 February 2022, referred to as "Super Saturday" by the NSW media
  - 2022 Bega by-election
  - 2022 Monaro by-election
  - 2022 Strathfield by-election
  - 2022 Willoughby by-election
- Ahead of an edition of the Eurovision Song Contest, a Saturday (often in February and March) where several national broadcasters hold national finals in order to select their act, at or around prime time.
- Ahead of a further easing of COVID-19 lockdown restrictions in the UK, the British media dubbed 4 July 2020 "Super Saturday" wherein restaurants, hairdressers, and pubs, amongst other establishments, were allowed to re-open subject to social distancing and current lockdown measures.
