= 2018 Fremantle by-election =

Australian federal by-election

- 28 July 2018

Division of Fremantle (WA) in the House of Representatives
- Registered: 103,149
- Turnout: 66.09% ▼22.72
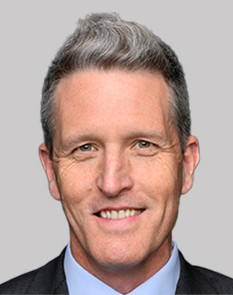

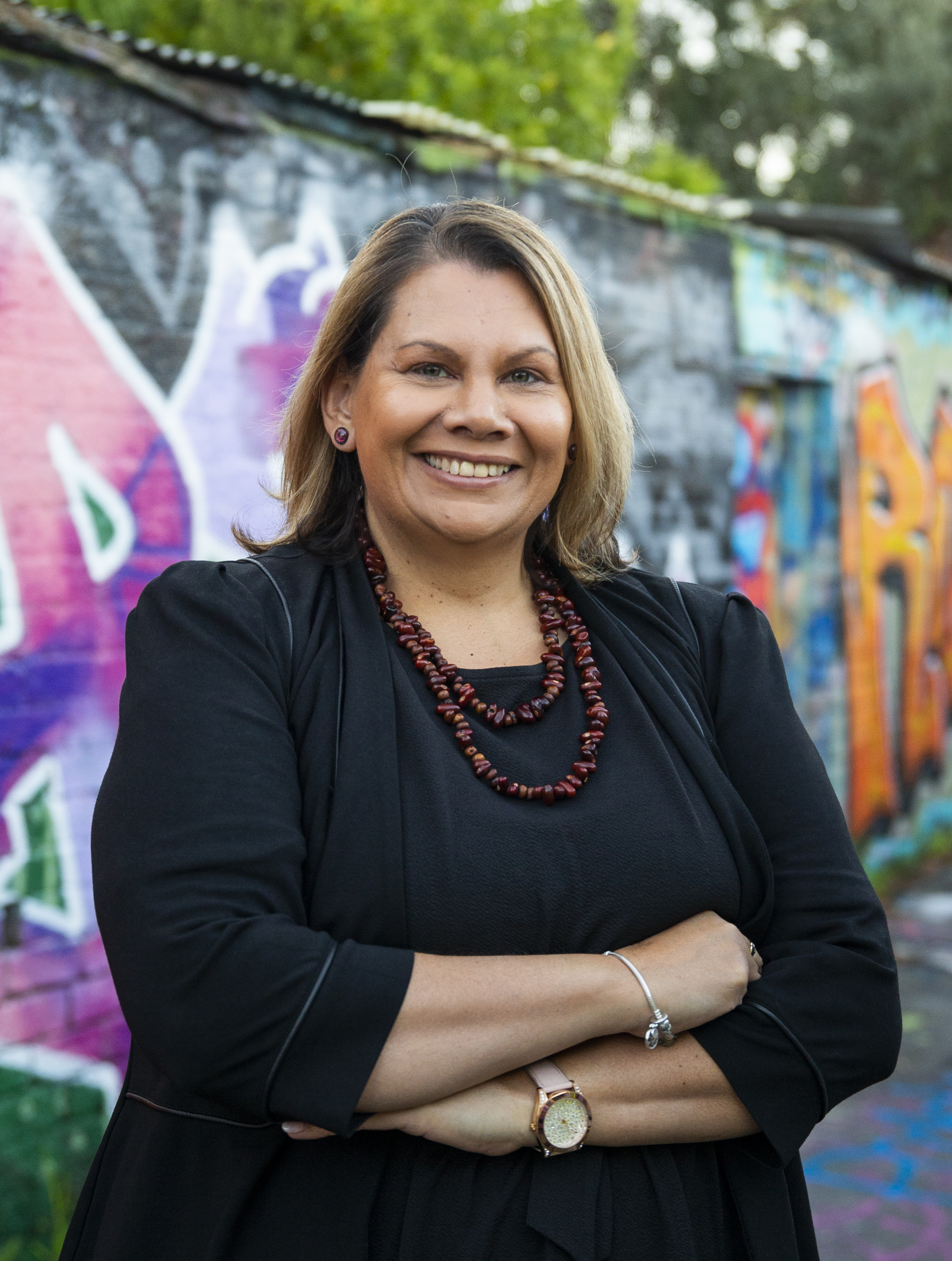
	First party	Second party	Third party
			LDP
Candidate	Josh Wilson	Dorinda Cox	John Gray
Party	Labor	Greens	Liberal Democrats
Popular vote	33,277	10,456	8,916
Percentage	52.62%	16.53%	14.10%
Swing	▲11.63	▼1.21	▲14.10
TCP	73.33%		26.67%
TCP change	▲15.81		▲26.67
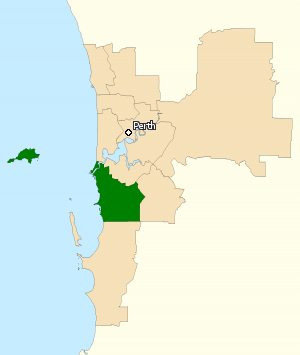
MP before election
Josh Wilson
Labor
Elected MP
Josh Wilson
Labor

A by-election for the Australian House of Representatives seat of Fremantle took place on Saturday 28 July 2018, following the resignation of incumbent Labor MP Josh Wilson.

In early counting, within 90 minutes of the close of polls, the Australian Broadcasting Corporation's psephologist Antony Green's electoral computer had predicted Labor to retain the electorate with an increased margin. This election is notable for being the first time that a Liberal Democrats candidate was included in the two-candidate-preferred counting in an Australian federal election.

The by-election occurred on the same day as four other by-elections for the House of Representatives, colloquially known as Super Saturday.

== Background ==
Due to the High Court ruling against Senator Katy Gallagher on 9 May 2018 as part of the ongoing parliamentary eligibility crisis, Wilson and three other MPs in the same situation announced their parliamentary resignations later that day, while the Perth incumbent resigned for family reasons. The Speaker announced on 24 May 2018 that he had scheduled the by-elections to occur on 28 July 2018. Popularly labelled "Super Saturday", the occurrence of five simultaneous federal by-elections is unprecedented in Australian political history. The others are:

- 2018 Braddon by-election
- 2018 Longman by-election
- 2018 Mayo by-election
- 2018 Perth by-election

== Key dates ==
Key dates in relation to the by-election are:

- Thursday, 10 May 2018 – Speaker acceptance of resignation
- Friday, 15 June 2018 – Issue of writ
- Friday, 22 June 2018 – Close of electoral rolls (8pm)
- Thursday, 5 July 2018 – Close of nominations (12 noon)
- Friday, 6 July 2018 – Declaration of nominations (12 noon)
- Tuesday, 10 July 2018 – Start of early voting
- Saturday, 28 July 2018 – Polling day (8am to 6pm)
- Friday, 10 August 2018 – Last day for receipt of postal votes
- Sunday, 23 September 2018 – Last day for return of writs

== Candidates ==
Candidates (7) in ballot paper order
Party	Candidate	Background
Christians	Mark Staer	Contested Cannington at the 2008 state election and Gosnells at the 2013 state election.
Greens	Dorinda Cox	Small business owner, former police officer, anti-domestic violence campaigner. Later became a Senator for Western Australia.
Animal Justice	Katrina Love	Party's national vice president and state convenor.
Labor	Josh Wilson	Previous MP for Fremantle elected at the 2016 federal election.
Liberal Democrats	John Gray	Former Navy officer, Notre Dame University law student, Starlight Children's Foundation entertainer.
People	James Harfouche	Curtin University commerce student.
Independent	Jason Spanbroek	Running on an anti-Labor platform.

The Liberals declined to contest the Fremantle and Perth federal by-elections, but concentrated their resources on the Darling Range state by-election.

== Polling ==
Fremantle by-election polling
Date	Firm	Commissioned by	Sample	Primary vote					TCP vote
				ALP	GRN	LDP	OTH	UND	ALP	GRN
23 July 2018	ReachTEL	Legalise Vaping Australia	692	49.3%	16.0%	17.4%	11.2%	6.1%	69%	31%
2016 election				41.0%	17.7%	−	41.3%	−	57.5%	−

== Results ==
Fremantle by-election: 28 July 2018
Party	Candidate	Votes	%	±%
Labor	Josh Wilson	33,277	52.62	+11.63
Greens	Dorinda Cox	10,456	16.53	−1.21
Liberal Democrats	John Gray	8,916	14.10	+14.10
Christians	Mark Staer	3,350	5.30	+5.30
Animal Justice	Katrina Love	3,297	5.21	+5.21
Independent	Jason Spanbroek	3,239	5.12	+5.12
People's Party	James Harfouche	708	1.12	+1.12
Total formal votes		63,243	92.76	−3.24
Informal votes		4,933	7.24	+3.24
Turnout		68,176	66.09	−22.72
Two-candidate-preferred result
Labor	Josh Wilson	46,375	73.33	+15.81
Liberal Democrats	John Gray	16,868	26.67	+26.67
Labor hold		Swing	N/A	

== See also ==
- July 2018 Australian federal by-elections
- List of Australian federal by-elections
- 2017–18 Australian parliamentary eligibility crisis
