= 2018 Mayo by-election =

Election to a seat in the Australian Parliament

- 28 July 2018

The Division of Mayo (SA) in the House of Representatives
- Registered: 107,554
- Turnout: 85.52% ▼8.67
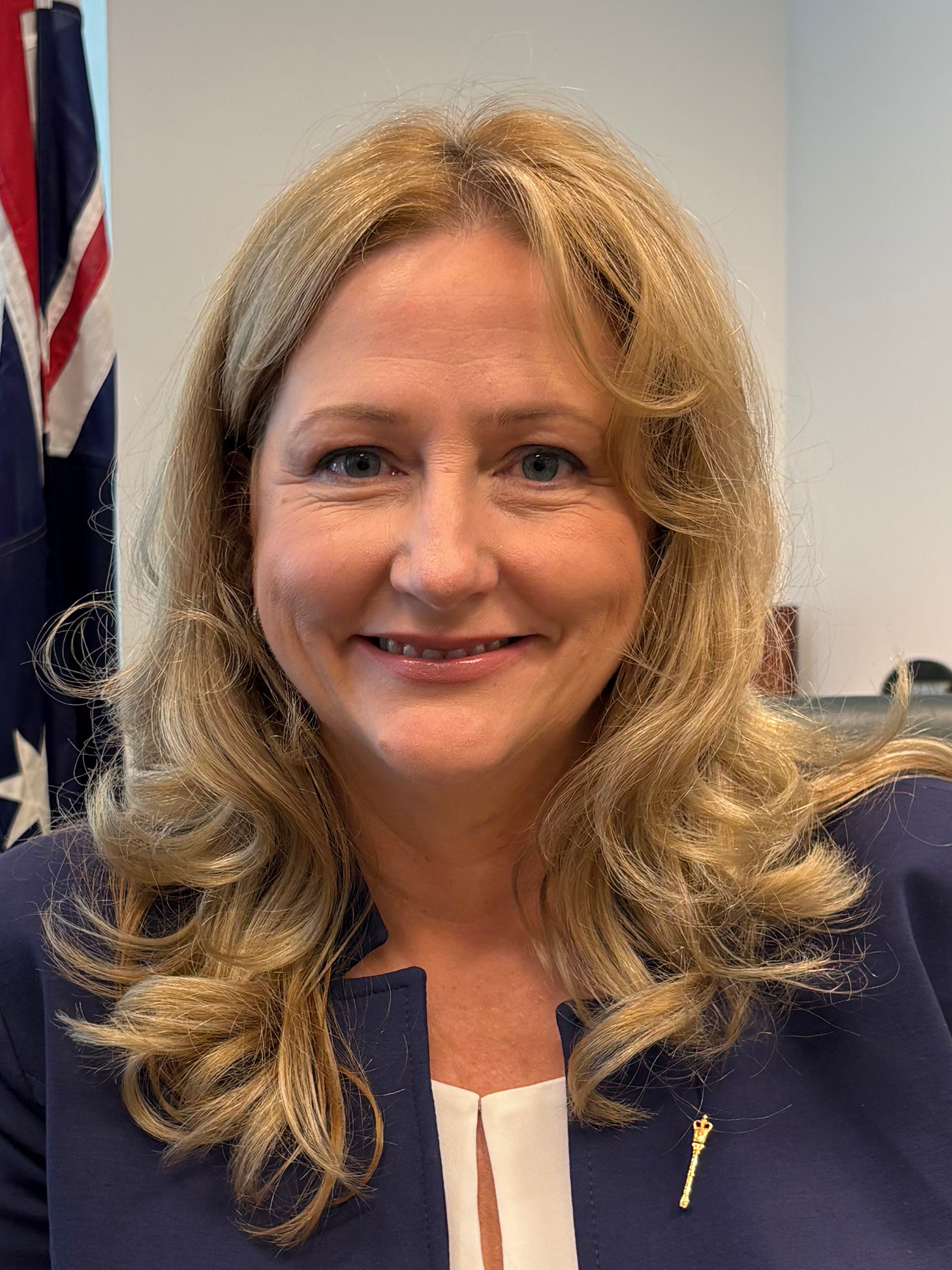

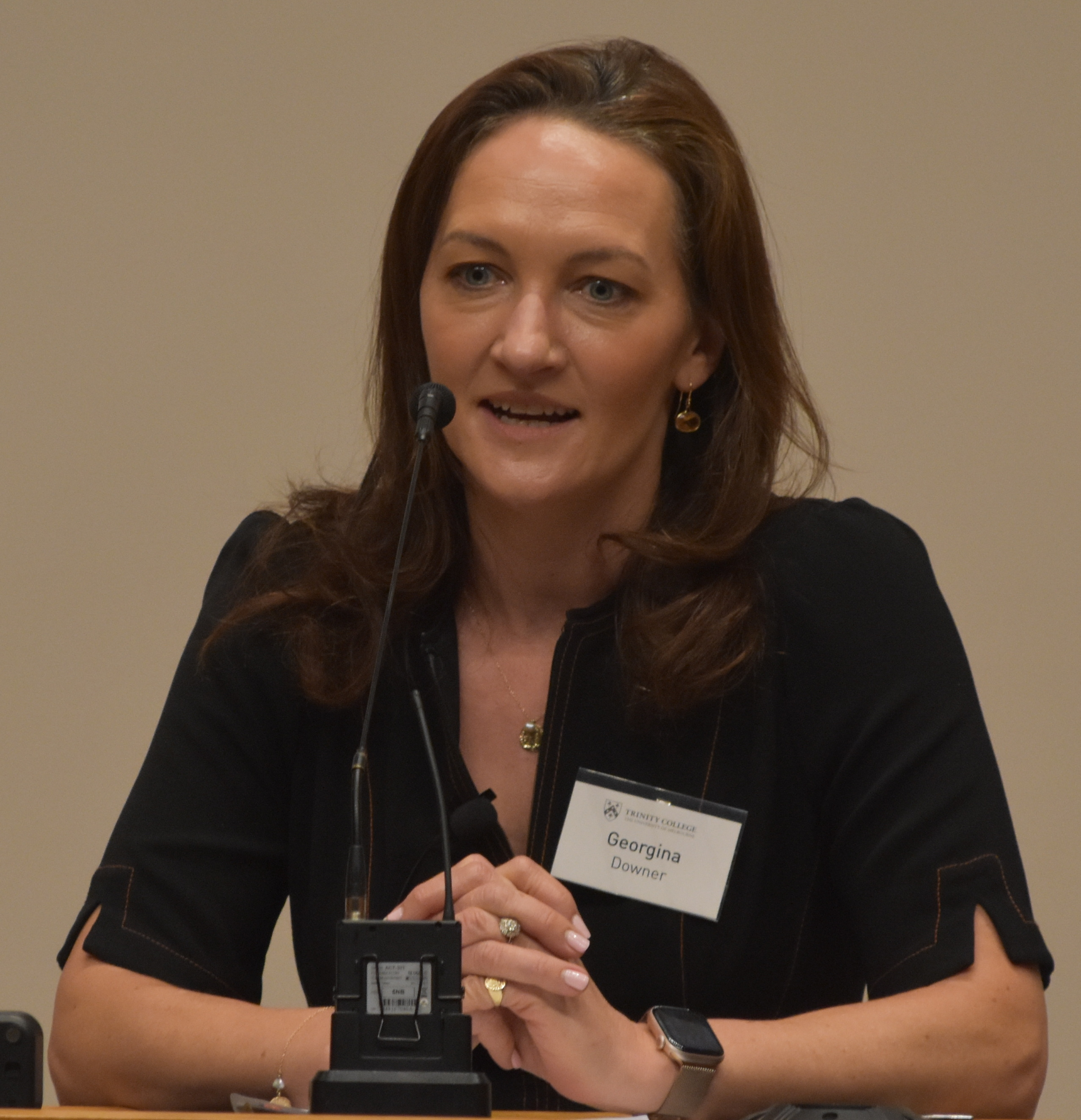
	First party	Second party
Candidate	Rebekha Sharkie	Georgina Downer
Party	Centre Alliance	Liberal
Popular vote	39,369	33,219
Percentage	44.37%	37.44%
Swing	▲9.51	▼0.32
2CP	57.53%	42.47%
2CP swing	▲2.56	▼2.56
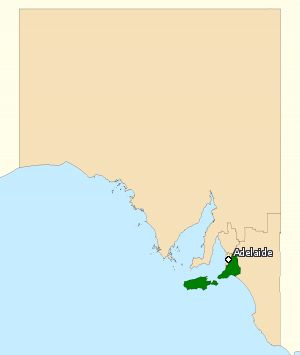
MP before election
Rebekha Sharkie
Centre Alliance
Elected MP
Rebekha Sharkie
Centre Alliance

A by-election for the Australian House of Representatives seat of Mayo took place on Saturday 28 July 2018, following the resignation of incumbent Centre Alliance MP Rebekha Sharkie.

In early counting, within an hour of the close of polls, the Australian Broadcasting Corporation's psephologist Antony Green's electoral computer had predicted Sharkie to retain the electorate with an increased margin.

The by-election occurred on the same day as four other by-elections for the House of Representatives, colloquially known as Super Saturday.

== Background ==
Due to the High Court ruling against Senator Katy Gallagher on 9 May 2018 as part of the ongoing parliamentary eligibility crisis, Sharkie and three other MPs in the same situation announced their parliamentary resignations later that day, while the Perth incumbent resigned for family reasons. The Speaker announced on 24 May 2018 that he had scheduled the by-elections to occur on 28 July 2018. Popularly labelled "Super Saturday", the occurrence of five simultaneous federal by-elections is unprecedented in Australian political history. The others are:

- 2018 Braddon by-election
- 2018 Fremantle by-election
- 2018 Longman by-election
- 2018 Perth by-election

Liberal candidate Georgina Downer deleted her Twitter account on 13 June 2018, claiming that trolls had been attacking her with bad language, with counterclaims from Twitter users that she had deleted legitimate policy questions posted to her Facebook account.

Historically, the rural seat of Mayo has been a comfortably safe Liberal seat in two-party terms, though over the past two decades, the Liberals in Mayo had been repeatedly left vulnerable by several strong election results from minor parties and independents. Mayo was represented by Liberal candidate Georgina Downer's father, Alexander Downer, for the first 24 years of Mayo's 34-year history. Further back, others in the Downer family including a Premier of South Australia represented overlapping geographical areas, in the federal seat of Angas and the state seats of Barossa and Encounter Bay.

== Key dates ==
Key dates in relation to the by-election are:

- Friday, 11 May 2018 – Speaker acceptance of resignation
- Friday, 15 June 2018 – Issue of writ
- Friday, 22 June 2018 – Close of electoral rolls (8pm)
- Thursday, 5 July 2018 – Close of nominations (12 noon)
- Friday, 6 July 2018 – Declaration of nominations (12 noon)
- Tuesday, 10 July 2018 – Start of early voting
- Saturday, 28 July 2018 – Polling day (8am to 6pm)
- Friday, 10 August 2018 – Last day for receipt of postal votes
- Sunday, 23 September 2018 – Last day for return of writs

== Candidates ==
Candidates are listed in the order they appeared on the ballot.

Party	Candidate	Background
Christian Democrats	Tracey-Lee Cane	Pastor
People	Kelsie Harfouche	Beauty therapist and business owner
Greens	Major Sumner	High-profile Ngarrindjeri elder, Order of Australia recipient, community worker and activist
Liberal	Georgina Downer	Lawyer, Institute of Public Affairs research fellow, former diplomat
Centre Alliance	Rebekha Sharkie	Previous MP for Mayo elected at the 2016 federal election
Liberal Democrats	Stephen Humble	Contested the 2012 Port Adelaide state by-election and the upper house at the 2018 state election
Labor	Reg Coutts	Telecommunications consultant and academic professor

The Family First Party (now the Australian Conservatives) contested Mayo at the last election on 4.6% (−2.5%) but declined to contest the by-election.

== Polling ==
Mayo by-election polling
Date	Firm	Commissioned by	Sample	Primary vote						TCP vote
				CA	LIB	ALP	GRN	OTH	UND	CA	LIB
23 July 2018	YouGov−Galaxy	The Advertiser	540	47%	35%	9%	7%	2%	−	59%	41%
21 June 2018	ReachTEL	Australia Institute	736	43.5%	32.7%	8.2%	9.0%	4.1%	2.6%	62%	38%
7 June 2018	YouGov−Galaxy	The Advertiser	515	44%	37%	11%	6%	2%	2%	58%	42%
5 June 2018	ReachTEL	Australia Institute	1031	40.1%	34.4%	7.7%	10.7%	3.5%	3.6%	58%	42%
2016 election				34.9%	37.8%	13.5%	8.1%	5.8%		55.0%	45.0%

== Results ==
2018 Mayo by-election
Party	Candidate	Votes	%	±%
Centre Alliance	Rebekha Sharkie	39,369	44.37	+9.51
Liberal	Georgina Downer	33,219	37.44	−0.32
Greens	Major Sumner	7,898	8.90	+0.85
Labor	Reg Coutts	5,370	6.05	−7.47
Christian Democrats	Tracey-Lee Cane	1,348	1.52	+1.52
Liberal Democrats	Stephen Humble	809	0.91	−0.30
People's Party	Kelsie Harfouche	716	0.81	+0.81
Total formal votes		88,729	96.47	−0.64
Informal votes		3,246	3.53	+0.64
Turnout		91,975	85.52	−8.67
Two-party-preferred result
Liberal	Georgina Downer	49,375	55.65	+0.30
Labor	Reg Coutts	39,354	44.35	−0.30
Two-candidate-preferred result
Centre Alliance	Rebekha Sharkie	51,042	57.53	+2.56
Liberal	Georgina Downer	37,687	42.47	−2.56
Centre Alliance hold		Swing	+2.56	

== See also ==
- July 2018 Australian federal by-elections
- List of Australian federal by-elections
- 2017–18 Australian parliamentary eligibility crisis
