= Wyatt Roy =

Australian politician (born 1990)

The Honourable Wyatt Roy
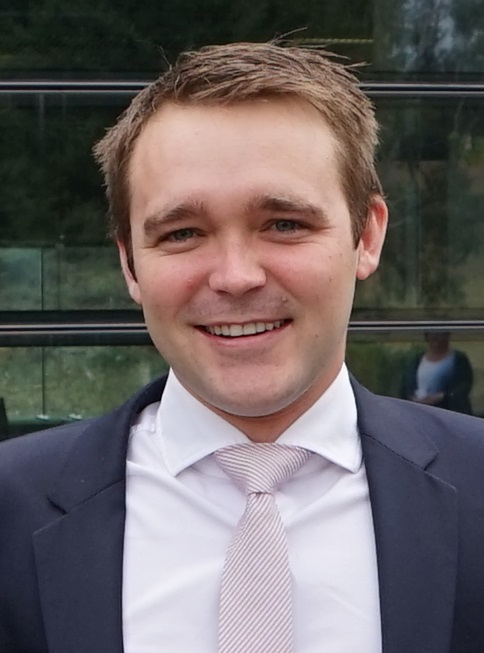
- Wyatt Roy in 2016

Assistant Minister for Innovation
- In office 21 September 2015 – 19 July 2016
- Prime Minister: Malcolm Turnbull
- Preceded by: New portfolio
- Succeeded by: Craig Laundy (as Assistant Minister for Industry, Innovation and Science)

Member of the Australian Parliament for Longman
- In office 21 August 2010 – 2 July 2016
- Preceded by: Jon Sullivan
- Succeeded by: Susan Lamb

Personal details
- Born: Wyatt Beau Roy; 22 May 1990 (age 36) Buderim, Queensland, Australia
- Party: Liberal National
- Education: University of Queensland (studies not completed)

Wyatt Beau Roy (born 22 May 1990) is a former Australian parliamentarian. He served as the Assistant Minister for Innovation from September 2015 to the July 2016 federal election. He was a Liberal National Party of Queensland (LNP) member of the Australian House of Representatives from August 2010 to July 2016, representing the electorate of Longman. At 20 years of age, he was the youngest person ever to be elected to an Australian parliament. The federal record was previously held by Edwin Corboy, who was 22 when elected in 1918. He also became the youngest Minister in the history of the Commonwealth, being appointed to the ministry at the age of 25.

== Personal life ==
Roy was raised on a strawberry farm north of Brisbane. He has two older half-brothers and a younger sister. Roy attended Matthew Flinders Anglican College on the Sunshine Coast, and studied at Melbourne's La Trobe University before returning to his home state to study political science and international relations at the University of Queensland, although he did not graduate.

== Political career ==
Prior to the election, there was speculation that the Liberal National Party did not want Roy endorsed as the candidate for Longman, because of his youth. However, both Liberal leader Tony Abbott and Nationals leader Warren Truss publicly endorsed Roy.

Roy's campaign was not without incident. His electoral success may have been helped by a gaffe made by his Labor opponent and incumbent member, Jon Sullivan. In the closing week of the 2010 federal election campaign, Sullivan gained national media attention when, at a candidates' forum, he criticised the father of a seven-year-old child with a disability for waiting two years on a Queensland Health waiting list. Sullivan apologised to the father at the first available opportunity, and dismissed the significance of the incident in the days following his defeat. A week earlier, one of Roy's campaign volunteers was involved in an incident, captured on video, in which the volunteer hit a Labor supporter in the face while campaigning. The LNP claimed the attack had been provoked by the Labor campaign worker holding a giant L-plate sign next to a poster of Roy.

Roy's election at 20 years of age quickly earned him the award of "Politician of the Year" from GQ magazine. Soon after, he was romantically linked to teenaged sailor Jessica Watson.

In 2012, at 21 years of age, Roy debuted on Cleo magazine's list of most eligible bachelors, alongside triple-code footballing superstar Israel Folau, actor Ryan Corr, and MasterChef contestant Hayden Quinn.

Roy supported same-sex marriage in Australia and a conscience vote on the issue in parliament.

In 2015, Roy was appointed as Assistant Minister for Innovation, an outer ministry position assisting the Minister for Industry, Innovation and Science.

At the federal election in 2016, Roy lost the seat of Longman to Labor candidate Susan Lamb by a margin of 3%, with an 8.45% swing to Labor.

== Post-political career ==
In 2016, he visited a warzone in Iraq where he became caught up in a firefight between Islamic State (IS) and Kurdish Peshmerga forces, earning criticism from among others Prime Minister Malcolm Turnbull, who admonished Roy for his "very stupid" decision to visit.

The Australian reported in 2019 that Roy had formed a relationship with Josie Ashby, a former adviser to Foreign Minister Julie Bishop, who was credited as a 'wingwoman' who helped pair up the Liberal power couple after a long courtship that started when Roy would deluge Bishop's ministerial office with gifts of fresh strawberries from his family farm in Queensland.

Roy later joined Afiniti, a global artificial intelligence company, as its Australian general manager. He was based in Sydney until 2024 when he relocated to Saudi Arabia to accept appointment as Head of Innovation at NEOM, the entity wholly owned by the Saudi sovereign wealth fund and which was described as an ambitious and controversial project to build a futuristic city in Saudi Arabia powered by renewable energy. He has also held roles at McKinsey & Company and solar energy company SunDrive Solar.

== See also ==
- Baby of the House, an unofficial title given to the youngest member of a parliamentary house

Parliament of Australia
| Preceded by Jon Sullivan | Member for Longman; 2010–2016 | Succeeded by Susan Lamb |
Political offices
| New ministerial post | Assistant Minister for Innovation; 2015–2016 | Succeeded by Craig Laundy as Assistant Minister for Industry, Innovation and Science |
