= Patrick Gorman (politician) =

Australian politician

The Honourable Patrick Gorman MP
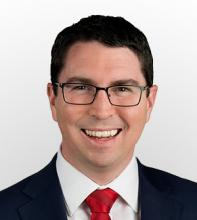

Assistant Minister to the Prime Minister
- Incumbent
- Assumed office 21 May 2022
- Prime Minister: Anthony Albanese
- Preceded by: Ben Morton

Assistant Minister for the Public Service
- Incumbent
- Assumed office 31 May 2023
- Prime Minister: Anthony Albanese
- Minister: Katy Gallagher
- Preceded by: Ben Morton

Assistant Minister for Employment and Workplace Relations
- Incumbent
- Assumed office 13 May 2025
- Prime Minister: Anthony Albanese
- Minister: Amanda Rishworth
- Preceded by: Andrew Leigh (as Assistant Minister for Employment)

Assistant Minister to the Attorney-General
- In office 29 July 2024 – 13 May 2025
- Prime Minister: Anthony Albanese
- Minister: Mark Dreyfus
- Preceded by: Matt Thistlethwaite (as Assistant Minister for the Republic)

Member of the Australian Parliament for Perth
- Incumbent
- Assumed office 28 July 2018
- Preceded by: Tim Hammond

Personal details
- Born: 12 December 1984 (age 41) East Fremantle, Western Australia, Australia
- Party: Australian Labor Party
- Spouse: Jess Bukowski
- Children: 2
- Occupation: Political advisor
- Website: www.patrickgormanmp.com

Patrick Possum Gorman (born 12 December 1984) is an Australian politician, elected as an Australian Labor Party representative for the Division of Perth at the 2018 Perth by-election.

== Early life ==
Gorman was born on 12 December 1984 in East Fremantle, Western Australia. His parents are Wendy and Ron Gorman, who were both teachers. Gorman has a younger brother. He attended Lance Holt School, a small independent primary school run by his parents in Fremantle, and Melville Senior High School. He then completed a Bachelor of Social Science at Curtin University, and a Graduate Diploma of Business and a Master of Business Administration at the University of Western Australia.

== Early career ==
From 2006 to 2007, Gorman worked as a research officer for Ken Travers, a member of the Western Australian Legislative Council, and from 2008 to 2009, Gorman worked as an electorate officer for Melissa Parke, a member of the Australian House of Representatives. During this time, he held several voluntary positions in the Labor Party: from 2006 to 2008, he was secretary of the Australian Labor Party Curtin University sub-branch; from 2007 to 2008, he was Secretary of Young Labor (WA); and in 2009, he was convenor of the Australian Labor Party Conservation, Environment and Climate Change Policy Committee (WA).

From 2010 to 2013, Gorman worked in various advisor positions for Kevin Rudd, including as principal advisor during Rudd's second term as prime minister. In 2014 and 2015, Gorman worked as Director of Public Affairs for the United Voice union, which is part of the Labor Left faction.

In 2015, Gorman replaced Simon Mead as the State Secretary of WA Labor, with the backing of United Voice. Mead had resigned after losing support from WA Labor leader Mark McGowan, and United Voice. As secretary, Gorman led the 2017 Western Australian state election campaign for Labor, where McGowan became Premier of Western Australia.

== In parliament ==
In May 2018, Gorman was selected as the Labor Party's candidate for the division of Perth at the 2018 Perth by-election. This came after first-term MP Tim Hammond resigned from parliament, citing that he wanted to spend more time with his family. The Liberal Party declined to contest the election. The by-election was held on 28 July, the same day as 4 other by-elections. Gorman won with a primary vote of 38.5%, and a two-party-preferred vote of 63.1% against the Greens.

Gorman retained his seat at the 2019 Australian federal election.

In a January 2021 shadow cabinet reshuffle, Gorman became Shadow Assistant Minister for Western Australia.

In October 2021, Gorman announced his support for changing the date of Australia Day, having previously been against the idea. In addition to the day's negative impact on Indigenous people, he said that Australia Day is "not a date that means much to what became Western Australia". He also said he was wrong not to previously support changing the date.

=== Albanese government ===
Following the election of the Albanese government in May 2022, Gorman became the Assistant Minister to the Prime Minister. In May 2023, Gorman became the Assistant Minister to the Public Service as well. In July 2024, he was appointed Assistant Minister to the Attorney-General.

After the re-election of the Labor government in the 2025 Australian federal election, Gorman retained the posts of Assistant Minister to the Prime Minister and Assistant Minister to the Public Service, was additionally appointed Assistant Minister for Employment and Workplace Relations, while the post of Assistant Minister to the Attorney-General lapsed.

== Personal life ==
Gorman is married to Jess Bukowski. They have two children.

Parliament of Australia
Preceded by Tim Hammond	Member for Perth; 2018–present	Incumbent
