= Josh Wilson (politician) =

Australian politician (born 1972)

Josh Wilson MP
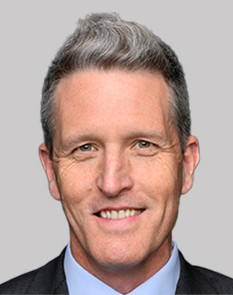
- Wilson c. 2024

Member of the Australian Parliament for Fremantle
- Incumbent
- Assumed office 28 July 2018
- In office 2 July 2016 – 10 May 2018
- Preceded by: Melissa Parke

Personal details
- Born: Joshua Hamilton Wilson; 5 June 1972 (age 54) Westminster, London, England
- Citizenship: Australian; British (1972–2016)
- Party: Labor
- Spouse: Georgia
- Children: 3
- Website: www.joshwilson.org.au

Joshua Hamilton Wilson (born 5 June 1972) is a British-born Australian politician. He is the Labor member for Fremantle in the House of Representatives, serving from 2 July 2016 until his resignation on 10 May 2018 as a part of the 2017–18 Australian parliamentary eligibility crisis and then since the 2018 Fremantle by-election.

== Early life ==
Wilson was born on 5 June 1972 in Westminster, London. As a child he lived in India and Long Island, New York before moving to Fremantle.

=== Education ===
Wilson has a Bachelor of Arts (Honours) from the University of Western Australia, and a Master of Arts (Honours) from the University of Melbourne.

== Career ==
Before going into politics, Wilson served as an associate lecturer at Curtin University, a paralegal and litigation project manager, a freelance journalist and as a travel writer.

Wilson was a councillor of the City of Fremantle from 2009 to 2016, was Deputy Mayor of Fremantle from 2011 and also worked as a staffer to his predecessor as the member for Fremantle, Melissa Parke. During his time as Deputy Mayor, Wilson initiated the "Fremantle Forever" campaign which opposed local government amalgamations, worked on economic development and revitalisation, and introduced an Indigenous employment target. He initially lost preselection to contest the seat in 2016 to Chris Brown, but he became the candidate when Brown was forced to stand aside after failing to declare spent convictions.

Wilson was elected to the Australian House of Representatives for the seat of Fremantle in the 2016 federal election with 40.99% of the primary vote, and 57.52% of the two-party-preferred vote. On 9 May 2018, Wilson announced his resignation from the House of Representatives following the High Court of Australia ruling that Senator Katy Gallagher was ineligible to contest the 2016 election. Like Gallagher, Wilson had failed to renounce his British citizenship before nomination in the 2016 federal election. Wilson was re-elected in the subsequent 2018 Fremantle by-election.

On 29 July 2024, Wilson was sworn in as Assistant Minister for Climate Change and Energy.

In the 2025 Australian federal election Wilson was re-elected against a challenge from teal independent candidate Kate Hulett. He continued as Assistant Minister for Climate Change and Energy, while also appointed as Assistant Minister for Emergency Management in the second Albanese ministry.

== Personal life ==
Wilson lives with his wife and three children in Fremantle.

Wilson also plays for Fremantle City FC's under-45 side. On 24 June 2026, he was suspended for 5 games for striking an opposing player in the face during a match against UWA Nedlands FC.

Parliament of Australia
Preceded by Melissa Parke	Member for Fremantle; 2016–2018, 2018–present	Incumbent
