= Susan Lamb =

Australian politician

Member of the Australian Parliament for Longman
- In office 2 July 2016 – 10 May 2018; 28 July 2018 – 18 May 2019
- Preceded by: Wyatt Roy
- Succeeded by: Terry Young

Personal details
- Born: 23 March 1972 (age 54) Mackay, Queensland, Australia
- Citizenship: Australian; British (to 14 May 2018)
- Party: Labor
- Children: Four
- Occupation: Politician teacher aide (former) union official (former)

Susan Lamb (born 23 March 1972) is an Australian politician. She was the member for the Division of Longman originally elected at the 2016 election on 2 July 2016 until her resignation on 10 May 2018 as a part of the 2017–18 Australian parliamentary eligibility crisis. She regained the seat on 28 July as one of five candidates to contest seats in the Super Saturday by-elections. She went on to lose her seat at the 2019 election, due to the swing against Labor in Queensland.

== Life ==
Born in Mackay, Queensland, Lamb was a teacher aide, then a lead organiser with United Voice from 2012. Lamb defeated the Liberal National Party of Queensland's Assistant Minister for Innovation Wyatt Roy in the 2016 Australian federal election. The LNP had expected to retain the seat located in Brisbane's northern suburbs only to lose by a small margin of 0.79 points.

Lamb was implicated in the 2017–18 Australian parliamentary eligibility crisis as she was alleged to be a British citizen by descent through her deceased father, who was born in Scotland. She had attempted to renounce her British citizenship before nominating for election in 2016. However, her renunciation form was refused by UK authorities because they were not satisfied that she was, in fact, a British citizen and requested additional documents as evidence. Lamb claimed to have fulfilled all the requirements of section 44(i) as she believed she had taken all reasonable steps to renounce her citizenship – if it were the case that she was a British citizen – as she was unable to provide any further documents; she said she was "estranged" from her mother and that her father had died. On 7 February 2018, she gave a longer description of her life story in a speech to the House of Representatives. The British government asked for her British passport (she had never held one) and her parents' marriage certificate. She claimed her mother left the family when she was six years old and she had had no relationship with her mother because her father had died. However, Lamb's mother and stepmother later contradicted her version of the story. It was revealed that Lamb and her mother had maintained contact at least until 2014 and that her mother had helped organise her wedding. The government stated that it believed that her situation should be referred to the High Court for a decision on her eligibility.

On 9 May 2018, Lamb announced her resignation from the House of Representatives following the High Court of Australia ruling that Senator Katy Gallagher was ineligible to contest the 2016 election. On 15 May, the Labor Party released documentation from the UK Home Office confirming that Lamb's citizenship had been renounced the previous day, clearing her to nominate as a candidate for the Longman by-election. She was re-elected at the by-election held on 28 July.

Her victory in the by-election has been cited for the downfall almost a month later of Liberal Prime Minister Malcolm Turnbull.

Parliament of Australia
Preceded by Wyatt Roy	Member for Longman; 2016–2018, 2018–2019	Succeeded by Terry Young
