= Justine Keay =

Australian politician (born 1975)

Member of the Australian Parliament for Braddon
- In office 28 July 2018 – 18 May 2019
- Succeeded by: Gavin Pearce
- In office 2 July 2016 – 10 May 2018
- Preceded by: Brett Whiteley

Personal details
- Born: Justine Terri Keay; 18 March 1975 (age 51) Devonport, Tasmania, Australia
- Party: Labor
- Children: 3
- Education: University of Tasmania

Justine Terri Keay (born 18 March 1975) is an Australian former politician. She was the Labor member for Braddon in the House of Representatives, serving from the 2016 federal election held on 2 July 2016 until her resignation on 10 May 2018 as a part of the 2017–18 Australian parliamentary eligibility crisis and then since the 2018 Braddon by-election until 2019. She replaced the Liberal Party's Brett Whiteley.

Keay was an alderman for Devonport City Council for seven years, resigning on 26 May 2016. She has a Bachelor of Arts in History and Geography from the University of Tasmania. She worked in the television industry with Southern Cross Television and WIN Television in Western Australia before gaining further qualifications from Murdoch University in Environmental Impact Assessment and Environmental Management and has received a Graduate Diploma in Psychology from Monash University. She returned to Tasmania and entered politics as an assistant to then Minister for Environment the Hon Bryan Green MP.

On 9 May 2018, Keay announced her resignation from the House of Representatives following the High Court of Australia ruling that Senator Katy Gallagher was ineligible to contest the 2016 election. Like Gallagher, Keay had failed to renounce her British citizenship before nomination in the 2016 federal election. She contested and won the 2018 Braddon by-election on 28 July. She lost her seat at the 2019 Australian federal election.

Parliament of Australia
Preceded by Brett Whiteley	Member for Braddon; 2016–2018, 2018–2019	Succeeded by Gavin Pearce
