= Tim Hammond =

Australian politician (born 1975)

Member of the Australian Parliament for Perth
- In office 2 July 2016 – 10 May 2018
- Preceded by: Alannah MacTiernan
- Succeeded by: Patrick Gorman

Personal details
- Born: Timothy Jerome Hammond; 25 March 1975 (age 51) Mount Lawley, Western Australia
- Party: Australian Labor Party
- Education: Murdoch University
- Profession: Barrister, solicitor

Timothy Jerome Hammond (born 25 March 1975) is a former Australian politician. He was the member for Perth in the Australian House of Representatives. He is a member of the Australian Labor Party and succeeded the previous member, Alannah MacTiernan, at the 2016 federal election.

He was initially awarded the portfolios of Shadow Assistant Minister for Resources, Innovation, Western Australia, The Digital Economy and Start Ups in the Labor Shadow Ministry. In September 2016 he was promoted to the full ministry as Shadow Minister for Consumer Affairs and Shadow Minister Assisting for Resources.

Hammond was a barrister before entering politics. He previously ran unsuccessfully for parliament as the Labor candidate for Swan in 2010.

Upon election at the 2016 election, Hammond was appointed on 23 July 2016 to the positions of Shadow Assistant Minister for Digital Economy and Startups; Innovation; and Resources and Western Australia. He surrendered these three posts two months later on 14 September 2016 to take up roles as Shadow Minister for Consumer Affairs and Assisting for Resources.

In 2017 bookmakers installed Hammond as a $4.50 chance to become the next prime minister from Western Australia (second-favourite behind Julie Bishop).

On 2 May 2018 Hammond announced he would be resigning from Parliament in the near future, citing family reasons. He submitted his resignation to the Speaker on 10 May.

Parliament of Australia
Preceded by Alannah MacTiernan	Member for Perth; 2016–2018	Succeeded by Patrick Gorman
