= Rebekha Sharkie =

Australian politician (born 1972)

Rebekha Sharkie MP
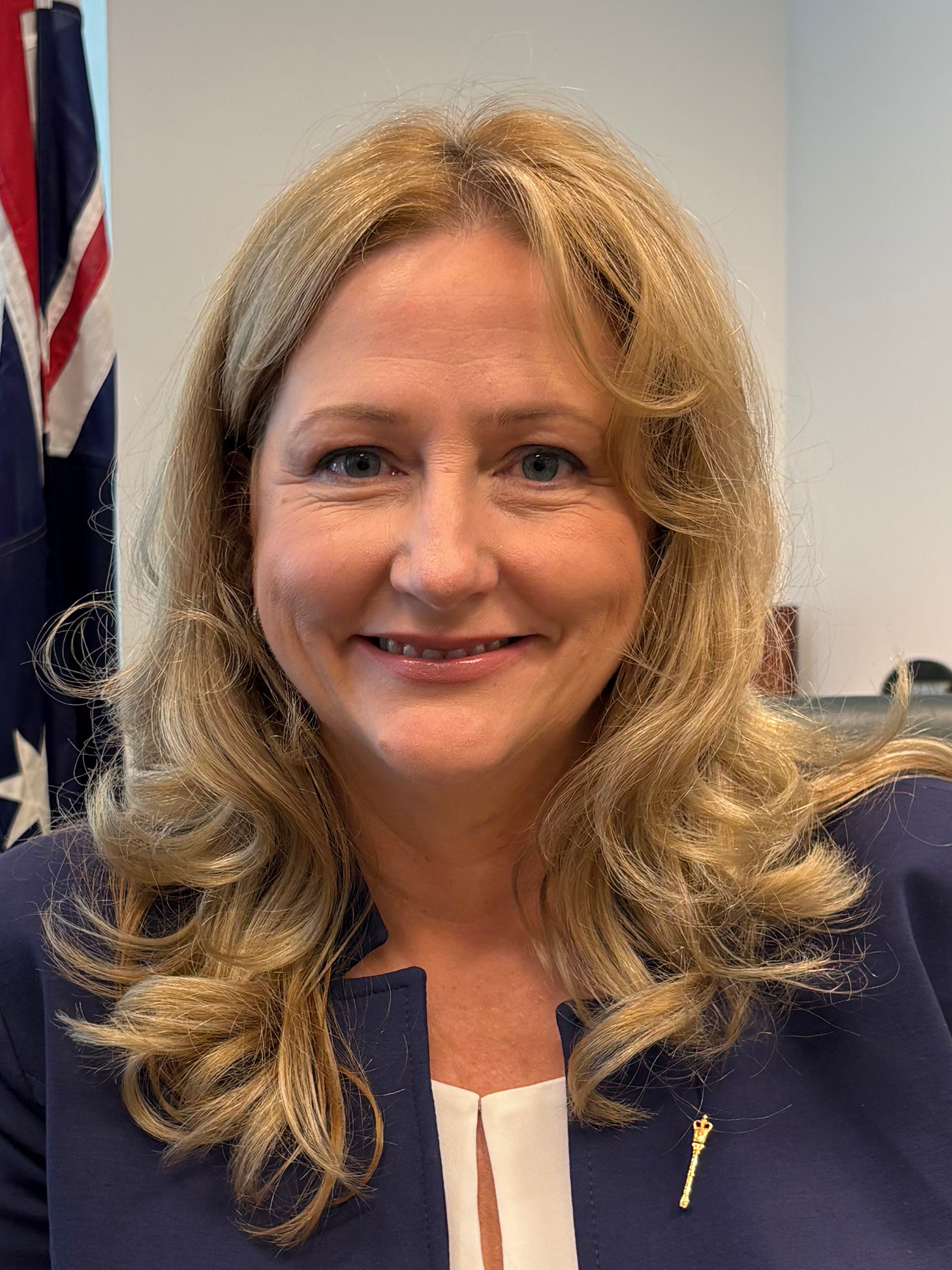
- Sharkie in 2025

Member of the Australian Parliament for Mayo
- Incumbent
- Assumed office 28 July 2018
- Preceded by: Herself
- In office 2 July 2016 – 11 May 2018
- Preceded by: Jamie Briggs
- Succeeded by: Herself

Second Deputy Speaker of the Australian House of Representatives
- In office 26 July 2022 – 31 March 2025 Serving with Ian Goodenough
- Speaker: Milton Dick
- Preceded by: Sharon Claydon
- Succeeded by: Terry Young

Personal details
- Born: Rebekha Carina Che; 24 August 1972 (age 54) Torbay, England
- Party: Centre Alliance (2013–present)
- Other political affiliations: Liberal (2010–2012)
- Children: 3
- Education: Flinders University
- Website: www.rebekhasharkie.com.au

Rebekha Carina Sharkie (née Che; born 24 August 1972) is an Australian politician who has been the member of parliament (MP) for the South Australian division of Mayo since 2016.

Prior to entering parliament Sharkie worked in the non-profit sector and as a political advisor to Liberal MP Jamie Briggs. After resigning from the Liberal Party she defeated Briggs at the 2016 federal election standing for the Nick Xenophon Team (NXT), the party's only successful candidate in the House of Representatives. She resigned from parliament in 2018 during the parliamentary eligibility crisis, due to her British citizenship, but was re-elected at the 2018 Mayo by-election and subsequently at the 2019, 2022 and 2025 elections. Sharkie is typically regarded as an independent; her party was renamed the Centre Alliance in 2018 but ceased fielding other candidates after the 2019 election.

== Early life and education ==
Sharkie was born on 24 August 1972 in Torbay, England in 1972 to British and American parents. The family moved to Australia when Sharkie was two years old. She attended Cardijn College and Eyensbury Senior College for her high school education and went on to study international relations and public policy at Flinders University. Sharkie became a naturalised Australian on 19 March 2007, and formally renounced her British citizenship in 2016.

Prior to working as a political advisor, Sharkie worked as a paralegal in Darwin and South Australia. In 2012 she was appointed as national executive officer of Youth Connections, a service targeting youth employment. When that program was defunded by the Liberal government at the end of 2014, she became senior manager and head of donor relations at Helping Young People Achieve (HYPA), a charity assisting young disadvantaged people in South Australia.

== Early political involvement ==
As a high school student, Sharkie handed out how-to-vote cards for Australian Democrats candidate Janine Haines. In 2006, she worked as a researcher for state Liberal leader Isobel Redmond. In 2008, she worked as an electorate officer for federal Liberal MP Jamie Briggs for six months. Sharkie also worked for South Australian state Liberal MP Rachel Sanderson. Although she had worked for the Liberals for some time, she was only a formal member of the party from 2010 to 2012.

Sharkie considered running for the Liberals in the 2014 state election in the safe seat of Schubert, only to be told that she needed the blessing of federal minister Christopher Pyne and federal senator Cory Bernardi, the highest-ranking federal MPs from the moderate and conservative factions of the SA Liberals, before seeking preselection. Sharkie told The Australian that when she learned she couldn't stand without the "anointing" of Pyne and Bernardi, she was appalled. She asked, "Are you serious? A branch doesn't choose?" Combined with her anger at the "ditch the witch" campaign against Julia Gillard, she was thus very receptive when then-independent Senator Nick Xenophon announced he was forming his own party to stand candidates in the upcoming federal election. Initially serving as a volunteer for the newly-formed Nick Xenophon Team, she ultimately agreed to stand in Mayo. Although Mayo had been a very safe Liberal seat for most of its existence, polling suggested that if Labor directed its preferences to Sharkie, she could take the seat off the Liberals.

== House of Representatives ==
=== Electoral record ===
At the 2016 federal election, Sharkie defeated Briggs with 55 percent of the two-candidate preferred vote. On the first count, she finished only three points behind Briggs, who lost over 16 percent of his primary vote from 2013. This allowed her to ultimately defeat Briggs on Labor preferences. She is the first woman and the first non-Liberal member to represent Mayo.

On 9 May 2018, Sharkie announced her resignation from the House of Representatives following the High Court of Australia ruling that Senator Katy Gallagher was ineligible to contest the 2016 election as a consequence of the 2017–18 Australian parliamentary eligibility crisis. Like Gallagher, Sharkie had failed to complete renunciation of her British citizenship before nomination in the 2016 federal election. She contested the 2018 Mayo by-election on 28 July, and was returned to parliament with a swing in her favour.

Sharkie successfully defended her Mayo seat in the May 2019 federal election winning her seat with a two candidate preferred vote of 55.14%, up 2.22% on the previous election. She was re-elected in the 2022 Australian federal election with the support of the Teal independents, and re-elected to serve a fourth term in the 2025 Australian federal election. Prior to the election she hinted at her support for a Liberal–National Coalition in a hung parliament.

=== Party affiliation ===
Sharkie was the only Nick Xenophon Team (NXT) candidate elected to the House of Representatives at the 2016 election, joining Xenophon and Skye Kakoschke-Moore who were elected to the Senate. In the House she joined the crossbench, consisting of five members not aligned to either major party.

NXT changed its name to the Centre Alliance in April 2018, after Xenophon ceased his active involvement with the party. Sharkie was the only candidate for Centre Alliance at the 2022 and 2025 elections. In a 2025 interview, she described it as a "party of one" and stated its continued existence was due to difficulties with electoral laws allowing the transfer of funds from a registered party to an independent.

=== Political views and advocacy ===
Sharkie approached finance minister Mathias Cormann in 2019 about funding a research centre in the region that includes the complex ecosystems of the Coorong, Lower Lakes, and Murray Mouth. The Coorong, Lower Lakes and Murray Mouth (CLLMM) Research Centre in Goolwa, run by the Goyder Institute for Water Research, was officially opened by Sharkie in early February 2024.

In 2026, Sharkie announced that she would introduce a private member's bill to outlaw burning of the national flag, as well as the Aboriginal flag and the Torres Strait Islander flag. Her bill would have provided for offenders to be jailed for up to two years.

== Personal life ==
As of 2016, Rebekha is married to Nathan Sharkie. They live in Birdwood, South Australia. She has three children from a previous marriage, which ended around 2008.

Parliament of Australia
Preceded by Jamie Briggs	Member for Mayo; 2016–2018, 2018–present	Incumbent
