= Australian People's Party (2014) =

- Leader: Bruno Strangio
- Founded: 2014
- Dissolved: November 2021
- Headquarters: Victoria
- Colours: Burgundy

The Australian People's Party was a registered political party in Australia. It was registered by the Australian Electoral Commission in March 2017. It was formed in 2014. The party recruited enough members to gain registration in March 2017. The party said its aim was to improve standards of living and rights for all Australians through commonsense policies. The party described itself as a centrist party. The party was de-registered in November 2021 by the Australian Electoral Commission for not having 500 members.

In 2019 the Australian People's Party fielded 2 senate candidates for New South Wales. In 2017 the Australian People's Party stood a candidate for the by-election of the Division of New England, and again in the 2018 Batman by-election.

The party ran candidates in all five of the federal by-elections occurring on 28 July 2018, putting the Australian Labor Party last on their how-to-vote cards in each seat except for Mayo where previous incumbent Centre Alliance's Rebekha Sharkie was placed last. The party ran a candidate in the 16-candidate 2018 Wentworth by-election. All six candidates received the lowest number of first preference votes in their respective by-elections.

There have been several previous entities with the same name, including a party from Condobolin, New South Wales in 1917, a party contesting the Division of Martin in 1929, and a party contesting the Western Australian state seat of Joondalup in 1996.

In 2026, it was revealed that Gerard Rennick People First and the Australian Citizens Party would be merging to form the Australian Peoples Party.
