= ReachTEL =

Market research company based in Australia

- Company type: Market research
- Founded: 2008
- Founder: James Stewart and Nick Adams
- Owner: Equifax
- Website: www.equifax.com.au/reachtel/

ReachTEL is a market research company founded and based in Australia, now owned by the American multinational company Equifax. It conducts regular opinion polling for Australian politics.

== History ==
ReachTEL was founded by James Stewart and Nick Adams in 2008. In September 2015 the company was acquired by the data analytics company Veda, which was also the largest credit reference agency in Australia at the time. Veda was subsequently sold to the American multinational consumer credit reporting agency Equifax in February 2016.

James Stewart resigned from ReachTEL in 2018, and subsequently acquired a third share in the market research company UComms, co-owned by union bosses Sally McManus, secretary of the ACTU, and Michael O'Connor, national secretary of the CFMMEU, both non-beneficiary shareholders of the company on behalf of their unions. Although opinion polls were often recorded as "uComms/ReachTEL" opinion polls, and UComms' logo formerly included the phrase "Powered by ReachTEL", the only relationship is the use of ReachTEL's data and the use of its original robo-polling and SMS technology.

== Description ==
ReachTEL is wholly owned by Equifax and is not affiliated to any other group or interests. Along with Newspoll, Roy Morgan, Essential, YouGov and Ipsos Australia, it conducts regular opinion polling for Australian politics.
