= Division of Perth =

Australian federal electoral division

Coordinates: 31.910°S 115.905°E

Perth Australian House of Representatives Division
- Interactive map of electorate boundaries from the 2025 federal election
- Created: 1901
- MP: Patrick Gorman
- Party: Labor
- Namesake: Perth
- Electors: 122,719 (2022)
- Area: 80 km^{2} (30.9 sq mi)
- Demographic: Inner metropolitan
Electorates around Perth:
| Cowan | Cowan | Hasluck |
| Curtin | Perth | Hasluck |
| Curtin | Swan | Swan |

The Division of Perth is an Australian electoral division in the state of Western Australia. It is centred on and named after the city of Perth, the state capital. Since 2018 its MP has been Patrick Gorman of the Labor Party.

== History ==
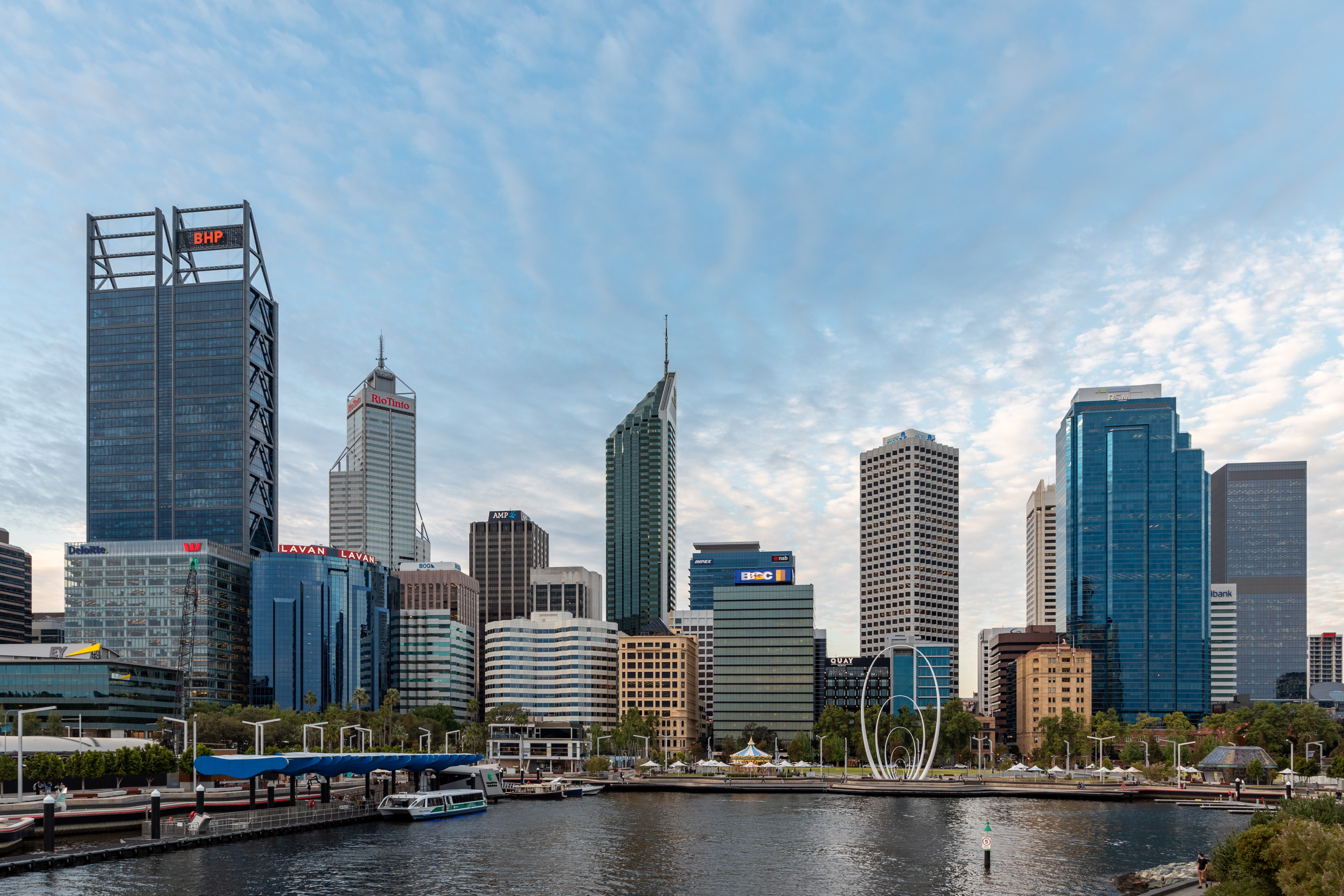
The city of Perth, the division's namesake

The division was one of the original 65 divisions to be contested at the first federal election in 1901. It was one of five electorates created by the Federal House of Representatives Western Australian Electorates Act 1900, an act of the parliament of Western Australia.

It extends northeast along the north bank of the Swan River from Perth, including suburbs such as Maylands, Mount Lawley, Bayswater, Ashfield, Bedford, Morley, Beechboro and the Perth city centre. It is a primarily residential area, although contains an industrial area at Bayswater and major commercial centres in Perth and Morley.

For the first half-century after Federation, Perth and Fremantle were the only seats based on the capital.

Between the 1940s and 1980s, it was a marginal seat that frequently changed hands between the Liberals (and their predecessors) and Labor. During this time, it was normally held by the party of government, electing only two opposition MPs. Since the 1980s, demographic changes have made it a fairly safe Labor seat.

As of the last federal election, Perth has held the strongest Greens vote of all seats in Western Australia, at 18.87%. The growing Greens vote in the seat has come largely at the expense of the Labor Party, whose primary vote has dropped by 11.93% since 1993, when the Greens first contested the division of Perth. The Greens won their first ever booth in the seat in 2019 when the party came first on primary vote in Northbridge. Additionally, the party came a close second in the Highgate booth based on primary vote and also achieved over 20% in 20 of the booths for the first time. In 2022, the Greens polled 22.1% and came a clear second in 18 booths and topped the primary vote in Northbridge, Highgate North and Mount Lawley East.

== Geography ==
Since 1984, federal electoral division boundaries in Australia have been determined at redistributions by a redistribution committee appointed by the Australian Electoral Commission. Redistributions occur for the boundaries of divisions in a particular state, and they occur every seven years, or sooner if a state's representation entitlement changes or when divisions of a state are malapportioned.

In August 2021, the Australian Electoral Commission (AEC) announced that Perth's northern boundary would be altered to run almost entirely along Morley Drive. As a result, Perth's portion of the suburb of Noranda would be transferred to the seat of Cowan, while Perth would gain the suburbs of Joondanna, Tuart Hill, Yokine, the south-east of Osborne Park and the remainder of Coolbinia and Inglewood from the abolished seat of Stirling. In addition, minor changes would occur to Perth's portions of Dianella and Morley. These boundary changes came into effect for the 2022 Australian federal election.

Perth is bordered by the Swan River to the south and east, the Mitchell Freeway and Kings Park to the west, and Morley Drive to the north. It includes the local government areas of the City of Perth, the City of Vincent, the Town of Bassendean, most of the City of Bayswater, and a portion of the City of Stirling. Suburbs presently included are:

- Ashfield
- Bassendean
- Bayswater
- Bedford
- Coolbinia
- Dianella (part)
- East Perth
- Eden Hill
- Embleton
- Highgate
- Inglewood
- Joondanna
- Kings Park
- Leederville
- Maylands
- Menora
- Morley (part)
- Mount Hawthorn
- Mount Lawley
- Northbridge
- North Perth
- Osborne Park (part)
- Perth
- Tuart Hill
- West Perth
- Yokine

== Members ==
| Image | Member | Party | Term | Notes |
|---|---|---|---|---|
| | James Fowler (1863–1940) | Labor | 29 March 1901 – June 1909 | Lost preselection and then lost seat |
| | James Fowler (1863–1940) | Liberal | June 1909 – 17 February 1917 | Lost preselection and then lost seat |
| | James Fowler (1863–1940) | Nationalist | 17 February 1917 – 16 December 1922 | Lost preselection and then lost seat |
| | Edward Mann (1874–1951) | Nationalist | 16 December 1922 – September 1929 | Lost seat |
| | Edward Mann (1874–1951) | Independent Nationalist | September 1929 – 12 October 1929 | Lost seat |
| | Walter Nairn (1879–1958) | Nationalist | 12 October 1929 – 7 May 1931 | Served as Speaker during the Menzies, Fadden and Curtin Governments. Lost seat |
| | Walter Nairn (1879–1958) | United Australia | 7 May 1931 – 21 August 1943 | Served as Speaker during the Menzies, Fadden and Curtin Governments. Lost seat |
| | Tom Burke (1910–1973) | Labor | 21 August 1943 – 10 December 1955 | Lost seat |
| | Fred Chaney (1914–2001) | Liberal | 10 December 1955 – 25 October 1969 | Served as Chief Government Whip in the House under Menzies. Served as minister under Menzies and Holt. Lost seat |
| | Joe Berinson (1932–2018) | Labor | 25 October 1969 – 13 December 1975 | Served as minister under Whitlam. Lost seat. Later elected to the Western Australian Legislative Council in 1980 |
| | Ross McLean (1944–) | Liberal | 13 December 1975 – 5 March 1983 | Lost seat |
| | Ric Charlesworth (1952–) | Labor | 5 March 1983 – 8 February 1993 | Retired |
| | Stephen Smith (1955–) | Labor | 13 March 1993 – 5 August 2013 | Served as minister under Rudd and Gillard. Retired |
| | Alannah MacTiernan (1953–) | Labor | 7 September 2013 – 9 May 2016 | Previously held the Western Australian Legislative Assembly seat of Armadale. Retired. Later elected to the Western Australian Legislative Council in 2017 |
| | Tim Hammond (1975–) | Labor | 2 July 2016 – 10 May 2018 | Resigned to retire from politics |
| | Patrick Gorman (1984–) | Labor | 28 July 2018 – present | Incumbent |

== Election results ==
2025 Australian federal election: Perth
| Party | Candidate | Votes | % | ±% |
|---|---|---|---|---|
| Labor | Patrick Gorman | 42,947 | 43.05 | +3.91 |
| Liberal | Susanna Panaia | 26,026 | 26.09 | −1.12 |
| Greens | Sophie Greer | 24,467 | 24.53 | +2.52 |
| One Nation | Peter Hallifax | 6,316 | 6.33 | +3.71 |
| Total formal votes | | 99,756 | 97.56 | +3.07 |
| Informal votes | | 2,491 | 2.44 | −3.07 |
| Turnout | | 102,247 | 89.33 | +0.44 |
Two-party-preferred result
| Labor | Patrick Gorman | 66,350 | 66.51 | +2.09 |
| Liberal | Susanna Panaia | 33,406 | 33.49 | −2.09 |
| Labor hold | | Swing | +2.09 | |
