= Turnbull government =

Australian government (2015–2018)

Turnbull government

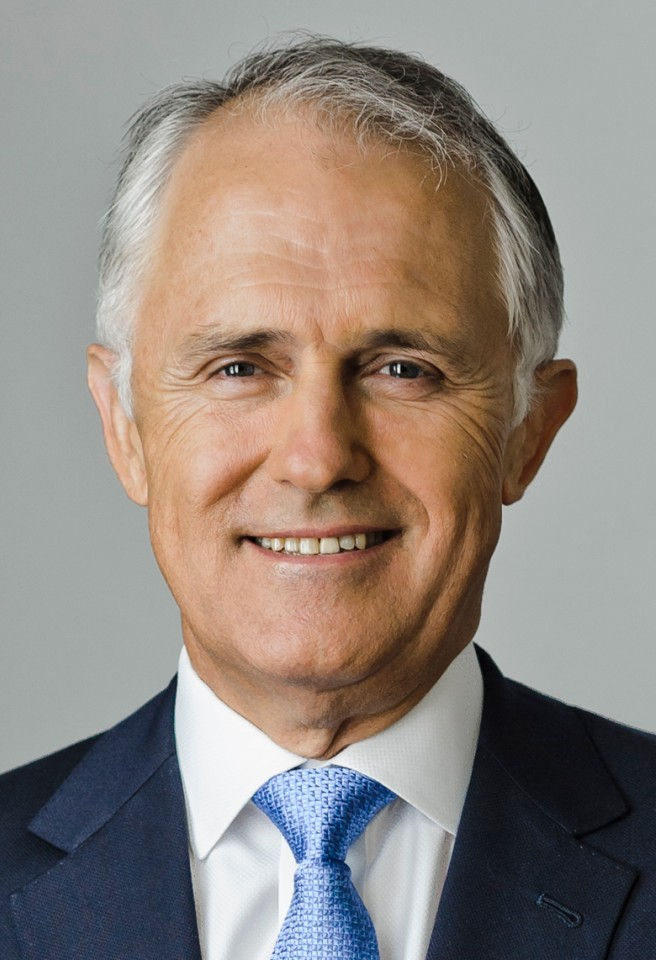

In office
- 15 September 2015 – 24 August 2018
- Monarch: Elizabeth II
- Governor-General: Sir Peter Cosgrove
- Prime Minister: Malcolm Turnbull
- Deputy: Michael McCormack (Feb. 2018 – Aug. 2018); Barnaby Joyce (Feb. 2016 – Oct. 2017; Dec. 2017 – Feb. 2018) Warren Truss (Sept. 2015 – Feb. 2016)
- Party: Liberal and National (Coalition)
- Status: Majority (Sep. 2015 – Nov. 2017; Dec. 2017 – Aug. 2018); Minority (Nov. 2017 – Dec. 2017) (Note: Two government MPs were forced to step down due to the dual citizenship crisis. National MP Barnaby Joyce was ruled invalidly elected on 27 October, and Liberal MP John Alexander resigned on 13 November. Therefore, until Joyce was returned to his seat in a by-election on 2 December, the government held 74 out of 148 seats in the House of Representatives.)
- Origin: Turnbull wins 2015 Liberal leadership spill
- Demise: Turnbull loses 2018 Liberal leadership spill
- Predecessor: Abbott government
- Successor: Morrison government

The Turnbull government was the federal executive government of Australia led by the 29th prime minister of Australia, Malcolm Turnbull, from 2015 to 2018. It succeeded the Abbott government, which brought the Coalition to power at the 2013 Australian federal election. The government consisted of members of Australia's Liberal-Nationals Coalition. Turnbull took office by challenging his leader, Tony Abbott, in an internal leadership ballot. Warren Truss, the leader of the Nationals, served as deputy prime minister until he retired in 2016 and was replaced by Barnaby Joyce. Joyce resigned in February 2018 and the Nationals' new leader Michael McCormack became deputy prime minister. The Turnbull government concluded with Turnbull's resignation ahead of internal leadership ballot which saw him succeeded as prime minister by Scott Morrison and the Morrison government.

In mounting his 2015 public challenge for the leadership, Turnbull cited extended poor polling in Newspoll by the Abbott government and said Australia needed a new style of "economic leadership". Turnbull appointed Morrison as Treasurer in an expanded ministry, promoting several key supporters. Julie Bishop remained as Minister for Foreign Affairs. Conservatives Tony Abbott, Eric Abetz and Kevin Andrews were sent to the backbench. Joe Hockey left Parliament. The Turnbull government continued a number of Abbott government initiatives, promising a plebiscite legalising same-sex marriage, concluding Abbott era initiatives on an anti-domestic violence campaign, funding the National Disability Insurance Scheme, signing a China free trade deal, and reforming Senate voting.

The April 2016 refusal of the Senate to pass the government's bill to re-establish a watchdog for the construction industry provided Turnbull with a double dissolution trigger. An election was held on 2 July, and the government was returned with its majority in the House of Representatives reduced to one seat. The 2016 election saw a resurgence of the right wing Pauline Hanson's One Nation Party, and discontented conservative Liberal Senator Cory Bernardi left the party and established the Australian Conservatives soon after. The now elected Turnbull government secured passage of the Registered Organisations and Australian Building and Construction Commission legislation. In 2017, it announced Federal funds for expansion of Snowy Hydro. In June 2017, it introduced the "Gonski 2.0" reforms to schools funding. Factional strains continued.

Turnbull's ousting of Abbott had divided the Liberal Party rank and file and tensions continued in the parliamentary Party. Abbott said Turnbull supporters had plotted against him. The government reached the 30-consecutive-Newspoll-losses benchmark Turnbull had used to unseat Abbott, in April 2018. The Parliament faced a period of instability under the 2017–18 Australian parliamentary eligibility crisis, and the Turnbull government briefly lost its parliamentary majority and Deputy Prime Minister Joyce. Joyce was re-elected, but in February 2018 Turnbull denounced him and forced his resignation after the press reported on an office affair he had been conducting with a staffer. By-election losses in July 2018 further diminished Turnbull's authority. Dissent from conservative MPs over issues such as energy prices and immigration levels grew during Turnbull's final months. On 21 August, Turnbull announced a leadership spill ahead of his 39th consecutive Newspoll loss, which he narrowly won against Peter Dutton. Turnbull resigned three days later after narrowly losing the confidence of his Party room. Turnbull blamed Abbott, Dutton and conservative media commentators.

== Background ==
=== Malcolm Turnbull ===
Malcolm Turnbull entered Parliament as the Member for Wentworth in 2004, and went on to serve as Parliamentary Secretary to the Prime Minister from January 2006, and later Minister for the Environment and Water Resources in the Liberal-National coalition led by Prime Minister John Howard. Before entering Parliament, Turnbull had previously worked as a journalist, a barrister and a merchant banker. He also headed the Australian Republican Movement, and had been active in the failed "Yes" campaign for the 1999 republic referendum.

The Howard government was defeated at the 2007 federal election by the Australian Labor Party led by Kevin Rudd. In the aftermath, Turnbull entered and lost in the ensuing ballot for the Liberal Party leadership, which was won by Brendan Nelson. Turnbull served as Shadow Treasurer, before toppling Nelson in the November 2008 Liberal leadership spill.

The Godwin Grech Affair undermined Turnbull's authority, and amid extended poor polling, and disagreement within the Coalition over Turnbull's support for the Rudd government's climate change taxation policies, Turnbull was replaced as leader of the Liberals by Tony Abbott following a 2009 leadership spill. The Coalition's position in the polls was improved by the leadership change, and Abbott went on to lead the Coalition to the 2010 federal election (which resulted in a hung parliament) and to win the 2013 federal election, returning to power after six years in opposition. Turnbull served as Minister for Communications in the Abbott government, and oversaw the National Broadband rollout.

=== Turnbull challenges Abbott ===
The Abbott government delivered its election promises of removing industry taxes on mining and carbon emissions, and halting unauthorised boat arrivals, but its first Budget's expenditure cuts and surprise revenue proposals met with a hostile reception in the Senate and media. Monarchist Abbott's decision to knight the Duke of Edinburgh brought heavy media criticism, and amid declining poll numbers for the Coalition, rumours of an intention by republican Malcolm Turnbull to challenge for the leadership continued. On 5 February, Fairfax reported that leadership speculation was at "fever pitch" after backbench Senator Arthur Sinodinos (a demoted-Minister) questioned Abbott's judgement on Sky News and refused to confirm if the Prime Minister would still hold his job in a week's time. The following day, the ABC's 7.30 reported that "The tensions between the Prime Minister and the colleagues campaigning to oust him are heading to a showdown."

Liberal MPs Don Randall and Luke Simpkins called a February 2015 spill motion to spill the leadership positions of the party, though with no contender. The motion failed 61 to 39. Abbott reportedly asked the Liberal caucus to give him six months to improve the government's standing.

The ABC reported that in the lead up to the motion, the Abbott government had been facing "leaks and growing media criticism". In the months after the failed spill motion, leaking and backgrounding against Abbott continued, but polling for the Coalition initially improved. Following the Second Hockey Budget in May 2015, Newspoll placed Abbott's approval rating at an eight-month high, and in front of Opposition leader Bill Shorten as better prime minister for the first time in six months.

Final spill

On 14 September 2015, Turnbull announced that he would be challenging Abbott. Turnbull cited extended poor polling by the Abbott government and a need for a new style of "economic leadership" as reasons for mounting his challenge: "We have lost 30 Newspolls in a row. It is clear that the people have made up their mind about Mr Abbott's leadership", he said. In response, Abbott said that he was "dismayed by the destabilisation that's been taking place now for many, many months" and that Australia needed "strong and stable government and that means avoiding, at all costs, Labor's revolving-door prime ministership". A September 2015 leadership spill was called, with Turnbull challenging Abbott, and winning by 54 votes to 44, and Abbott supporter Kevin Andrews challenging Julie Bishop for the Liberal deputy position but losing 70–30.

==== Coalition agreement ====
Prior to the ballot, the Deputy Prime Minister, Warren Truss, noted in a news conference that the Coalition agreement between the Liberal Party and the Nationals was negotiated with Abbott and that any change in leader would require it to be renegotiated. Political commentators stated that senior Nationals senators disliked the way that Turnbull handled the carbon reduction policy in 2009, with other Nationals being "deeply upset" that Turnbull did not acknowledge the Nationals during his first press conference as Prime Minister-designate.

Despite these very early tensions, the Nationals ultimately struck a new Coalition agreement with Turnbull on 15 September, shortly before Turnbull was sworn in as prime minister. As part of the agreement, responsibility for water was transferred from Liberal Greg Hunt's environment portfolio to Nationals Barnaby Joyce's agriculture portfolio. The Nationals successfully negotiated a total of $4 billion worth of deals from Turnbull in exchange for a continued Coalition agreement. They also received assurances from Turnbull that he would maintain the policy positions of the Abbott government in relation to carbon pricing and in relation to requiring a plebiscite prior to any amendment to the Marriage Act to recognise same-sex unions as "marriages" under Australian law.

==== Challenge aftermath ====
Turnbull dropped Abbott, Joe Hockey, Eric Abetz, Ian Macfarlane, Kevin Andrews, Michael Ronaldson and Bruce Billson from his ministry, but increased the number of cabinet ministers from 19 to 21. Polling was initially favourable to Turnbull following the leadership change, but the Coalition faced internal tensions. By March 2016, Labor and the Coalition were back to 50–50 in Newspoll results. In his final address to the media as prime minister, Abbott expressed pride in the record of his government, but warned against a "poll-driven" political culture and unnamed media figures and politicians who would "connive at dishonour" by spreading anonymous, self-serving claims: "A febrile media culture has developed that rewards treachery" he said.

In the months following the leadership change, Coalition tensions remained. Liberal Party rank and file and backbench divisions emerged as a result of the replacement of an elected prime minister. Immigration Minister Dutton was excluded from the National Security Committee of Cabinet, reportedly over tensions between himself and Turnbull. In November, Fairfax reported: "Simmering tensions over the September leadership coup have flared up amid revelations Julie Bishop's chief of staff attended the meeting of Liberal MPs plotting against Tony Abbott on the night before the spill" as Abetz and Dutton called on Bishop to explain.

Former ministers Abetz and Andrews expressed some discontent at government direction, while Bruce Billson announced his retirement and Ian Macfarlane – with the support of Deputy Prime Minister Warren Truss – attempted to switch to the National Party, but the move was blocked by the Liberals. Hockey's seat of North Sydney went to a by-election, which saw a 12.84% swing against the Liberal Party.

Abbott criticised the leaders of the effort to bring him down, and promised "no sniping" in his final speech as prime minister. On 16 September, it was reported that Abbott intended to stay in parliament. As a backbencher, Abbott continued his commentary on the record of his government and on world affairs, particularly in relation to national security and the challenge posed by Islamist terrorism. Media critics accused Abbott of "sniping". In January 2016, Abbott announced his intention to recontest the seat of Warringah at the next election. He won the seat with 61.55% of the vote.

==== Turnbull's differences ====
On Turnbull's oft-cited key policy differences, climate change, republicanism and same-sex marriage, as well as wider policy generally, he stated his government would continue to follow the same policies of the Abbott government. Reflecting a change in the Abbott government stance concerning the Australian honours system, on 2 November 2015, Turnbull announced that the Queen approved the government's request to amend the Order's letters patent and cease awards as Knights and Dames in the Order of Australia after Cabinet agreed that the titles were no longer appropriate in the modern awards system.

== Ministry ==
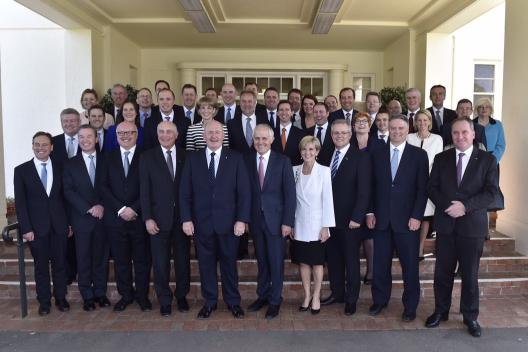
Governor-General Peter Cosgrove and Prime Minister Malcolm Turnbull pose with newly sworn in ministers on 21 September 2015.

Turnbull was sworn in as prime minister at around 1:30 pm AEST on 15 September 2015, by the Governor-General, Sir Peter Cosgrove, in a ceremony at Government House. Question Time for the House of Representatives was delayed until 2:30 pm AEST to accommodate this.

Turnbull announced his new ministry on 20 September. In an extensive reshuffle, he dropped Joe Hockey, Eric Abetz, Ian Macfarlane, Kevin Andrews, Michael Ronaldson and Bruce Billson, increased the number of liberals and decreased the number of conservatives in cabinet, female cabinet ministers rose from two to five, and Marise Payne was appointed as Australia's first female Minister for Defence. The number of cabinet ministers rose from 19 to 21. In addition to the Health and Sport portfolios which she held in the Abbott government, Sussan Ley was later appointed Minister for Aged Care.

=== Resignations and reshuffle ===
Within the first six months of the Turnbull government, a number of senior ministers resigned.

Briggs

Jamie Briggs served as Assistant Minister for Infrastructure and Regional Development in the Abbott government. An Abbott supporter, he reportedly injured his leg in a party in Abbott's office after Abbott was deposed as Prime Minister, and in which a table was damaged. Turnbull appointed Briggs Minister for Cities and the Built Environment (Turnbull had initially dumped Briggs from the ministry, but when Bruce Billson declined to accept a demotion, Briggs was reinstated. Following a late-night incident involving a female DFAT staffer in a Hong Kong bar during an official visit in November, Turnbull prompted Briggs to resign and Briggs subsequently quit the Turnbull Ministry on 29 December 2015. The Australian Financial Review reported "government sources" claiming Briggs was accused of sexual harassment.

Brough

Mal Brough was stood down from the ministry at the same time as Briggs resigned. Brough's standing down followed news that the Australian Federal Police were investigating him over an alleged copying of the diary of former speaker Peter Slipper. Brough had served as a Minister in the Howard government, but lost his seat in the 2007 election. He was re-elected at the 2013 federal election but Abbott had not re-appointed him to the Ministry, and Brough was a backer of the Turnbull leadership push.

Robb

Andrew Robb had served as Trade Minister in the Abbott government and oversaw free-trade negotiations for Abbott and Turnbull. He announced his retirement in February 2016, but remained assisting in the Trade portfolio. Steven Ciobo became Minister for Trade and Investment in his place.

Truss

On 11 February 2016, Deputy Prime Minister, Warren Truss, announced his decision to retire at the 2016 federal election and resigned with immediate effect as Parliamentary Leader of the National Party of Australia. Truss announced that he would resign from the Ministry.

Robert

On 12 February, it was reported that Stuart Robert was resigning from the ministry after an internal investigation, ordered by Turnbull, concluded that he had "acted inconsistently with the Statement of Ministerial Standards". The investigation was into a 2014 private trip to China during which Robert had met with a Chinese government minister at an agreement signing ceremony between Chinese and Australian companies.

Following these retirements and resignations, a ministerial reshuffle was announced on 13 February 2016. The new ministry, including Barnaby Joyce, who had been elected as leader of the National Party on 11 February and therefore became deputy prime minister, was sworn in on 18 February 2016. Fiona Nash, who had been elected as Deputy Leader of the Nationals, Darren Chester and Steve Ciobo moved into the cabinet. A range of other appointees to the outer ministry were also sworn in.

== First term of government 2015–2016 ==
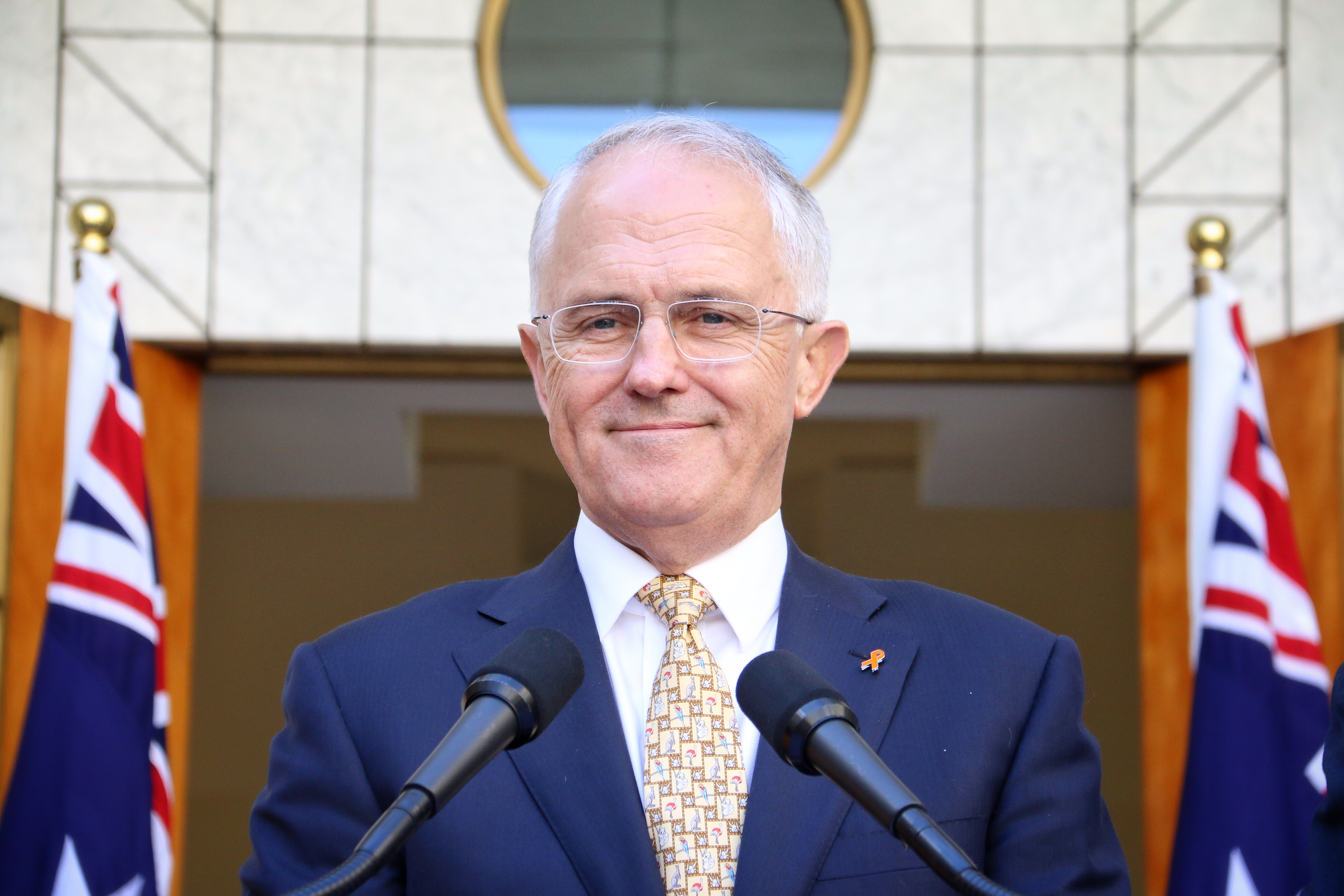
Prime Minister Malcolm Turnbull in March 2016

=== Climate change ===
Turnbull confirmed that his government would keep the emissions reductions targets set by the Abbott government. Under Turnbull, the Australian Renewable Energy Agency and Clean Energy Finance Corporation were transferred to the responsibility of the Department of Environment, which was seen as a sign that the agencies were going to be retained. Australia attended the 2015 United Nations Climate Change Conference and adopted the Paris Agreement. The agreement includes a review of emission reduction targets every 5 years from 2020.

=== Defence ===
During the term of the Abbott government, Australia had committed to supporting the US-led air campaign against IS in Iraq and Syria. Turnbull replaced Abbott supporter Kevin Andrews with Senator Marise Payne, who became Australia's first female Defence Minister, amid Australia's deployment to the Mid-East. Shortly after Turnbull took office, Russia commenced a separate military intervention in Syria, against opponents of Syrian president Bashar al-Assad. US Secretary of State John Kerry, criticised Russia's tactics and told the United Nations in response that "we are now in position with France, Australia, Canada, Turkey, and other coalition partners joining the campaign, to dramatically accelerate our efforts". on 27 October, Abbott criticised the lack of progress of the US–led Coalition on the ground. Turnbull said there were no "current" plans to change the nature of Australia's deployment to the conflict.

==== Terrorism ====
The ongoing threat of Islamist terrorism made its presence felt in Australia and abroad within the first months of the Turnbull government, with a shooting in Sydney, and major IS-inspired terror attacks in Paris, Beirut, Mali and elsewhere. Turnbull appointed Michael Keenan as Minister Assisting the Prime Minister for Counter Terrorism. Immigration Minister Dutton, an Abbott supporter, was excluded from the National Security Committee of Cabinet, reportedly over tensions between himself and Turnbull.

As Communications Minister in the Abbott government, Turnbull had distanced himself from the policy emphasis of Abbott by downplaying the threat of Islamic State to the wider world, saying the group was "not Hitler's Germany, Tojo's Japan or Stalin's Russia".

A 15-year-old Islamist shot and killed a police finance worker outside Parramatta Police Station on 2 October 2015. Turnbull called on Australians to show "mutual respect" following the murder.

Amid the deteriorating Syrian Civil War and following Germany's decision to open its borders to large numbers of asylum seekers, Tony Abbott delivered the Margaret Thatcher Lecture in London on 28 October, and urged Europe to look to the Australian example of border management, and for the international community to do more to resolve the Syrian conflict. In a joint conference with Turnbull on 13 November, the German Chancellor agreed "Solutions have to be found to allow the European Union to better protect its external borders", but Turnbull did not endorse Abbott's view. News Limited reported that Turnbull "delivered a slap-down to Tony Abbott for lecturing European leaders over their refugee policies as he arrived in Berlin" to meet with Chancellor Angela Merkel. Turnbull said "I have no intention or desire to give advice on these matters to the German Chancellor".

On the night of 13 November, a co-ordinated series of terrorist attacks were launched on Paris by IS sympathisers, and over 120 people were killed. Turnbull, still in Germany following his meeting with Merkel, expressed "resolute solidarity with people of France" and held a meeting of the National Security Committee of Cabinet. Turnbull said a political solution, not a military invasion was needed for Syria. France announced that the Paris attacks were an act of war and secured a UN Security Council Resolution authorising the use of military force against the Islamic State and the al-Nusra Front. In the aftermath of the attacks, some of the Turnbull Cabinet criticised the Sunni Grand Mufti of Australia for offering an apparently equivocal condemnation of the Paris attacks. Turnbull said he did not wish to "engage in a textual debate" from overseas.

=== Economic policy ===
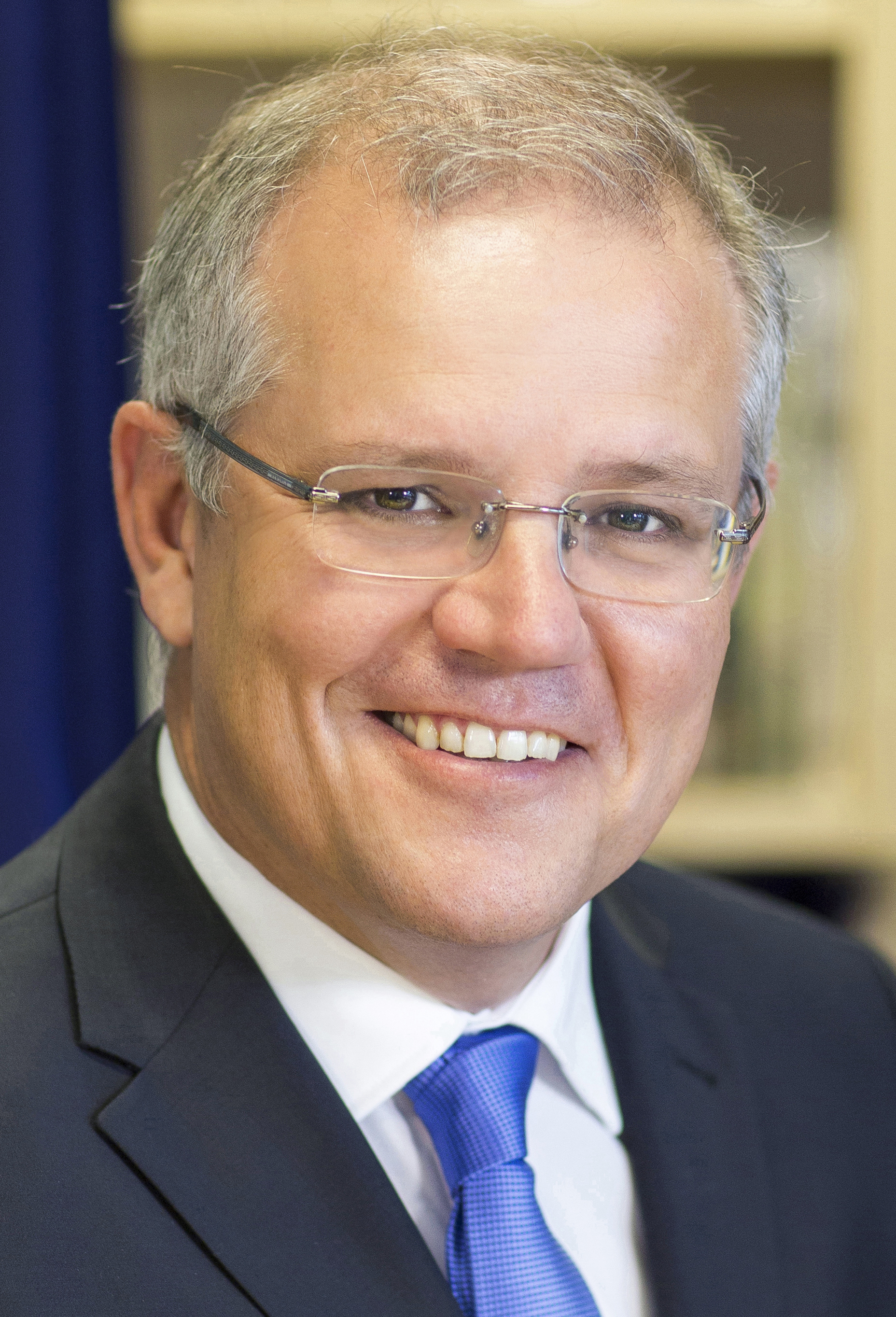
Scott Morrison replaced Joe Hockey as Treasurer of Australia in the Turnbull government.

One of the reasons Turnbull gave for challenging for the Liberal leadership was dissatisfaction with the economic message and tone of the Abbott government. In his first press conference as Prime Minister-designate, Turnbull said the government needed to build confidence in the Australian economy amongst the business community. Stephen Koukoulas of the progressive Per Capita think tank wrote for The Guardian that "economic growth is sluggish, unemployment is high, real wages are falling and consumer and business confidence are weak" and that Turnbull therefore had "a year to inject confidence and strength into the economy or else he will be swept from office and condemned to history as a wrecker of a first term Liberal government". In his first press conference as Treasurer, Scott Morrison indicated a reduction in government expenditure, and stated that the Mid-Year Economic and Fiscal Outlook (MYEFO) and White Paper on tax reform would arrive on time.

On 1 October 2015, Turnbull hosted an economic summit at Parliament House, which included representatives from industry, unions, government and the social sector. The three-hour meeting did not result in any policy commitments, but the participants agreed on the need for economic growth, returning to a budget surplus, increasing employment, investing in infrastructure and pushing for innovation and increased productivity.

The MYEFO was expected to include savings measures, as Morrison had stated that "any new spending must be fully offset", giving the examples of the Syrian refugee intake and Roads to Recovery. Deloitte Access Economics estimates that the new spending totals $5 billion since May. The government said it would remove bulk-billing incentives for pathology services and reduce incentives for MRI services. The social security and welfare payment integrity measures from the previous budget would be broadened to increase revenue.

==== Taxation ====
In the 2013 election campaign, Tony Abbott promised a "comprehensive tax white paper" to look at tax reform. In June 2014, Abbott launched the Reform of the Federation white paper, with an eye to clarifying "roles and responsibilities for states and territories so that they are as far as possible, sovereign in their own sphere". In March 2015, Joe Hockey launched the Abbott government's Tax White Paper titled "Re:think". After taking over the Prime Ministership, Turnbull intervened to delay the release of a tax green paper, and the Sydney Morning Herald reported: "According to bureaucrats, the green paper will now not be released until [2016], pending a full 'reset' on taxation policy and a rethink 'from the ground up'. In policy circles, that's regarded as code for the inclusion of the GST."

Initially, Turnbull confirmed that a GST increase was "on the table", stating that any increase in the GST would be offset by tax breaks and Morrison indicated that superannuation tax would be reviewed. Through in to 2016, Morrison made the case for an increase in the GST. In February, Turnbull ruled out pursuing a GST increase.

Two days before the 2016 Council of Australian Governments' (COAG) meeting, Turnbull responded to a leaked report regarding his plans for reforms to income tax levying. At a press conference at a Penrith football field, Turnbull announced a plan to hand the states income taxing powers, which he explained would be "the most fundamental reform to the federation in generations". State and Territory leaders rejected the plan outright, and Turnbull withdrew the initiative two days later following the COAG meeting.

=== Education ===
In the government's first major education policy decision, Education Minister Simon Birmingham announced that the Abbott government's proposed university deregulation plan would be postponed until at least 2017. Furthermore, Birmingham confirmed that any move to reform university funding would not be submitted to Parliament before the next election.

In the 2017 Australian federal budget, it was announced that university funding would be a reduced by 2.5%.; university fees would go up by $2,000 to $3,600 for a four-year course, an increase of 1.8% in 2018, and 7.5% by 2022; and from 1 July 2018, the income level at which HECS debt repayments start would be reduced, from $55,000 to $42,000.

In 2017 the Turnbull government commissioned David Gonski to chair an independent panel, the Review to Achieve Educational Excellence in Australian Schools, to examine evidence and make recommendations on how school funding should be used to improve school performance and student outcomes. This report, having followed an earlier report commissioned by the Gillard government and also chaired by Gonski between 2010 and 2013, was referred to as Gonski 2.0, and was published on 30 April 2018. The recommendations of the two Gonski reports were finally agreed by all states and territories from March 2025 in a new funding agreement with the Albanese government, lifting federal funding of public schools to 25 per cent from 20 per cent, under the Better and Fairer Schools Agreement (BFSA). Under the BFSA, states are required to increase their funding of public schools to 75 per cent of the minimum amount recommended by the 2012 Gonski Review and Gonski 2.0 per the SRS, meaning that they will be fully funded according to the Gonski model.

=== Foreign Affairs and Trade ===
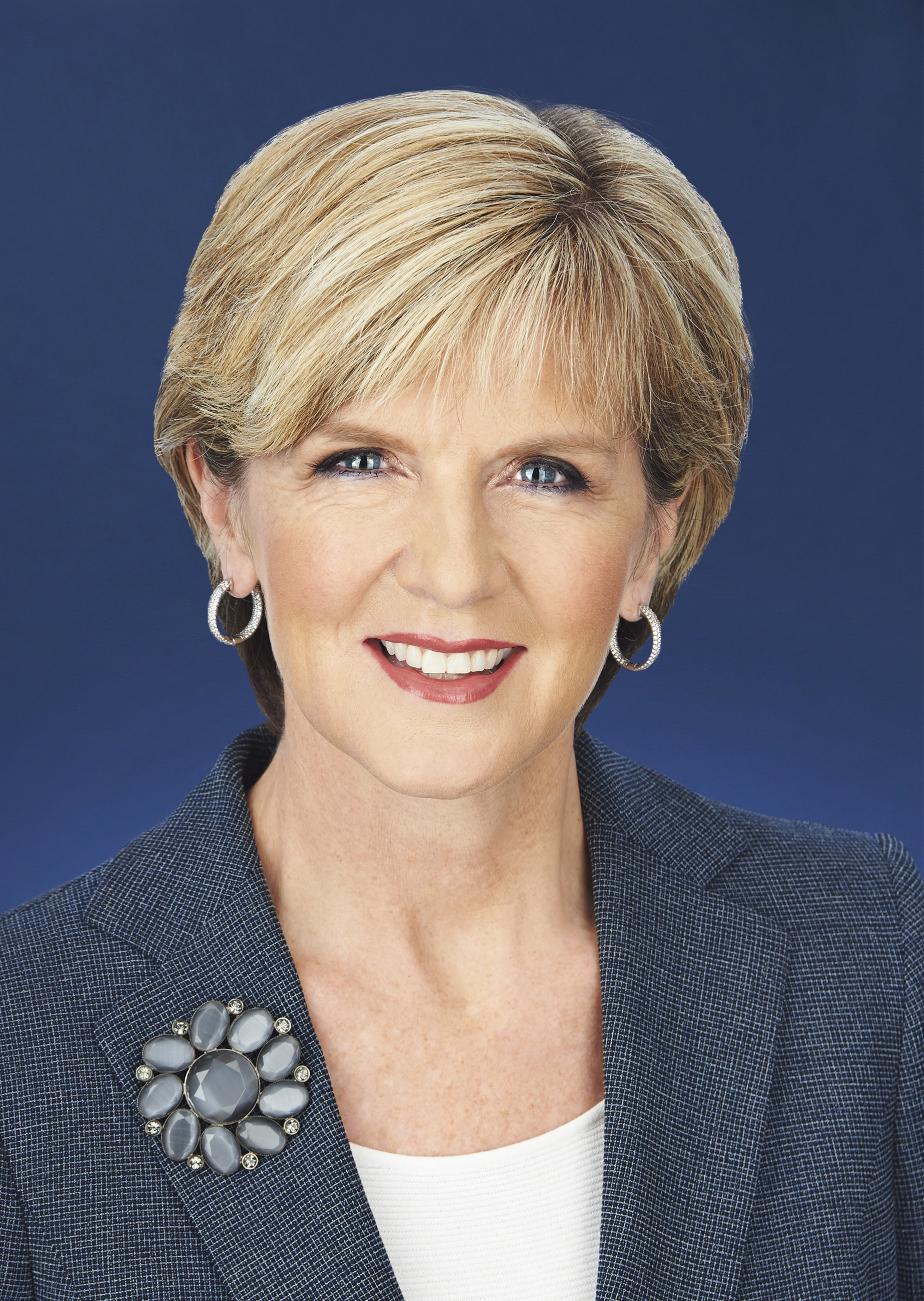
Julie Bishop retained the positions of Liberal deputy leader and Minister for Foreign Affairs in the Turnbull government

Julie Bishop backed Turnbull's replacement of Tony Abbott as prime minister and retained the post of Minister for Foreign Affairs in the Turnbull government. Andrew Robb supported Abbott, but remained Minister for Trade and Investment until announcing his retirement in February 2016. He was replaced by Steven Ciobo.

Malcolm Turnbull's first overseas visit as prime minister was to New Zealand, in October 2015, where he met with Prime Minister John Key and discussed immigration rules. In November, he embarked on a five-nation tour and attended major leaders' summits in Europe and Asia.

Trade

The China–Australia Free Trade Agreement agreed by the Abbott government concluded its passage through Parliament in October 2015. The Turnbull government continued the Abbott government's negotiations for an India Free Trade deal. Turnbull also continued the Abbott government's moves to improve trade relations with Indonesia and Germany, and to establish the Trans-Pacific Partnership (TPP). Turnbull met with Indonesian president Joko Widodo and German Chancellor Angela Merkel on his November 2015 world tour and discussed trade. Andrew Robb signed the TPP in February 2016.

=== Health ===
Health minister, Sussan Ley sought feedback on private health insurance. Hepatitis C treatments were subsidised from March 2016 under the Pharmaceutical Benefits Scheme. On 13 January 2017, Turnbull announced that Ley had resigned from the ministry, following an expenses scandal. Greg Hunt was appointed as Ley's replacement as the Minister for Health and Sport, and Ken Wyatt was appointed Assistant Minister for Health and Minister for Indigenous Health and Aged Care, both with effect from 24 January 2017.

==== Women's Safety Package ====
On 24 September 2015, shortly after Turnbull became prime minister, he, together with the Minister for Women, Michaelia Cash, announced a "$100 million package of measures designed to provide a safety net for women and children at high risk of experiencing violence". Minister Cash also suggested that the government was considering denying American singer Chris Brown a visa due to his highly publicised domestic violence offence in 2009. Turnbull stated that Cash had "very brilliantly expressed the thoughts of the government". Brown was later denied entry to Australia.

=== Immigration ===
Peter Dutton, an Abbott supporter, retained his position as Minister for Immigration, following Turnbull's replacement of Abbott as Liberal leader.

==== Refugees and asylum seekers ====
Under Operation Sovereign Borders, the maritime people-smuggling trade and associated deaths at sea was halted during the term of the Abbott government. When Turnbull took office, 1,600 asylum seekers and refugees remained at Nauru and Papua New Guinea's Manus Island awaiting processing or resettlement. Turnbull expressed sympathy for these remaining asylum seekers, but indicated he would continue the bi-partisan policy whereby they would not be resettled in Australia.

On 28 September, 7.30 reported that an asylum seeker at Nauru was making allegations of rape. The pregnant woman, "Abyan", asked the government to allow her to come to Australia for an abortion, which is illegal on Nauru, and she arrived on 11 October. The Guardian reported that she feared being sent back to Nauru and asked for counselling, which she said she was not granted before being returned to Nauru. Turnbull said "Abyan" was returned to Nauru because she changed her mind about having the procedure. Dutton said that "Abyan" had decided not to proceed with the termination, however this was disputed by her representation. Dutton said some advocates were fabricating information, while others were using the case for their "political agenda". The United Nations High Commissioner for Human Rights subsequently called for "Abyan" to receive further assistance. "Abyan" was brought back to Australia for an abortion for a second time in late 2015, but subsequently didn't have an abortion and instead gave birth in Australia in May 2016.

As Australia prepared to accept 12,000 refugees from the Syrian conflict, the United Nations Secretary General Ban Ki-moon met with Turnbull at the 2015 ASEAN Summit and criticised the Turnbull government's offshore asylum seeker processing regime. Ban reportedly expressed concern over the detention conditions in Australia's offshore processing centres, and encouraged Turnbull to reconsider Operation Sovereign Borders.

=== Industrial Relations ===
The Royal Commission into Trade Union Governance and Corruption had been established by the Abbott government. In December 2015, its Final Report, despite having found only one case of corruption, recommended a new national regulator with the same powers as the Australian Securities and Investments Commission be established to combat corruption in the trade union movement. In response, Turnbull said the report was a "watershed moment" for unions, and that union reform would be an election issue if the Senate blocked reforms to trade union governance and oversight.

Labor, the Greens and part of the crossbench combined in the Senate to block efforts to re-establish the Australian Building and Construction Commission (ABCC) to combat corruption in the construction industry. In March, Turnbull vowed to call a 2 July double dissolution election if the bill was blocked. Turnbull took the unusual step of asking the Governor-General to prorogue Parliament and both Houses were recalled on 18 April to consider and pass the Australian Building and Construction Commission bills and the Registered Organisations Bill. The Senate voted down the bills, and a double dissolution election was set for 2 July.

=== Infrastructure ===
Turnbull committed $95 million to the Gold Coast light rail project. The Turnbull government set itself a deadline of December 2016 to choose a single site to store Australia's nuclear waste. Proposed locations included near Sallys Flat in New South Wales; Hale in the Northern Territory; Cortlinye, Pinkawillinie and Barndioota in South Australia; and Oman Ama in Queensland.

=== Media and Communications ===
Turnbull selected Mitch Fifield as Communications Minister. The Turnbull government moved to reform Keating-era media ownership laws, in a move that could allow mergers of major TV networks and print media. The changes abolished a rule preventing mergers between regional television networks and their metropolitan affiliates, and a rule which prevented any one proprietor from owning a newspaper, radio station and television network in the same major market.

==== Media relations ====
Turnbull served as Minister for Communications in the Abbott government. Turnbull criticised Abbott's request for his Ministers to boycott the Q&A program over perceived "left wing bias" and the Zaky Mallah Affair. Turnbull told the ABC 7.30 program during the boycott that "I take the view that wherever there is an open microphone I'm happy to get on the other side of it."

After taking office from Abbott, Turnbull boycotted the 2GB and 4BC radio networks, after he was criticised by their high-rating conservative commentators Alan Jones, Andrew Bolt, Ben Fordham and Ray Hadley. Turnbull's ascension to the Liberal leadership was welcomed by ABC political commentators Kerry O'Brien, Barrie Cassidy, Fran Kelly and Paul Bongiorno. By April 2016, Turnbull had conducted 17 interviews at the ABC, and none at 2GB. Fairfax political commentator Mark Kenny called Turnbull the Coalition's "best electoral asset."

=== Same-sex marriage ===
Turnbull confirmed that his government would retain the Coalition policy of allowing Australians to vote in a non-binding plebiscite on same-sex marriage, loosely scheduled for late 2016. Following the announcement that the plebiscite would be pushed back to February 2017, the issue caused significant divisions within the government. Turnbull introduced the legislation to establish the plebiscite on the 1-year anniversary of his prime ministership and oversaw the passage of the legislation through the House of Representatives, but the bill was defeated in the Senate. Turnbull refused to rule out the prospect of a free vote being held on legislation to legalise same-sex marriage, though some argued Turnbull's leadership and the stability of the coalition agreement between the Liberal and National Party government would be threatened by such a move.

Following defeat of the plebiscite legislation in the Senate, Turnbull confirmed the government had "no plans to take any other measures on this issue". In August 2017, following an attempt by five Liberal Party MPs to change party policy and have a free vote in the parliament on same-sex marriage legislation, the government announced it would move for a voluntary postal plebiscite to be held later that year. This would only occur in the event the government's compulsory plebiscite legislation was again rejected by the Senate. That occurred on 9 August 2017, when a government-initiated motion in the Senate to debate the Plebiscite (Same-Sex Marriage) Bill 2016 was tied at 31-31; resulting in the motion being negatived. Following the result in the Senate, the government directed the Australian Statistician to begin the process of collecting statistical information on a voluntary basis, from all Australians on the electoral roll, as to their views on same sex marriage.

=== Safe Schools Program ===
The Safe Schools Program, created to combat LGBT bullying in schools, was reviewed by the government after Coalition backbenchers, George Christensen and Cory Bernardi, raised concerns over what they claimed was the "sexualised" nature of the program. On 9 February 2016, The Australian newspaper reported claims that a "gay manual" was being pushed in schools. A spokesperson for the Australian Christian Lobby stated that the program pressured kids and "confuses them about their own identity". Kevin Donnelly, a senior research fellow at the Australian Catholic University described the program as "social engineering". Christensen likened the program to a "pedophile grooming a victim", and said the program was attempting to run "queer gender theory" and "marxist ideology" into schools that should be limited to universities. Coalition MPs in disagreement such as Warren Entsch said the concerns were being pushed by external lobby groups. Labor leader Bill Shorten labelled the Christensen group "ideologues ... trying to impose a 1950s view of the world".

The government was quick to adopt changes to the program further than the review recommended, announced on 18 March 2016, after 43 of 123 federal Coalition parliamentarians including Abbott had signed a petition. Christensen said afterward: "I still am yet to see the response from the Safe Schools Coalition because we are talking about fundamentally altering what they have proposed and what they have proposed I think was disastrous for schoolchildren so if they reject what the government's put forward then the funding will just be suspended".

=== Senate reforms ===
Following the 2013 election, the Abbott government announced it would investigate changing the electoral system for the Senate. On 22 February 2016, the Turnbull government announced the following proposed changes:

- Group voting tickets would be abolished.
- Instead, voters could put parties in order of preference, "above the line". Above and below the line voting would be Optional Preferential. For above the line, voters will be told to write at least their first six preferences, however, a "savings provision" would be put in place if less than six were given. As a result, fewer votes would be classed informal, however, more ballots would "exhaust" as a result (i.e. some people would find that their vote was not counted towards electing any candidate). For below the line, voters would be told and required to write at least their first 12 preferences.
- More mistakes would be allowed below the line before a vote was declared informal.
- Parties would be able to put their distinctive logo on the ballot sheet.

The changes had the support of the Liberal/National Coalition, the Australian Greens, and Nick Xenophon − a three-vote majority.

The Senate reform legislation passed both houses of the Parliament of Australia on 18 March 2016.

== Polling ==
Approval ratings of Malcolm Turnbull as Prime Minister View source data.

Turnbull had nominated the Abbott government's performance in Newspoll as one of the major reasons for his challenge to Abbott. The poll initially favoured the Coalition following the replacement of Abbott, but by April 2016, it had re-entered negative territory.

=== 2015 ===
The government had been substantially and consistently trailing the Bill Shorten-led Labor opposition on the two-party-preferred vote for nearly two years, with Abbott and Shorten regularly swapping the lead for Preferred Prime Minister. Though the first Preferred Prime Minister poll after the successful spill, conducted by Roy Morgan Research, saw Turnbull record a massive 70 percent honeymoon result with Shorten on just 24 per cent, the first two-party poll, conducted by ReachTEL, saw only a three-point shift to the government, producing a 50–50 result.

In a Fairfax/Ipsos poll released on 19 October 2015, the Coalition led Labor for the first time since March 2014. Turnbull also substantially led Shorten as the preferred prime minister.

A 4–6 December 2015 Newspoll conducted from Friday to Sunday (with the 2015 North Sydney by-election occurring on the Saturday) saw a continued 53-47 two-party vote to the government, however Turnbull's personal ratings were significantly lessened, with personal approval down eight to 52 percent and personal disapproval up eight to 30 percent. Some News Limited journalists opined Turnbull's honeymoon to be over.

By March 2016, Labor and the Coalition were back to 50–50 in Newspoll results. In April, Turnbull lost his lead over Labor, and the Coalition trailed 51–49.

== By-elections ==
Canning

Turnbull challenged Abbott for the Liberal leadership in the week leading to the 2015 Canning by-election. The by-election was held on 19 September, days after the Turnbull government took office. Andrew Hastie retained the seat for the Liberals, despite having to rely on preferences after a substantial primary (−4.15%) and two-party (−6.55%) swing away from the Liberals. Double-digit swings did eventuate among the northern suburban booths. The Canning Liberal margin was reduced from safe to marginal status.

Turnbull supporter Arthur Sinodinos told the ABC's Insiders program that the swing was a better result than the party expected at the beginning of the campaign. Abbott told 2GB radio that Liberal Party internal polling in fact showed the Party was going to end up with 57 per cent of the two-party preferred vote: "One of the reasons why the ballot had to be brought on the week it was brought on by the proponents of a ballot was because a strong result in Canning which is what we were going to get, would have put paid to this notion that somehow I was unelectable because of the polls," he said. While public polling suggested a tighter result, The West Australian reported that Liberal Party federal director Brian Loughnane had polling predicting a 57–43 split in Canning before Abbott lost the leadership.

North Sydney

The resignation of outgoing Treasurer Joe Hockey triggered the 2015 North Sydney by-election which was won by Liberal candidate Trent Zimmerman, a controversially pre-selected, former Hockey staffer, with a 48.2 percent primary vote after a larger than predicted 12.8 percent swing against the Turnbull Coalition government. This was only the second time in North Sydney since federation that the successful Liberal candidate did not obtain a majority of the primary vote and had to rely on preferences after a large double-digit primary vote swing − more than triple that of the 2015 Canning by-election − all in the absence of a Labor candidate, whom have never been successful in the safe Liberal seat.

The Liberal two-candidate vote of 60.2 percent against independent Stephen Ruff compares to the previous election vote of 65.9 percent against Labor. The reduction of 5.7 percent cannot be considered a "two-party/candidate preferred swing" − when a major party is absent, preference flows to both major parties does not take place, resulting in asymmetric preference flows.

Amid claims of "widespread discontent for the Liberal pre-selection factional fix of Trent Zimmerman" and in the absence of a Labor candidate, Hockey's predecessor, former independent North Sydney MP Ted Mack, announced he would steer the campaign of independent candidate Stephen Ruff, who had the support of some disgruntled Liberal supporters. Mack stated "I've never seen an election where a Liberal candidate is so disliked by such a lot of Liberal members and Liberal voters". Leaked emails showed potential voters were sent registration forms at 7:30 pm on a Thursday and asked to signal their availability, with the cut-off for replying by noon the next day, and additionally, advance notice of the e-mail and cut-off was provided to Zimmerman's backers. It was claimed up to 550 Liberal branch members were unable to vote after the Liberal state executive pushed through a shortened pre-selection process to select Zimmerman, who is also head of the body that sets the rules for Liberal pre-selections, which has been claimed as a "complete conflict of interest". Mack also claimed that much of the electorate was angered that Hockey, who penned the "age of entitlement" speech, had forced a $1-million by-election within a year of the 2016 federal election, with the expectation of becoming the next Ambassador of Australia to the United States. The expectation was confirmed on 8 December 2015. In the last week of the campaign, the Liberal party room suffered from the defection of Ian Macfarlane to the National party room with accompanying demands for additional Nationals cabinet representation, and additionally, the Mal Brough James Ashby diary controversy deepened, and combined with the unexpected by-election swing and Turnbull's significantly lessened personal ratings in the concurrent December Newspoll, some News Limited journalists opined Turnbull's honeymoon to be over.

== 2016 federal election ==
The April 2016 refusal of the Senate to pass the government's bill to re-establish an anti-corruption watchdog for the construction industry provided Turnbull with a double dissolution trigger. The election was held on 2 July, and after an extended eight-week official campaign period, the Coalition was re-elected with its majority in the House of Representatives reduced to one seat. Turnbull had suffered around a 3.5% swing against the Coalition.

=== New Senate ===
The Turnbull government had reformed the Senate electoral prior to the double-dissolution poll and the newly elected senate had a different complexion to that which the Abbott government had faced. The Coalition suffered a 2.5% swing against it, retaining 30 Senate seats. Labor won 26 and the Greens 9. The Palmer United Party lost all representation, though its former member Jacqui Lambie was returned as a member of the Jacqui Lambie Network. Journalist Derryn Hinch took a seat for Derryn Hinch's Justice Party. Nick Xenophon was joined by two members of the newly formed Nick Xenophon Team. One Nation returned to the Senate with four members including party leader Pauline Hanson, who had lost office as a lower house MP in 1998. Family First and the Liberal Democrats won a seat each.

==== Bernardi defection ====
On 7 February 2017, Coalition Senator Cory Bernardi announced that he would be leaving the Liberal Party to form his own party, the Australian Conservatives.

== Second term of government 2016–2018 ==
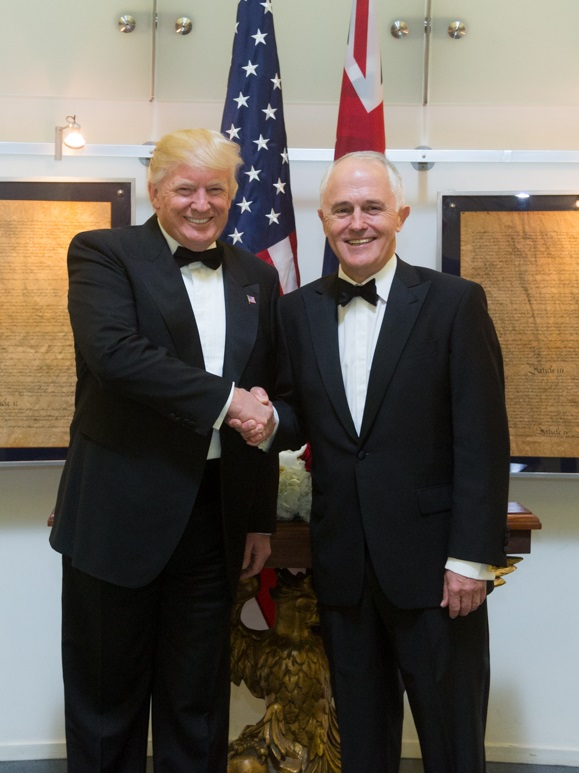
Turnbull (right) and USA President Donald Trump (left) in New York City, May 2017

=== Cashless Welfare Card ===
In March 2016, trials of the Cashless Welfare Card began in Ceduna, South Australia, following a 2014 report by Andrew Forrest into Indigenous jobs and training.

=== Parliamentary performance ===
In the first sitting week of parliament, the Turnbull government lost a vote on a procedural motion in of the House of Representatives, this was the first time in fifty years that a majority government had done so. The Labor Party was able to defeat the government on the floor of the house due to the absence of several government MPs. Following the incident Turnbull "read the riot act" to the MPs who left early.

=== Industrial Relations ===
After winning election in 2016, the Coalition was able to secure passage of the Registered Organisations and Australian Building and Construction Commission legislation with the support of the new cross-bench. The Abbott and first Turnbull governments had faced strong opposition to the bills from Labor and the Greens in the Senate. The ABCC bill was designed to re-establish the Australian Building and Construction Commission in order to tackle illegal behaviour on construction sites and to improve productivity. The registered organisation bill was designed to create a registered organisations commission to oversee the governance of union and employer bodies and bring standards for trade union officials into line with those applying to company directors under Corporations Law.

The refusal of the Senate to pass the government's bills provided Turnbull with a double dissolution trigger, and the matters formed part of the Coalition's push for re-election at the 2016 poll. Labor and the Greens continued to oppose the bills, however with a new cross-bench in place, the Registered Organisation bill passed the Senate on 22 November and the Australian Building and Construction Commission bill passed on 30 November 2016.

=== Backpacker tax ===
The backpacker tax passed the upper house with support from The Greens. The tax rate was settled at 15% and the backpacker superannuation tax rate was set at 65%.

The rates affect anyone on a 417 or 462 visa to Australia.

=== Debt recovery controversy ===
In 2016 Centrelink began reconciling welfare recipient's records against data from the Australian Taxation Office. In a process that had previously seen 20,000 debt recovery letters issued per year, this new automated data-matching technique, with less human oversight, saw that number increase to 169,000 letters during July-Dec 2016. Opponents of the automated process say that errors in the system have led to welfare recipients paying nonexistent debts or debts that are larger than what they actually owe. Some welfare recipients have been required to make payments while contesting their debts.

In some cases, the debts being pursued dated back further than the Australian Taxation Office requests that Australians retain their documentation. The onus was moved from Centrelink needing to verify the information, to being on the individual to prove they did not owe the funds, with human interaction being very limited in the dispatch of the debt letters.

The process however was touted to save the government $300m, and as such has now been considered for recovery action against the Aged Pension and Disability Pension, which may recover $1b.

The program was the subject of a Senate committee inquiry.

Appearing before the Senate committee inquiry, the department was asked how many people had become deceased after receiving a letter under the debt recovery program. After the question was taken on notice, the department was asked again in a subsequent inquiry hearing, and it was again taken on notice.

=== Section 18C of the Racial Discrimination Act ===
Members of the Turnbull government have proposed less significant and narrower changes to section 18C, and the Attorney-General, George Brandis, has asked for the Joint Parliamentary Committee on Human Rights to conduct an inquiry on the appropriateness of section in its current form. In March 2016, the Australian Law Reform Commission called for review of section 18C, stating "In particular, there are arguments that s18C lacks sufficient precision and clarity, and unjustifiably interferes with freedom of speech by extending to speech that is reasonably likely to ‘offend’." The ALRC noted that it had received "widely divergent views" on whether s 18C should be amended but found as follows:

"In the ALRC's view, s 18C of the RDA would benefit from more thorough review in relation to implications for freedom of speech. In particular, there are arguments that s 18C lacks sufficient precision and clarity, and unjustifiably interferes with freedom of speech by extending to speech that is reasonably likely to ‘offend’. In some respects, the provision is broader than is required under international law, broader than similar laws in other jurisdictions, and may be susceptible to constitutional challenge." In 2016, Labor Senator Kimberley Kitching, said she was "very surprised" when Justice Bromberg decided to hear the Bolt case given, "He was an active ALP person, he was active enough that he was in a faction, he ran for preselection... Obviously he would have had some views about [Andrew Bolt], and perhaps he was not the best person to hear [the] case." Bromberg had run unsuccessfully for Labor preselection in Melbourne in 2001.

In November, 2016, the president of the Human Rights Commission Gillian Triggs voiced support for changes to 18C, saying that removing the words "offend" and "insult" and inserting "vilify" would strengthen the laws.

On 30 March 2017, the Australian Senate voted down changes to 18c with 31 votes; Labor, Greens, Lambie, Xenophon voting against and 28 votes Liberal, Derryn Hinch, One Nation, and Liberal Democrat for.

=== Energy policy ===
Since the 2016 election, the Turnbull government has followed prior Coalition government energy policies. This involves the wholesale dismissal of renewable energy targets and emissions intensity schemes. This only hardened when South Australia faced large blackouts which Turnbull had blamed on the state's 'ambitious' renewable energy target. In response to the gas and energy crisis that occurred in March 2017, Malcolm Turnbull announced a 50% increase in the capacity of Snowy Hydro through 'pumped hydro' technology.

In April 2017, Turnbull announced that he would use the Commonwealth government's powers to place export restrictions on the nation's liquified natural gas ("LNG") industry. He announced that these changes were in response to the high wholesale gas prices that were a result of a shortage of gas in the domestic gas market and that it was 'unacceptable' that domestic prices were so high, indicating a consequence of these restrictions would be a decrease in the wholesale gas price. The multinational gas companies and the gas industry association heavily criticised the policy saying that it would neither increase supply or reduce the wholesale price of gas.

In June 2017, the "Independent Review into the Future Security of the National Electricity Market" (also known as the Finkel Review) was released. The report was commissioned during an extraordinary meeting on 7 October 2016, where COAG energy ministers agreed that an independent review of the Australian National Energy Market by the Office of the Chief Scientist at the time, Alan Finkel.

This report has spurred much debate and discussion of future energy policy which has yet to be determined. Chief proponents of the report point towards the pragmatic "technology-agnostic" approach taken by Finkel, which supports the use of a mix of base-load non-renewable energy sources (coal and gas) with intermittent renewable energy sources (i.e., wind, solar) while chief opponents say the review does not go far enough in its support for renewable energy sources. A National Energy Guarantee was proposed.

In August 2018, facing internal and external opposition, Turnbull dropped the emissions targets from the National Energy Guarantee. This led to a widespread opinion that the policy was dead.

=== Leadership ===
In June 2017, a leaked tape emerged of Turnbull loyalist Christopher Pyne telling a gathering of "moderate" Liberals that most senior cabinet ministers including George Brandis and Marise Payne were in his left faction, and that they were working to secure "marriage equality" and had always backed Turnbull. Ousted Prime Minister Abbott described the comments as a "confession" Pyne had plotted against him.

=== Parliamentary eligibility crisis ===
On 25 July 2017, Matt Canavan resigned from Cabinet over doubts as to his eligibility to be a member of the parliament, after discovering that he was considered by the Italian authorities to be a citizen of Italy. This followed the resignations of the Greens Senators Scott Ludlam and Larissa Waters for being dual citizens. Dual citizens are generally ineligible to be elected or sit as a member of parliament under section 44 of the Australian Constitution. Barnaby Joyce took on Canavan's portfolio.

In July 2017, Julia Banks' Greek heritage led to her being one of several members of parliament to come under scrutiny over the possibility that they held another citizenship by descent. Dual citizens are generally ineligible to be elected or sit as a member of parliament under section 44 of the Australian Constitution. The Liberal Party moved to investigate and clarify Banks' citizenship status, as her seat in the House of Representatives is critical to the Turnbull government's one-seat majority. The Liberal Party later stated that it confirmed with the Greek Embassy in Australia that Banks is not registered as a Greek citizen.

On 14 August 2017, Barnaby Joyce announced that he had received advice from the New Zealand High Commission that he could possibly hold New Zealand citizenship by descent from his father. Joyce has asked the government to refer him to the High Court sitting as the Court of Disputed Returns, for consideration and clarification of his eligibility alongside that of Senators Ludlam, Waters, Canavan and Malcolm Roberts. On 17 August 2017, Nationals deputy leader, Senator Fiona Nash revealed that she had British citizenship by descent through her Scottish father. She elected not to step down from leadership or cabinet while she is referred to the High Court.

The Court handed down its decision in Canberra on 27 October 2017. It ruled unanimously that Joyce, Ludlam, Nash, Roberts and Waters had been ineligible to be elected and that Canavan and Xenophon had been eligible.

The Turnbull government lost its one-seat majority in the House of Representatives. The 2017 New England by-election was held on 2 December 2017. On 11 November 2017, John Alexander resigned due to his dual UK-Australian citizenship. He renounced his UK citizenship and re-contested the Bennelong by-election as the Liberal Party candidate. By mid-December 2017, Turnbull government had won both by-elections, thereby regaining their governing majority in the House of Representatives.

In May 2018 the High Court ruled against the eligibility of Labor MP Katy Gallagher, which prompted a series of resignations of other MPs in similar situations. A "Super Saturday" of five by-elections (held in the Divisions of Braddon, Fremantle, Longman, Mayo, and Perth) was held on 28 July, in which the Liberal Party failed to win any seats.

=== Same-sex marriage plebiscite ===
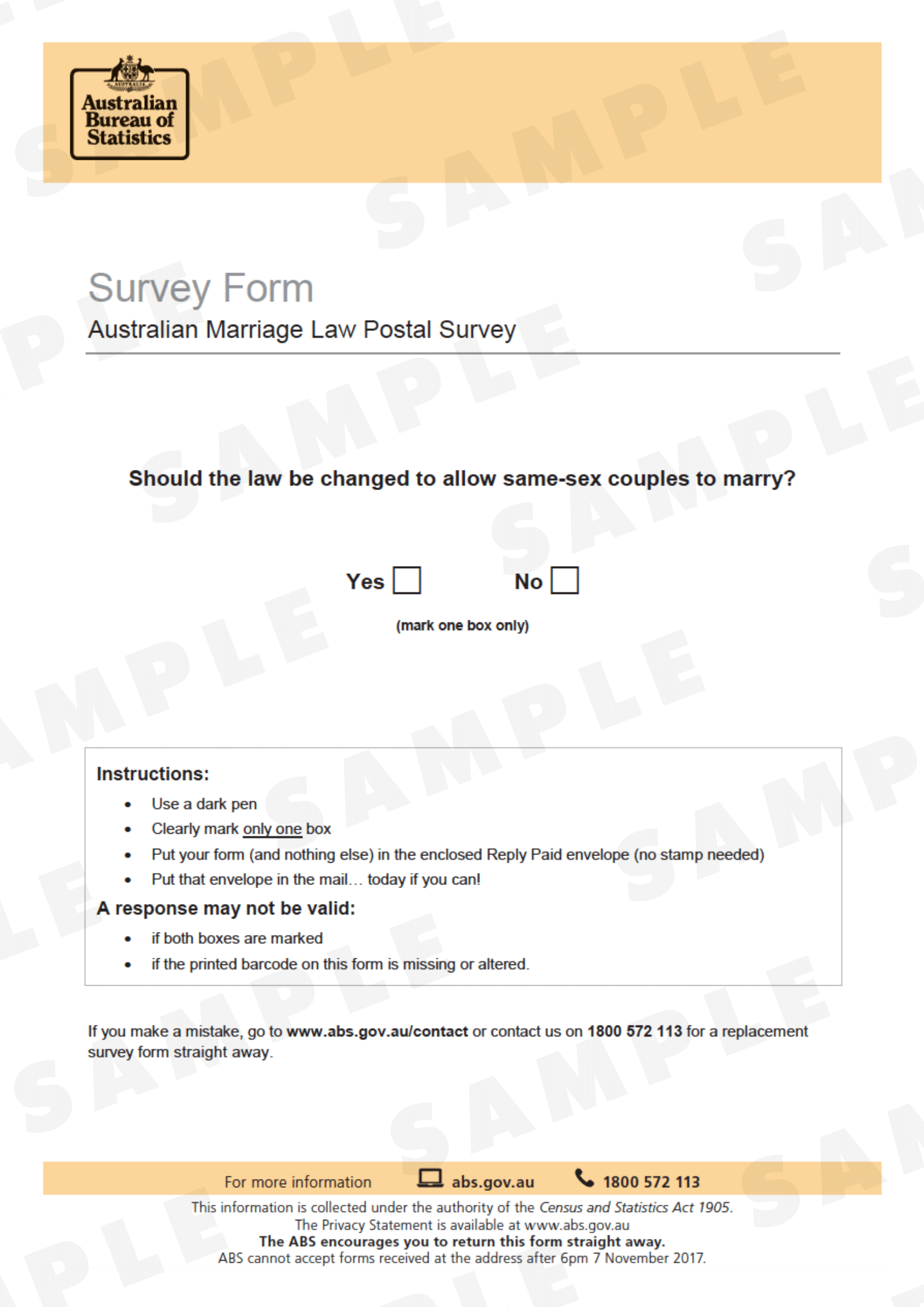
Sample survey form

The Abbott government had promised to hold a national vote to settle the question of whether marriage should continue to be defined by Australian law as being for male-female partnerships. Turnbull took the policy of holding a compulsory-attended plebiscite on the issue to the 2016 federal election. Following the election, the Coalition put the proposal to Parliament, but it was blocked by Labor and the Greens in the Senate in a vote of 7 November 2016. In August 2017, following an attempt by five Liberal Party MPs to change party policy and have a free vote in the parliament on same-sex marriage legislation, the government announced it would move for a voluntary postal plebiscite to be held later that year. This would only occur in the event the government's compulsory plebiscite legislation was again rejected by the Senate. That occurred on 9 August 2017, when a government-initiated motion in the Senate to debate the Plebiscite (Same-Sex Marriage) Bill 2016 was tied at 31-31; resulting in the motion being negatived.

Following the result in the Senate, the government directed the Australian Statistician to begin the process of collecting statistical information on a voluntary basis, from all Australians on the electoral roll, as to their views on same sex marriage. The government contended that this proposal did not require legislative approval from the parliament, arguing that the provisions of the Appropriations Act and the law governing the Australian Bureau of Statistics (ABS) enabled it to use the ABS for such a purpose. The government announced the ABS would be assisted by having staff seconded from the Australian Electoral Commission (AEC), the organisation responsible for the elections in Australia and managing the electoral roll.

Coalition MPs were permitted to campaign for either side in the debate, while Labor MPs were bound to support their Party's policy supporting change. 79.5% of voters participated in the survey, and 61.6 per cent of respondents voted Yes, with 38.4 per cent against. Out of 150 Federal Electoral Divisions, 133 recorded a majority Yes response, with 17 divisions voting No–mostly working class and migrant suburbs in Sydney electorates. The Turnbull government's same sex marriage legislation then passed the Senate on 29 November 2017, and same-sex couples became entitled to marry under Australian law.

=== Media Reforms ===
On 14 September the governments bill to media passed with the support of One Nation and Nick Xenophon (by a vote of 31–27). Under the changes the two-out-of-three rule will be scrapped, allowing a company to own a TV station, newspaper and radio station in a single market. The "reach rule", which prevented a single TV broadcaster from reaching more than 75 per cent of the population, will also go.

=== Banking Royal Commission ===
In late 2017, as a backlash against the legalisation of same sex marriage, the Nationals threatened to introduce a private members bill calling for a commission of inquiry into the banking system. It was reported that the bill would be co-sponsored by the Nationals, Labor, the Greens and Senate crossbench parties. Nationals Senator Barry O'Sullivan, and LNP MPs George Christensen and Llew O'Brien, together with the Greens, Labor, and Senate crossbench parties, had enough numbers to force the Turnbull government's opposition to a royal commission.

Turnbull and Treasurer Morrison announced plans for a royal commission.

=== NBN ===
Tony Abbott, as Leader of the Opposition, and Malcolm Turnbull, as Shadow Minister for Communications and Broadband, stated in 2010 that in government they would 'demolish' the NBN.

With the election of the Abbott government in 2013, rollout of Fibre to the Premises was limited to those areas already in development with a delay on new development imposed as Turnbull (then Minister for Communications) appointed a number of committees to advise him on future directions. Later implementation of the Multi-Technological Mix (MTM) began with the promise of earlier completion and significant cost savings compared to the earlier approach. The predominant change was the adoption of a mixed copper-optical technology with Fibre to the Node (FTTN)

The NBN network, at 2017, draws together wired communication: copper, optical and hybrid fibre-coaxial; and radio communication: satellite and fixed wireless networks at 121 Points of Interconnect (POI) typically located in Telstra owned telephone exchanges throughout Australia. It also sells access for mobile telecommunication backhaul to mobile telecommunications providers.

nbn has stated that there is no significant demand for wired connections above 25 Mbit/s and consideration of upgrading the network will not be undertaken until demand for high-bandwidth services is proven.

Bill Morrow, CEO of NBN Co, admitted that 15% of end users were receiving a poor service through the NBN and were "seriously dissatisfied". In addition, Morrow indicated that, at July 2017, prices and performance for end users were suppressed through a "price war" between Retail Service Providers.

A 2017 report by the Joint Standing Committee on the National Broadband Network (NBN) found significant issues with the technology used by the NBN and the performance of NBN Co, all but one of the Coalition members of the committee released a dissenting report strongly defending the NBN and NBN Co.

In response to the imminent broadcast of a documentary critical of the performance of the NBN on Four Corners, Turnbull stated that the NBN was a failure, blaming the earlier Rudd and Gillard governments. The Four Corners documentary noted significant issues with the roll out and complaints regarding performance of the NBN. Following the Prime Minister's acknowledgment of the NBN's failure, Kevin Rudd noted that, on assuming government in 2013, Malcolm Turnbull, as Minister for Communications in the Abbott government radically changed the technical aspects of the NBN.

=== Rohingya crisis ===
In early September 2017, as the Rohingya crisis in Myanmar became ethnic cleansing, Foreign Minister Julie Bishop said that Australia was deeply concerned by the escalating violence in Myanmar's Rakhine State and would provide up to A$5 million to help Rohingya refugees in Bangladesh.

=== Reshuffle ===
In a December 2017 reshuffle of the Turnbull ministry, Christian Porter became Attorney-General. In early 2018 George Brandis was appointed as Australia's High Commissioner to the United Kingdom. Following the resignation of Deputy Prime Minister Barnaby Joyce from cabinet amid a philandering scandal, Turnbull reshuffled the ministry, as Michael McCormack took on Joyce's roles after being elected National Party leader that morning.

=== 2018 budget ===
The 2018 Australian federal budget was handed down on 8 May 2018.

=== August 2018 leadership spills ===
After the unfavourable results in the "Super Saturday" by-elections, and the backdown on the National Energy Guarantee policy, discontent within the Liberal Party came to a head. On 21 August 2018, facing a revolt by conservative MPs, Turnbull called a leadership spill. He was challenged for the Liberal Party leadership by Home Affairs Minister Peter Dutton, and won 48 votes to 35. Tensions in the party continued over the following days, leading to mass resignations of ministers. On 24 August, Dutton presented to Turnbull a petition calling for a party room meeting. A party meeting was then called, and the leadership was spilled by a vote of 45 to 40, with Turnbull choosing not to stand. Scott Morrison was elected as Turnbull's successor by 45 votes over Dutton with 40. Turnbull departed the prime ministership after a press conference in which he denounced Dutton and Abbott as "wreckers".

== See also ==
- First Turnbull Ministry
- Second Turnbull Ministry
- Shadow Cabinet of Malcolm Turnbull
