= Liberal Party of Australia leadership spill, 2015 =

Liberal Party of Australia leadership spill, 2015 may refer to:

- Liberal Party of Australia leadership spill motion, February 2015
- Liberal Party of Australia leadership spill, September 2015
