= 2015 Liberal Party of Australia leadership spill =

2015 Liberal Party of Australia leadership spill may refer to:

- February 2015 Liberal Party of Australia leadership spill motion
- September 2015 Liberal Party of Australia leadership spill
