= 2015 Australian federal budget =

Australian federal budget 2015–16
- Submitted: 12 May 2015
- Submitted by: Abbott government
- Submitted to: House of Representatives
- Country: Australia
- Parliament: 44th
- Party: Liberal/National Coalition
- Treasurer: Joe Hockey
- Program spending: $428.6 billion
- Deficit: $29.8 billion
- Debt: $296.4 billion (net debt) (18.0% of GDP)
- Website: archive.budget.gov.au/2015-16/index.htm

The 2015 Australian federal budget was the federal budget to fund government services and operations for the 2015/16 financial year. The 2015 budget was the second and last submitted by the Abbott government, since the Coalition's victory in the 2013 Australian federal election. Treasurer Joe Hockey presented the budget to the House of Representatives on 12 May 2015, it was his final budget before being replaced by Scott Morrison as Treasurer following the 2015 Liberal Party leadership spill.

The budget featured a $4.4 billion Families Package to reform child care in Australia and a $5.5 billion Jobs and Small Business Package to assist small business. The budget was passed by both the House of Representatives and the Senate and took effect at the start of the 2015–16 financial year, which began on 1 July 2015.

== Forecasts ==
=== Deficit ===
The budget is the eighth in a row to contain a deficit. In May 2015, the deficit for financial year 2015–16 was forecast to be $35.1 billion (2.1% of GDP). In December 2015, this increased to $37.4 billion.

== Revenues ==
The falling price of iron ore cut billions of dollars from forecast budget revenue. New laws were announced which sought to stop multinational corporations from using tax minimisation schemes.

== Expenditure ==
=== General government ===
The budget included funding for the 2016 Australian census as well as money for the updating of information technology at the Australian Bureau of Statistics.

Funding for a "Digital Transformation Agenda" was included in the budget. $254.7 million is to be spent on a small team who will work "across government to develop and coordinate the delivery of digital services". Money was also allocated in relation to the new data retention scheme to provide technical assistance to the telecommunications industry as well as for the Ombudsman to monitor the scheme.

=== Social security and welfare ===
Failed attempts to index the age pension to inflation in the previous budget have been scrapped. Instead the asset threshold for eligibility will be decreased to $820,000 for couples and to around $550,000 for single people. More than $327 million of new funding is being used to support child care for disadvantaged children. The budget contained a large savings measure through the pursuit of outstanding debts and the investigation of cases of fraud.

=== Community services and culture ===
Foreign aid saw further cuts following reductions in last year's budget. Aid to Africa was reduced by 70% and to Indonesia by 40%.

== Reception ==
This budget marked a significant change from last year's budget emergency and fiscal crisis towards restoring faith and building confidence with the electorate.

A number of economists described the economic growth forecasts as too optimistic, particularly the long-term rate of 3.5% as an over-estimate. Aid groups condemned cuts to foreign aid. A spokesperson from Oxfam said the cuts would impact security and Australia's international standing.

According to modelling conducted by the National Centre for Social and Economic Modelling low-income families could be face a 7% loss of their total disposable income by 2018–19 due to changes in this budget. Their research found that it will most likely benefit middle to high-income families which use childcare.

== See also ==
- Australian government debt
- Economy of Australia
