= September 2015 Liberal Party of Australia leadership spill =

Liberal Party of Australia Leadership spill, September 2015
- Leadership election
- 14 September 2015
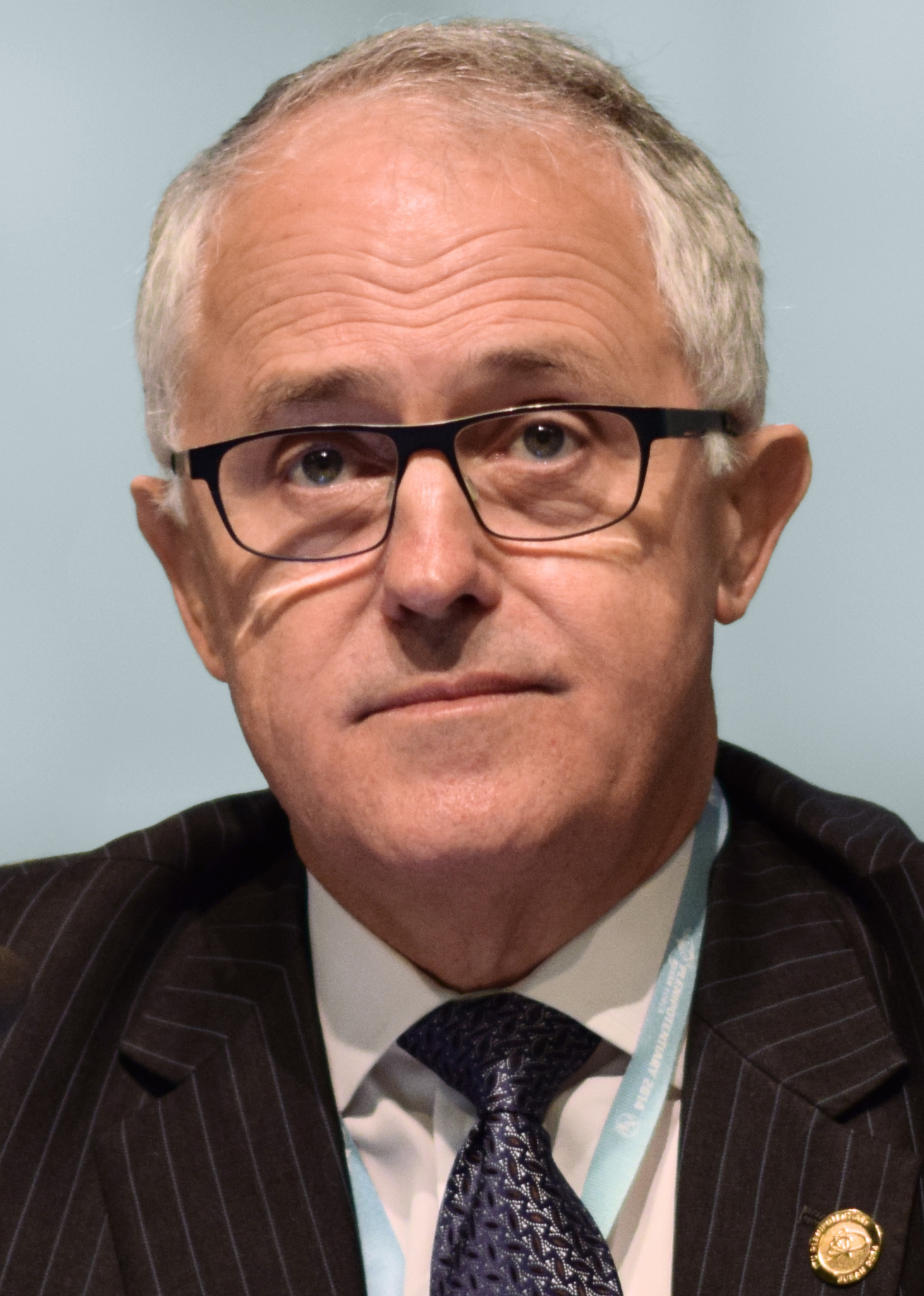

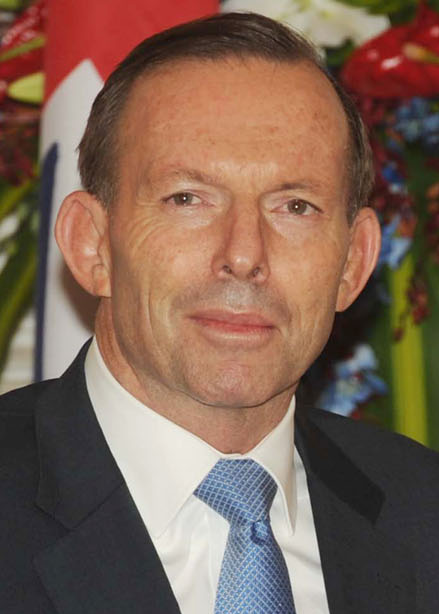
| Candidate | Malcolm Turnbull | Tony Abbott |
| Votes | 54 | 44 |
| % | 55.1% | 44.9% |
| Seat | Wentworth (NSW) | Warringah (NSW) |
| Faction | Moderate | Conservative |
Leader before election
Tony Abbott
Elected Leader
Malcolm Turnbull
- Deputy leadership election
- 14 September 2015
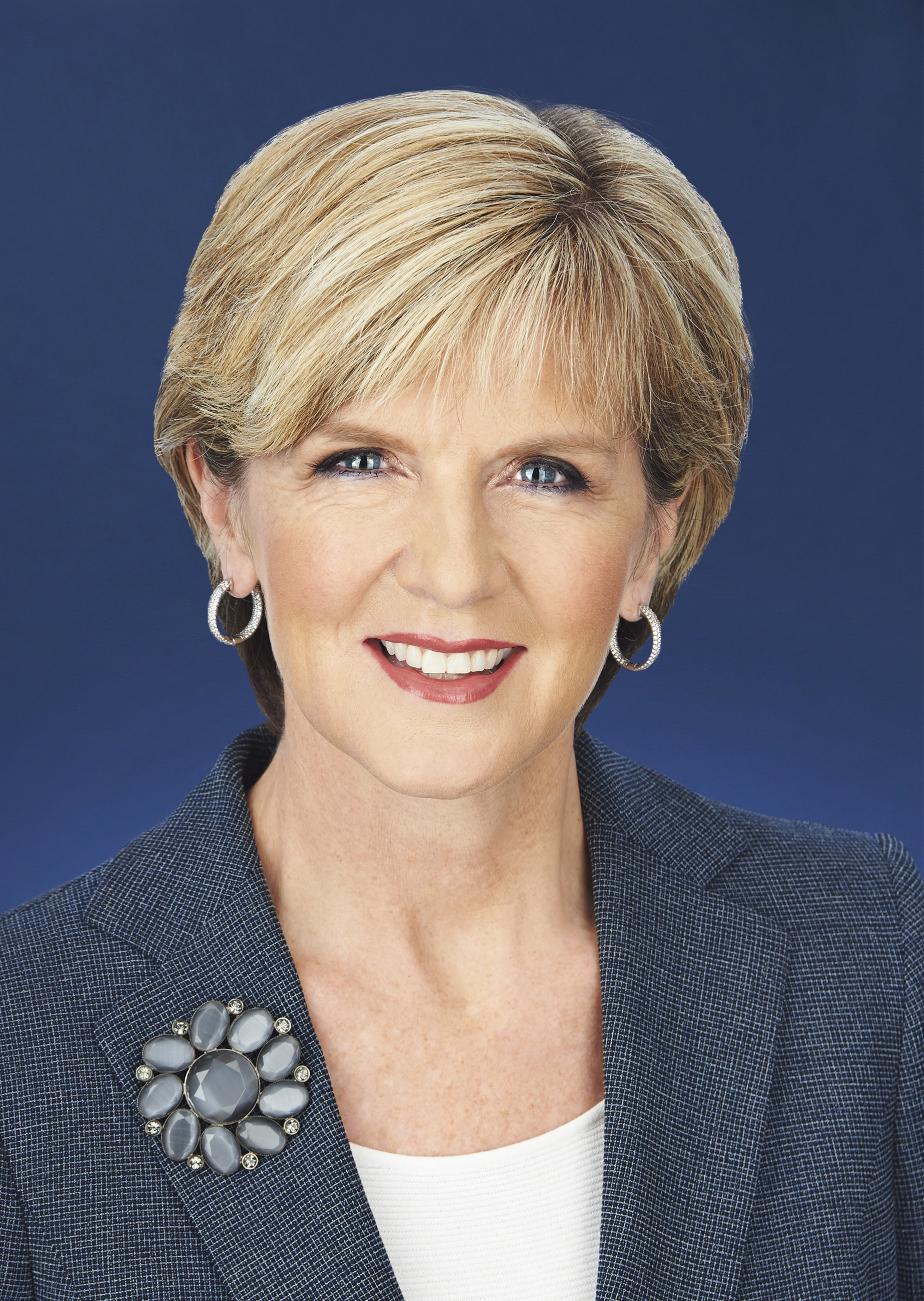

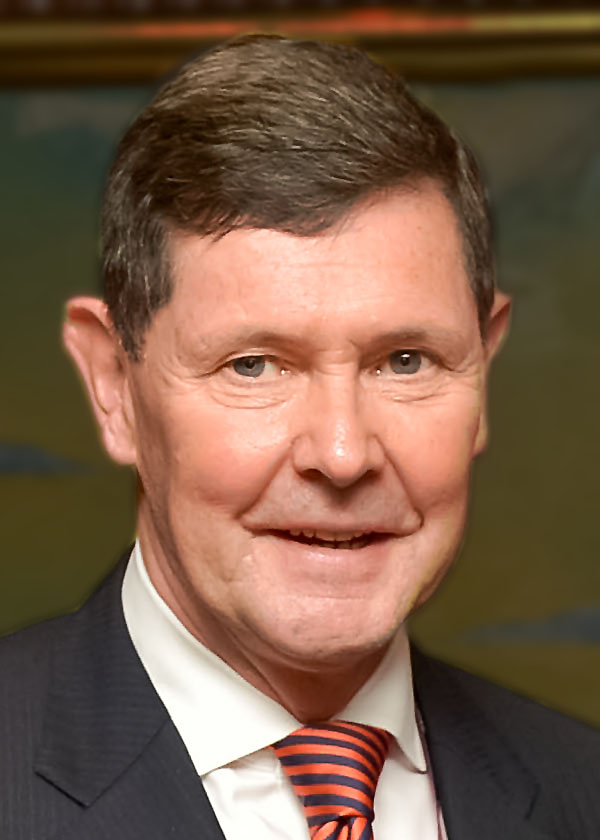
| Candidate | Julie Bishop | Kevin Andrews |
| Votes | 70 | 30 |
| % | 70.0% | 30.0% |
| Seat | Curtin (WA) | Menzies (Vic.) |
| Faction | Moderate | Conservative |
Deputy before election
Julie Bishop
Elected Deputy
Julie Bishop

A motion seeking a leadership spill of the federal parliamentary leader of the Liberal Party of Australia and Prime Minister was proposed by Malcolm Turnbull, who requested the ballot on 14 September 2015. The incumbent Prime Minister, Tony Abbott, announced that a meeting of Liberal members of the House and Senate would take place at 9:15 pm AEST on 14 September 2015 for the purpose of a spill motion. During the meeting a vote was held for the leadership and deputy leadership. Turnbull defeated Abbott, 54 votes to 44, becoming the leader of the Liberal Party of Australia and Prime Minister-nominee. Julie Bishop retained her position of deputy leader defeating Kevin Andrews 70 votes to 30.

With no contender, a February 2015 leadership spill motion had seen Abbott defeat a motion to spill the leadership 61 votes to 39.

== Background ==
Rumours of a leadership spill had continuously followed the Liberal Party for two years due to their poor performance in polls across all major news companies, with a motion for a spill being requested but ultimately defeated in February 2015. Following the February spill vote, Abbott delivered a speech to the members calling for their support and promised to consult more with backbench MPs. In this speech, as a follow-up to the poorly-received 2014 budget, Abbott made a new commitment to further cut tax rates for small businesses, promised that the 2015 budget would leave families better off and agreed to reduce the role his chief of staff Peta Credlin played in the government. After the Liberal Party meeting concluded, Abbott made a televised statement in which he said that "The Liberal Party has dealt with the spill motion and now this matter is behind us". Michelle Grattan, writing in The Conversation, argued that the "narrow margin" of the vote left Abbott "deeply vulnerable to later destabilisation". News Corp Australia journalist Malcolm Farr wrote that Abbott had been "given, at best, a stay of execution". In May, information was leaked about citizenship changes. In August, daily talking points for ministers were leaked to Fairfax Media, which included that 'cabinet was functioning well'.

Abbott was perceived as extremely gaffe-prone. Just days before losing the premiership, he was captured on footage laughing out loud in response to a joke made by minister Peter Dutton about rising sea levels in Pacific island nations. Both were immediately drawn to the attention of the microphone and cringed, and when later pressed by the media with the footage shown, both refused to confirm or deny what was said.

Also of concern was the loss of their state government counterparts at the 2014 Victorian election and particularly the 2015 Queensland election. In South Australia, the rival Labor government went from minority to majority government after a surprise win at the 2014 Fisher by-election, several months after the Liberal opposition's fourth consecutive loss following the 2014 South Australian election. In addition, multiple polls predicted a double-digit two-party swing at the 2015 Canning by-election against the Abbott government, which may have sparked a realisation in the Abbott government that a lack of voter support was becoming entrenched. Under Turnbull the Liberal candidate retained the seat for his party despite having to rely on preferences after suffering a primary and two-party swing.

Abbott's proposal to take marriage equality to a non-binding plebiscite in 2017 may have encouraged conservative Liberals to support Turnbull in the spill on the understanding that Turnbull would honour that commitment.

On Friday 11 September, Simon Benson published a leak from a "senior source" that a Cabinet reshuffle would dump up to six ministers. Turnbull said that the leak was a "[Peta] Credlin special" and rallied supporters to support a leadership challenge. That day, Deputy Government Whip Andrew Nikolic sent Turnbull a letter on Abbott's behalf asking Turnbull to publicly rule out a leadership challenge. Turnbull refused on the grounds that this would only fuel speculation.

A meeting in regard to the leadership was held on Sunday 13 September at the home of Dr Peter Hendy, attended by Malcolm Turnbull, Wyatt Roy, Arthur Sinodinos, Mitch Fifield, Mal Brough, James McGrath and Scott Ryan, and Julie Bishop's chief of staff, Murray Hansen.

However, on Monday 14 September, anonymous sources confirmed in the early morning to news companies that Turnbull, then Minister for Communications, was planning to try and oust Tony Abbott. Abbott brushed off rumours of a leadership spill in the morning, but was unable to secure the verbal support of both Turnbull and Bishop. At around midday, Bishop had a conversation with Tony Abbott where she told him that he had "lost the backing of the majority of the party room and the majority of the cabinet". The Sydney Morning Herald reports that Abbott offered the job of deputy to Scott Morrison, who turned it down due to the leaks that Joe Hockey would be dumped as Treasurer. Andrews, who had previously been the target of a leak, was a conservative candidate for deputy.

At 4 pm AEST, Turnbull held a press conference where he announced that he would be launching a challenge to Abbott's leadership, believing that the Prime Minister had "not been capable of providing the economic leadership" that Australia and business needed. Turnbull stated that a "style of leadership that respects the people's intelligence" was needed. He also cited that Prime Minister Abbott had lost 30 consecutive Newspolls for preferred Prime Minister, a statement he later regretted because it became a test for his own popularity as Prime Minister. Shorten held a news conference later and stated that a change of leader of the Liberal party would not change the policies. After formally launching his challenge, Abbott held a press conference two hours later at 6:15 pm AEST to confirm that a leadership vote would be happening that evening.

Abbott is the shortest-serving Australian Prime Minister since William McMahon and aside from Kevin Rudd's second incarnation which lasted for three months in 2013.

== Endorsements prior to vote by Liberal MPs ==
Prior to the vote some MPs had publicly announced whom they intended to vote for.

=== Tony Abbott ===
At 6:30 pm AEST, Joe Hockey addressed the press, describing Turnbull's claims as unfounded, listing the Government's economic achievements and expressing his loyalty to the Prime Minister.

At around 6:50 pm AEST, Peter Dutton and Mathias Cormann confirmed on Sky News that they would be supporting Abbott in the spill motion.

Liberal members, Craig Kelly and Ian Goodenough announced on Twitter their support for Abbott.

Kevin Andrews, Eric Abetz, Cory Bernardi, Josh Frydenberg, Andrew Nikolic and Scott Morrison announced during the lead up to the vote that they supported Tony Abbott.

=== Malcolm Turnbull ===
Early in the day Bishop as Deputy Leader informed Abbott that he did not have her confidence and she would support Turnbull.

Wyatt Roy stated to a 2GB radio host that he would be supporting Turnbull.

Arthur Sinodinos announced that he would support Turnbull in the spill motion.

Christopher Pyne, George Brandis, Mitch Fifield, Marise Payne and Simon Birmingham announced throughout the night that they would support Turnbull.

== Vote ==
At around 8:35 pm AEST, chief government whip Scott Buchholz announced on Twitter that the party meeting would commence at 9:15 pm.

Turnbull won the spill motion with 54 votes to Abbott's 44. There were a total of 99 Liberal MPs and senators who participated in the vote; one member voted informally.

Bishop won the position of Deputy Leader with 70 votes, to Andrews' 30 votes. 100 members participated in the vote for Deputy Leader, the member who voted informally in the spill for leader voted formally and Senator Michael Ronaldson arrived in time for the vote. With Turnbull's second incarnation as leader, Bishop, who had been deputy leader since 2007, retained this position for a fourth leadership cycle.

Turnbull's victory occurred two days shy of the seventh anniversary since his first election as leader on 16 September 2008 when he defeated Brendan Nelson. The change of Prime Minister also means that Australia had five Prime Ministers in six years. Turnbull became the first former Opposition Leader (in contrast to a sitting one) to become Prime Minister, with the notable exceptions of John Howard and Robert Menzies (who had both had a hiatus between a previous period as opposition leader and a current period, when each became Prime Minister - in Menzies case for the second time).

== Aftermath ==
=== Malcolm Turnbull ===
At 10:40 pm AEST Turnbull and Bishop addressed the press and acknowledged the debt the party owed to Tony Abbott and the Abbott government's achievements. Turnbull said he would not go to an early election to seek a mandate from the people and that his government would maintain the climate change targets that the Abbott government committed to.

According to Turnbull, several weeks after the spill, he reached out to Abbott to see how he was faring. Abbott was reportedly furious at the call, and swore at Turnbull multiple times. Turnbull further claims that Abbott threatened "that if I didn't do as he asked, he would be very f***ing difficult."

On 21 August 2018, facing a revolt by conservative MPs, Turnbull called a leadership spill. He was challenged by Peter Dutton but narrowly survived. After continued unrest, Turnbull called another spill on 24 August and chose not to stand, resulting in Scott Morrison defeating Dutton to become Turnbull's successor as Prime Minister.

=== Julie Bishop ===
In addition to addressing the press on the evening of 14 September, Bishop was interviewed by Channel 9 on the morning of 15 September. On the morning of 15 September, Bishop stated that Abbott had asked for six months to turn things around and that seven months later, the majority of the party room felt that had not occurred.

Bishop continued as Foreign Minister in the Turnbull government until August 2018 when she resigned following a failed leadership bid.

=== John Howard ===
Former Liberal Prime Minister John Howard addressed the media at 1:45 pm AEST on 15 September. Howard praised the Abbott government's achievements and affirmed that he would support Turnbull in government. He stated that the Australian people would decide if the Liberal Party had made the right choice. Howard, when asked, refused to say where Abbott went wrong, but did state he believed the consistent bad polls, not the media, were ultimately responsible for the spill.

=== Tony Abbott ===
Abbott addressed the media at 12:40 pm on 15 September. Abbott stated that he had never leaked or undermined anyone, and he would not start now. He stated that being Prime Minister is not an end in itself, it was about serving. He asserted that the nature of politics had changed in the last decade, with a "febrile media culture" rewarding "treachery". Abbott exhorted the media to refuse to parlay with people who won't put their names to their comments.

Abbott's final speech as Prime Minister on 15 September did not address his political future. However, he announced the next day that he would remain in Parliament. Despite his promise of "no sniping" in his final speech as Prime Minister, media outlets reported ongoing sniping from the Abbott camp in the following months, particularly around Islamic issues. In early December 2015, Abbott said he would not make a decision on his political future until April 2016.

Subsequent national polling indicated widespread support for the removal of Abbott as Prime Minister and Liberal leader. A ReachTel poll of 743 residents in Abbott's safe Liberal seat of Warringah, conducted by phone on the evening of 17 December 2015, indicated his electorate wanted him to retire from parliament at the next election. The Australia Institute executive director, Ben Oquist, who commissioned the independent polling, claimed: "The polling indicates that the electorate is quickly moving on from the Tony Abbott era". Abbott recontested his electoral seat of Warringah at the 2016 federal election, and won with 52% of the primary vote.

After Abbott's re-election at the 2016 federal election he was critical of policy positions of his party on a number of occasions.

Abbott lost his seat to independent Zali Steggall in the 2019 election.

=== International reactions ===
- Fiji: Prime Minister Frank Bainimarama congratulated Turnbull for winning the spill.

== Liberal Party voting rules ==
Under Liberal Party rules, any Liberal member of parliament or senator can propose a motion to spill the party's leadership. The leader of the party then invites a discussion of the motion at a party room meeting and makes a decision whether to call a vote on the matter based on the sentiments which are expressed. The leader chooses whether to conduct the vote through a public show of hands or a secret ballot; historically it has been conducted by secret ballot.

If a vote on the spill motion is conducted and a majority supports a spill, the leadership is declared to be vacant. Candidates then nominate for the position and a vote is held among the members present at the meeting. If more than two people nominate and no candidate wins a majority, further rounds of voting take place, with the lowest-placed candidate being eliminated until a candidate wins a majority of the vote in a ballot and is therefore the winner.

== See also ==
- February 2015 Liberal Party of Australia leadership spill motion
- Turnbull government
- Abbott government
