= February 2015 Liberal Party of Australia leadership spill motion =

Political party leadership contest

February 2015 Liberal Party of Australia Leadership spill motion
- 9 February 2015
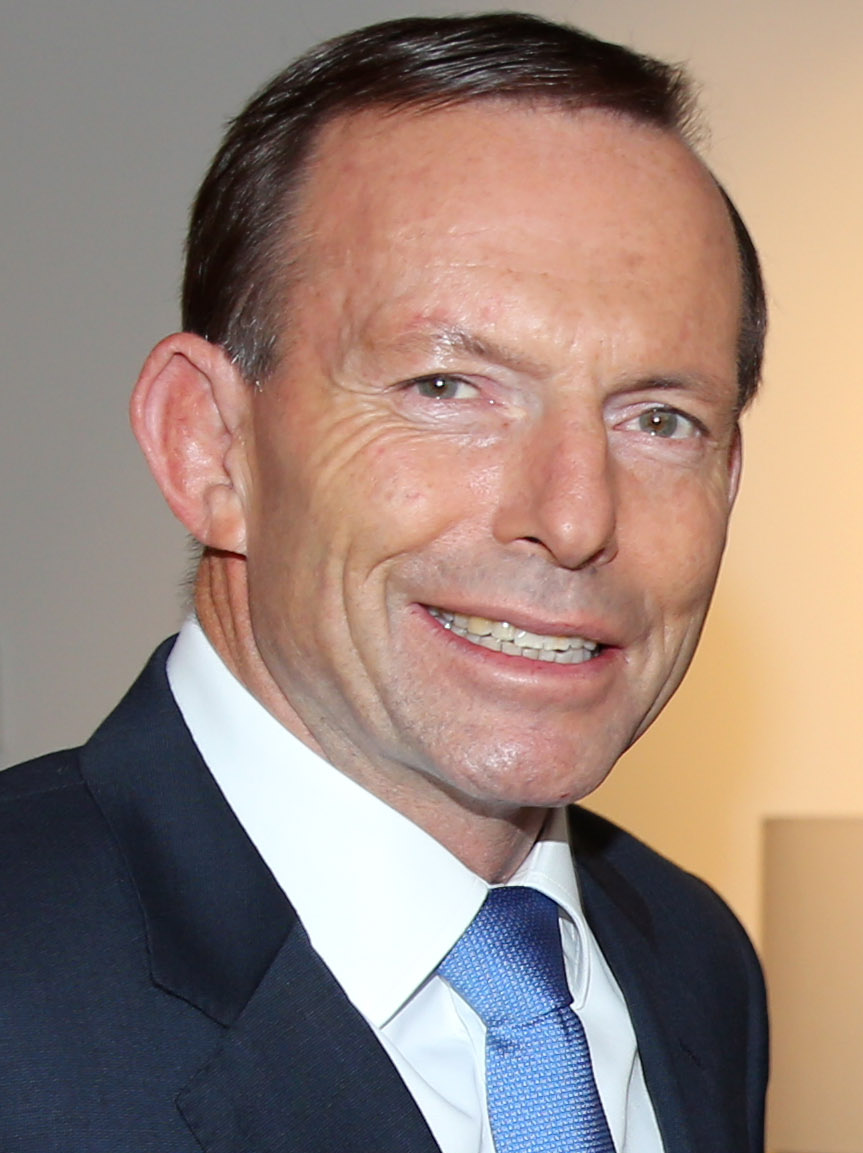

Candidate	Tony Abbott	Spill motion
Caucus vote	61	39
Percentage	61.0%	39.0%
Seat	Warringah (NSW)
Faction	Conservative
Leader before election
Tony Abbott
Elected Leader
Tony Abbott

A leadership spill for the federal parliamentary leader of the Liberal Party of Australia, and therein Prime Minister and Deputy Leader was held on 9 February 2015. It became known as the Empty Chair Spill. Luke Simpkins and Don Randall moved the spill motion at the meeting. Incumbent Prime Minister Tony Abbott and deputy leader of the Liberal Party Julie Bishop jointly stood in opposition to the motion which was defeated by 61 votes to 39.

A September 2015 leadership spill would see Malcolm Turnbull defeat Abbott 54 votes to 44.

== Background ==
Tony Abbott became leader of the Liberal Party in December 2009 after forcing a leadership ballot on the subject of Malcolm Turnbull's support of the Labor First Rudd government's proposed Emissions Trading Scheme. Joe Hockey was initially thought by political commentators as the favourite to win the ballot. However, Hockey was defeated in the first round of voting, and in the second and final round, Abbott defeated Turnbull by 42 votes to 41 to become the party's leader and Leader of the Opposition. Bishop was re-elected as Deputy Leader, and declared subsequent to the ballot in a 2013 interview that she supported Turnbull. Abbott led the Liberal/National Coalition to the 2010 federal election where a hung parliament was the outcome. After a protracted period of negotiations, Prime Minister Julia Gillard formed the Second Gillard government. Following the 2010 election, Abbott and Bishop were re-elected unopposed as leaders of the Liberal Party.

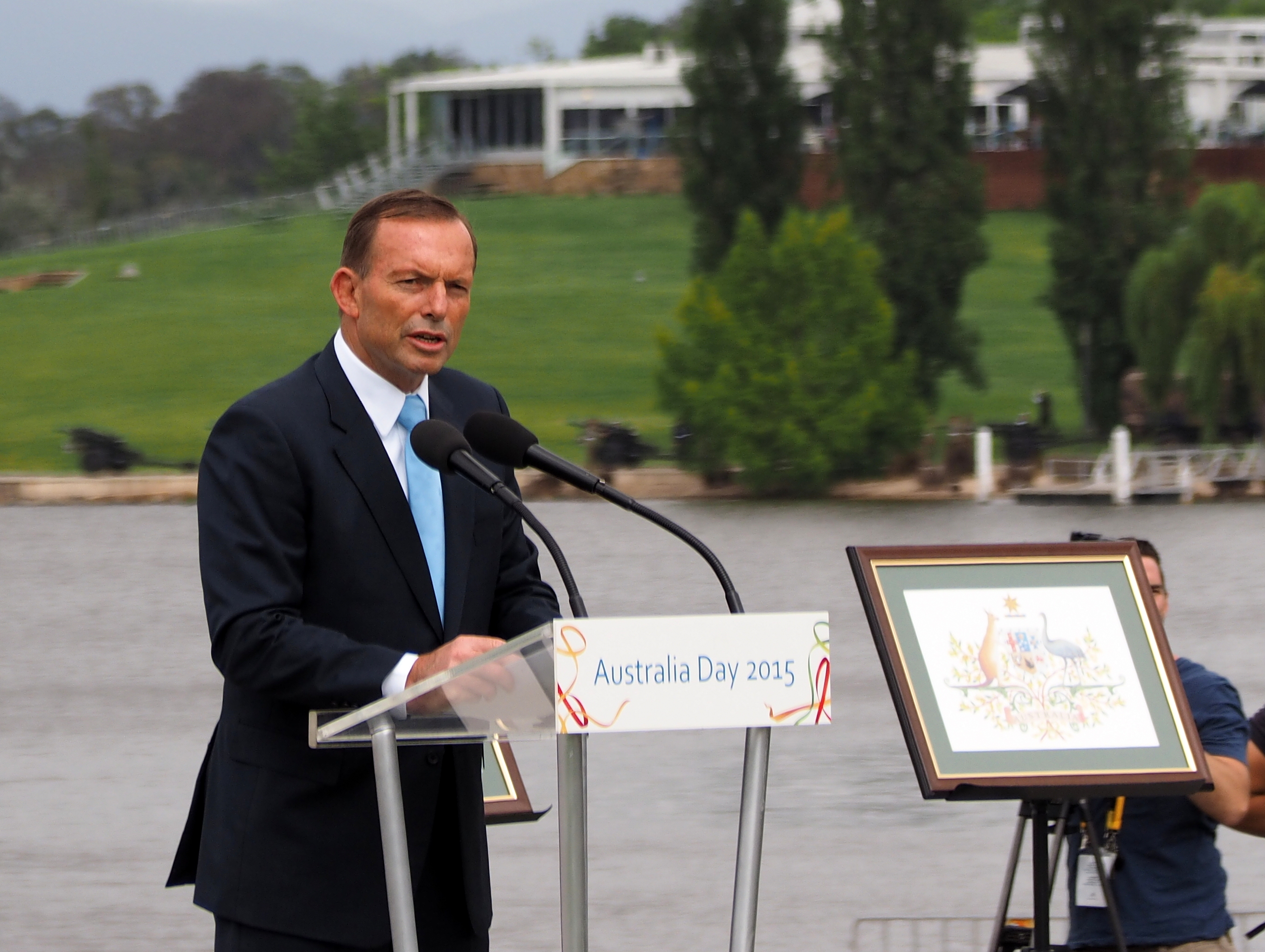
Prime Minister Abbott on Australia Day 2015, the day it was announced that Prince Philip and Air Chief Marshal Angus Houston were appointed Knights of the Order of Australia.

At the 2013 federal election, Abbott led the Coalition to victory over the incumbent second Rudd government. Abbott and his ministry were sworn in on 18 September 2013. Abbott government came to power with 53.5 percent of the two-party preferred vote. However, the Coalition failed to win control of the Senate, that resulted in several blockages of the Coalition's proposed legislative reforms including university education and TAFE deregulation, co-payment for general practitioner visits, and a paid parental leave scheme. By the May release of the 2014 budget, average polling revealed that the Abbott government's two-party preferred vote had decreased to 46 percent; and despite an upward swing in polling between August and October 2014, by late January and early February 2015, polling had reduced the two-party preferred vote to 45 percent. A Fairfax/Ipsos poll in released in early February revealed that Abbott's approval rating had fallen 9 points to 29 per cent since December and his disapproval had risen 10 points to 67 per cent. Abbott trailed Labor Opposition leader Bill Shorten as preferred Prime Minister by 50 per cent to 34 per cent, an 8 point worsening for Abbott since December.

On Australia Day 2015 Abbott announced that Queen Elizabeth had accepted his recommendation that her husband, Prince Philip, Duke of Edinburgh, be appointed a Knight of the Order of Australia. The appointment was criticised by Shorten who said: "It's a time warp where we're giving knighthoods to English royalty. Some people (have) wondered whether it was an Australia Day hoax." Adam Giles, Northern Territory chief minister and Country Liberal Party leader, said: "I woke up this morning and read the wires and was confused between Australia Day and April Fool's Day," adding "It makes us a bit of a joke. It's Australia Day, we're not a bunch of tossers." Abbott later stated that he had made a captain's call and not consulted with his cabinet colleagues over the appointment. Abbott faced criticism from some parliamentarians in his own party and the Nationals over the proposed appointment.

Meanwhile, the 2015 Queensland election was held on 31 January with Abbott asked to stay away from Queensland during the campaign period. Premier Newman, who lost his seat at the election, claimed that the decision to award a knighthood to Prince Philip caused an unwanted distraction in the final days of the campaign as Newman sought to focus on jobs and the economy. The sitting Liberal National Party suffered a 14 point two-party swing, and lost what was considered an unlosable election (owing to its overwhelming majority) to Labor, which subsequently formed minority government.

Dissent initially emerged from backbenchers, including Andrew Laming from Queensland, and Western Australia's Dennis Jensen, who was the first Liberal MP to publicly call on the prime minister to resign. Their dissent was echoed by several other Liberal backbenchers, including Simpkins and Randall from Western Australia. On Friday, 6 February, Simpkins submitted to the Chief Government Whip a motion, seconded by Randall, to spill the parliamentary leadership positions of the Liberal Party.

On the day before the leadership spill vote, Abbott announced that a planned submarine deal, which previously seemed likely to be manufactured by Japanese shipbuilders, would instead proceed with an "open tender". This announcement came as a surprise as the Government had resisted calls for an open tender months prior to the spill motion, and was seen as an attempt by Abbott to secure support from South Australian parliamentarians, such as Senator Sean Edwards who warned he may not support Abbott in the motion over the issue. ASC Pty Ltd, the Government owned naval shipbuilding corporation is based in Adelaide, South Australia. After, the government chose to call it a "competitive evaluation process" rather than an "open tender" with no indication of what would change.

Various media sources have reported that a National Civic Council NCC email campaign helped in part to secure Tony Abbott's position as Prime Minister before the spill motion in February 2015. Senator Eric Abetz stated before the spill: "In the last few days the emails have been overwhelmingly flooding the office saying all this nonsense about leadership has gone far too far, and the emails are now overwhelmingly saying 'stick to the team you've got'"

== Liberal Party voting rules ==
Under party rules, any Liberal MP or senator can propose a motion to spill the party's leadership. The leader of the party then invites a discussion of the motion at a party room meeting, and makes a decision whether to call a vote on the matter based on the sentiments which are expressed. The leader can also choose to conduct this vote through a public show of hands or a secret ballot. Abbott stated, before the ballot, that it would be conducted in secret, as has previously occurred. By convention, Liberal Party ministers are expected to vote against conducting leadership spills.

If a vote on the spill motion is conducted, and a majority supports a spill, the leadership is declared to be vacant. Candidates then nominate for the position, and a vote is held among the members present at the meeting. If more than two people nominate, multiple rounds of voting take place if no candidate has a majority, with the lowest-placed candidate being eliminated until a candidate has a majority of the votes of a ballot. There were 102 Liberal members at this spill, and 52 would need to be in favour for the motion to succeed if all were in attendance at the party room meeting.

== Vote ==
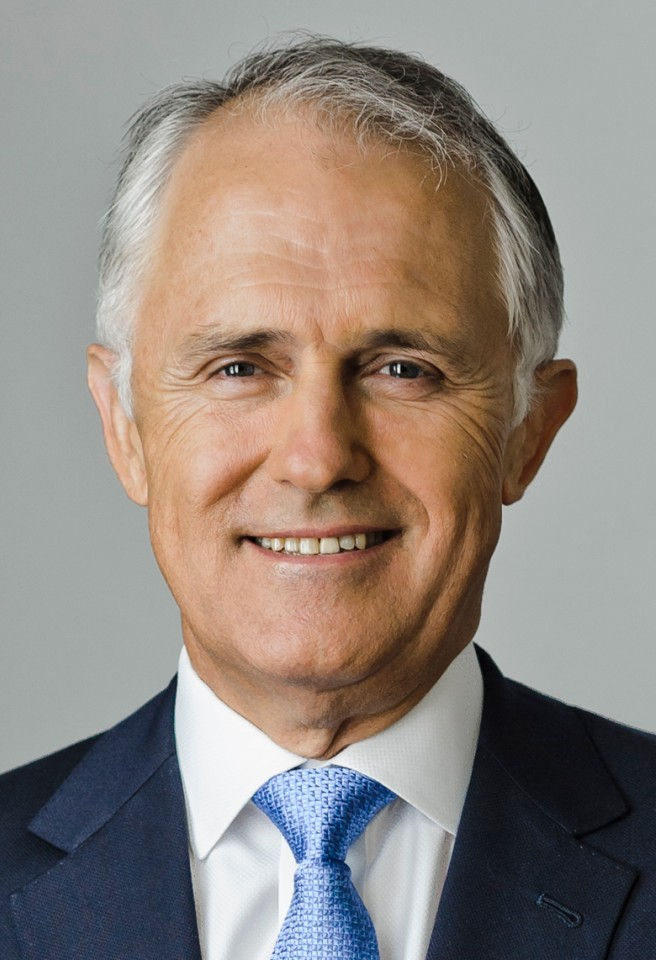
Malcolm Turnbull would become Prime Minister of Australia after defeating Abbott at the September 2015 Liberal leadership ballot.

On the morning of 9 February, The Australian reported that a Newspoll survey conducted over the previous days had found that Abbott was the most unpopular Prime Minister since Paul Keating in 1994. The survey also found that Bishop or Turnbull would be preferred to Abbott as the Prime Minister. The Australian Financial Review stated that the results of this and other recent polling were "disastrous" for the government, and that "Voters have adopted an 'anyone but Abbott' view of the Liberal leadership".

A motion to spill the leadership was voted on, and defeated, in the Liberal Party meeting which commenced at 9am on 9 February. All of the Liberal MPs and senators other than Ross Vasta attended the meeting; Vasta was on paternity leave. A total of 61 members voted against the motion, 39 supported it and one cast an informal vote. Following the vote Abbott delivered a speech to the members calling for their support, and promised to consult more with backbench MPs. In this speech, Abbott also made a new commitment to further cut tax rates for small businesses, promised that the 2015 budget would leave families better off and agreed to reduce the role his chief of staff Peta Credlin plays in the government. After the Liberal Party meeting concluded, Abbott made a televised statement in which he said that "The Liberal Party has dealt with the spill motion and now this matter is behind us".

Michelle Grattan, writing in The Conversation, argued that the "narrow margin" of the vote left Abbott "deeply vulnerable to later destabilisation". News Limited journalist Malcolm Farr wrote that Abbott had been "given, at best, a stay of execution".

On 13 February, Abbott removed Father of the Parliament Philip Ruddock from his position as Chief Government Whip in the House of Representatives and replaced him with Scott Buchholz. Some Liberal MPs and journalists attributed Ruddock's removal to Abbott being dissatisfied with Ruddock's performance in managing the tensions leading to the spill motion. However, Bishop and some other MPs rejected any link. Abbott stated that he had made the change as part of reforms to provide "a deeper and stronger engagement with the backbench", and it was not retribution against Ruddock.

== See also ==
- September 2015 Liberal Party of Australia leadership spill
- Abbott government
