= Results of the 2022 Australian federal election =

Results of the 2022 Australian federal election may refer to:

- Results of the 2022 Australian federal election (House of Representatives)
  - Results of the 2022 Australian federal election in New South Wales
  - Results of the 2022 Australian federal election in Queensland
  - Results of the 2022 Australian federal election in South Australia
  - Results of the 2022 Australian federal election in Tasmania
  - Results of the 2022 Australian federal election in territories
  - Results of the 2022 Australian federal election in Victoria
  - Results of the 2022 Australian federal election in Western Australia
- Results of the 2022 Australian federal election (Senate)
