= Results of the 2019 Australian federal election in Western Australia =

2019 Australian federal election (Western Australia)
← 2016	18 May 2019	2022 →

All 16 Western Australian seats in the Australian House of Representatives and 6 seats in the Australian Senate
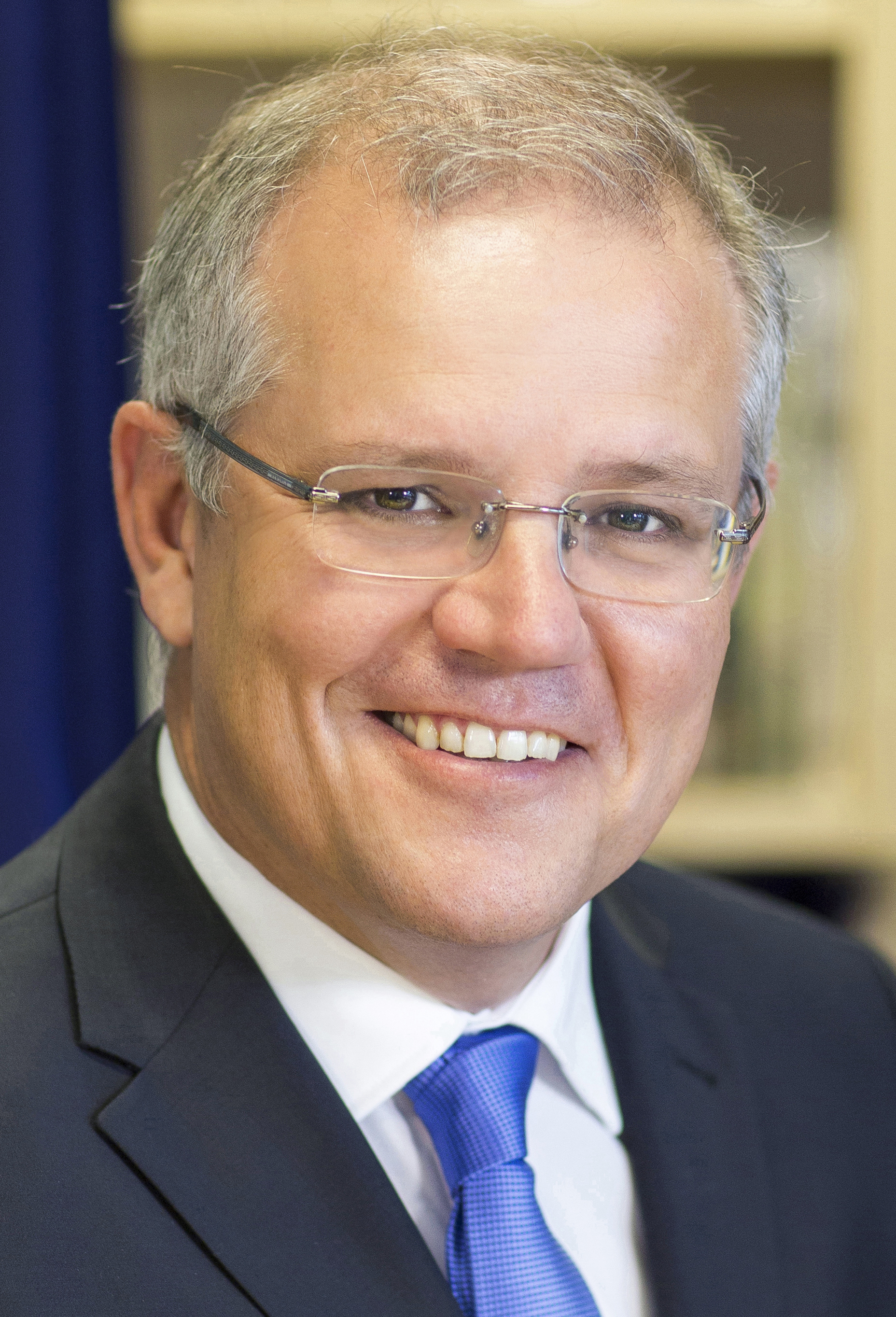

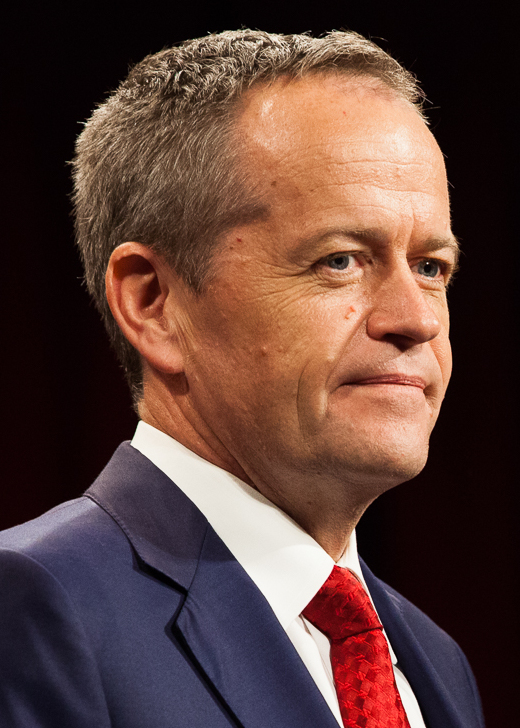
	First party	Second party
Leader	Scott Morrison	Bill Shorten
Party	Liberal/National coalition	Labor
Last election	11 seats	5 seats
Seats won	11 seats	5 seats
Seat change	Steady	Steady
Popular vote	633,930	417,727
Percentage	45.22%	29.80%
Swing	▼3.48	▼2.65
TPP	55.55%	44.45%
TPP swing	▲0.89	▼0.89

This is a list of electoral division results for the 2019 Australian federal election in the state of Western Australia.

This election was held using instant runoff voting. There were two "turn-overs" at this election. Labor won the seats of Cowan and Perth despite the Liberals finishing first.

== Overall results ==
Party	Votes	%	Swing	Seats	Change
Liberal/National Coalition
Liberal Party of Australia	613,915	43.79	−1.91	11	Steady
National Party of Australia	20,015	1.43	−1.57	0	Steady
Coalition total	633,930	45.22	-3.48	11	Steady
Australian Labor Party	417,727	29.80	−2.65	5	Steady
Australian Greens	162,876	11.62	−0.44		
Pauline Hanson's One Nation	74,478	5.31	+5.31		
United Australia Party	28,488	2.03	+2.03		
Western Australia Party	25,298	1.80	+1.80		
Australian Christians	23,802	1.70	−0.86		
Shooters, Fishers and Farmers Party	10,966	0.78	+0.33		
Fraser Anning's Conservative National Party	3,575	0.26	+0.26		
Science Party	1,329	0.09	+0.09		
Animal Justice Party	1,304	0.09	+0.09		
Socialist Alliance	990	0.07	−0.03		
The Great Australian Party	883	0.06	+0.06		
VOTEFLUX	602	0.04	+0.04		
Australia First Party	251	0.02	+0.02		
Independent	15,375	1.10	−0.20		
Total	1,401,874			16	
Two-party-preferred vote
Liberal/National Coalition	778,781	55.55	+0.89	11	Steady
Labor	623,093	44.45	−0.89	5	Steady
Invalid/blank votes	80,575	5.44	+1.45		
Registered voters/turnout	1,646,262	90.05	+1.67		
Source: AEC Tally Room

== Results by division ==
=== Brand ===
2019 Australian federal election: Brand
Party	Candidate	Votes	%	±%
Labor	Madeleine King	35,875	40.38	−7.10
Liberal	Jack Pleiter	26,510	29.84	−1.78
Greens	Jody Freeman	9,863	11.10	−0.58
One Nation	Travis Carter	7,524	8.47	+8.47
Christians	Janine Vander Ven	2,726	3.07	−0.39
United Australia	Trevor Jones	2,570	2.89	+2.89
Western Australia	Blake Phelan	2,397	2.70	+2.70
Conservative National	Karen-Lee Mills	1,376	1.55	+1.55
Total formal votes		88,841	93.74	−2.04
Informal votes		5,928	6.26	+2.04
Turnout		94,769	88.57	+1.53
Two-party-preferred result
Labor	Madeleine King	50,333	56.66	−4.77
Liberal	Jack Pleiter	38,508	43.34	+4.77
Labor hold		Swing	−4.77	

=== Burt ===
2019 Australian federal election: Burt
Party	Candidate	Votes	%	±%
Labor	Matt Keogh	36,058	40.96	−6.07
Liberal	David Goode	29,420	33.42	−1.95
Greens	Simone Collins	8,285	9.41	+1.38
One Nation	Nicole Devincentis	5,116	5.81	+5.81
Christians	Warnar Spyker	3,298	3.75	−1.40
Shooters, Fishers, Farmers	Peter Raffaelli	1,942	2.21	−2.22
United Australia	Sahil Chawla	1,871	2.13	+2.13
Independent	Naomi Nation	1,149	1.31	+1.31
Western Australia	Sarcha Sagisaka	901	1.02	+1.02
Total formal votes		88,040	93.58	−2.00
Informal votes		6,042	6.42	+2.00
Turnout		94,082	89.42	+0.69
Two-party-preferred result
Labor	Matt Keogh	48,414	54.99	−2.12
Liberal	David Goode	39,626	45.01	+2.12
Labor hold		Swing	−2.12	

=== Canning ===
2019 Australian federal election: Canning
Party	Candidate	Votes	%	±%
Liberal	Andrew Hastie	44,580	49.05	−1.25
Labor	Mellisa Teede	24,996	27.50	−5.54
Greens	Jodie Moffat	6,840	7.53	−1.21
One Nation	Jackson Wreford	6,503	7.15	+7.15
Western Australia	Brett Clarke	2,554	2.81	+2.81
United Australia	Steve Veevers	2,055	2.26	+2.26
Christians	Jamie Van Burgel	1,764	1.94	−1.74
Conservative National	Malcolm Heffernan	1,600	1.76	+1.76
Total formal votes		90,892	93.91	−1.85
Informal votes		5,890	6.09	+1.85
Turnout		96,782	90.30	+1.08
Two-party-preferred result
Liberal	Andrew Hastie	55,947	61.55	+4.76
Labor	Mellisa Teede	34,945	38.45	−4.76
Liberal hold		Swing	+4.76	

=== Cowan ===
2019 Australian federal election: Cowan
Party	Candidate	Votes	%	±%
Liberal	Isaac Stewart	33,438	39.41	−2.81
Labor	Anne Aly	32,353	38.13	−3.55
Greens	Mark Cooper	8,551	10.08	+2.48
One Nation	Sheila Mundy	4,777	5.63	+5.63
United Australia	Peter Westcott	2,171	2.56	+2.56
Christians	Andre Lebrasse	1,981	2.33	−0.96
Shooters, Fishers, Farmers	Paul Bedford	1,582	1.86	−0.95
Total formal votes		84,853	94.59	+0.06
Informal votes		4,850	5.41	−0.06
Turnout		89,703	90.91	+1.31
Two-party-preferred result
Labor	Anne Aly	43,135	50.83	+0.15
Liberal	Isaac Stewart	41,718	49.17	−0.15
Labor hold		Swing	+0.15	

=== Curtin ===
2019 Australian federal election: Curtin
Party	Candidate	Votes	%	±%
Liberal	Celia Hammond	48,256	54.18	−11.32
Labor	Rob Meecham	15,692	17.62	+1.91
Greens	Cameron Pidgeon	13,847	15.55	+1.35
Independent	Louise Stewart	6,902	7.75	+7.75
Western Australia	Andrew Mangano	1,343	1.51	+1.51
United Australia	Joan Lever	1,114	1.25	+1.25
One Nation	Bill Edgar	1,054	1.18	+1.18
Christians	Deonne Kingsford	854	0.96	+0.96
Total formal votes		89,062	96.82	−1.16
Informal votes		2,927	3.18	+1.16
Turnout		91,989	91.65	+1.90
Two-party-preferred result
Liberal	Celia Hammond	57,296	64.33	−6.37
Labor	Rob Meecham	31,766	35.67	+6.37
Liberal hold		Swing	−6.37	

=== Durack ===
2019 Australian federal election: Durack
Party	Candidate	Votes	%	±%
Liberal	Melissa Price	34,429	44.30	+2.56
Labor	Sharyn Morrow	16,742	21.54	−4.36
National	Scott Bourne	7,878	10.14	−5.84
One Nation	Grahame Gould	7,407	9.53	+9.53
Greens	Johani Mamid	6,287	8.09	−1.96
Western Australia	Gary Mounsey	2,895	3.72	+3.72
United Australia	Brenden Hatton	2,083	2.68	+2.68
Total formal votes		77,721	95.23	−0.86
Informal votes		3,892	4.77	+0.86
Turnout		81,613	84.08	+2.05
Two-party-preferred result
Liberal	Melissa Price	50,332	64.76	+3.70
Labor	Sharyn Morrow	27,389	35.24	−3.70
Liberal hold		Swing	+3.70	

=== Forrest ===
2019 Australian federal election: Forrest
Party	Candidate	Votes	%	±%
Liberal	Nola Marino	47,470	52.48	+3.04
Labor	Wayne Sanford	19,126	21.14	−2.00
Greens	Nerilee Boshammer	11,645	12.87	+0.90
One Nation	Kalven Jamieson	5,371	5.94	+5.94
Shooters, Fishers, Farmers	Mark McCall	2,881	3.18	+3.18
United Australia	Dale Bromley	1,564	1.73	+1.73
Independent	Alexander Marsden	1,238	1.37	+1.37
Western Australia	Ian Molyneux	1,167	1.29	+1.29
Total formal votes		90,462	94.35	+0.21
Informal votes		5,418	5.65	−0.21
Turnout		95,880	90.95	+1.23
Two-party-preferred result
Liberal	Nola Marino	58,405	64.56	+2.00
Labor	Wayne Sanford	32,057	35.44	−2.00
Liberal hold		Swing	+2.00	

=== Fremantle ===
2019 Australian federal election: Fremantle
Party	Candidate	Votes	%	±%
Labor	Josh Wilson	34,636	38.02	−2.97
Liberal	Nicole Robins	31,862	34.97	−1.90
Greens	Jesse Hutchinson	14,574	16.00	−1.74
One Nation	Brett Weary	3,485	3.83	+3.83
Western Australia	Janetia Knapp	2,333	2.56	+2.56
United Australia	Fatima Lever	1,767	1.94	+1.94
Christians	Laetisia Mulder	1,456	1.60	+1.60
Socialist Alliance	Sam Wainwright	990	1.09	−0.56
Total formal votes		91,103	94.60	−1.40
Informal votes		5,199	5.40	+1.40
Turnout		96,302	91.38	+2.57
Two-party-preferred result
Labor	Josh Wilson	51,852	56.92	−0.60
Liberal	Nicole Robins	39,251	43.08	+0.60
Labor hold		Swing	−0.60	

=== Hasluck ===
2019 Australian federal election: Hasluck
Party	Candidate	Votes	%	±%
Liberal	Ken Wyatt	36,737	43.62	−1.33
Labor	James Martin	25,794	30.63	−4.63
Greens	Lee-Anne Miles	9,648	11.46	−1.20
One Nation	Tim Orr	4,445	5.28	+5.28
Shooters, Fishers, Farmers	Fiona White-Hartig	2,441	2.90	+2.90
United Australia	Mike Dale	1,929	2.29	+2.29
Christians	Brady Williams	1,678	1.99	−1.45
Western Australia	Stephen Phelan	1,546	1.84	+1.84
Total formal votes		84,218	94.52	−1.44
Informal votes		4,880	5.48	+1.44
Turnout		89,098	90.34	+1.52
Two-party-preferred result
Liberal	Ken Wyatt	46,494	55.21	+3.16
Labor	James Martin	37,724	44.79	−3.16
Liberal hold		Swing	+3.16	

=== Moore ===
2019 Australian federal election: Moore
Party	Candidate	Votes	%	±%
Liberal	Ian Goodenough	45,503	51.25	−3.73
Labor	Tony O'Gorman	21,760	24.51	−4.18
Greens	Daniel Vujcich	10,735	12.09	−0.59
One Nation	Tyler Walsh	4,113	4.63	+4.63
Independent	Ziggi Murphy	2,390	2.69	+2.69
United Australia	Rod Chilcott	1,591	1.79	+1.79
Western Australia	Jen Jacobs	1,428	1.61	+1.61
Christians	Rex Host	1,259	1.42	−2.23
Total formal votes		88,779	94.92	−1.88
Informal votes		4,748	5.08	+1.88
Turnout		93,527	92.12	+1.58
Two-party-preferred result
Liberal	Ian Goodenough	54,735	61.65	+0.63
Labor	Tony O'Gorman	34,044	38.35	−0.63
Liberal hold		Swing	+0.63	

=== O'Connor ===
2019 Australian federal election: O'Connor
Party	Candidate	Votes	%	±%
Liberal	Rick Wilson	36,135	42.04	−0.63
Labor	Shelley Payne	18,243	21.22	+0.30
National	John Hassell	10,795	12.56	−5.77
One Nation	Dean Smith	7,252	8.44	+8.44
Greens	Nelson Gilmour	7,245	8.43	−1.94
Christians	Ian 't Hart	2,527	2.94	−1.08
United Australia	Anthony Fels	1,598	1.86	+1.86
Western Australia	Peter Swift	1,279	1.49	+1.49
Great Australian	Nicholas Robinson	883	1.03	+1.03
Total formal votes		85,957	93.69	−2.50
Informal votes		5,785	6.31	+2.50
Turnout		91,742	90.03	+1.24
Two-party-preferred result
Liberal	Rick Wilson	55,421	64.48	−0.56
Labor	Shelley Payne	30,536	35.52	+0.56
Liberal hold		Swing	−0.56	

=== Pearce ===
2019 Australian federal election: Pearce
Party	Candidate	Votes	%	±%
Liberal	Christian Porter	43,689	43.72	−1.72
Labor	Kim Travers	29,027	29.05	−5.20
Greens	Eugene Marshall	8,676	8.68	−2.28
One Nation	Sandy Old	8,199	8.21	+8.21
United Australia	Rob Forster	2,495	2.50	+2.50
Shooters, Fishers, Farmers	Ross Williamson	2,125	2.13	+2.13
Christians	Magdeleen Strauss	1,609	1.61	+1.61
Independent	Colin Butland	1,456	1.46	+1.46
National	Steve Blyth	1,342	1.34	−3.35
Western Australia	Michael Calautti	1,305	1.31	+1.31
Total formal votes		99,923	93.03	−2.42
Informal votes		7,491	6.97	+2.42
Turnout		107,414	89.82	+2.47
Two-party-preferred result
Liberal	Christian Porter	57,478	57.52	+3.89
Labor	Kim Travers	42,445	42.48	−3.89
Liberal hold		Swing	+3.89	

=== Perth ===
2019 Australian federal election: Perth
Party	Candidate	Votes	%	±%
Liberal	Jim Grayden	32,800	37.40	−4.91
Labor	Patrick Gorman	30,207	34.44	−2.92
Greens	Caroline Perks	16,552	18.87	+1.80
One Nation	Mel Lownds	2,333	2.66	+2.66
Western Australia	Jane Boxall	2,222	2.53	+2.53
United Australia	Chas Hopkins	1,661	1.89	+1.89
Science	Gary Davies	1,329	1.52	+1.52
VOTEFLUX.ORG	Curtis Greening	602	0.69	+0.69
Total formal votes		87,706	95.41	−0.82
Informal votes		4,220	4.59	+0.82
Turnout		91,926	90.65	+2.61
Two-party-preferred result
Labor	Patrick Gorman	48,176	54.93	+1.60
Liberal	Jim Grayden	39,530	45.07	−1.60
Labor hold		Swing	+1.60	

=== Stirling ===
2019 Australian federal election: Stirling
Party	Candidate	Votes	%	±%
Liberal	Vince Connelly	40,757	46.97	−2.48
Labor	Melita Markey	27,623	31.83	−0.34
Greens	Judith Cullity	10,439	12.03	+0.35
One Nation	Angus Young	3,129	3.61	+3.61
Western Australia	Elizabeth Re	1,750	2.02	+2.02
United Australia	Dorothy Hutton	1,577	1.82	+1.82
Christians	Kevin Host	1,504	1.73	−0.71
Total formal votes		86,779	95.32	−0.53
Informal votes		4,259	4.68	+0.53
Turnout		91,038	89.97	+2.24
Two-party-preferred result
Liberal	Vince Connelly	48,289	55.65	−0.47
Labor	Melita Markey	38,490	44.35	+0.47
Liberal hold		Swing	−0.47	

=== Swan ===
2019 Australian federal election: Swan
Party	Candidate	Votes	%	±%
Liberal	Steve Irons	37,591	44.68	−3.50
Labor	Hannah Beazley	27,953	33.22	+0.21
Greens	Liberty Cramer	10,372	12.33	−2.69
One Nation	Tshung-Hui Chang	2,038	2.42	+2.42
United Australia	Peter McLernon	1,483	1.76	+1.76
Christians	Steve Klomp	1,450	1.72	−2.07
Animal Justice	Virginia Thomas-Wurth	1,302	1.55	+1.55
Western Australia	Sharron Hawkins Zeeb	1,102	1.31	+1.31
Conservative National	Carmel Addink	601	0.71	+0.71
Australia First	Michael Chehoff	251	0.30	+0.30
Total formal votes		84,143	94.19	−2.18
Informal votes		5,190	5.81	+2.18
Turnout		89,333	88.64	+1.80
Two-party-preferred result
Liberal	Steve Irons	44,357	52.72	−0.87
Labor	Hannah Beazley	39,786	47.28	+0.87
Liberal hold		Swing	−0.87	

=== Tangney ===
2019 Australian federal election: Tangney
Party	Candidate	Votes	%	±%
Liberal	Ben Morton	44,740	53.63	+4.82
Labor	Marion Boswell	21,644	25.95	+2.40
Greens	Martin Spencer	9,319	11.17	−1.22
Independent	Jillian Horton	1,933	2.32	+2.32
One Nation	Scott Rafferty	1,732	2.08	+2.08
Christians	Mark Staer	1,695	2.03	−1.34
Western Australia	Gavin Waugh	1,080	1.29	+1.29
United Australia	Chris Fernandez	969	1.16	+1.16
Independent	Paul Waddy	307	0.37	+0.37
Total formal votes		83,419	95.61	−1.84
Informal votes		3,831	4.39	+1.84
Turnout		87,250	92.47	+1.27
Two-party-preferred result
Liberal	Ben Morton	51,275	61.47	+0.40
Labor	Marion Boswell	32,144	38.53	−0.40
Liberal hold		Swing	+0.40	
