= 2022 Australian House of Representatives election =

2022 Australian federal election (House of Representatives)
- 21 May 2022
- All 151 seats in the Australian House of Representatives; 76 seats needed for a majority
- Turnout: 89.82%
Party	Leader	Vote %	Seats	+/–
Labor	Anthony Albanese	32.58%	77	+9
Liberal	Scott Morrison	23.89%	27	−17
Liberal National	David Crisafulli (Note: This party is a result of the merger between the Liberal and National Parties in Queensland in 2008. It is part of the Coalition, and its MPs sit in either the Liberal or National party rooms, meaning the LNP does not have its own federal leader. The party's leader in the Queensland Parliament, David Crisafulli, did not contest this election.)	8.03%	21	−2
National	Barnaby Joyce	3.61%	10	0
Greens	Adam Bandt	12.22%	4	+3
Katter's Australian	Robbie Katter	0.38%	1	0
Centre Alliance	Rebekha Sharkie (Note: Sharkie was the only candidate running for Centre Alliance in this election.)	0.25%	1	0
Independent	—N/a (Note: 7 of the 10 elected independents were associated with the Teal independents movement, but they were elected as independents with no shared party or leader.)	5.29%	10	+7
This lists parties that won seats. See the complete results below.
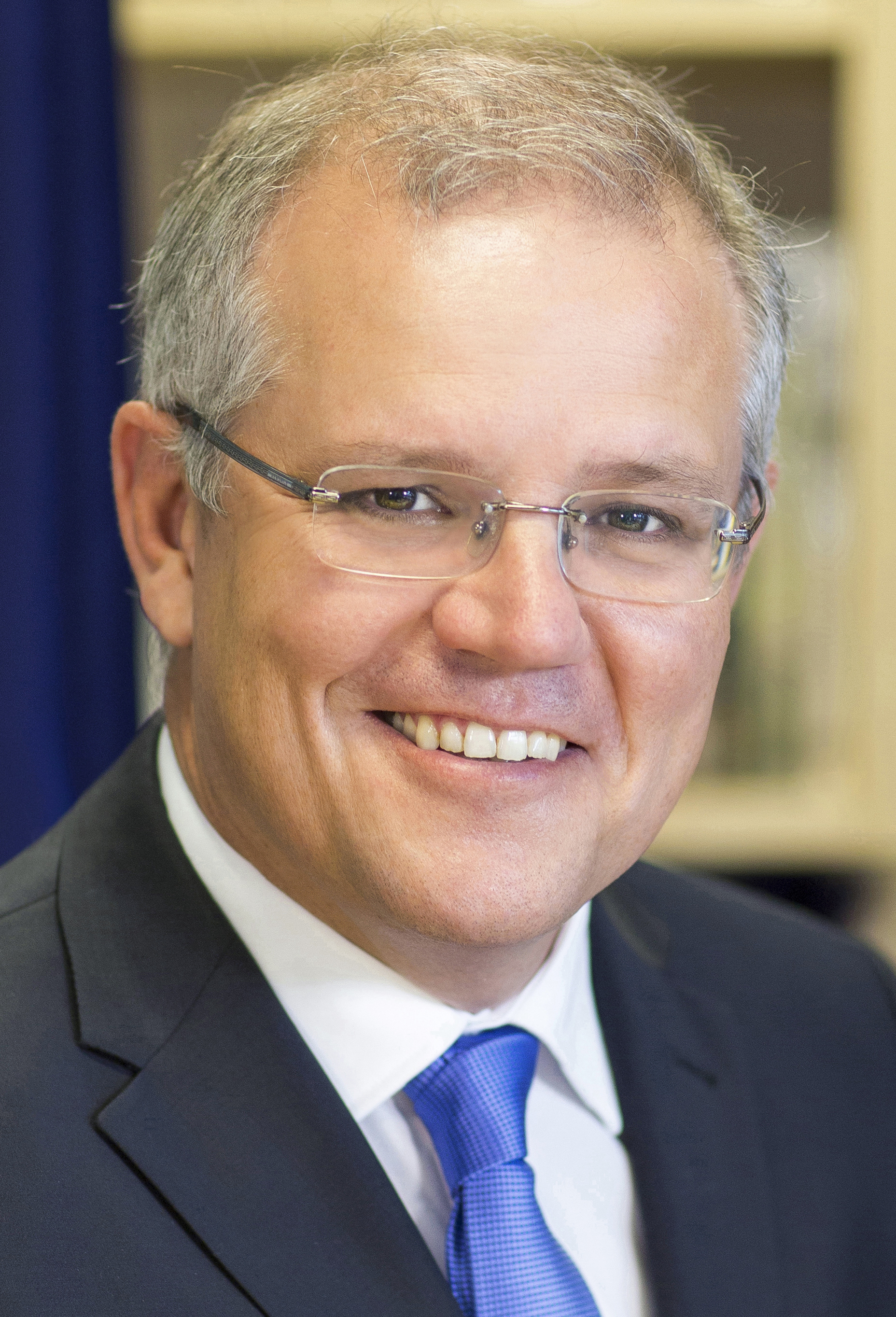

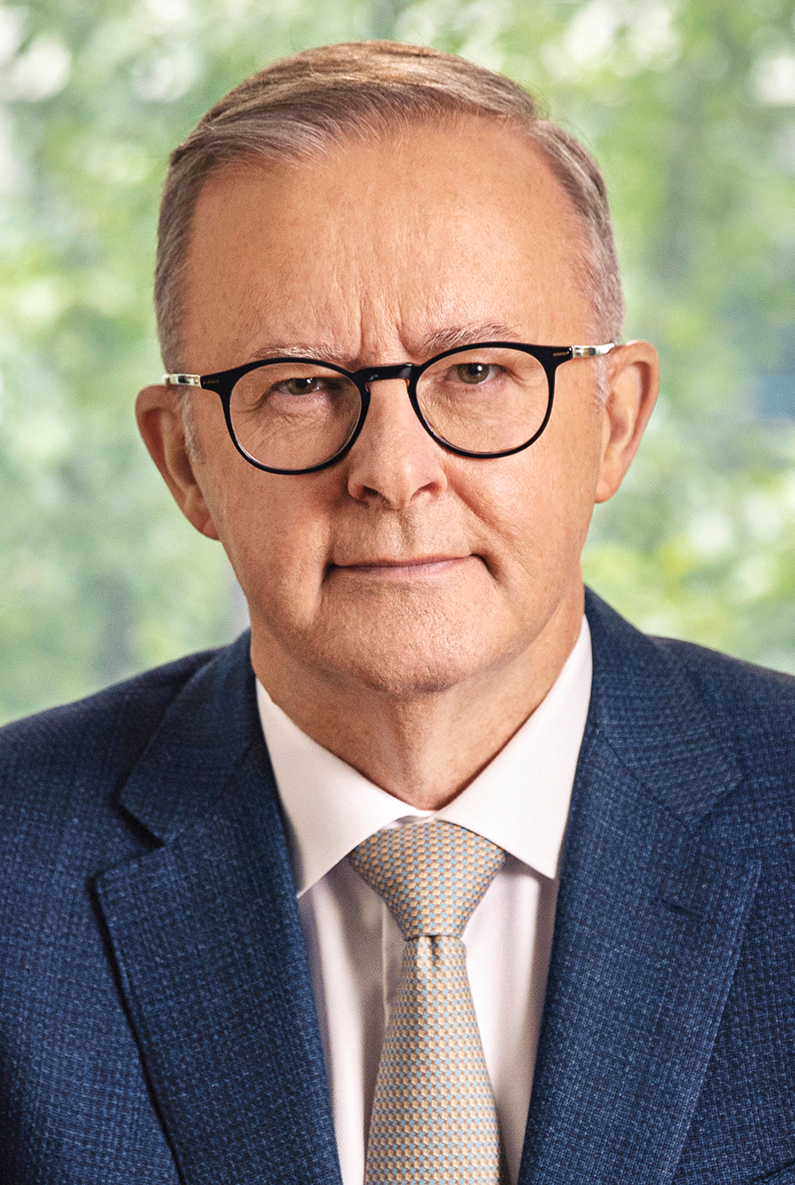
Prime Minister before	Prime Minister after
Scott Morrison; Coalition	Anthony Albanese; Labor

The number of seats won by each party in the Australian House of Representatives at the 2022 federal election were: Coalition 58, Labor 77, Australian Greens 4, Centre Alliance 1, Katter's Australian Party 1, and Independents 10.

This election was held using instant-runoff voting.

== Australia ==
Government (77) Labor (77) Opposition (58) Coalition Liberal (27) LNP (Qld) (21) (Note: 15 LNP MPs sit in the Liberal party room and 6 in the National party room) National (10) Crossbench (16) Independent (10) Greens (4) Centre Alliance (1) Katter's Australian (1)

House of Representatives (IRV – Turnout 89.82% (CV)
Party	Primary vote			Seats	
Party	Votes	%	Swing (pp)	Seats	Change
Liberal	3,502,713	23.89	−4.09	27	▼17
Liberal National (Qld)	1,172,515	8.00	−0.68	21	▼2
National	528,442	3.60	−0.90	10	Steady
Country Liberal (NT)	29,664	0.20	−0.07	0	Steady
Liberal/National Coalition	5,233,334	35.70	−5.73	58	▼19
Labor	4,776,030	32.58	−0.76	77	▲9
Greens	1,795,985	12.25	+1.85	4	▲3
One Nation	727,464	4.96	+1.89	0	Steady
United Australia	604,536	4.12	+0.69	0	Steady
Liberal Democrats	252,963	1.73	+1.49	0	Steady
Animal Justice	87,451	0.60	−0.22	0	Steady
Australian Federation	57,555	0.39	+0.39	0	Steady
Katter's Australian	55,863	0.38	−0.11	1	Steady
Centre Alliance	36,500	0.25	−0.08	1	Steady
Western Australia	33,263	0.23	+0.05	0	Steady
Great Australian	30,392	0.21	+0.17	0	Steady
Victorian Socialists	27,226	0.19	+0.10	0	Steady
Informed Medical Options	25,850	0.18	+0.17	0	Steady
Jacqui Lambie Network	23,730	0.16	+0.16	0	Steady
Australian Christians	19,867	0.14	−0.03	0	Steady
Shooters, Fishers and Farmers	18,422	0.13	−0.16	0	Steady
Fusion	13,319	0.09	+0.09	0	Steady
Socialist Alliance	11,971	0.08	+0.06	0	Steady
Indigenous-Aboriginal	7,326	0.05	+0.05	0	Steady
Justice	6,494	0.04	−0.15	0	Steady
TNL	6,331	0.04	+0.04	0	Steady
Legalise Cannabis	6,025	0.04	+0.04	0	Steady
Australian Values	5,622	0.04	+0.04	0	Steady
Australian Citizens	4,886	0.03	+0.01	0	Steady
Local	4,254	0.03	+0.03	0	Steady
Sustainable Australia	3,866	0.03	−0.22	0	Steady
Democratic Alliance	2,215	0.02	+0.02	0	Steady
Reason	1,458	0.01	−0.05	0	Steady
Australian Progressives	1,063	0.01	−0.04	0	Steady
Australian Democrats	651	0.00	−0.01	0	Steady
Independents	776,169	5.29	+1.92	10	▲7
Total	14,659,042	100.00		151	Steady
Two-party-preferred vote
Labor	7,642,161	52.13	+3.66		
Liberal/National Coalition	7,016,881	47.87	−3.66		
Invalid/blank votes	802,337	5.19	−0.35	–	–
Turnout	15,461,379	89.82	−2.07	–	–
Registered voters	17,213,433	–	–	–	–
Source: AEC for both votes and seats

== States ==
=== New South Wales ===
2022 Australian federal election (New South Wales)
- 21 May 2022

All 47 New South Wales seats in the Australian House of Representatives and 6 seats in the Australian Senate
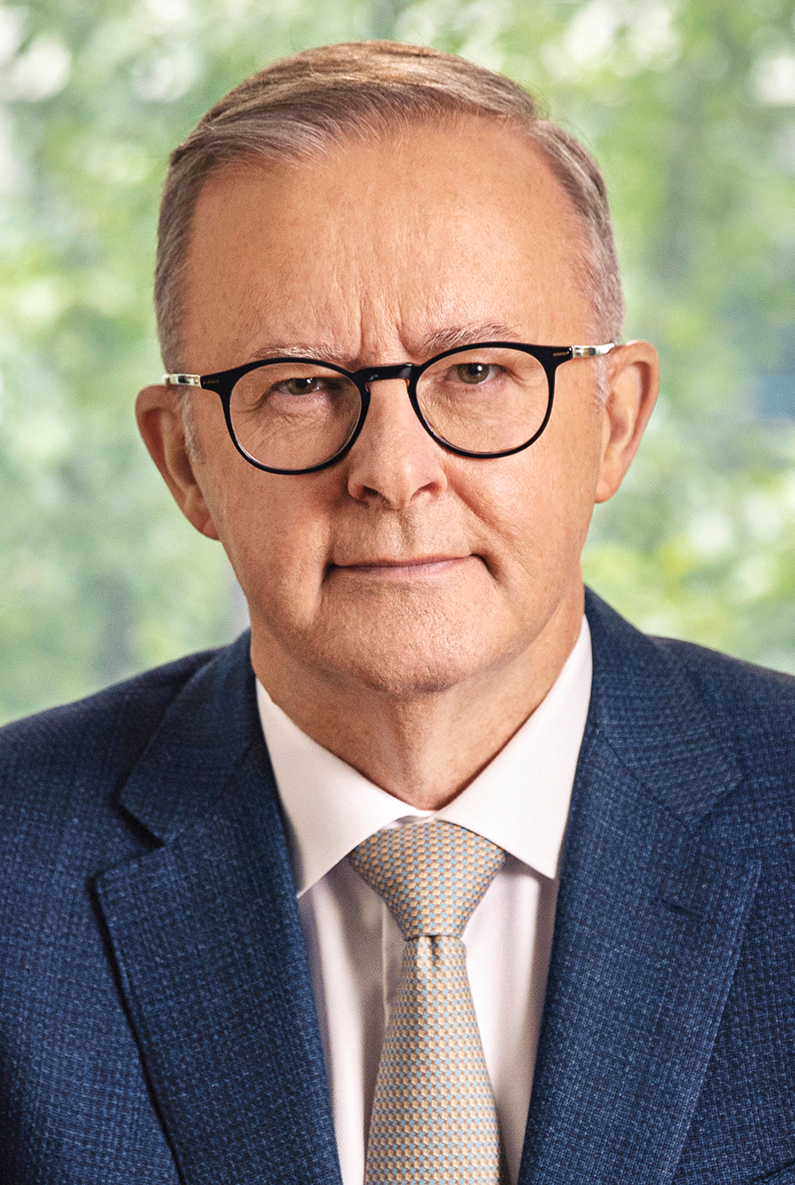

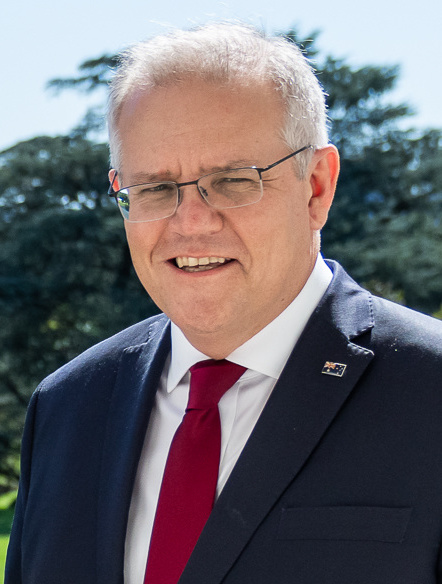
	First party	Second party
Leader	Anthony Albanese	Scott Morrison
Party	Labor	Liberal/National coalition
Last election	24 seats	22 seats
Seats won	26	16
Seat change	▲2	▼6
Popular vote	1,552,684	1,699,324
Percentage	33.38%	36.54%
Swing	▼1.18	▼6.01
TPP	51.42%	48.58%
TPP swing	▲3.20	▼3.20
- Results by division for the House of Representatives, shaded by winning party's margin of victory.

House of Representatives (IRV) – Turnout 90.63% (CV)
Party	Votes	%	Swing (pp)	Seats	Change (seats)
Liberal Party of Australia	1,316,134	28.30	−4.49	9	▼6
National Party of Australia	383,189	8.24	−1.52	7	0
Liberal/National Coalition	1,699,324	36.54	−6.01	16	▼6
Australian Labor Party	1,552,684	33.38	−1.18	26	▲2
Australian Greens	466,069	10.02	+1.31	0	Steady
Pauline Hanson's One Nation	224,965	4.84	+3.53	0	Steady
United Australia Party	183,174	3.94	+0.56	0	Steady
Liberal Democratic Party	96,898	2.08	+1.65	0	Steady
Animal Justice Party	16,979	0.37	−0.29	0	Steady
Shooters, Fishers and Farmers Party	14,727	0.32	−0.08	0	Steady
Informed Medical Options Party	14,171	0.30	+0.27	0	Steady
Fusion	8,520	0.18	+0.18	0	Steady
Indigenous-Aboriginal Party of Australia	7,326	0.16	+0.16	0	Steady
Sustainable Australia	3,423	0.07	−0.53	0	Steady
Australian Federation Party	2,647	0.06	+0.06	0	Steady
Australian Citizens Party	2,372	0.05	+0.05	0	Steady
TNL	1,704	0.04	+0.04	0	Steady
Socialist Alliance	1,518	0.03	+0.03	0	Steady
Drew Pavlou Democratic Alliance	1,208	0.03	+0.03	0	Steady
Australian Democrats	651	0.01	+0.01	0	Steady
Independent	351,620	7.56	+2.94	5	▲4
Non Affiliated	961	0.02	+0.02	0	Steady
Total	4,650,940	100.00		47	Steady
Invalid/blank votes	308,644	6.22	−0.79	–	–
Turnout	4,959,584	90.70	−1.46	–	–
Registered voters	5,467,993	–	–	–	–
Two-party-preferred vote
Labor	2,391,301	51.42	+3.20		
Liberal/National Coalition	2,259,639	48.58	−3.20		
Source: AEC for both and

=== Victoria ===
2022 Australian federal election (Victoria)
- 21 May 2022

All 39 Victorian seats in the Australian House of Representatives and 6 seats in the Australian Senate
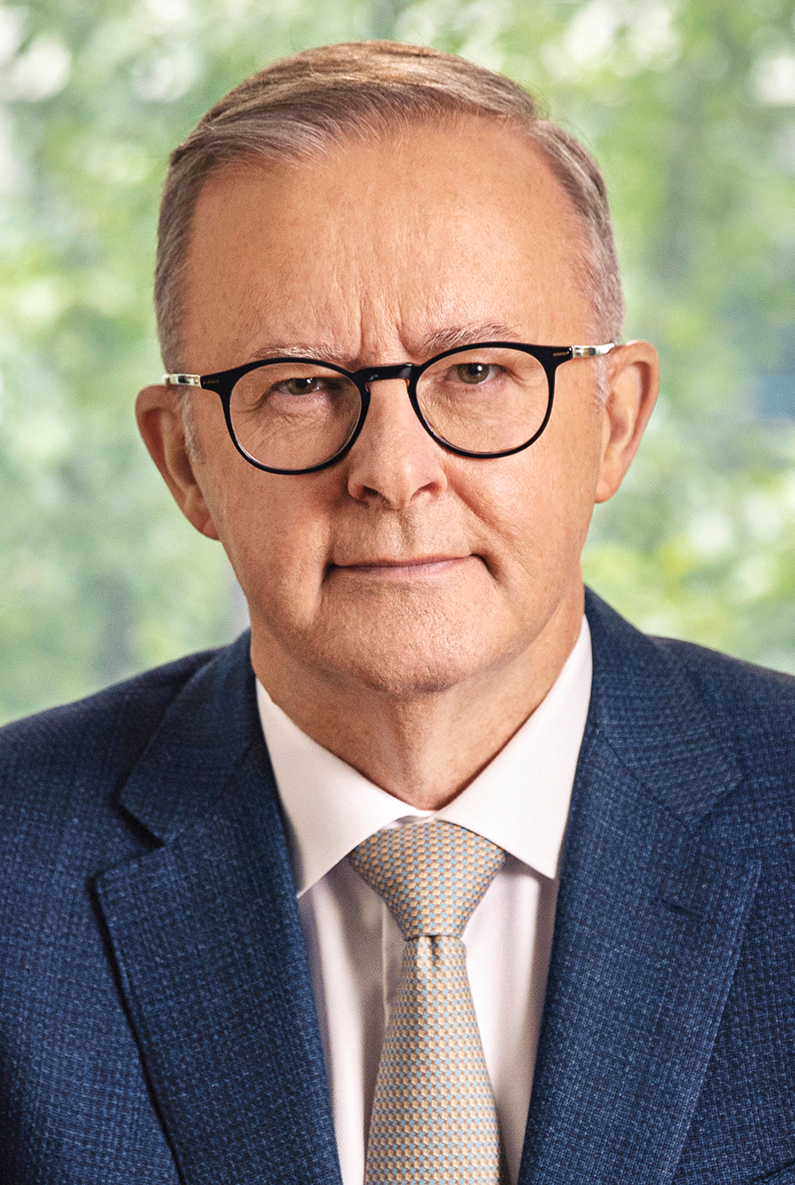

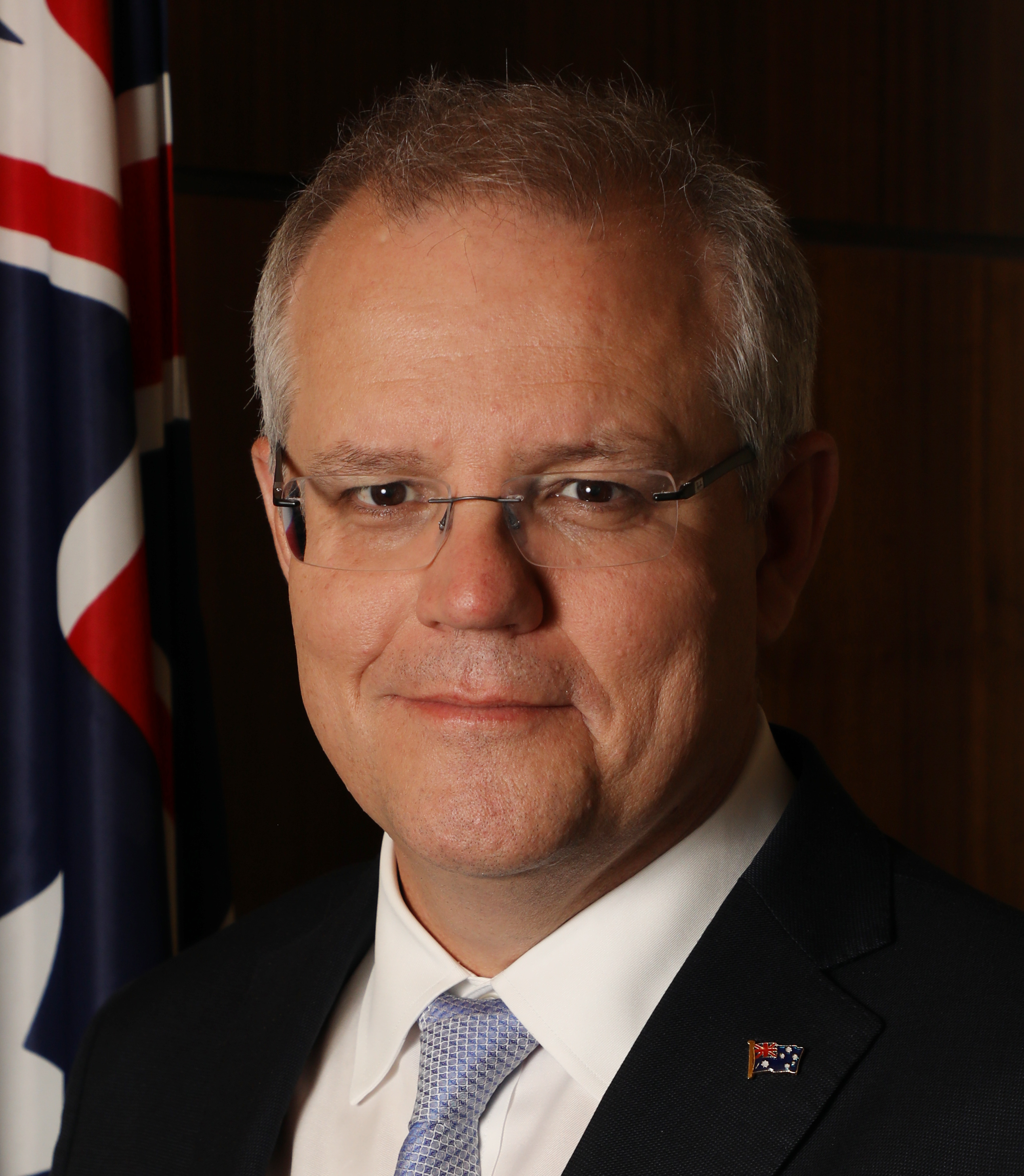

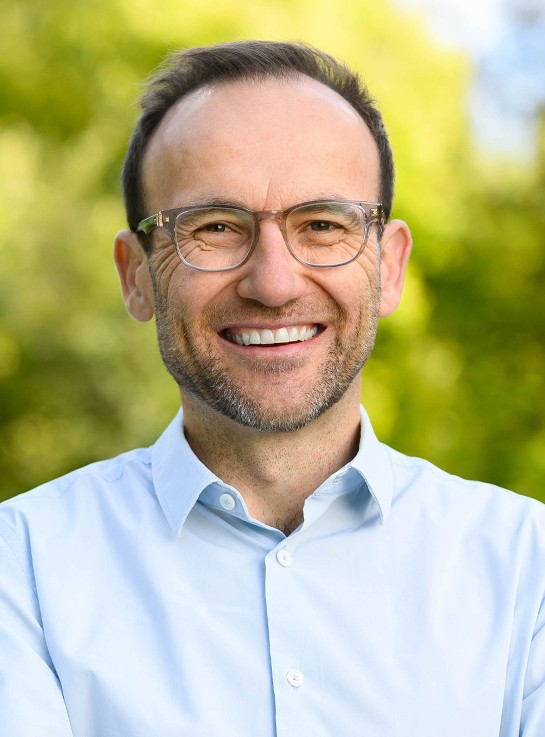
	First party	Second party	Third party
Leader	Anthony Albanese	Scott Morrison	Adam Bandt
Party	Labor	Liberal/National coalition	Greens
Last election	21 seats	15 seats	1 seat
Seats won	24	11	1
Seat change	▲3	▼4	Steady
Primary vote	1,230,842	1,239,280	514,893
Percentage	32.85%	33.08%	13.74%
Swing	▼4.01	▼5.18	▲1.85
TPP	54.83%	45.17%
TPP swing	▲1.69	▼1.69
- Results by division for the House of Representatives, shaded by winning party's margin of victory.

House of Representatives (IRV) – Turnout 90.59% (CV)
Party	Votes	%	Swing (pp)	Seats	Change (seats) (Note: Due to Victoria gaining an extra seat with the creation of the Division of Hawke, numbers of seats lost and gained do not add up.)
Liberal Party of Australia	1,105,718	29.51	−5.37	8	▼4
National Party of Australia	133,562	3.57	−0.13	3	0
Liberal/National Coalition	1,239,280	33.08	−5.18	11	▼4
Australian Labor Party	1,230,842	32.85	−4.01	24	▲3
Australian Greens	514,893	13.74	+1.85	1	Steady
United Australia Party	177,745	4.74	+1.10	0	Steady
Pauline Hanson's One Nation	143,558	3.83	+2.88	0	Steady
Liberal Democratic Party	94,626	2.53	+2.53	0	Steady
Animal Justice Party	28,205	0.75	−0.37	0	Steady
Victorian Socialists	27,226	0.73	+0.39	0	Steady
Australian Federation Party	20,439	0.55	+0.55	0	Steady
Derryn Hinch's Justice Party	6,494	0.17	−0.56	0	Steady
Socialist Alliance	5,540	0.15	+0.15	0	Steady
The Great Australian Party	4,880	0.13	+0.06	0	Steady
TNL	2,405	0.06	+0.06	0	Steady
Fusion	2,238	0.06	+0.06	0	Steady
Australian Citizens Party	2,017	0.05	−0.04	0	Steady
Reason Party	1,458	0.04	−0.20	0	Steady
Sustainable Australia	443	0.01	−0.17	0	Steady
Australian Values Party	152	0.00	+0.00	0	Steady
Independent	243,992	6.51	+2.59	3	▲2
Total	3,746,433	100.00		39	▲1
Invalid/blank votes	185,174	4.71	+0.05	–	–
Turnout	3,931,607	90.59	−2.03	–	–
Registered voters	4,339,960	–	–	–	–
Two-party-preferred vote
Labor	2,054,061	54.83	+1.69		
Liberal/National Coalition	1,692,372	45.17	−1.69		
Source: AEC for both votes and seats

=== Queensland ===
2022 Australian federal election (Queensland)
- 21 May 2022

All 30 Queensland seats in the Australian House of Representatives and 6 seats in the Australian Senate
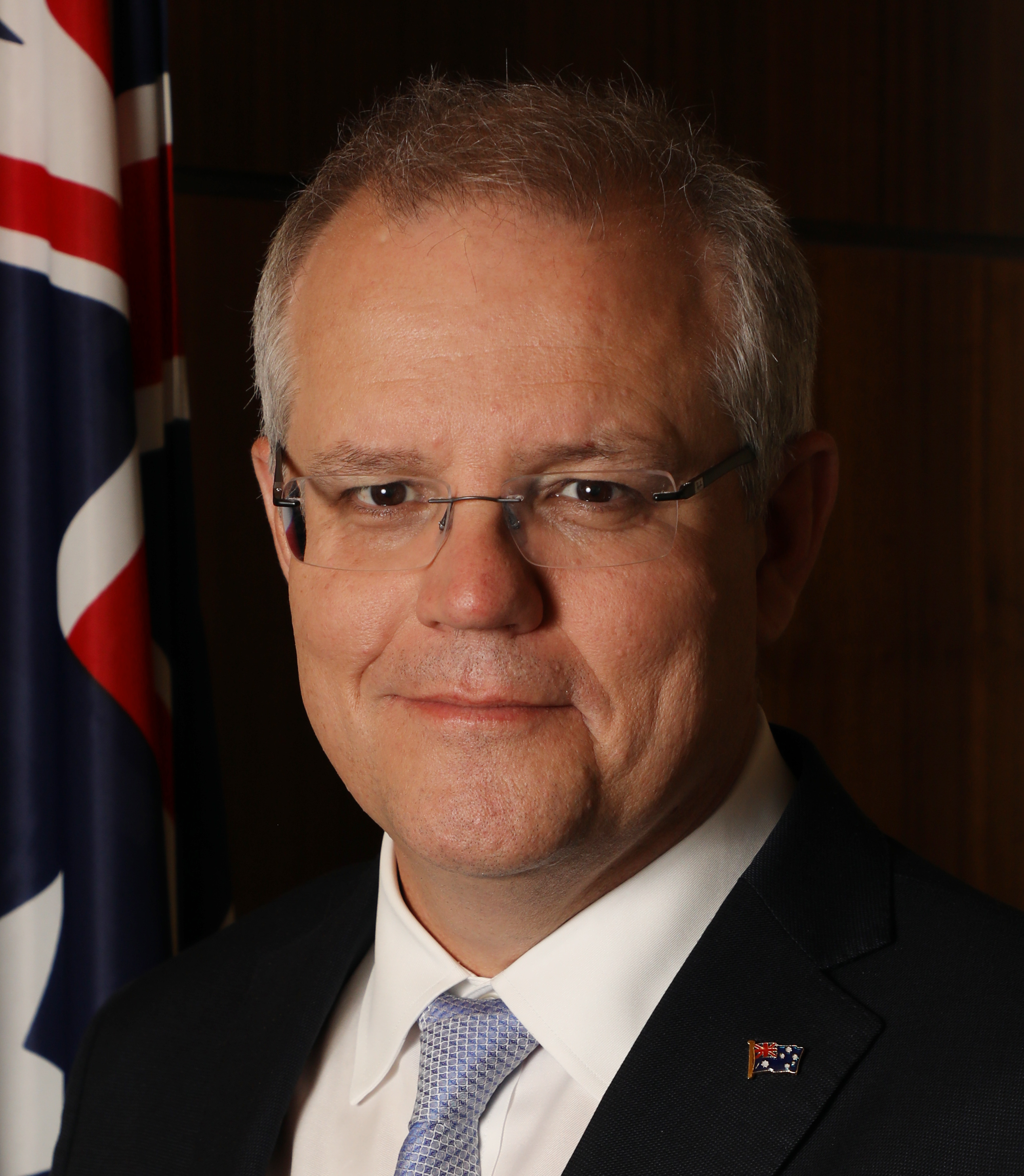

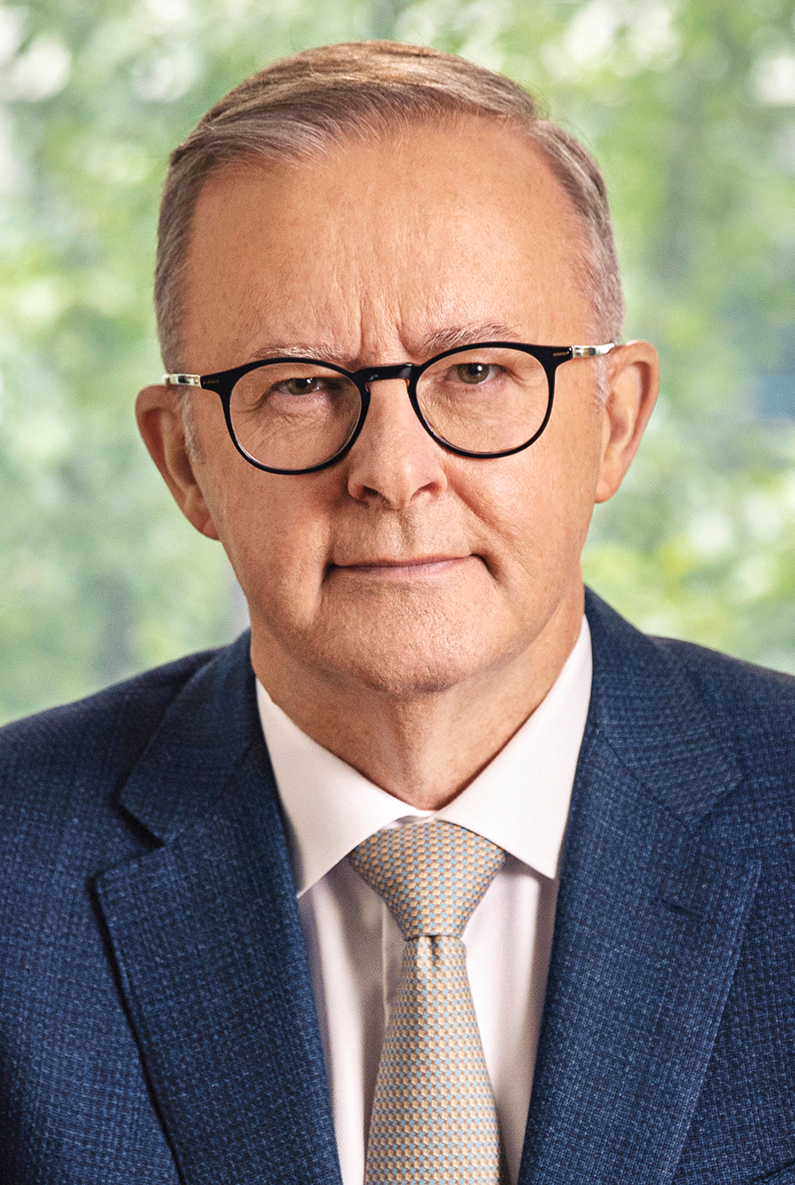

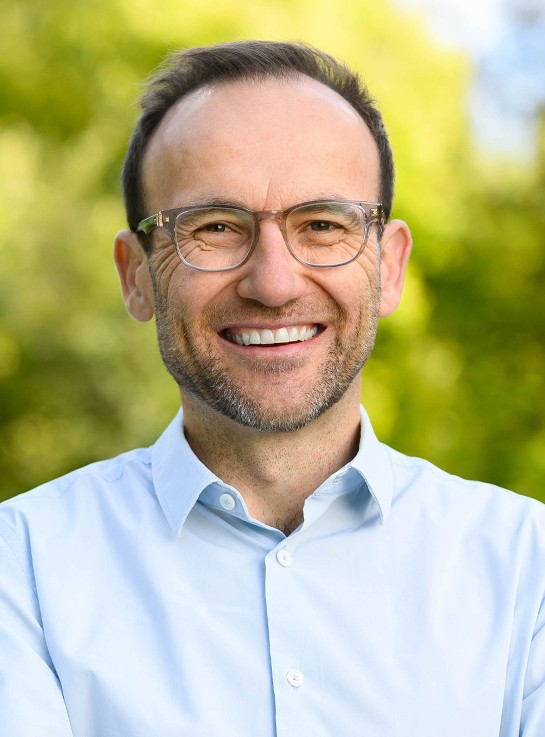

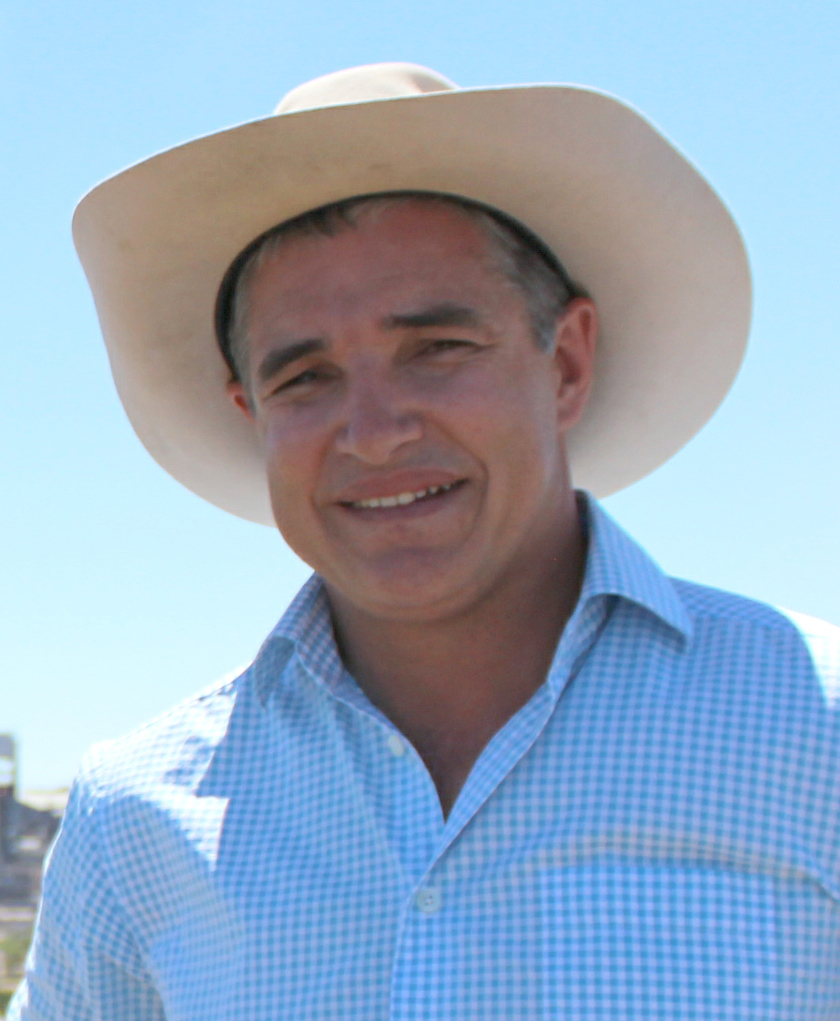
	First party	Second party
Leader	Scott Morrison	Anthony Albanese
Party	Liberal/National coalition	Labor
Last election	23 seats	6 seats
Seats won	21	5
Seat change	▼2	▼1
Popular vote	1,172,515	811,069
Percentage	39.64%	27.42%
Swing	▼4.06	▲0.74
TPP	54.05%	45.95%
TPP swing	▼4.39	▲4.39
	Third party	Fourth party
Leader	Adam Bandt	Robbie Katter
Party	Greens	Katter's Australian
Last election	0 seats	1 seat
Seats won	3	1
Seat change	▲3	Steady
Popular vote	382,900	55,863
Percentage	12.94%	1.89%
Swing	▲2.62	▼0.58
- Results by division for the House of Representatives, shaded by winning party's margin of victory.

House of Representatives (IRV) – Turnout 88.16% (CV)
Party	Votes	%	Swing (pp)	Seats	Change (seats)
Liberal National Party (Qld)	1,172,515	39.64	−4.06	21	▼2
Australian Labor Party	811,069	27.42	+0.74	5	▼1
Australian Greens	382,900	12.94	+2.62	3	▲3
Pauline Hanson's One Nation	221,640	7.49	−1.37	0	Steady
United Australia Party	149,255	5.05	+1.54	0	Steady
Katter's Australian Party	55,863	1.89	−0.58	1	Steady
Liberal Democratic Party	28,737	0.97	+0.52	0	Steady
Animal Justice Party	24,813	0.84	+0.40	0	Steady
Informed Medical Options Party	10,894	0.37	+0.37	0	Steady
Australian Federation Party	8,195	0.28	+0.28	0	Steady
The Great Australian Party	7,775	0.26	+0.26	0	Steady
Legalise Cannabis	6,025	0.20	+0.20	0	Steady
Australian Values Party	5,470	0.18	+0.18	0	Steady
Socialist Alliance	3,729	0.13	+0.08	0	Steady
Shooters, Fishers and Farmers Party	3,695	0.12	+0.12	0	Steady
TNL	1,971	0.07	+0.07	0	Steady
Fusion	930	0.03	+0.03	0	Steady
Australian Progressives	606	0.02	−0.01	0	Steady
Independent	61,944	2.09	+0.82	0	Steady
Total	2,958,026	100.00	–	30	Steady
Invalid/blank votes	128,732	4.17	−0.78	–	–
Turnout	3,086,758	88.16	–3.06	–	–
Registered voters	3,501,287	–	–	–	–
Two-party-preferred vote
Liberal National	1,598,802	54.05	–4.39	–	–
Labor	1,359,224	45.95	+4.39	–	–
Source: AEC for both votes and seats

=== Western Australia ===
2022 Australian federal election (Western Australia)
- 21 May 2022

All 15 Western Australian seats in the Australian House of Representatives and 6 (of 12) Western Australian seats in the Australian Senate
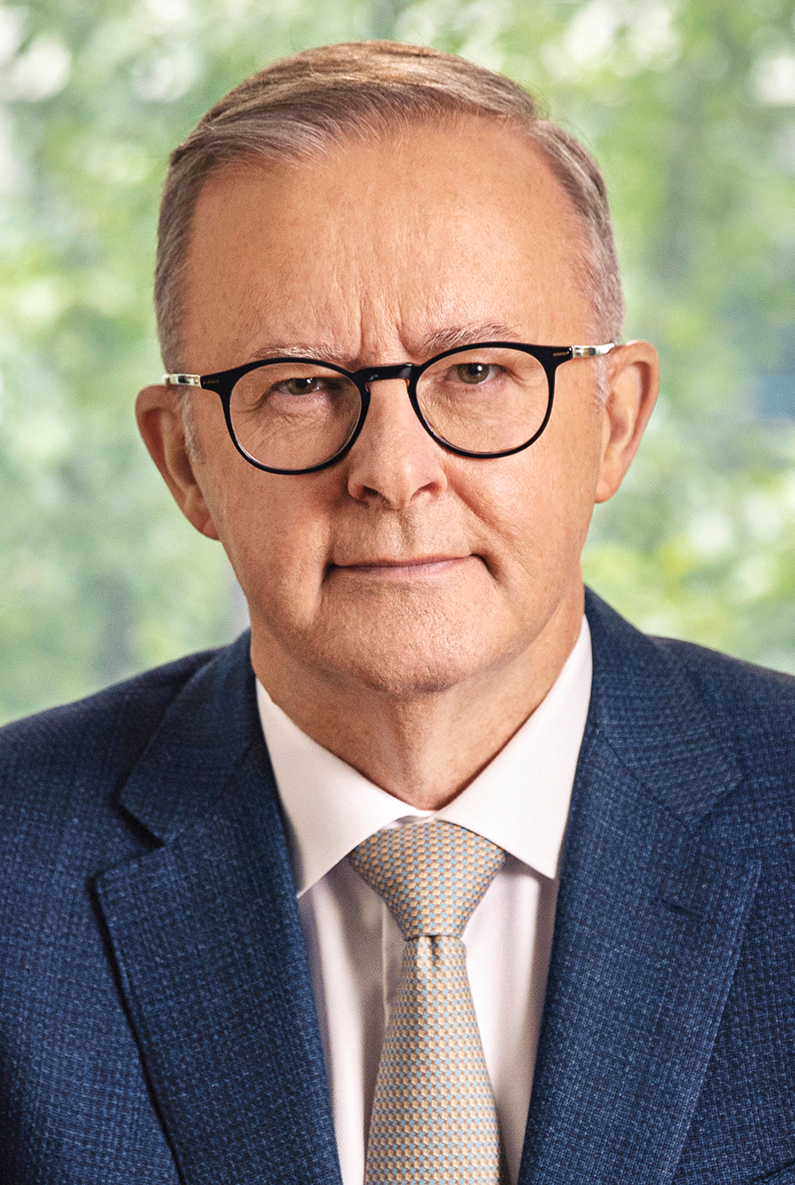

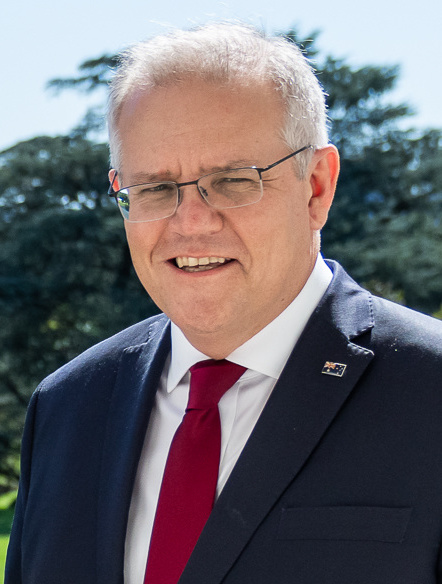
	First party	Second party
Leader	Anthony Albanese	Scott Morrison
Party	Labor	Liberal/National coalition
Last election	5 seats	11 seats
Seats won	9	5
Seat change	▲4	▼6
Popular vote	542,667	512,414
Percentage	36.84%	34.78%
Swing	▲7.04	▼10.44
TPP	55.00%	45.00%
TPP swing	▲10.55	▼10.55
- Results by division for the House of Representatives, shaded by winning party's margin of victory.

House of Representatives (IRV) – Turnout 87.99% (CV)
Party	Votes	%	Swing (pp)	Seats	Change (seats)
Australian Labor Party	542,667	36.84	+7.04	9	▲4
Liberal Party of Australia	503,254	34.16	−9.63	5	▼6
National Party of Australia	9,160	0.62	−0.81	0	Steady
Coalition total	512,414	34.78	−10.44	5	▼6
Australian Greens	184,094	12.50	+0.88	0	Steady
Pauline Hanson's One Nation	58,226	3.95	−1.36	0	Steady
United Australia Party	33,863	2.30	+0.27	0	Steady
Western Australia Party	33,263	2.26	+0.46	0	Steady
Australian Christians	19,867	1.35	−0.35	0	Steady
The Great Australian Party	16,553	1.12	+1.06	0	Steady
Australian Federation Party	15,920	1.08	+1.08	0	Steady
Liberal Democratic Party	12,897	0.88	+0.88	0	Steady
Animal Justice Party	5,524	0.37	+0.28	0	Steady
Socialist Alliance	1,184	0.08	+0.01	0	Steady
Informed Medical Options Party	785	0.05	+0.05	0	Steady
Independents	35,968	2.44	+1.34	1	▲1
Total	1,473,225	100.00	–	15	▼1
Invalid/blank votes	86,057	5.52	+0.08	–	–
Turnout	1,559,282	87.99	−2.06	–	–
Registered voters	1,772,065	–	–	–	–
Two-party-preferred vote
Labor	810,206	55.00	+10.55		
Liberal	663,019	45.00	−10.55		
Source: AEC for both votes and seats

=== South Australia ===
2022 Australian federal election (South Australia)
- 21 May 2022

All 10 South Australian seats in the Australian House of Representatives and 6 seats in the Australian Senate
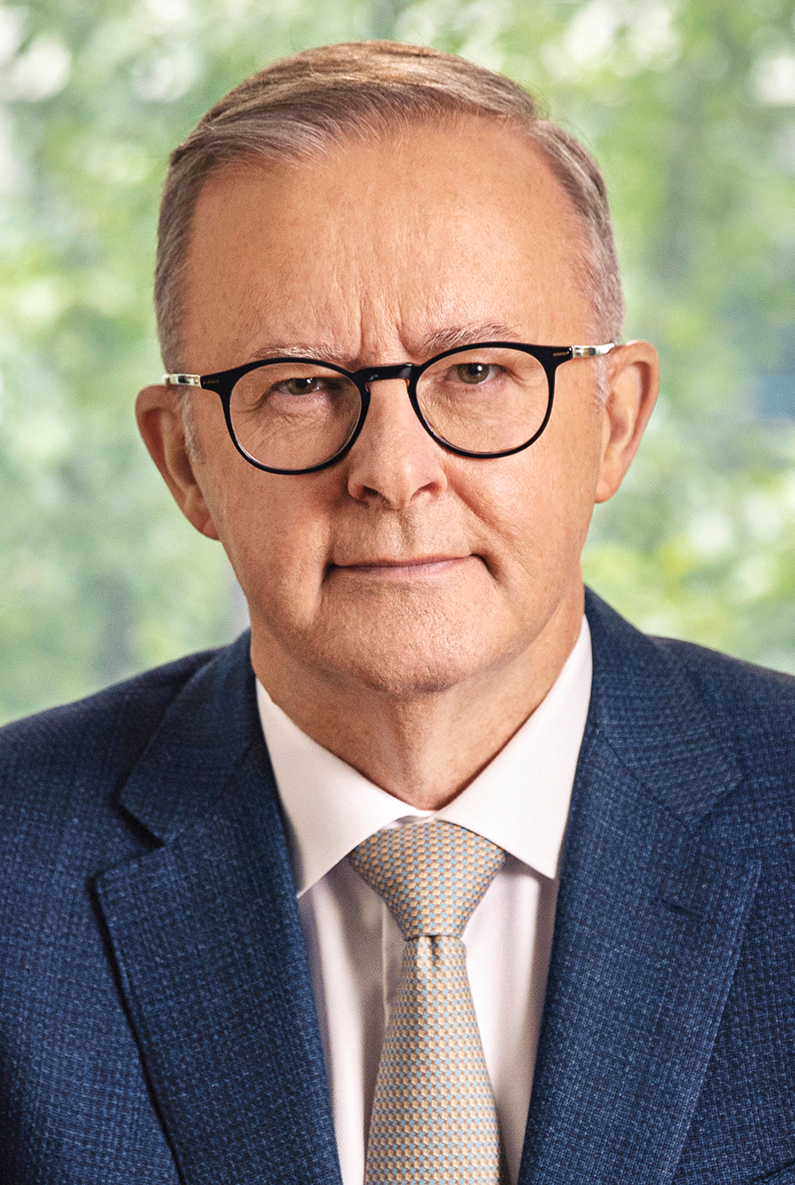

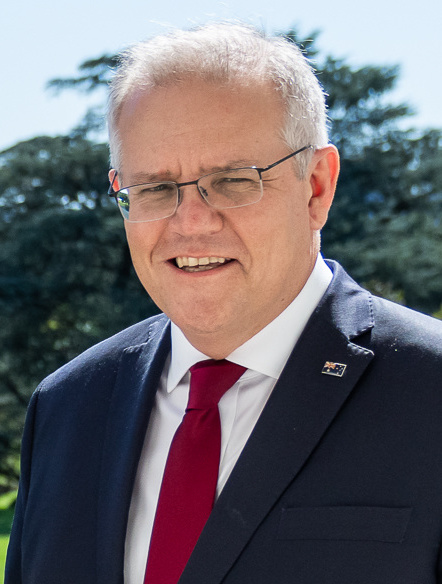
	First party	Second party	Third party
			CA
Leader	Anthony Albanese	Scott Morrison	No leader
Party	Labor	Liberal/National coalition	Centre Alliance
Last election	5 seats	4 seats	1 seat
Seats won	6	3	1
Seat change	▲1	▼1	Steady
Popular vote	378,329	390,195	36,500
Percentage	34.46%	35.54%	3.32%
Swing	▼0.92	▼5.29	▼1.06
TPP	53.97%	46.03%
TPP swing	▲3.26	▼3.26
- Results by division for the House of Representatives, shaded by winning party's margin of victory.

House of Representatives (IRV) – Turnout 91.07% (CV)
Party	Votes	%	Swing	Seats	Change
Liberal/National Coalition
Liberal Party of Australia	387,664	35.31	–5.26	3	▼1
National Party of Australia	2,531	0.23	–0.03	0	Steady
Liberal/National Coalition	390,195	35.54	−5.29	3	▼1
Australian Labor Party	378,329	34.46	–0.92	6	▲1
Australian Greens	140,227	12.77	+3.16	0	Steady
Pauline Hanson's One Nation	53,057	4.83	+3.99	0	Steady
United Australia Party	42,688	3.89	–0.40	0	Steady
Centre Alliance	36,500	3.32	–1.06	1	Steady
Australian Federation Party	10,354	0.94	+0.94	0	Steady
Animal Justice Party	7,158	0.65	–2.13	0	Steady
Liberal Democratic Party	5,248	0.48	+0.48	0	Steady
Fusion	1,631	0.15	+0.15	0	Steady
The Great Australian Party	1,184	0.11	+0.11	0	Steady
Drew Pavlou Democratic Alliance	1,007	0.09	+0.09	0	Steady
Australian Progressives	457	0.04	–0.01	0	Steady
TNL	251	0.02	+0.02	0	Steady
Independents	29,500	2.69	+1.48	0	Steady
Total	1,097,786			10	
Invalid/blank votes	59,222	5.12	+0.31	–	–
Turnout	1,157,008	91.07	–2.00	–	–
Registered voters	1,270,400	–	–	–	–
Two-party-preferred vote
Labor	592,512	53.97	+3.26	–	–
Liberal	505,274	46.03	–3.26	–	–
Source: AEC for both votes and seats

=== Tasmania ===
2022 Australian federal election (Tasmania)
- 21 May 2022

All 5 Tasmanian seats in the Australian House of Representatives and 6 seats in the Australian Senate
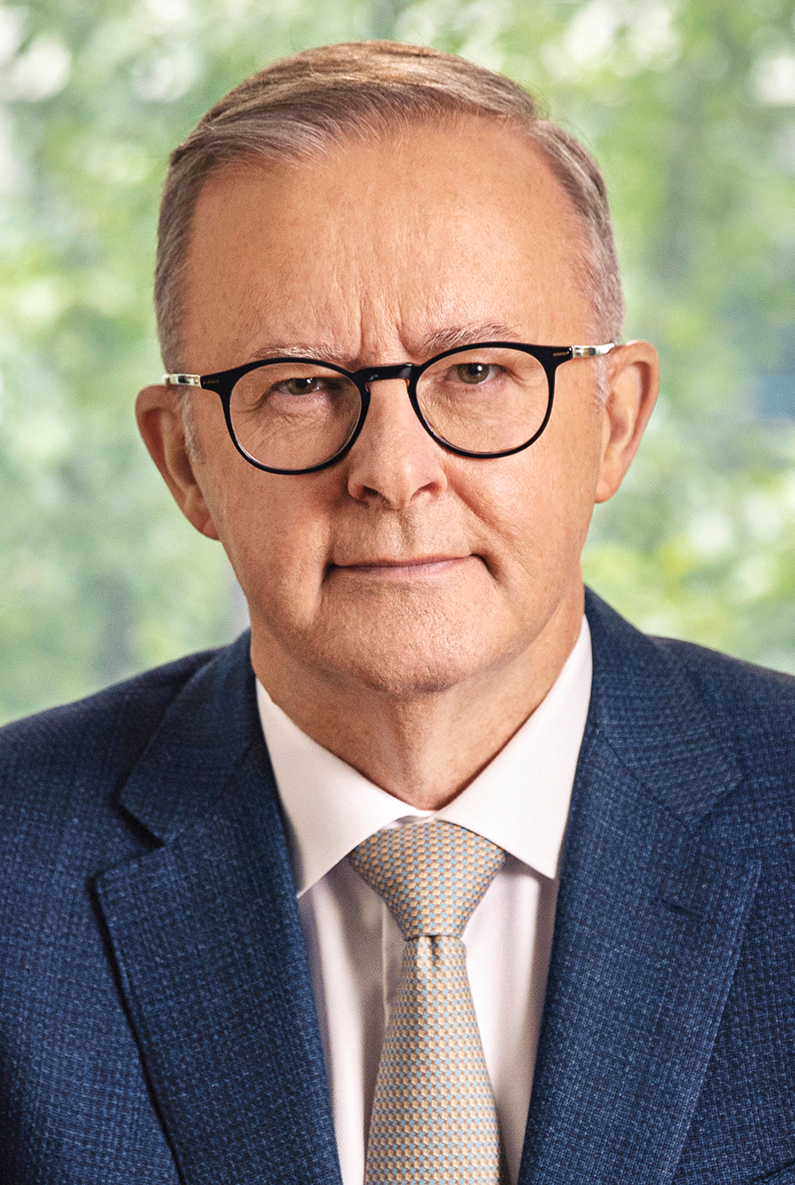

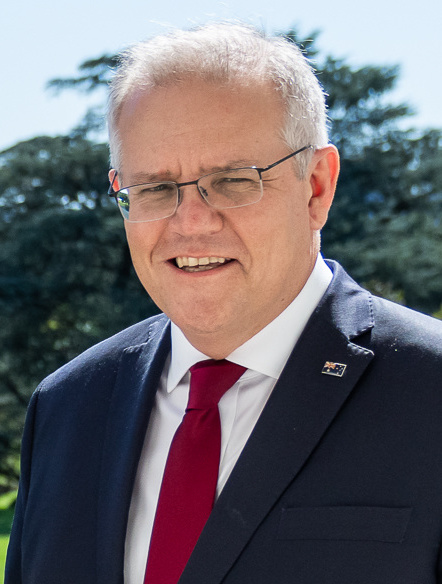
	First party	Second party
Leader	Anthony Albanese	Scott Morrison
Party	Labor	Liberal
Last election	2 seats	2 seats
Seats won	2	2
Seat change	Steady	Steady
Popular vote	95,322	115,184
Percentage	27.26%	32.94%
Swing	▼6.35	▲2.31
TPP	54.33%	45.67%
TPP swing	▼1.63	▲1.63
- Results by division for the House of Representatives, shaded by winning party's margin of victory.

House of Representatives (IRV) – Turnout 92.43% (CV)
Party	Votes	%	Swing (pp)	Seats	Change (seats)
Liberal Party of Australia	115,184	32.94	+2.31	2	Steady
Australian Labor Party	95,322	27.26	−6.35	2	Steady
Australian Greens	41,972	12.00	+1.88	0	Steady
Jacqui Lambie Network	23,730	6.79	+6.79	0	Steady
Pauline Hanson's One Nation	13,970	3.99	+1.20	0	Steady
United Australia Party	6,437	1.84	−3.01	0	Steady
Liberal Democratic Party	5,064	1.45	+1.45	0	Steady
Animal Justice Party	4,772	1.36	+0.88	0	Steady
Local Party	4,254	1.22	+1.22	0	Steady
Independent	38,993	11.50	−1.84	1	Steady
Total	349,698			5	Steady
Invalid/blank votes	21,734	5.85	+1.46	–	–
Turnout	371,432	92.43	–1.91	–	–
Registered voters	401,852	–	–	–	–
Two-party-preferred vote
Labor	189,993	54.33	−1.63	–	–
Liberal	159,705	45.67	+1.63	–	–
Source: AEC for both votes and seats

== Territories ==
=== Australian Capital Territory ===
2022 Australian federal election (Australian Capital Territory)
- 21 May 2022

All 3 Australian Capital Territory seats in the Australian House of Representatives and all 2 seats in the Australian Senate
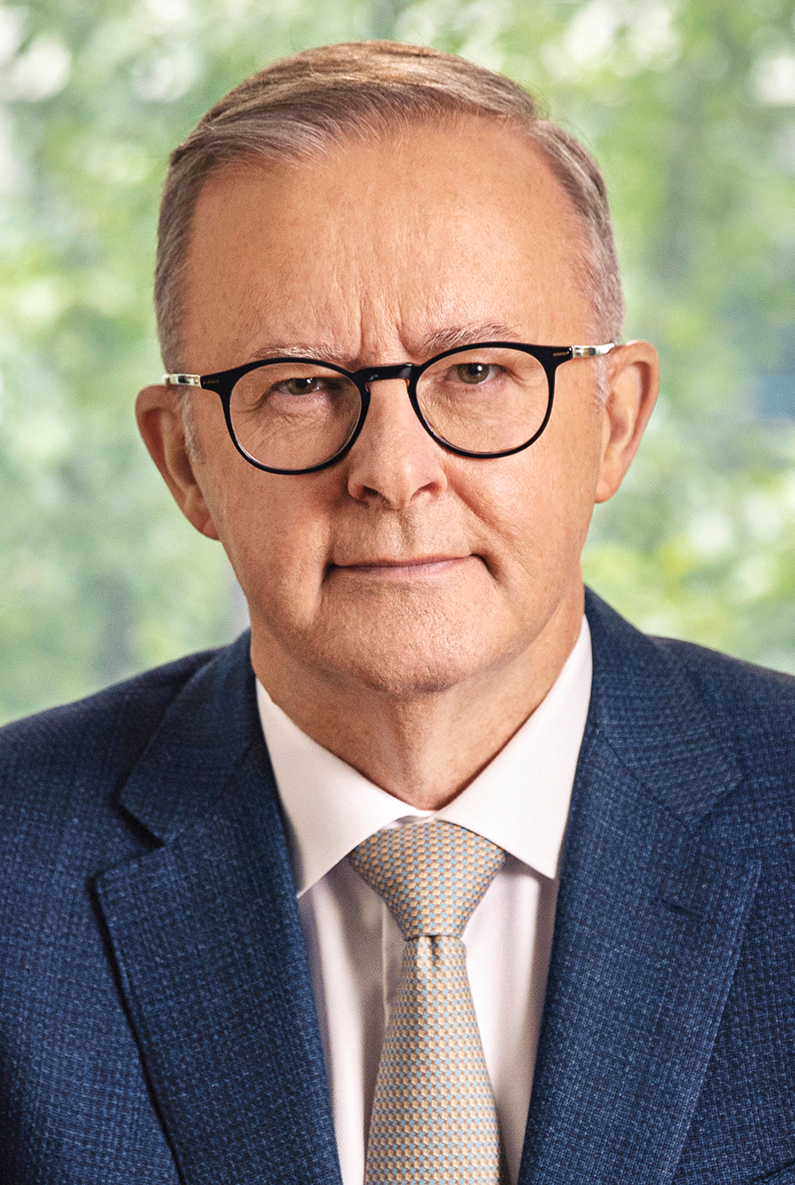

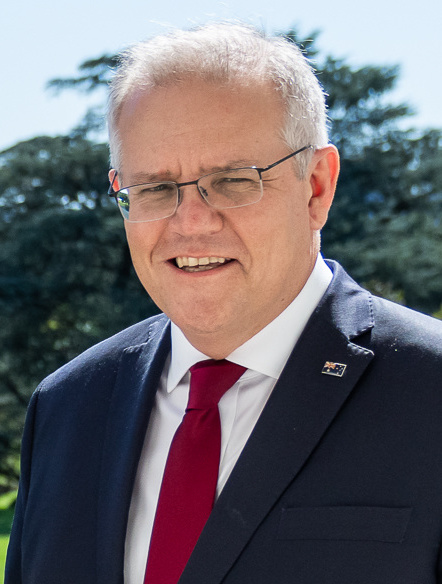
	First party	Second party
Leader	Anthony Albanese	Scott Morrison
Party	Labor	Liberal
Last election	3 seats	0 seats
Seats won	3 seats	0 seats
Seat change	Steady	Steady
Popular vote	126,595	74,759
Percentage	44.89%	26.51%
Swing	▲3.80	▼4.81
TPP	66.95%	33.05%
TPP swing	▲5.34	▼5.34
- Results by division for the House of Representatives, shaded by winning party's margin of victory.

House of Representatives (IRV) – Turnout 92.07% (CV)
Party	Votes	%	Swing (pp)	Seats	Change (seats)
Australian Labor Party	126,595	44.89	+3.80	3	Steady
Liberal Party of Australia	74,759	26.51	−4.81	0	Steady
Australian Greens	52,648	18.67	+1.82	0	Steady
United Australia Party	6,864	2.43	−0.25	0	Steady
Pauline Hanson's One Nation	6,630	2.35	+2.35	0	Steady
Liberal Democratic Party	1,706	0.60	–0.35	0	Steady
Independent	12,795	4.54	+0.12	0	Steady
Total	281,997	100.00		3	Steady
Invalid/blank votes	7,116	2.46	−1.03	–	–
Turnout	289,113	92.07	–1.08	–	–
Registered voters	314,025	–	–	–	–
Two-party-preferred vote
Labor	188,799	66.95	+5.34	–	–
Liberal	93,198	33.05	–5.34	–	–
Source: AEC for both votes and seats

=== Northern Territory ===
2022 Australian federal election (Northern Territory)
- 21 May 2022

All 2 Northern Territory seats in the Australian House of Representatives and all 2 seats in the Australian Senate
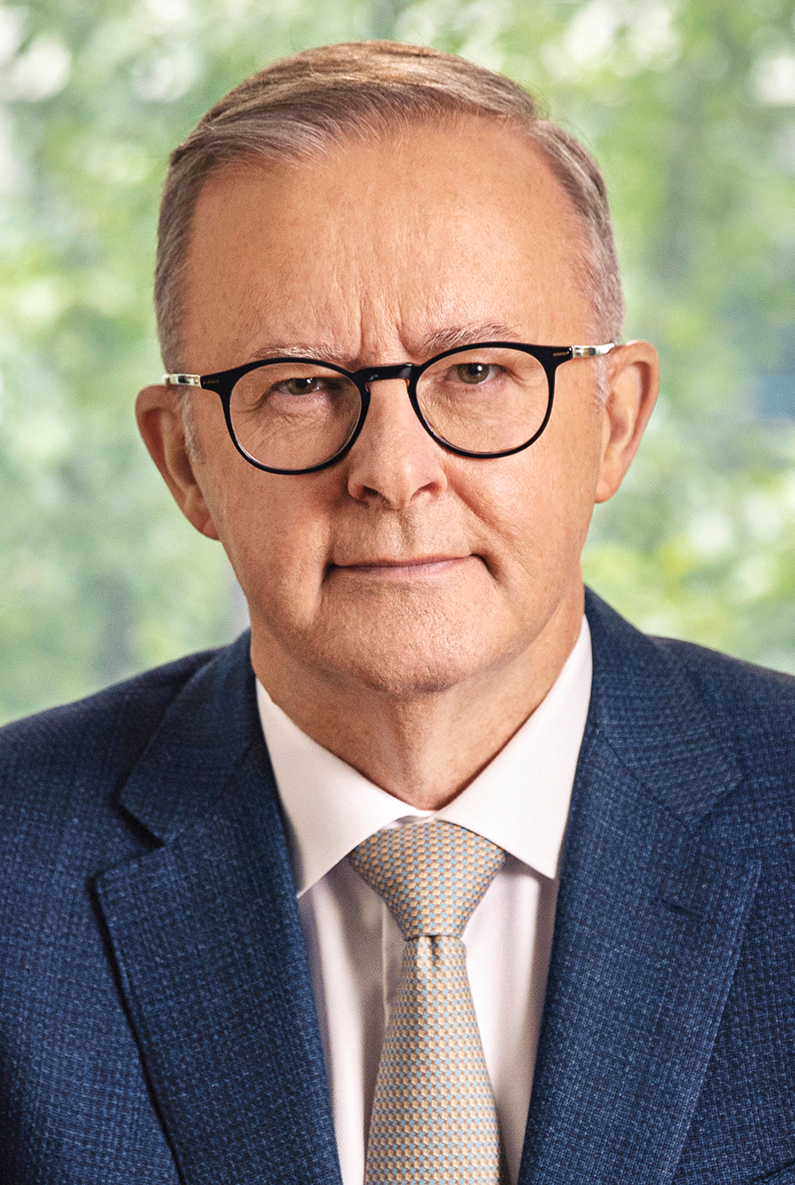

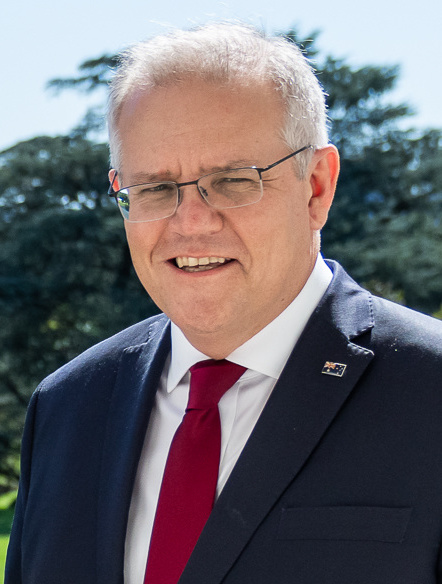
	First party	Second party
Leader	Anthony Albanese	Scott Morrison
Party	Labor	Coalition
Last election	2 seats	0 seats
Seats won	2	0
Seat change	Steady	Steady
Popular vote	38,522	29,664
Percentage	38.16%	29.39%
Swing	▼4.11	▼8.13
TPP	55.54%	44.46%
TPP swing	▲1.34	▼1.34
- Results by division for the House of Representatives, shaded by winning party's margin of victory.

House of Representatives (IRV) – Turnout 73.08% (CV)
Party	Votes	%	Swing (pp)	Seats	Change (seats)
Australian Labor Party	38,522	38.16	−4.11	2	Steady
Country Liberal Party	29,664	29.39	−8.13	0	Steady
Australian Greens	13,182	13.06	+2.91	0	Steady
Liberal Democratic Party	7,787	7.71	+7.71	0	Steady
Pauline Hanson's One Nation	5,418	5.37	+5.37	0	Steady
United Australia Party	4,510	4.47	+1.62	0	Steady
Australian Citizens Party	497	0.49	+0.49	0	Steady
Independent	1,357	1.34	−3.30	0	Steady
Total	100,937	100.00		2	Steady
Invalid/blank votes	5,658	5.31	+0.62	–	–
Turnout	106,595	73.08	–4.86	–	–
Registered voters	145,851	–	–	–	–
Two-party-preferred vote
Labor	56,065	55.54	+1.34	–	–
Liberal	44,872	44.46	–1.34	–	–
Source: AEC for both votes and seats

== Two party preferred preference flow ==
House of Representatives (IRV – Turnout 89.82% (CV)
Party	Coalition			Labor		
Party	Votes	%	±	Votes	%	±
Greens	257,566	14.34%	–3.45	1,538,419	85.66%	+3.45
One Nation	467,768	64.30%	–0.92	259,696	35.70%	+0.92
United Australia Party	373,988	61.86%	–3.36	230,548	38.14%	+3.36
Liberal Democratic Party	181,659	71.81%	–5.43	71,304	28.19%	+5.43
Animal Justice Party	31,736	36.29%	–2.13	55,715	63.71%	+2.13
Australian Federation Party	32,466	56.41%	—	25,089	43.59%	—
Katter's Australian	34,251	61.31%	–5.73	21,612	38.69%	+5.73
Centre Alliance	14,513	39.76%	+6.86	21,987	60.24%	–6.86
Western Australia Party	14,741	44.32%	–4.56	18,522	55.68%	+4.56
The Great Australian Party	15,891	52.29%	–0.78	14,501	47.71%	+0.78
Victorian Socialists	4,507	16.55%	+4.14	22,719	83.45%	–4.14
Informed Medical Options Party	13,896	53.76%	+17.37	11,954	46.24%	–17.37
Jacqui Lambie Network	9,709	40.91%	–	14,021	59.09%	–
Australian Christians	15,175	76.38%	–4.41	4,692	23.62%	+4.41
Shooters, Fishers and Farmers Party	10,798	58.61%	–0.45	7,624	41.39%	+0.45
Fusion	4,091	30.72%	–1.82	9,228	69.28%	+1.82
Socialist Alliance	3,035	25.35%	+5.05	8,936	74.65%	–5.05
Indigenous-Aboriginal Party of Australia	3,495	47.71%	–	3,831	52.29%	–
Derryn Hinch's Justice Party	3,128	48.17%	+1.93	3,366	51.83%	–1.93
TNL	2,268	35.82%	–	4,063	64.18%	–
Legalise Cannabis	2,574	42.72%	–	3,451	57.28%	–
Australian Values Party	3,076	54.71%	–	2,546	45.29%	–
Australian Citizens Party	2,171	44.43%	+18.01	2,715	55.57%	–18.01
Local Party	997	23.44%	–	3,257	76.56%	–
Sustainable Australia	1,351	34.95%	–11.06	2,515	65.05%	+11.06
Drew Pavlou Democratic Alliance	940	42.44%	–	1,275	57.56%	–
Reason Party	281	19.27%	–11.94	1,177	80.73%	+11.94
Australian Progressives	251	23.61%	–9.16	812	76.39%	+9.16
Australian Democrats	222	34.10%	+3.15	429	65.90%	–3.15
Independents	281,211	36.23%	–4.37	494,958	63.77%	+4.37
Total	14,659,042	100.00		151	Steady	
Two-party-preferred vote
Labor		7,642,161	52.13	+3.66		
Liberal/National Coalition		7,016,881	47.87	−3.66		
Invalid/blank votes		802,376	5.19	–0.35	–	–
Turnout		15,461,418	89.82	–2.07	–	–
Registered voters		17,213,433	–	–	–	–
Source: AEC for both votes

== Analysis ==
The vast majority of electorates outside Tasmania swung to Labor. This is especially true for inner-city seats. The vast majority of inner-city seats held by the Liberal Party were won by either Labor, teal independents or the Greens.

Labor notably failed to gain several former bellwether seats, such as the seats of Longman and Petrie in northern Brisbane.

Despite losing the two-party preferred vote both nationally and in every state except Queensland, the Coalition won the first preference vote nationally and in every state except Western Australia and the two territories. Nevertheless, both major parties had swings against them nationally and in all but four states and territories; Labor's vote increased in Queensland, Western Australia and the Australian Capital Territory, while the Liberal Party's vote increased in Tasmania. Tasmania was also the only state that swung to the Coalition on a two-party preferred vote. Outside Tasmania, the Coalition's vote dropped more than Labor's.

The Coalition's losses in seats were limited to the Liberal Party, as the National Party retained all of its seats, despite both Coalition parties having swings against them in the vast majority of seats.

On a two-party preferred basis, few electorates swung to the Coalition outside Victoria and Tasmania. These were the electorates of Calare, Fowler, Gilmore, Lindsay, Page, Parkes, Paterson and Whitlam in New South Wales; Herbert in Queensland; and Lingiari in the Northern Territory.

While teal independents contested a number of Coalition-held seats in every state except Queensland, they were most successful in wealthy inner-city seats, usually held by Moderates, where they were elected on preferences. The seats they gained were all from Liberals: Mackellar, North Sydney and Wentworth in Sydney, Goldstein and Kooyong in Melbourne and Curtin in Perth. These seats are all economically liberal, but environmentally progressive, which has previously seen the Greens finish ahead of Labor in these seats. Furthermore, teals held three other seats before the election (which they subsequently retained): Warringah in Sydney, Clark in Hobart and Indi in regional Victoria. The absence of teal candidates in Queensland may have boosted the Greens vote in inner-city Brisbane, where they won three seats, Brisbane and Ryan from the LNP and Griffith from Labor, which they won in addition to retaining the seat of Melbourne.

=== Swing table ===
State/territory	TPP		
State/territory	ALP	LNP	Swing (to ALP)
Australian Capital Territory	66.95%	33.05%	+5.34
New South Wales	51.42%	48.58%	+3.20
Northern Territory	55.54%	44.46%	+1.34
Queensland	45.95%	54.05%	+4.39
South Australia	53.97%	46.03%	+3.26
Tasmania	54.33%	45.67%	–1.63
Victoria	54.83%	45.17%	+1.64
Western Australia	55.00%	45.00%	+10.55

== Maps ==
=== Results by electoral division ===
First preference vote

Two-candidate-preferred vote

Party holding or gaining each electorate

=== Results by state and territory ===
First preference vote

Two-party-preferred vote

Two-party-preferred swing

=== Results by party ===
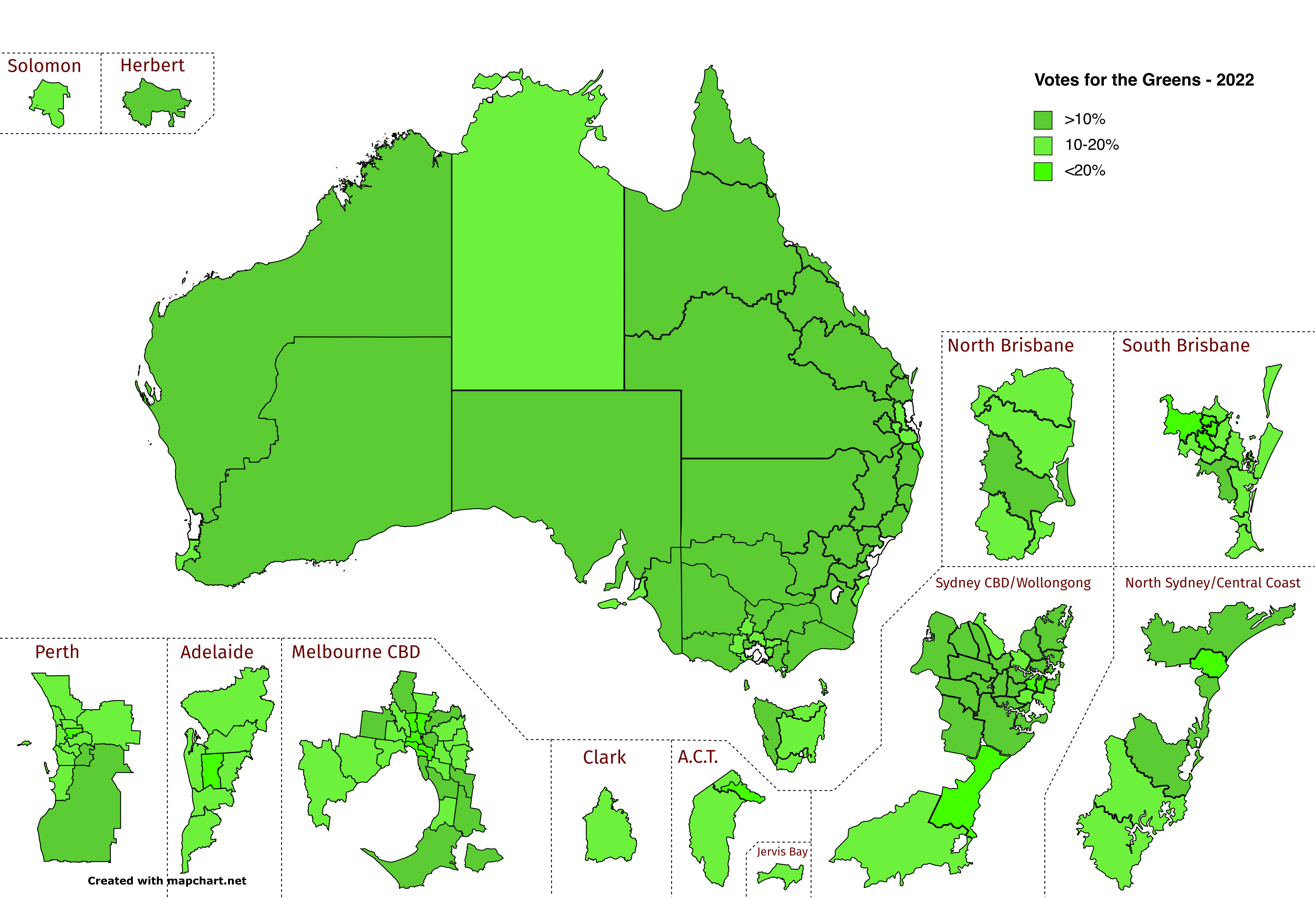
Greens

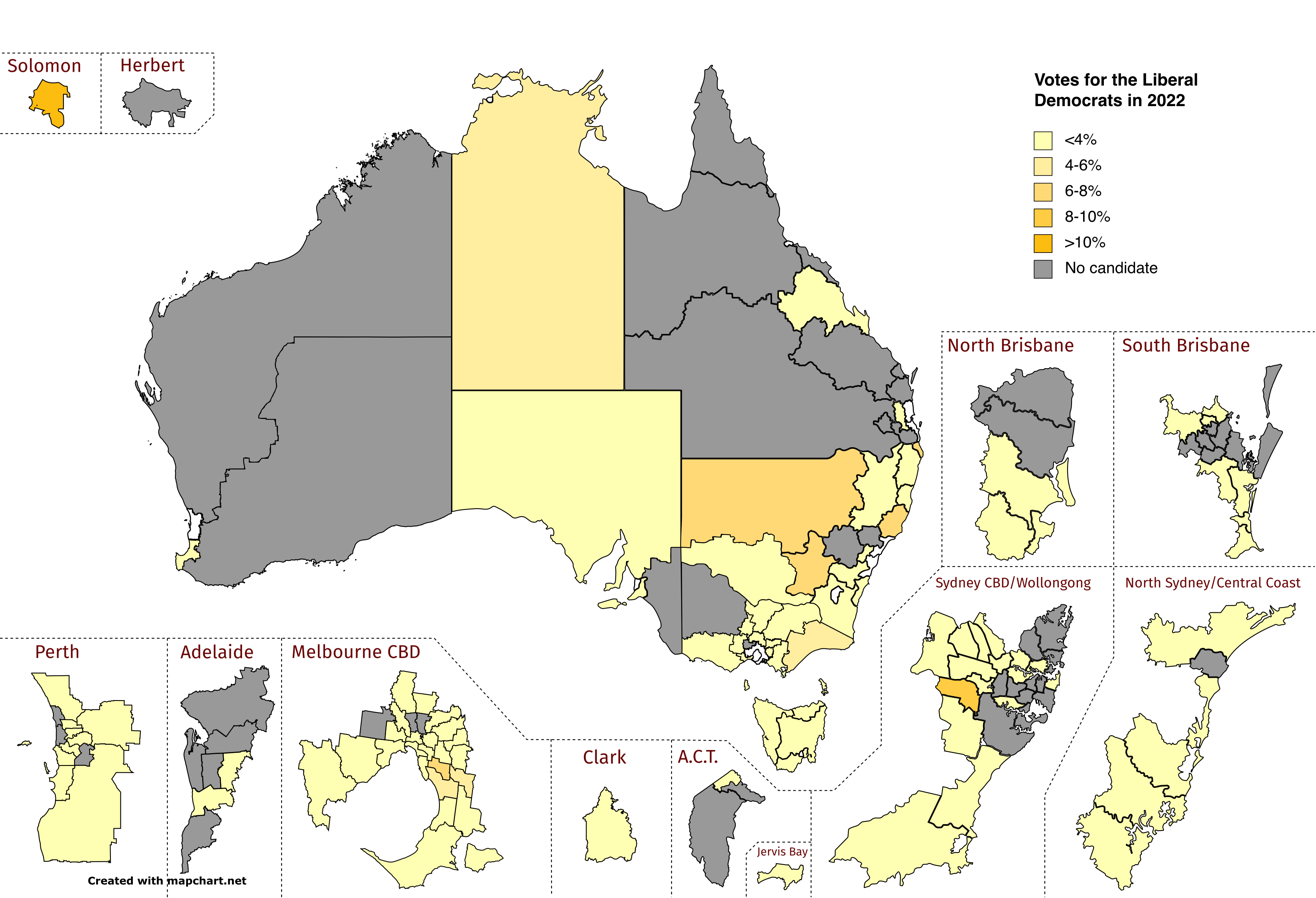
Liberal Democrats

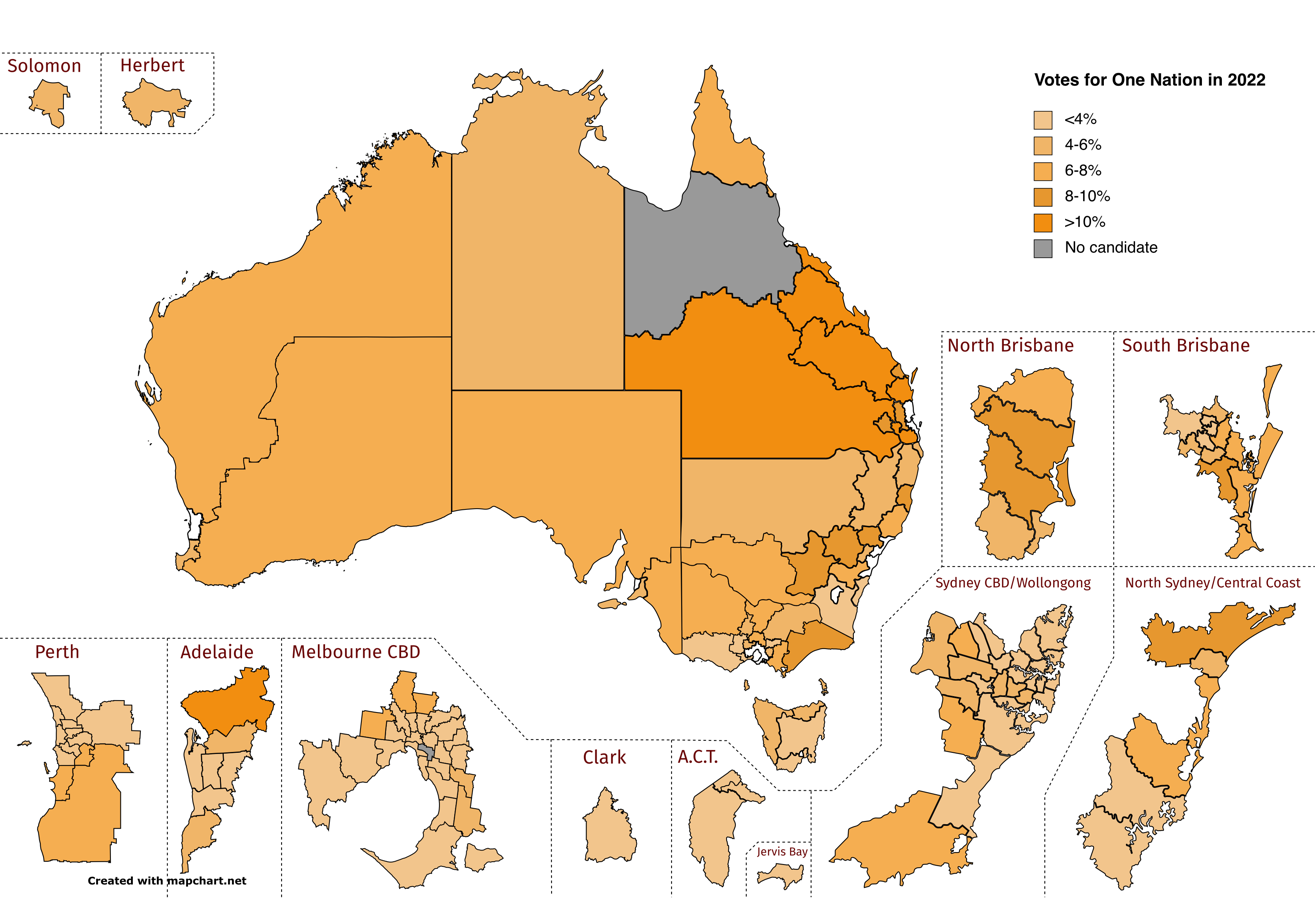
One Nation

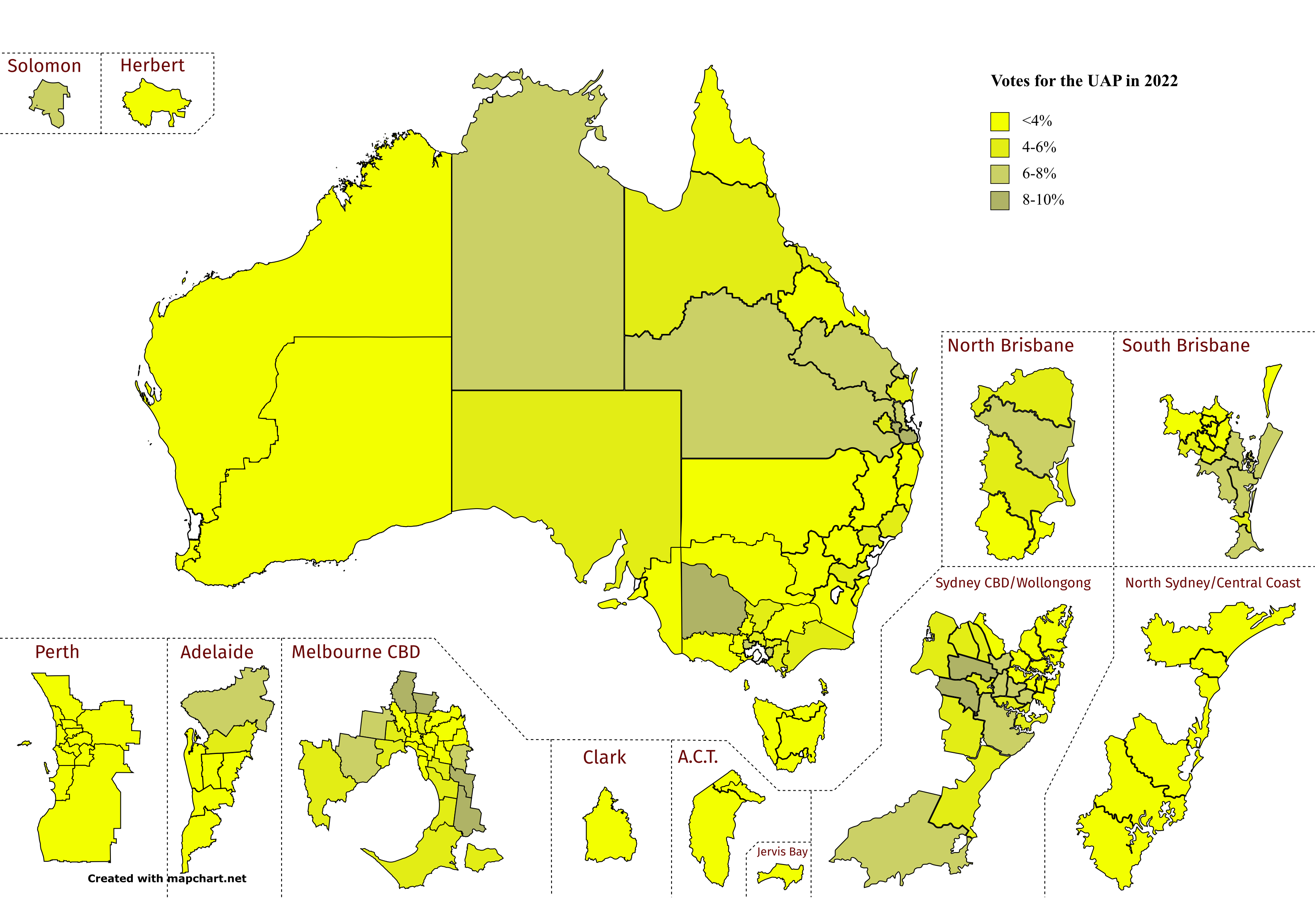
UAP

=== Other maps ===
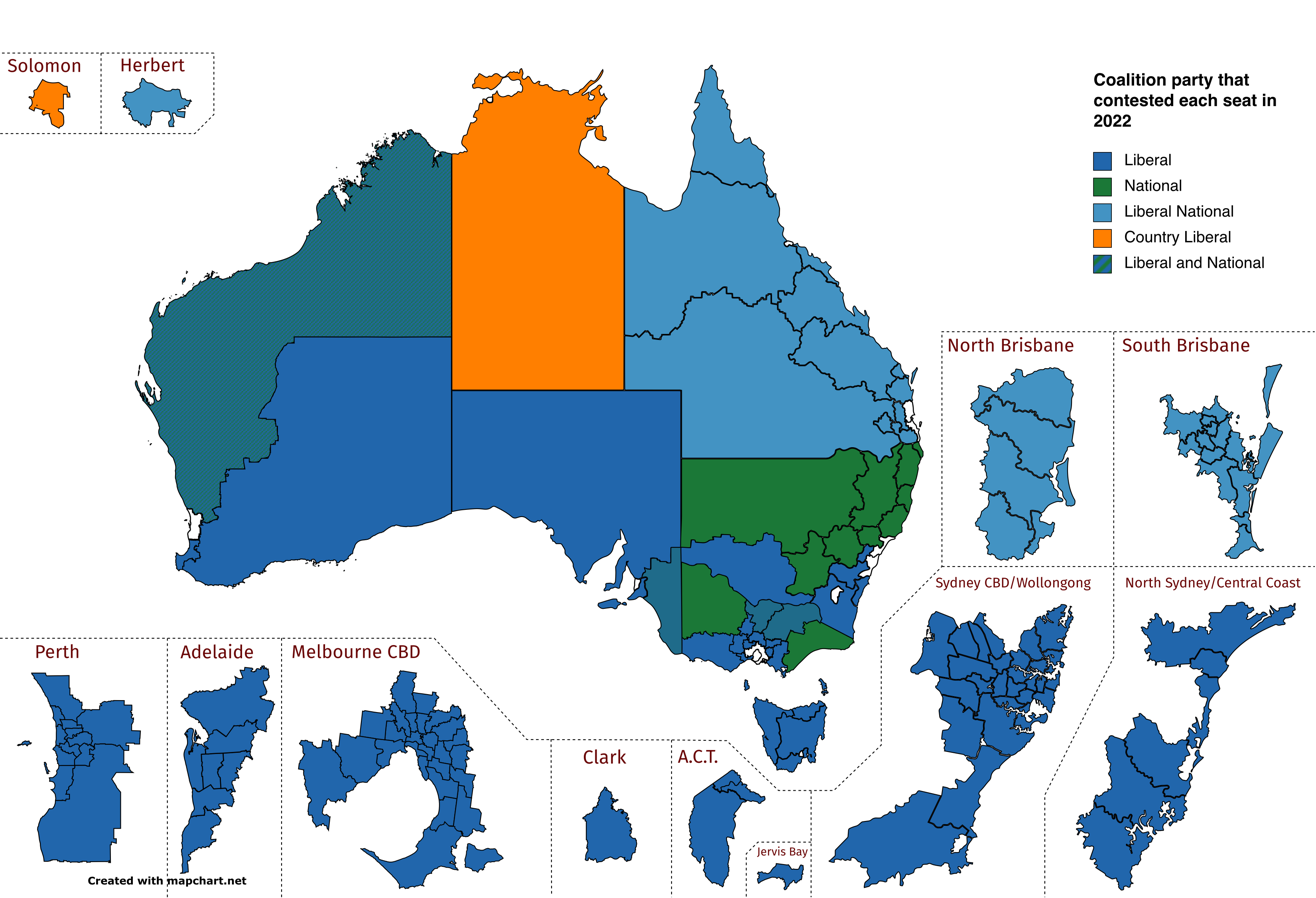
Coalition candidates in each electorate by party

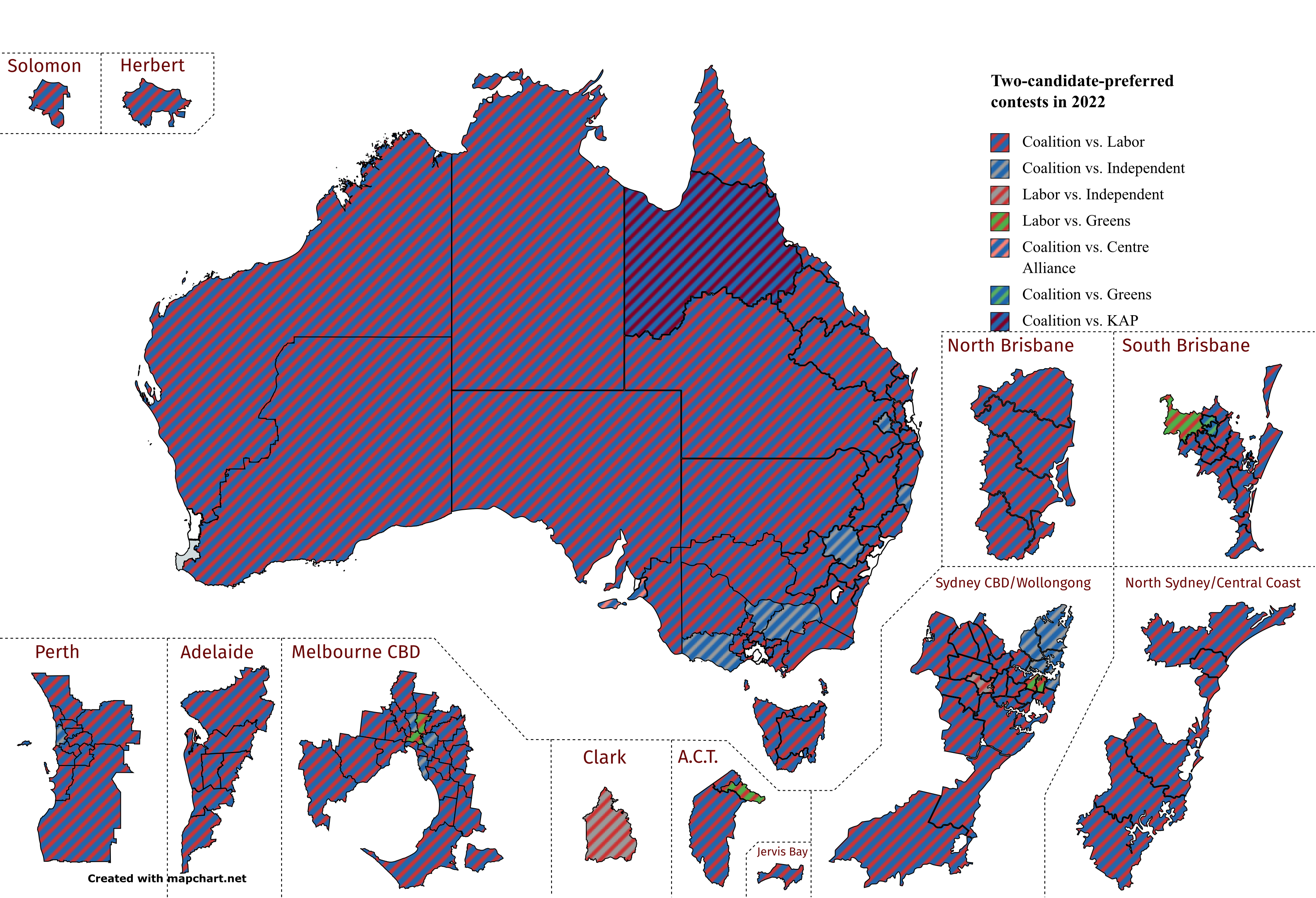
Two-candidate-preferred contests in each electorate
