= Results of the 2022 Australian federal election in Western Australia =

Federal election results in Western Australia

2022 Australian federal election (Western Australia)
← 2019	21 May 2022	2025 →

All 15 Western Australian seats in the Australian House of Representatives and 6 (of 12) Western Australian seats in the Australian Senate
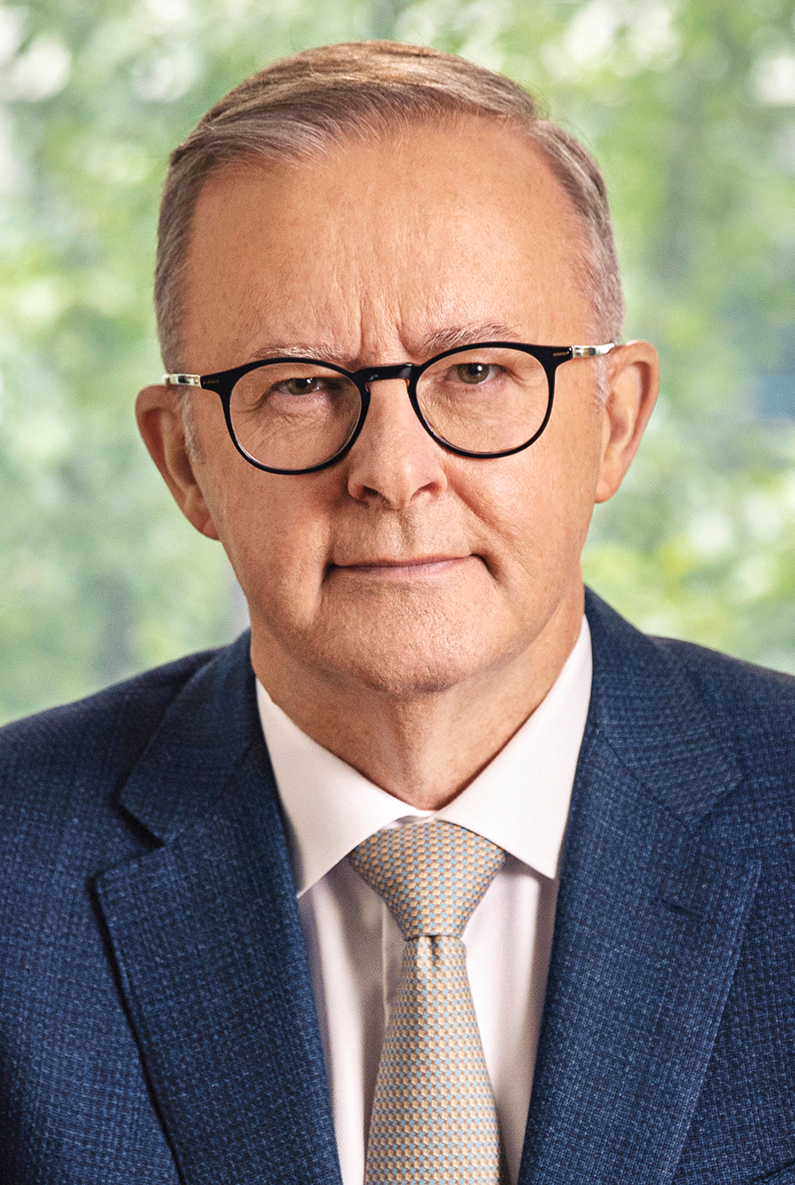

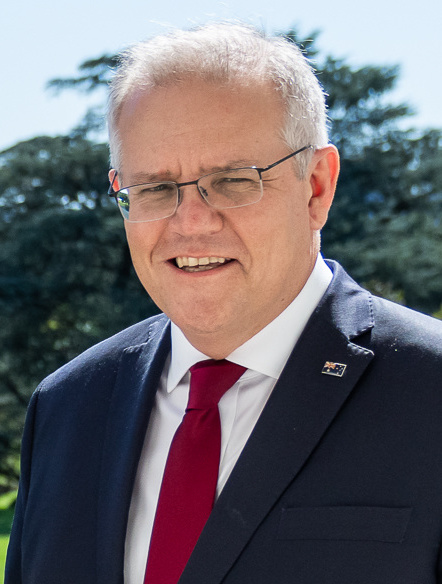
	First party	Second party
Leader	Anthony Albanese	Scott Morrison
Party	Labor	Liberal/National coalition
Last election	5 seats	11 seats
Seats won	9	5
Seat change	▲4	▼6
Popular vote	542,667	512,414
Percentage	36.84%	34.78%
Swing	▲7.04	▼10.44
TPP	55.00%	45.00%
TPP swing	▲10.55	▼10.55
- Results by division for the House of Representatives, shaded by winning party's margin of victory.

The 2022 Australian federal election was held on 21 May 2022 to elect all 151 members of the Australian House of Representatives and 40 of 76 members of the Australian Senate. Of those, 15 MPs and 6 senators were elected to represent the state of Western Australia.

This election was held using Instant-runoff voting. In Western Australia in this election, there were two "turn-overs". In Curtin, an Independent candidate who did not lead in the first count took the seat in the end, and in Tangney, Labor won the seat despite trailing on first preferences. In both of these seats, the Liberals finished first.

== Overall results ==
House of Representatives (IRV) – Turnout 87.99% (CV)
Party	Votes	%	Swing (pp)	Seats	Change (seats)
Australian Labor Party	542,667	36.84	+7.04	9	▲4
Liberal Party of Australia	503,254	34.16	−9.63	5	▼6
National Party of Australia	9,160	0.62	−0.81	0	Steady
Coalition total	512,414	34.78	−10.44	5	▼6
Australian Greens	184,094	12.50	+0.88	0	Steady
Pauline Hanson's One Nation	58,226	3.95	−1.36	0	Steady
United Australia Party	33,863	2.30	+0.27	0	Steady
Western Australia Party	33,263	2.26	+0.46	0	Steady
Australian Christians	19,867	1.35	−0.35	0	Steady
The Great Australian Party	16,553	1.12	+1.06	0	Steady
Australian Federation Party	15,920	1.08	+1.08	0	Steady
Liberal Democratic Party	12,897	0.88	+0.88	0	Steady
Animal Justice Party	5,524	0.37	+0.28	0	Steady
Socialist Alliance	1,184	0.08	+0.01	0	Steady
Informed Medical Options Party	785	0.05	+0.05	0	Steady
Independents	35,968	2.44	+1.34	1	▲1
Total	1,473,225	100.00	–	15	▼1
Invalid/blank votes	86,057	5.52	+0.08	–	–
Turnout	1,559,282	87.99	−2.06	–	–
Registered voters	1,772,065	–	–	–	–
Two-party-preferred vote
Labor	810,206	55.00	+10.55		
Liberal	663,019	45.00	−10.55		
Source: AEC for both votes and seats

== Results by division ==
=== Brand ===
2022 Australian federal election: Brand
Party	Candidate	Votes	%	±%
Labor	Madeleine King	48,031	50.20	+9.82
Liberal	Peter Hudson	21,056	22.01	−7.83
Greens	Heather Lonsdale	10,900	11.39	+0.29
One Nation	Jake Taylor	5,139	5.37	−3.10
United Australia	David Pike	2,711	2.83	−0.06
Western Australia	Michael O'Loghlen	2,592	2.71	+0.01
Christians	Jayne Crichton	2,090	2.18	−0.89
Great Australian	Andrew Gleeson	1,490	1.56	+1.56
Liberal Democrats	Alison Marshall	1,074	1.12	+1.12
Federation	Malcolm Heffernan	598	0.62	+0.62
Total formal votes		95,681	93.59	−0.15
Informal votes		6,551	6.41	+0.15
Turnout		102,232	86.56	−1.90
Two-party-preferred result
Labor	Madeleine King	63,829	66.71	+10.05
Liberal	Peter Hudson	31,852	33.29	−10.05
Labor hold		Swing	+10.05	

Alluvial diagram for preference flows in the seat of Brand in the 2022 federal election. The winning candidate got over 50% of first preference votes, so this alluvial diagram is indicative only, and preference flows were not used to determine the final result. The preference flows were used to determine the two-candidate-preferred.

=== Burt ===
2022 Australian federal election: Burt
Party	Candidate	Votes	%	±%
Labor	Matt Keogh	47,268	51.63	+10.51
Liberal	David Goode	21,009	22.95	−9.49
Greens	Daniel Garlett	9,004	9.84	+0.27
One Nation	Travis Carter	4,436	4.85	−1.25
Christians	Warnar Spyker	3,428	3.74	+0.06
Western Australia	Stephen Phelan	2,390	2.61	+1.40
United Australia	Joshua Mccurry	2,274	2.48	+0.24
Federation	Michele Castle	1,741	1.90	+1.90
Total formal votes		91,550	94.16	+0.82
Informal votes		5,675	5.84	−0.82
Turnout		97,225	86.10	−0.89
Two-party-preferred result
Labor	Matt Keogh	59,704	65.21	+9.71
Liberal	David Goode	31,846	34.79	−9.71
Labor hold		Swing	+9.71	

Alluvial diagram for preference flows in the seat of Burt in the 2022 federal election. The winning candidate got over 50% of first preference votes, so this alluvial diagram is indicative only, and preference flows were not used to determine the final result. The preference flows were used to determine the two-candidate-preferred.

=== Canning ===
2022 Australian federal election: Canning
Party	Candidate	Votes	%	±%
Liberal	Andrew Hastie	41,294	43.81	−5.31
Labor	Amanda Hunt	30,897	32.78	+5.24
Greens	Jodie Moffat	7,659	8.13	+0.64
One Nation	Tammi Siwes	4,215	4.47	−2.63
United Australia	James Waldeck	2,438	2.59	+0.33
Western Australia	Brad Bedford	2,202	2.34	−0.46
Independent	Ashley Williams	1,708	1.81	+1.81
Christians	Andriette du Plessis	1,689	1.79	−0.16
Informed Medical Options	Judith Congrene	785	0.83	+0.83
Liberal Democrats	David Gardiner	749	0.79	+0.79
Federation	Anthony Gardyne	628	0.67	+0.67
Total formal votes		94,264	93.50	−0.43
Informal votes		6,558	6.50	+0.43
Turnout		100,822	87.55	−2.20
Two-party-preferred result
Liberal	Andrew Hastie	50,513	53.59	−7.97
Labor	Amanda Hunt	43,751	46.41	+7.97
Liberal hold		Swing	−7.97	

Alluvial diagram for preference flows in the seat of Canning in the 2022 federal election. indicates at what stage the winning candidate had over 50% of the votes and was declared the winner.

=== Cowan ===
2022 Australian federal election: Cowan
Party	Candidate	Votes	%	±%
Labor	Anne Aly	46,712	46.86	+9.03
Liberal	Vince Connelly	30,328	30.42	−9.65
Greens	Isabella Tripp	9,829	9.86	−1.22
One Nation	Tyler Walsh	2,839	2.85	−1.81
United Australia	Claire Hand	2,423	2.43	+0.18
Christians	Sylvia Iradukunda	1,859	1.86	+0.03
Animal Justice	Michael Anagno	1,775	1.78	+1.78
Western Australia	Roland Laverack	1,714	1.72	+0.52
Federation	Michael Calautti	1,125	1.13	+1.13
Liberal Democrats	Micah van Krieken	1,080	1.08	+1.08
Total formal votes		99,684	92.54	−1.70
Informal votes		8,039	7.46	+1.70
Turnout		107,723	87.86	−2.83
Two-party-preferred result
Labor	Anne Aly	60,625	60.82	+9.96
Liberal	Vince Connelly	39,059	39.18	−9.96
Labor hold		Swing	+9.96	

Alluvial diagram for preference flows in the seat of Cowan in the 2022 federal election. indicates at what stage the winning candidate had over 50% of the votes and was declared the winner.

=== Curtin ===
2022 Australian federal election: Curtin
Party	Candidate	Votes	%	±%
Liberal	Celia Hammond	43,408	41.33	−12.68
Independent	Kate Chaney	30,942	29.46	+29.46
Labor	Yannick Spencer	14,654	13.95	−4.63
Greens	Cameron Pidgeon	10,889	10.37	−4.93
United Australia	Ladeisha Verhoeff	1,828	1.74	+0.45
One Nation	Dale Grillo	1,310	1.25	−0.11
Western Australia	Bill Burn	1,243	1.18	−0.37
Federation	Judith Cullity	763	0.73	+0.73
Total formal votes		105,037	96.89	+0.07
Informal votes		3,373	3.11	−0.07
Turnout		108,410	90.90	−1.10
Notional two-party-preferred count
Liberal	Celia Hammond	58,401	55.60	−8.35
Labor	Yannick Spencer	46,636	44.40	+8.35
Two-candidate-preferred result
Independent	Kate Chaney	53,847	51.26	+51.26
Liberal	Celia Hammond	51,190	48.74	−15.21
Independent gain from Liberal				

Alluvial diagram for preference flows in the seat of Curtin in the 2022 federal election. indicates at what stage the winning candidate had over 50% of the votes and was declared the winner.

=== Durack ===
2022 Australian federal election: Durack
Party	Candidate	Votes	%	±%
Liberal	Melissa Price	30,736	34.33	−10.24
Labor	Jeremiah Riley	26,093	29.15	+6.45
National	Ian Blayney	9,160	10.23	+2.50
Greens	Bianca McNeair	8,457	9.45	+1.42
One Nation	Brenton Johannsen	6,174	6.90	−2.73
Great Australian	Adrian Mcrae	2,738	3.06	+3.06
Western Australia	Anthony Fels	2,483	2.77	−0.52
United Australia	Andrew Middleton	2,229	2.49	−0.23
Federation	Craig Shore	1,453	1.62	+1.62
Total formal votes		89,523	93.50	−1.12
Informal votes		6,219	6.50	+1.12
Turnout		95,742	80.86	−4.49
Two-party-preferred result
Liberal	Melissa Price	48,583	54.27	−9.22
Labor	Jeremiah Riley	40,940	45.73	+9.22
Liberal hold		Swing	−9.22	

Alluvial diagram for preference flows in the seat of Durack in the 2022 federal election. indicates at what stage the winning candidate had over 50% of the votes and was declared the winner.

=== Forrest ===
2022 Australian federal election: Forrest
Party	Candidate	Votes	%	±%
Liberal	Nola Marino	41,006	43.12	−9.36
Labor	Bronwen English	26,092	27.44	+6.29
Greens	Christine Terrantroy	12,780	13.44	+0.60
One Nation	Shane Mezger	5,020	5.28	−0.67
Great Australian	Tracy Aitken	2,907	3.06	+3.06
United Australia	Helen Allan	2,426	2.55	+0.82
Western Australia	Greg Stephens	2,130	2.24	+0.95
Liberal Democrats	Paul Markham	1,577	1.66	+1.66
Federation	Mailee Dunn	1,152	1.21	+1.21
Total formal votes		95,090	94.78	+0.42
Informal votes		5,234	5.22	−0.42
Turnout		100,324	88.78	−2.36
Two-party-preferred result
Liberal	Nola Marino	51,625	54.29	−10.29
Labor	Bronwen English	43,465	45.71	+10.29
Liberal hold		Swing	−10.29	

Alluvial diagram for preference flows in the seat of Forrest in the 2022 federal election. indicates at what stage the winning candidate had over 50% of the votes and was declared the winner.

=== Fremantle ===
2022 Australian federal election: Fremantle
Party	Candidate	Votes	%	±%
Labor	Josh Wilson	43,111	43.97	+5.95
Liberal	Bill Koul	23,749	24.22	−10.75
Greens	Felicity Townsend	17,790	18.14	+2.14
One Nation	William Edgar	3,060	3.12	−0.71
Great Australian	Ben Tilbury	2,293	2.34	+2.34
Western Australia	Janetia Knapp	2,248	2.29	−0.27
United Australia	Stella Jinman	2,000	2.04	+0.10
Federation	Cathy Gavranich	1,367	1.39	+1.39
Liberal Democrats	Yan Loh	1,251	1.28	+1.28
Socialist Alliance	Sam Wainwright	1,184	1.21	+0.12
Total formal votes		98,053	94.21	−0.39
Informal votes		6,025	5.79	+0.39
Turnout		104,078	89.12	−2.11
Two-party-preferred result
Labor	Josh Wilson	65,585	66.89	+9.97
Liberal	Bill Koul	32,468	33.11	−9.97
Labor hold		Swing	+9.97	

Alluvial diagram for preference flows in the seat of Fremantle in the 2022 federal election. indicates at what stage the winning candidate had over 50% of the votes and was declared the winner.

=== Hasluck ===
2022 Australian federal election: Hasluck
Party	Candidate	Votes	%	±%
Labor	Tania Lawrence	39,144	39.73	+9.41
Liberal	Ken Wyatt	32,889	33.39	−10.59
Greens	Brendan Sturcke	10,826	10.99	+0.24
One Nation	Ian Monck	3,783	3.84	−2.29
Independent	Jeanene Williams	3,318	3.37	+3.37
United Australia	Will Scott	2,973	3.02	+0.79
Western Australia	Pauline Clark	2,561	2.60	+1.00
Federation	Marijanna Smith	1,739	1.77	+1.77
Liberal Democrats	Steven McCreanor	1,280	1.30	+1.30
Total formal votes		98,513	94.46	+0.16
Informal votes		5,782	5.54	−0.16
Turnout		104,295	88.74	−0.50
Two-party-preferred result
Labor	Tania Lawrence	55,166	56.00	+11.89
Liberal	Ken Wyatt	43,347	44.00	−11.89
Labor gain from Liberal		Swing	+11.89	

Alluvial diagram for preference flows in the seat of Hasluck in the 2022 federal election. indicates at what stage the winning candidate had over 50% of the votes and was declared the winner.

=== Moore ===
2022 Australian federal election: Moore
Party	Candidate	Votes	%	±%
Liberal	Ian Goodenough	43,706	41.81	−9.69
Labor	Tom French	34,227	32.74	+7.99
Greens	Mark Cooper	14,902	14.26	+2.20
One Nation	Brian Brightman	3,541	3.39	−1.06
Western Australia	Peter Gunness	3,095	2.96	+1.32
United Australia	Helen Watkinson	2,342	2.24	+0.48
Great Australian	Sue Andersson	1,926	1.84	+1.84
Federation	Martin Suter	792	0.76	+0.76
Total formal votes		104,531	95.83	+0.69
Informal votes		4,545	4.17	−0.69
Turnout		109,076	91.43	−1.90
Two-party-preferred result
Liberal	Ian Goodenough	52,958	50.66	−10.96
Labor	Tom French	51,573	49.34	+10.96
Liberal hold		Swing	−10.96	

Alluvial diagram for preference flows in the seat of Moore in the 2022 federal election. indicates at what stage the winning candidate had over 50% of the votes and was declared the winner.

=== O'Connor ===
2022 Australian federal election: O'Connor
Party	Candidate	Votes	%	±%
Liberal	Rick Wilson	43,295	44.76	+2.23
Labor	Shaneane Weldon	25,754	26.63	+6.01
Greens	Giz Watson	10,284	10.63	+2.47
One Nation	Stan Kustrin	6,833	7.06	−1.41
Christians	Justin Moseley	2,779	2.87	+0.22
Western Australia	Morris Bessant	2,366	2.45	+0.87
Great Australian	Brenden Barber	2,337	2.42	+1.50
United Australia	Tracy Tirronen	1,722	1.78	−0.10
Federation	Isaac Middle	1,348	1.39	+1.39
Total formal votes		96,718	94.25	+0.43
Informal votes		5,906	5.75	−0.43
Turnout		102,624	87.12	−4.70
Two-party-preferred result
Liberal	Rick Wilson	55,104	56.97	−8.44
Labor	Shaneane Weldon	41,614	43.03	+8.44
Liberal hold		Swing	−8.44	

Alluvial diagram for preference flows in the seat of O'Connor in the 2022 federal election. indicates at what stage the winning candidate had over 50% of the votes and was declared the winner.

=== Pearce ===
2022 Australian federal election: Pearce
Party	Candidate	Votes	%	±%
Labor	Tracey Roberts	40,596	42.77	+11.04
Liberal	Linda Aitken	28,380	29.90	−13.47
Greens	Donna Nelson	10,416	10.97	+1.22
One Nation	Aaron Malloy	4,295	4.53	−2.30
United Australia	Trevor Dalby	2,534	2.67	+0.05
Western Australia	Jim Paice	2,206	2.32	+1.57
Great Australian	Roslyn Stewart	2,160	2.28	+2.28
Christians	Vanessa Montgomery	2,097	2.21	+0.29
Liberal Democrats	David Marshall	1,548	1.63	+1.63
Federation	Nigel March	684	0.72	+0.72
Total formal votes		94,916	93.77	−0.22
Informal votes		6,306	6.23	+0.22
Turnout		101,222	87.86	−0.55
Two-party-preferred result
Labor	Tracey Roberts	56,040	59.04	+14.23
Liberal	Linda Aitken	38,876	40.96	−14.23
Labor gain from Liberal		Swing	+14.23	

Alluvial diagram for preference flows in the seat of Pearce in the 2022 federal election. indicates at what stage the winning candidate had over 50% of the votes and was declared the winner.

=== Perth ===
2022 Australian federal election: Perth
Party	Candidate	Votes	%	±%
Labor	Patrick Gorman	40,066	39.25	+5.66
Liberal	David Dwyer	27,294	26.74	−12.24
Greens	Caroline Perks	22,621	22.16	+3.79
One Nation	Cameron Bailey	2,749	2.69	−0.03
Western Australia	Dave Vos	1,878	1.84	−0.57
United Australia	Sonya Eberhart	1,605	1.57	−0.23
Animal Justice	Sarah Szmekura-Moor	1,535	1.50	+1.50
Christians	Dean Powell	1,514	1.48	+1.09
Liberal Democrats	Evan Nickols	1,407	1.38	+1.38
Federation	Aiden Gyuru	710	0.70	+0.70
Great Australian	Sean Connor	702	0.69	+0.69
Total formal votes		102,081	94.42	−1.20
Informal votes		6,028	5.58	+1.20
Turnout		108,109	88.19	−1.34
Two-party-preferred result
Labor	Patrick Gorman	66,151	64.80	+11.57
Liberal	David Dwyer	35,930	35.20	−11.57
Labor hold		Swing	+11.57	

Alluvial diagram for preference flows in the seat of Perth in the 2022 federal election. indicates at what stage the winning candidate had over 50% of the votes and was declared the winner.

=== Swan ===
2022 Australian federal election: Swan
Party	Candidate	Votes	%	±%
Labor	Zaneta Mascarenhas	39,082	39.07	+6.17
Liberal	Kristy McSweeney	32,096	32.08	−12.65
Greens	Clint Uink	14,861	14.86	+2.86
United Australia	Paul Hilton	2,637	2.64	+0.81
One Nation	Peter Hallifax	2,544	2.54	−0.33
Animal Justice	Timothy Green	2,214	2.21	+0.89
Western Australia	Rod Bradley	2,059	2.06	+0.70
Christians	Dena Gower	1,930	1.93	+0.20
Liberal Democrats	Matthew Thompson	1,821	1.82	+1.82
Federation	Carl Pallier	792	0.79	+0.79
Total formal votes		100,036	94.75	+0.59
Informal votes		5,545	5.25	−0.59
Turnout		105,581	87.12	−1.73
Two-party-preferred result
Labor	Zaneta Mascarenhas	58,796	58.77	+11.99
Liberal	Kristy McSweeney	41,240	41.23	−11.99
Labor gain from Liberal		Swing	+11.99	

Alluvial diagram for preference flows in the seat of Swan in the 2022 federal election. indicates at what stage the winning candidate had over 50% of the votes and was declared the winner.

=== Tangney ===
2022 Australian federal election: Tangney
Party	Candidate	Votes	%	±%
Liberal	Ben Morton	43,008	39.99	−11.32
Labor	Sam Lim	40,940	38.07	+10.12
Greens	Adam Abdul Razak	12,876	11.97	+1.09
Christians	Mark Staer	2,481	2.31	+0.05
One Nation	Tshung-Hui Chang	2,288	2.13	−0.28
Western Australia	Jay Dean Gillett	2,096	1.95	+0.73
United Australia	Travis Llewellyn Mark	1,721	1.60	+0.28
Liberal Democrats	Jacqueline Holroyd	1,110	1.03	+1.03
Federation	Brent Fowler	1,028	0.96	+0.96
Total formal votes		107,548	96.18	+0.78
Informal votes		4,271	3.82	−0.78
Turnout		111,819	91.51	−1.99
Two-party-preferred result
Labor	Sam Lim	56,331	52.38	+11.88
Liberal	Ben Morton	51,217	47.62	−11.88
Labor gain from Liberal		Swing	+11.88	

Alluvial diagram for preference flows in the seat of Tangney in the 2022 federal election. indicates at what stage the winning candidate had over 50% of the votes and was declared the winner.

== Analysis ==
In this election, the Australian Labor Party led by Anthony Albanese took 4 House seats from the opposing Liberal Party of Australia, thereby gaining the majority of Western Australia's lower house seats for the first time since 1990. The Liberals under Scott Morrison lost a total of 6 seats, including all but 2 of its seats in the Perth metropolitan area.

The results in Western Australia were the subject of significant media attention on election night, as the swing towards Labor in the state was much higher than every other state and territory at 10.55%, and the swing was large enough to deliver a Labor majority government. Labor not only picked up all three seats that they targeted in their campaign—namely Pearce, Swan and Hasluck—but also won the formerly safe Liberal seat of Tangney in one of the biggest upsets of the election. In addition to the seats won by Labor, the Division of Curtin was won by teal independent candidate Kate Chaney, while Stirling was lost due to abolition. Vince Connelly, Stirling's final MP, attempted to transfer to the Division of Cowan, but was unsuccessful.

Labor's two party preferred result in Western Australia of 55.00% is its best performance, tied with its result (also 55.00% in Western Australia) in its 1983 landslide election win.
