= The Great Australian Party =

Australian political party

Great Australian Party
- Abbreviation: GAP
- Leader: Rod Culleton
- Founded: 2018; 8 years ago
- Registered: 7 April 2019
- Split from: One Nation
- Political position: Far-right
- Colors: Blue
- House of Representatives: 0 / 151
- Senate: 0 / 76

Website
- www.greataustralianparty.com.au

The Great Australian Party (GAP) is a far-right political party in Australia. The party was formally registered by the Australian Electoral Commission (AEC) on 7 April 2019 and is associated with former senator Rod Culleton who had been elected in the 2016 Australian federal election as a senator for Western Australia, but subsequently found to have been ineligible and was disqualified.

== Policies and philosophy ==
Policies of the party include the abolition of personal income tax, nationalisation of the Commonwealth Bank and abolition of the Family Court of Australia.

The party also proposes to implement trials by jury only in criminal matters, naming of young criminals who are serial offenders and the restoration of the "true" Constitution of Australia.

Culleton has on numerous occasions declared the Australian Constitution is invalid and thus so are Australian courts. However in 2018 in complete contradiction whilst representing himself in recent bankruptcy proceedings being heard in the Federal Court of Australia, Culleton commenced his opening address by confirming the authority of the Federal Court of Australia by stating: "This Honourable Court has the power delegated to it by the Parliament of the Commonwealth under S 39B(1A) (b) and (c) Judiciary Act 1903 and by S 34AB (c) Acts Interpretation Act 1901..."

The party further proposes a policy that criminal offenders would have sale of their property used as a possible deterrent.

== History ==
Culleton continued to refer to himself as a "senator-in-exile" and sought to appeal his disqualification to the Judicial Committee of the Privy Council in the United Kingdom; appeals to it from Australian courts had (for all practical purposes) been abolished by the Australia Act of 1986.

=== 2019 election ===
In 2018, Culleton initiated the process to establish a new political party, The Great Australian Party, to stand candidates for the Senate at the 2019 Australian federal election. The AEC registered the party on 7 April 2019. The party fielded two Senate candidates in each of New South Wales, Queensland, South Australia, Victoria and Western Australia but did not gain a seat in parliament. The Party's national first preference vote in the Senate was 0.23% (34,199 votes), ranging from 1.16% (12,698 votes) in South Australia to 0.14% (5,194 votes) in Victoria, while in Culleton's home state of Western Australia it received 0.22% (3,196 votes), less than two hundredths of the votes required for election.

On 24 April 2019, the AEC referred Culleton's Senate nomination form to the Australian Federal Police "to examine if a false declaration has been made under provisions of the Criminal Code Act 1995, relating to his status as an undischarged bankrupt and the prima facie disqualification of such persons to be chosen or to sit as a Senator or Member of the House of Representatives under section 44(iii) of the Constitution". The AEC stated that, while it did not have power to reject a fully completed nomination form or to make its own assessment of a candidate's eligibility, it had been aware from a High Court judgment that Culleton had been a declared bankrupt and, upon checking the National Personal Insolvency Index, had found that he was currently listed as an undischarged bankrupt.

In May 2019, the AEC determined that Culleton's Party was eligible for public funding, despite a bankrupt being "incapable of being chosen" as a member of Parliament. The AEC also stated they did not have the power to decide if a candidate is ineligible.

On 8 May 2019, a group of intoxicated Great Australian Party supporters campaigning outside a polling booth in Cockburn, WA verbally abused a 70 year old woman and her husband. One of the group of approximately eight Great Australian Party supporters, wearing a high-visibility vest displaying a Great Australian Party logo, was observed being drunk and aggressive and taunting voters to fight him. Police were required to attend to intervene. In a later statement, Culleton denied the supporters were registered with the Party. This contradicts the reported statements of bystanders, voters and members of other parties who had observed Great Australian Party supporters spruiking AEC approved materials and wearing high-visibility vests displaying Great Australian Party logos.

=== Wayne Glew ===
The Party's other Senate candidate in Western Australia at the 2019 election was Wayne Glew, a former police officer who is a "self-proclaimed expert of the constitution". Glew has been a claimant, defendant or appellant in at least 16 Court proceedings in which he has argued against the validity of the Australian Constitution. Glew has not been successful in a single proceeding to date. This resulted in Glew being declared a vexatious litigant by the Supreme Court of Western Australia and being prevented from initiating any further Court proceedings in Western Australia.

On 23 December 2011, Glew was convicted in the Geraldton Magistrates' Court of one offence of assaulting a public officer and one offence of obstructing an officer in the execution of his duty.

Glew provided legal advice to Heather Glendinning, who killed herself and her two daughters in a murder–suicide in 2011. He subsequently told The West Australian that she had been murdered, and that "I spent 17 years in the police and you can make anything look like anything". In 2012, Glew was ordered to pay $2 million in damages to an investor in his fuel vaporiser system. The Supreme Court found that his invention "offered no benefit over existing fuel systems" and that he had engaged in "deceptive and misleading conduct".

=== 2022 election ===
On 12 February 2021, Culleton announced that controversial former celebrity chef Pete Evans had joined the party and would be the candidate for the Senate in New South Wales at the next federal election. By October, however, Evans had pulled out. In the 2022 federal election, the party received 0.55% of Senate first preference votes across Australia.
