= Electoral results for the Division of Tangney =

Australian division election results

This is a list of electoral results for the Division of Tangney in Australian federal elections from the division's creation in 1974 until the present.

== Members ==
| Member | Party | Term |
|---|---|---|
| John Dawkins | Labor | 1974–1975 |
| Peter Richardson | Liberal | 1975–1977 |
| Peter Richardson | Progress | 1977–1977 |
| Peter Shack | Liberal | 1977–1983 |
| George Gear | Labor | 1983–1984 |
| Peter Shack | Liberal | 1984–1993 |
| Daryl Williams | Liberal | 1993–2004 |
| Dennis Jensen | Liberal | 2004–2016 |
| Dennis Jensen | Independent | 2016 |
| Ben Morton | Liberal | 2016–2022 |
| Sam Lim | Labor | 2022–present |

== Election results ==
=== Elections in the 2020s ===
==== 2025 ====
2025 Australian federal election: Tangney
| Party | Candidate | Votes | % | ±% |
|---|---|---|---|---|
| Greens | Eric Hayward | | | |
| Liberal | Howard Ong | | | |
| Legalise Cannabis | Phillip Raymond Leslie | | | |
| One Nation | Steve Kefalinos | | | |
| Labor | Sam Lim | | | |
| Christians | James Rai | | | |
| Total formal votes | | | | |
| Informal votes | | | | |
| Turnout | | | | |

==== 2022 ====
2022 Australian federal election: Tangney
| Party | Candidate | Votes | % | ±% |
|---|---|---|---|---|
| Liberal | Ben Morton | 43,008 | 39.99 | −11.32 |
| Labor | Sam Lim | 40,940 | 38.07 | +10.12 |
| Greens | Adam Abdul Razak | 12,876 | 11.97 | +1.09 |
| Christians | Mark Staer | 2,481 | 2.31 | +0.05 |
| One Nation | Tshung-Hui Chang | 2,288 | 2.13 | −0.28 |
| Western Australia | Jay Dean Gillett | 2,096 | 1.95 | +0.73 |
| United Australia | Travis Llewellyn Mark | 1,721 | 1.60 | +0.28 |
| Liberal Democrats | Jacqueline Holroyd | 1,110 | 1.03 | +1.03 |
| Federation | Brent Fowler | 1,028 | 0.96 | +0.96 |
| Total formal votes | | 107,548 | 96.18 | +0.78 |
| Informal votes | | 4,271 | 3.82 | −0.78 |
| Turnout | | 111,819 | 91.51 | −1.99 |
Two-party-preferred result
| Labor | Sam Lim | 56,331 | 52.38 | +11.88 |
| Liberal | Ben Morton | 51,217 | 47.62 | −11.88 |
| Labor gain from Liberal | | Swing | +11.88 | |

Alluvial diagram for preference flows in the seat of Tangney in the 2022 federal election. indicates at what stage the winning candidate had over 50% of the votes and was declared the winner.

=== Elections in the 2010s ===
==== 2019 ====
2019 Australian federal election: Tangney
| Party | Candidate | Votes | % | ±% |
|---|---|---|---|---|
| Liberal | Ben Morton | 44,740 | 53.63 | +4.82 |
| Labor | Marion Boswell | 21,644 | 25.95 | +2.40 |
| Greens | Martin Spencer | 9,319 | 11.17 | −1.22 |
| Independent | Jillian Horton | 1,933 | 2.32 | +2.32 |
| One Nation | Scott Rafferty | 1,732 | 2.08 | +2.08 |
| Christians | Mark Staer | 1,695 | 2.03 | −1.34 |
| Western Australia | Gavin Waugh | 1,080 | 1.29 | +1.29 |
| United Australia | Chris Fernandez | 969 | 1.16 | +1.16 |
| Independent | Paul Waddy | 307 | 0.37 | +0.37 |
| Total formal votes | | 83,419 | 95.61 | −1.84 |
| Informal votes | | 3,831 | 4.39 | +1.84 |
| Turnout | | 87,250 | 92.47 | +1.27 |
Two-party-preferred result
| Liberal | Ben Morton | 51,275 | 61.47 | +0.40 |
| Labor | Marion Boswell | 32,144 | 38.53 | −0.40 |
| Liberal hold | | Swing | +0.40 | |

==== 2016 ====
2016 Australian federal election: Tangney
| Party | Candidate | Votes | % | ±% |
|---|---|---|---|---|
| Liberal | Ben Morton | 40,790 | 48.81 | −6.95 |
| Labor | Marion Boswell | 19,679 | 23.55 | −1.82 |
| Greens | Thor Kerr | 10,353 | 12.39 | +1.40 |
| Independent | Dennis Jensen | 9,924 | 11.88 | +11.88 |
| Christians | John Wieske | 2,819 | 3.37 | +0.98 |
| Total formal votes | | 83,565 | 97.45 | +1.74 |
| Informal votes | | 2,183 | 2.55 | −1.74 |
| Turnout | | 85,748 | 91.20 | −5.95 |
Two-party-preferred result
| Liberal | Ben Morton | 51,029 | 61.07 | −1.95 |
| Labor | Marion Boswell | 32,536 | 38.93 | +1.95 |
| Liberal hold | | Swing | −1.95 | |

==== 2013 ====
2013 Australian federal election: Tangney
| Party | Candidate | Votes | % | ±% |
|---|---|---|---|---|
| Liberal | Dennis Jensen | 48,752 | 57.17 | +1.48 |
| Labor | Luke Willis | 20,744 | 24.33 | −1.47 |
| Greens | Peter Best | 8,882 | 10.42 | −3.07 |
| Palmer United | Wayne Driver | 3,738 | 4.38 | +4.38 |
| Christians | John Wieske | 2,236 | 2.62 | +2.62 |
| Rise Up Australia | Stephen Carson | 922 | 1.08 | +1.08 |
| Total formal votes | | 85,274 | 95.83 | −0.69 |
| Informal votes | | 3,707 | 4.17 | +0.69 |
| Turnout | | 88,981 | 93.81 | −0.41 |
Two-party-preferred result
| Liberal | Dennis Jensen | 55,144 | 64.67 | +2.35 |
| Labor | Luke Willis | 30,130 | 35.33 | −2.35 |
| Liberal hold | | Swing | +2.35 | |

==== 2010 ====
2010 Australian federal election: Tangney
| Party | Candidate | Votes | % | ±% |
|---|---|---|---|---|
| Liberal | Dennis Jensen | 46,712 | 55.69 | +3.31 |
| Labor | David Doepel | 21,637 | 25.80 | −5.73 |
| Greens | Peter Best | 11,311 | 13.49 | +5.20 |
| Christian Democrats | Ka-ren Chew | 2,814 | 3.36 | +1.01 |
| Family First | Moyna Rapp | 1,399 | 1.67 | +0.53 |
| Total formal votes | | 83,873 | 96.52 | −0.83 |
| Informal votes | | 3,028 | 3.48 | +0.83 |
| Turnout | | 86,901 | 94.28 | −0.80 |
Two-party-preferred result
| Liberal | Dennis Jensen | 52,266 | 62.32 | +2.51 |
| Labor | David Doepel | 31,607 | 37.68 | −2.51 |
| Liberal hold | | Swing | +2.51 | |

=== Elections in the 2000s ===
==== 2007 ====
2007 Australian federal election: Tangney
| Party | Candidate | Votes | % | ±% |
|---|---|---|---|---|
| Liberal | Dennis Jensen | 39,406 | 50.85 | −2.87 |
| Labor | Mark Reynolds | 24,832 | 32.04 | +3.50 |
| Greens | Christine Ivan | 6,896 | 8.90 | +1.10 |
| Independent | Katherine Jackson | 3,070 | 3.96 | +3.96 |
| Christian Democrats | Ka-ren Chew | 1,867 | 2.41 | −0.37 |
| Family First | Lisa Saladine | 815 | 1.05 | +1.05 |
| One Nation | Lloyd Boon | 613 | 0.79 | −1.66 |
| Total formal votes | | 77,499 | 97.27 | +1.71 |
| Informal votes | | 2,178 | 2.73 | −1.71 |
| Turnout | | 79,677 | 94.56 | +0.65 |
Two-party-preferred result
| Liberal | Dennis Jensen | 45,480 | 58.68 | −3.07 |
| Labor | Mark Reynolds | 32,019 | 41.32 | +3.07 |
| Liberal hold | | Swing | −3.07 | |

==== 2004 ====
2004 Australian federal election: Tangney
| Party | Candidate | Votes | % | ±% |
|---|---|---|---|---|
| Liberal | Dennis Jensen | 40,061 | 53.72 | +3.91 |
| Labor | Gavin Waugh | 21,288 | 28.54 | −3.29 |
| Greens | Andrew Duckett | 5,814 | 7.80 | +2.77 |
| Christian Democrats | Colleen Tapley | 2,075 | 2.78 | +1.24 |
| Independent | Wilson Wu | 1,870 | 2.51 | +2.51 |
| One Nation | Lloyd Boon | 1,828 | 2.45 | −0.94 |
| Democrats | Andrew Ingram | 1,440 | 1.93 | −3.38 |
| Citizens Electoral Council | Neil Vincent | 204 | 0.27 | +0.27 |
| Total formal votes | | 74,580 | 95.56 | −0.40 |
| Informal votes | | 3,468 | 4.44 | +0.40 |
| Turnout | | 78,048 | 93.91 | −1.52 |
Two-party-preferred result
| Liberal | Dennis Jensen | 46,050 | 61.75 | +3.78 |
| Labor | Gavin Waugh | 28,530 | 38.25 | −3.78 |
| Liberal hold | | Swing | +3.78 | |

==== 2001 ====
2001 Australian federal election: Tangney
| Party | Candidate | Votes | % | ±% |
|---|---|---|---|---|
| Liberal | Daryl Williams | 37,847 | 49.81 | +1.46 |
| Labor | Sam Gowegati | 24,181 | 31.83 | −0.32 |
| Democrats | Andrew Ingram | 4,033 | 5.31 | −0.28 |
| Greens | Ben Stanwix | 3,820 | 5.03 | +0.23 |
| One Nation | Aaron Lumsdaine | 2,576 | 3.39 | −3.61 |
| Independent | Gordon Graham | 1,231 | 1.62 | +1.62 |
| Christian Democrats | Craig Watson | 1,171 | 1.54 | −0.14 |
| Liberals for Forests | Michael Lucas | 1,122 | 1.48 | +1.48 |
| Total formal votes | | 75,981 | 95.96 | −0.93 |
| Informal votes | | 3,200 | 4.04 | +0.93 |
| Turnout | | 79,181 | 95.75 | |
Two-party-preferred result
| Liberal | Daryl Williams | 44,047 | 57.97 | +0.93 |
| Labor | Sam Gowegati | 31,934 | 42.03 | −0.93 |
| Liberal hold | | Swing | +0.93 | |

=== Elections in the 1990s ===
==== 1998 ====
1998 Australian federal election: Tangney
| Party | Candidate | Votes | % | ±% |
|---|---|---|---|---|
| Liberal | Daryl Williams | 36,547 | 47.31 | −7.62 |
| Labor | Martin Whitely | 25,521 | 33.04 | +2.18 |
| One Nation | Raymond O'Dwyer | 5,564 | 7.20 | +7.20 |
| Democrats | Geoff Taylor | 4,350 | 5.63 | −2.95 |
| Greens | Joshua Byrne | 3,542 | 4.58 | −0.35 |
| Christian Democrats | Suryan Chandrasegaran | 1,484 | 1.92 | +1.92 |
| Abolish Child Support | Manny Goldberg | 246 | 0.32 | +0.32 |
| Total formal votes | | 77,254 | 96.74 | −0.34 |
| Informal votes | | 2,601 | 3.26 | +0.34 |
| Turnout | | 79,855 | 95.70 | −0.31 |
Two-party-preferred result
| Liberal | Daryl Williams | 43,184 | 55.90 | −5.96 |
| Labor | Martin Whitely | 34,070 | 44.10 | +5.96 |
| Liberal hold | | Swing | −5.96 | |

==== 1996 ====
1996 Australian federal election: Tangney
| Party | Candidate | Votes | % | ±% |
|---|---|---|---|---|
| Liberal | Daryl Williams | 37,759 | 55.45 | −1.58 |
| Labor | Dermot Buckley | 20,426 | 29.99 | −1.59 |
| Democrats | Ilse Trewin | 6,090 | 8.94 | +5.35 |
| Greens | Margaret Jenkins | 3,454 | 5.07 | −0.76 |
| Natural Law | Ken Barrett | 372 | 0.55 | +0.10 |
| Total formal votes | | 68,101 | 97.06 | −0.92 |
| Informal votes | | 2,063 | 2.94 | +0.92 |
| Turnout | | 70,164 | 96.01 | −0.52 |
Two-party-preferred result
| Liberal | Daryl Williams | 42,050 | 62.13 | +0.27 |
| Labor | Dermot Buckley | 25,630 | 37.87 | −0.27 |
| Liberal hold | | Swing | +0.27 | |

==== 1993 ====
1993 Australian federal election: Tangney
| Party | Candidate | Votes | % | ±% |
|---|---|---|---|---|
| Liberal | Daryl Williams | 38,910 | 57.02 | +2.07 |
| Labor | Jason Jordan | 21,549 | 31.58 | +4.18 |
| Greens | Mark Sundancer | 3,976 | 5.83 | −1.14 |
| Democrats | Don Bryant | 2,449 | 3.59 | −6.01 |
| Call to Australia | John Trenning | 1,048 | 1.54 | +1.54 |
| Natural Law | Ken Barrett | 303 | 0.44 | +0.44 |
| Total formal votes | | 68,235 | 97.98 | +0.76 |
| Informal votes | | 1,406 | 2.02 | −0.76 |
| Turnout | | 69,641 | 96.53 | |
Two-party-preferred result
| Liberal | Daryl Williams | 42,189 | 61.86 | +0.10 |
| Labor | Jason Jordan | 26,016 | 38.14 | −0.10 |
| Liberal hold | | Swing | +0.10 | |

==== 1990 ====
1990 Australian federal election: Tangney
| Party | Candidate | Votes | % | ±% |
|---|---|---|---|---|
| Liberal | Peter Shack | 34,571 | 55.0 | +0.5 |
| Labor | Chris Keely | 17,239 | 27.4 | −9.8 |
| Democrats | Hannah Wolfe | 6,039 | 9.6 | +3.9 |
| Greens | Mark Schneider | 4,386 | 7.0 | +7.0 |
| Grey Power | Andrew Wade | 675 | 1.1 | +1.1 |
| Total formal votes | | 62,910 | 97.2 | |
| Informal votes | | 1,798 | 2.8 | |
| Turnout | | 64,708 | 95.5 | |
Two-party-preferred result
| Liberal | Peter Shack | 38,779 | 61.8 | +2.7 |
| Labor | Chris Keely | 24,019 | 38.2 | −2.7 |
| Liberal hold | | Swing | +2.7 | |

=== Elections in the 1980s ===
==== 1987 ====
1987 Australian federal election: Tangney
| Party | Candidate | Votes | % | ±% |
|---|---|---|---|---|
| Liberal | Peter Shack | 33,520 | 52.9 | −2.4 |
| Labor | Ray Masterton | 24,599 | 38.8 | −1.5 |
| Democrats | Richard Jeffreys | 3,610 | 5.7 | +1.3 |
| National | William Witham | 1,649 | 2.6 | +2.6 |
| Total formal votes | | 63,378 | 94.4 | |
| Informal votes | | 3,738 | 5.6 | |
| Turnout | | 67,116 | 95.4 | |
Two-party-preferred result
| Liberal | Peter Shack | 36,405 | 57.4 | −0.4 |
| Labor | Ray Masterton | 26,962 | 42.5 | +0.4 |
| Liberal hold | | Swing | −0.4 | |

==== 1984 ====
1984 Australian federal election: Tangney
| Party | Candidate | Votes | % | ±% |
|---|---|---|---|---|
| Liberal | Peter Shack | 31,531 | 55.3 | +6.9 |
| Labor | David Dale | 22,978 | 40.3 | −5.7 |
| Democrats | Ron Murray | 2,514 | 4.4 | +0.6 |
| Total formal votes | | 57,023 | 94.1 | |
| Informal votes | | 3,557 | 5.9 | |
| Turnout | | 60,580 | 95.0 | |
Two-party-preferred result
| Liberal | Peter Shack | 32,934 | 57.8 | +7.6 |
| Labor | David Dale | 24,089 | 42.2 | −7.6 |
| Liberal hold | | Swing | +7.6 | |

==== 1983 ====
1983 Australian federal election: Tangney
| Party | Candidate | Votes | % | ±% |
|---|---|---|---|---|
| Labor | George Gear | 34,899 | 49.4 | +9.1 |
| Liberal | Peter Shack | 31,811 | 45.0 | −5.1 |
| Democrats | Ron Murray | 2,706 | 3.8 | −5.9 |
| Socialist Workers | Bronwen Beachey | 1,236 | 1.7 | +1.7 |
| Total formal votes | | 70,652 | 98.2 | |
| Informal votes | | 1,256 | 1.8 | |
| Turnout | | 71,917 | 94.0 | |
Two-party-preferred result
| Labor | George Gear | | 53.2 | +7.8 |
| Liberal | Peter Shack | | 46.8 | −7.8 |
| Labor gain from Liberal | | Swing | +7.8 | |

==== 1980 ====
1980 Australian federal election: Tangney
| Party | Candidate | Votes | % | ±% |
|---|---|---|---|---|
| Liberal | Peter Shack | 32,592 | 50.1 | −0.1 |
| Labor | Maureen Wong | 26,216 | 40.3 | +8.6 |
| Democrats | Robert McCormack | 6,288 | 9.7 | −4.8 |
| Total formal votes | | 65,096 | 97.7 | |
| Informal votes | | 1,549 | 2.3 | |
| Turnout | | 66,645 | 94.3 | |
Two-party-preferred result
| Liberal | Peter Shack | | 54.6 | −5.3 |
| Labor | Maureen Wong | | 45.4 | +5.3 |
| Liberal hold | | Swing | −5.3 | |

=== Elections in the 1970s ===
==== 1977 ====
1977 Australian federal election: Tangney
| Party | Candidate | Votes | % | ±% |
|---|---|---|---|---|
| Liberal | Peter Shack | 32,198 | 48.7 | −7.7 |
| Labor | Duncan Graham | 21,947 | 33.2 | −6.7 |
| Democrats | Geoffrey Taylor | 9,561 | 14.5 | +14.5 |
| Progress | Geoffrey McNeil | 2,361 | 3.6 | −0.2 |
| Total formal votes | | 66,067 | 96.9 | |
| Informal votes | | 2,145 | 3.1 | |
| Turnout | | 68,212 | 95.0 | |
Two-party-preferred result
| Liberal | Peter Shack | | 58.4 | −0.2 |
| Labor | Duncan Graham | | 41.6 | +0.2 |
| Liberal hold | | Swing | −0.2 | |

==== 1975 ====
1975 Australian federal election: Tangney
| Party | Candidate | Votes | % | ±% |
|---|---|---|---|---|
| Liberal | Peter Richardson | 34,677 | 54.4 | +12.8 |
| Labor | John Dawkins | 26,697 | 41.9 | −8.7 |
| Workers | Warwick Agnew | 2,395 | 3.8 | +3.8 |
| Total formal votes | | 63,769 | 97.7 | |
| Informal votes | | 1,508 | 2.3 | |
| Turnout | | 65,277 | 94.8 | |
Two-party-preferred result
| Liberal | Peter Richardson | | 56.6 | +9.7 |
| Labor | John Dawkins | | 43.4 | −9.7 |
| Liberal gain from Labor | | Swing | +9.7 | |

==== 1974 ====
1974 Australian federal election: Tangney
| Party | Candidate | Votes | % | ±% |
|---|---|---|---|---|
| Labor | John Dawkins | 28,176 | 50.6 | |
| Liberal | Peter Whyte | 23,196 | 41.6 | |
| National Alliance | June Bunce | 3,430 | 6.2 | |
| Australia | Wendy Russell-Brown | 900 | 1.6 | |
| Total formal votes | | 55,702 | 97.5 | |
| Informal votes | | 1,419 | 2.5 | |
| Turnout | | 57,121 | 94.9 | |
Two-party-preferred result
| Labor | John Dawkins | | 53.1 | +2.5 |
| Liberal | Peter Whyte | | 46.9 | −2.5 |
| Labor notional hold | | Swing | +2.5 | |
