= Results of the 2016 Australian federal election in Western Australia =

2016 Australian federal election (Western Australia)
← 2013	2 July 2016	2019 →

All 16 Western Australian seats in the Australian House of Representatives and all 12 seats in the Australian Senate
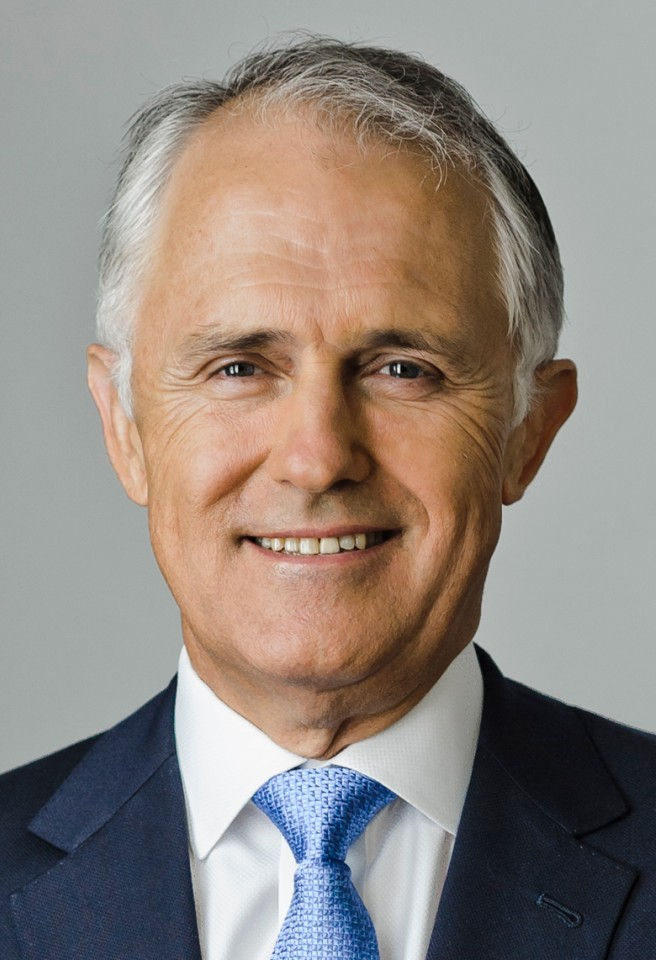

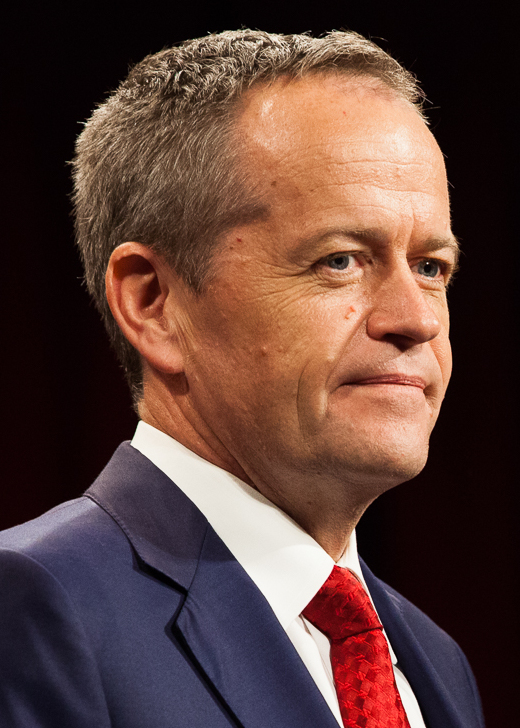
	First party	Second party
Leader	Malcolm Turnbull	Bill Shorten
Party	Liberal/National coalition	Labor
Last election	12 seats	3 seats
Seats won	11 seats	5 seats
Seat change	▼1	▲2
Popular vote	651,765	434,318
Percentage	48.70%	32.45%
Swing	▼1.61	▲3.69
TPP	54.66%	45.34%
TPP swing	▼3.62	▲3.62
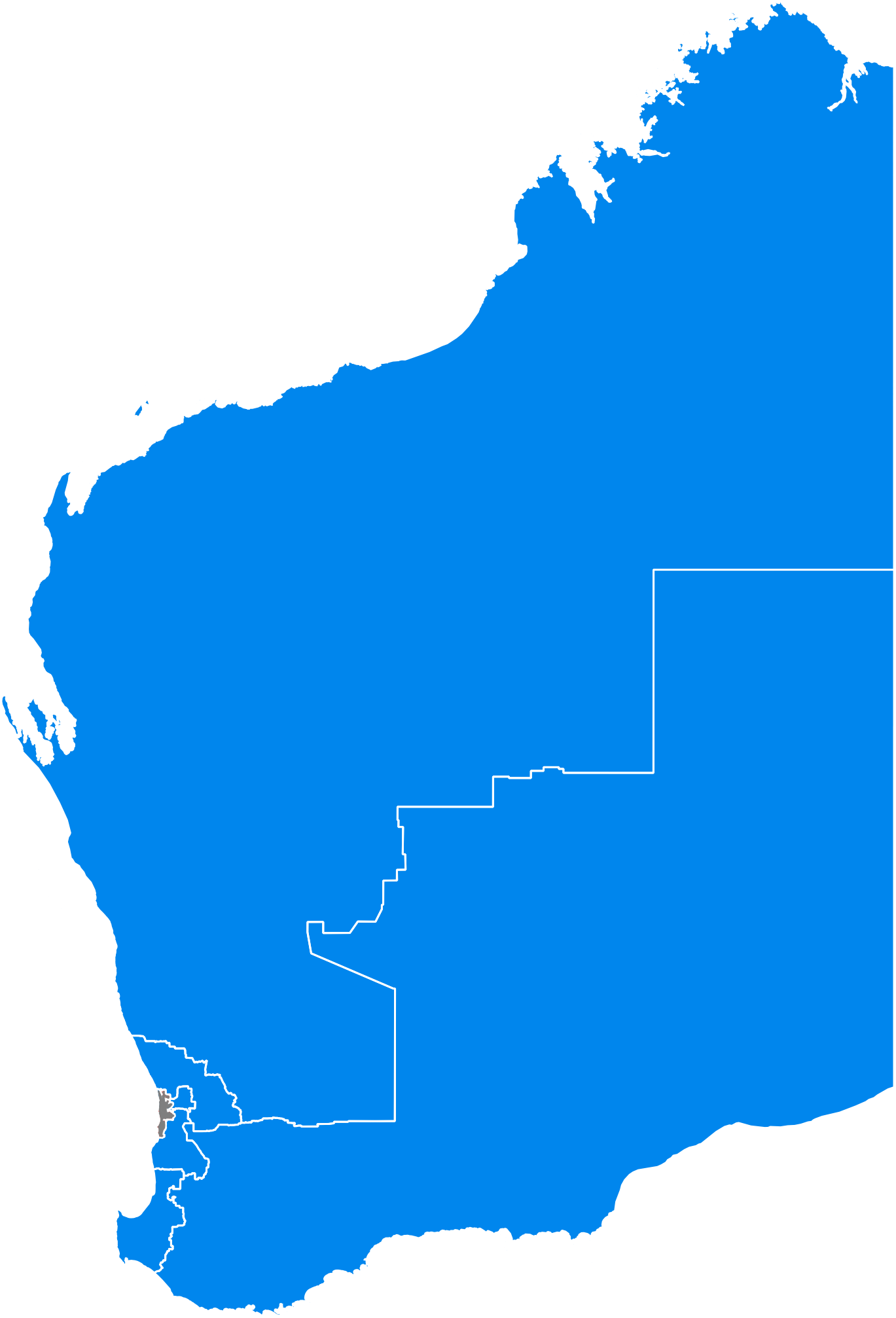
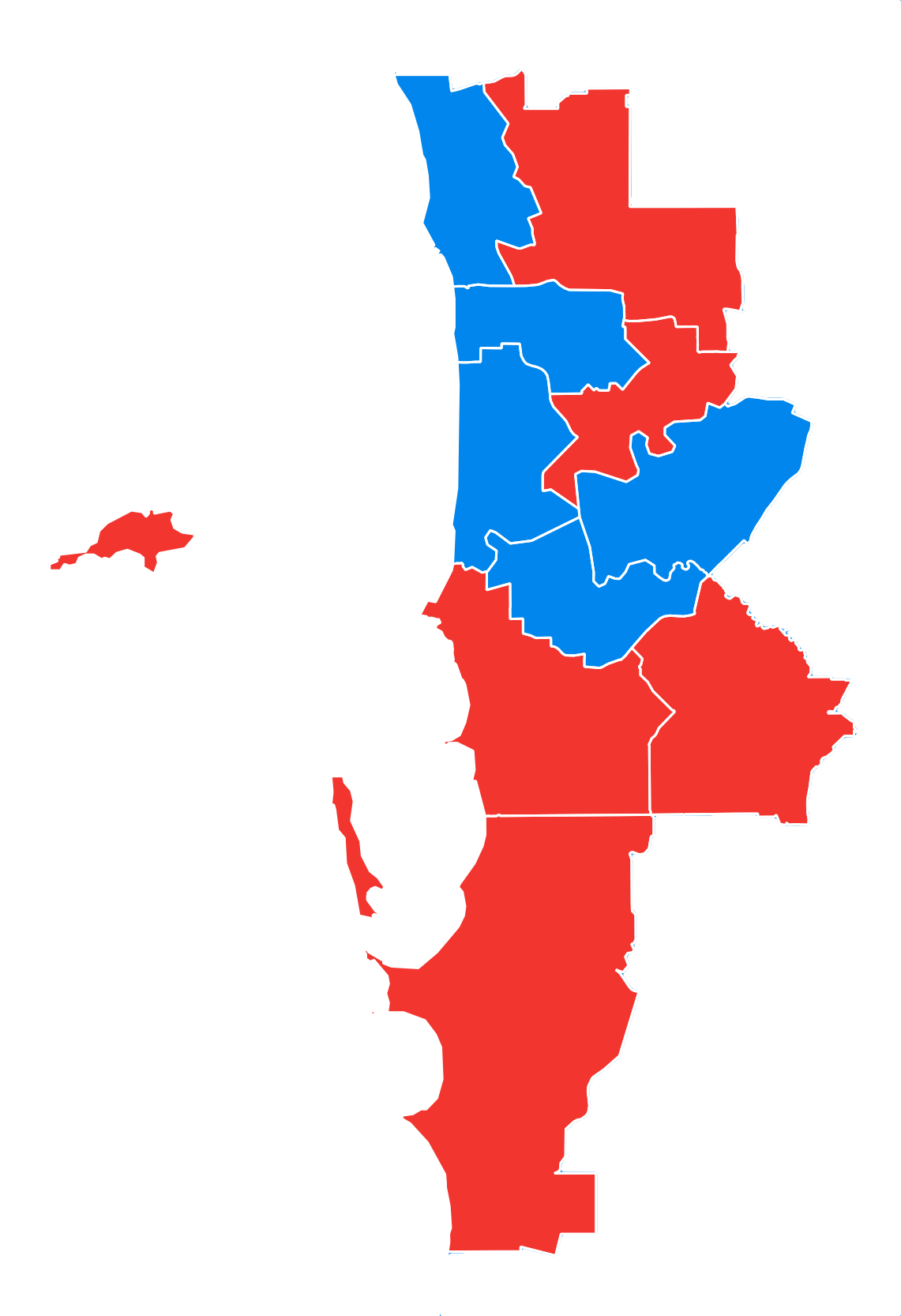

This is a list of electoral division results for the 2016 Australian federal election in the state of Western Australia.

== Overall results ==
Party	Votes	%	Swing	Seats	Change
Liberal Party of Australia	611,605	45.70	–1.61	11	▼1
Australian Labor Party	434,318	32.45	+3.69	5	▲2
Australian Greens	161,443	12.06	+2.32		
National Party of Australia	40,160	3.00	−0.90		
Australian Christians	34,197	2.56	+0.53		
Rise Up Australia Party	20,859	1.56	+0.84		
Shooters, Fishers and Farmers Party	6,022	0.45	+0.45		
Mature Australia Party	3,203	0.24	+0.24		
Liberal Democratic Party	2,526	0.19	+0.19		
Outdoor Recreation Party	2,375	0.18	+0.18		
Australian Liberty Alliance	1,544	0.10	+0.10		
Socialist Alliance	1,404	0.10	+0.04		
Online Direct Democracy	1,300	0.10	+0.10		
Independent	17,381	1.30	+1.03		
Total	1,338,337			16	
Two-party-preferred vote
Liberal Party of Australia	731,497	54.66	−3.62	11	▼1
Australian Labor Party	606,840	45.34	+3.62	5	▲2

Liberal to Labor: Burt, Cowan

== Results by division ==
=== Brand ===
2016 Australian federal election: Brand
Party	Candidate	Votes	%	±%
Labor	Madeleine King	38,803	47.48	+6.39
Liberal	Craig Buchanan	25,843	31.62	−6.12
Greens	Dawn Jecks	9,542	11.68	+4.25
Rise Up Australia	Philip Scott	4,704	5.76	+5.04
Christians	Robert Burdett	2,826	3.46	+1.43
Total formal votes		81,718	95.78	+1.59
Informal votes		3,602	4.22	−1.59
Turnout		85,320	87.04	+1.28
Two-party-preferred result
Labor	Madeleine King	50,202	61.43	+7.72
Liberal	Craig Buchanan	31,516	38.57	−7.72
Labor hold		Swing	+7.72	

=== Burt ===
2016 Australian federal election: Burt
Party	Candidate	Votes	%	±%
Labor	Matt Keogh	39,673	47.03	+15.11
Liberal	Matt O'Sullivan	29,836	35.37	−10.23
Greens	Muhammad Salman	6,770	8.03	+0.28
Christians	Warnar Spyker	4,345	5.15	+1.60
Shooters, Fishers, Farmers	Ian Blevin	3,734	4.43	+4.43
Total formal votes		84,358	95.58	+1.30
Informal votes		3,903	4.42	−1.30
Turnout		88,261	88.73	+1.37
Two-party-preferred result
Labor	Matt Keogh	48,177	57.11	+13.20
Liberal	Matt O'Sullivan	36,181	42.89	−13.20
Labor notional gain from Liberal		Swing	+13.20	

Burt was a new seat, notionally held by the Liberal party.

=== Canning ===
2016 Australian federal election: Canning
Party	Candidate	Votes	%	±%
Liberal	Andrew Hastie	42,497	50.30	−1.53
Labor	Barry Winmar	27,918	33.04	+5.61
Greens	Aeron Blundell-Camden	7,388	8.74	+1.63
National	Jason Turner	3,581	4.24	+2.54
Christians	Janine Vander Ven	3,110	3.68	+1.53
Total formal votes		84,494	95.76	+1.09
Informal votes		3,743	4.24	−1.09
Turnout		88,237	89.22	+2.78
Two-party-preferred result
Liberal	Andrew Hastie	47,987	56.79	−4.56
Labor	Barry Winmar	36,507	43.21	+4.56
Liberal hold		Swing	−4.56	

=== Cowan ===
2016 Australian federal election: Cowan
Party	Candidate	Votes	%	±%
Liberal	Luke Simpkins	34,405	42.22	−4.36
Labor	Anne Aly	33,966	41.68	+6.90
Greens	Sheridan Young	6,193	7.60	−0.18
Christians	Rex Host	2,680	3.29	+0.90
Shooters, Fishers, Farmers	Jamie Chester	2,288	2.81	+2.81
Liberal Democrats	Neil Hamilton	1,096	1.34	+1.34
Mature Australia	Steve Veness	868	1.07	+1.07
Total formal votes		81,496	94.53	+0.09
Informal votes		4,712	5.47	−0.09
Turnout		86,208	89.60	−2.07
Two-party-preferred result
Labor	Anne Aly	41,301	50.68	+5.20
Liberal	Luke Simpkins	40,195	49.32	−5.20
Labor gain from Liberal		Swing	+5.20	

=== Curtin ===
2016 Australian federal election: Curtin
Party	Candidate	Votes	%	±%
Liberal	Julie Bishop	56,175	65.50	+2.99
Labor	Melissa Callanan	13,476	15.71	−1.95
Greens	Viv Glance	12,180	14.20	−0.60
Independent	Sandra Boulter	2,389	2.79	+2.79
Liberty Alliance	David Archibald	1,544	1.80	+1.80
Total formal votes		85,764	97.98	+1.26
Informal votes		1,772	2.02	−1.26
Turnout		87,536	89.75	−3.80
Two-party-preferred result
Liberal	Julie Bishop	60,631	70.70	+2.48
Labor	Melissa Callanan	25,133	29.30	−2.48
Liberal hold		Swing	+2.48	

=== Durack ===
2016 Australian federal election: Durack
Party	Candidate	Votes	%	±%
Liberal	Melissa Price	32,011	41.74	+3.59
Labor	Carol Martin	19,860	25.90	+5.87
National	Lisa Cole	12,257	15.98	−7.42
Greens	Ian James	7,710	10.05	+3.10
Rise Up Australia	Mitchell Sambell	2,885	3.76	+2.69
Christians	Grahame Gould	1,966	2.56	+1.25
Total formal votes		76,689	96.09	+2.49
Informal votes		3,122	3.91	−2.49
Turnout		79,811	82.03	−6.89
Two-party-preferred result
Liberal	Melissa Price	46,823	61.06	+7.08
Labor	Carol Martin	29,866	38.94	+38.94
Liberal hold		Swing	+7.08	

=== Forrest ===
2016 Australian federal election: Forrest
Party	Candidate	Votes	%	±%
Liberal	Nola Marino	41,869	49.44	−1.81
Labor	Lorrae Loud	19,596	23.14	−0.39
Greens	Jill Reading	10,137	11.97	+2.13
National	Luke Pilkington	4,306	5.08	−1.31
Independent	Ross Slater	2,896	3.42	+3.42
Outdoor Recreation	David Fishlock	2,375	2.80	+2.80
Christians	Edward Dabrowski	1,858	2.19	+0.56
Rise Up Australia	Jennifer Whately	1,654	1.95	+1.27
Total formal votes		84,691	94.14	−0.27
Informal votes		5,269	5.86	+0.27
Turnout		89,960	89.72	−0.43
Two-party-preferred result
Liberal	Nola Marino	52,981	62.56	−1.25
Labor	Lorrae Loud	31,710	37.44	+1.25
Liberal hold		Swing	−1.25	

=== Fremantle ===
2016 Australian federal election: Fremantle
Party	Candidate	Votes	%	±%
Labor	Josh Wilson	34,792	40.99	−0.36
Liberal	Pierrette Kelly	31,292	36.87	−0.61
Greens	Kate Davis	15,053	17.74	+5.87
Mature Australia	Mick Connolly	2,335	2.75	+2.75
Socialist Alliance	Chris Jenkins	1,404	1.65	+0.79
Total formal votes		84,876	96.00	+2.51
Informal votes		3,535	4.00	−2.51
Turnout		88,411	88.81	−1.30
Two-party-preferred result
Labor	Josh Wilson	48,821	57.52	+2.12
Liberal	Pierrette Kelly	36,055	42.48	−2.12
Labor hold		Swing	+2.12	

=== Hasluck ===
2016 Australian federal election: Hasluck
Party	Candidate	Votes	%	±%
Liberal	Ken Wyatt	36,519	44.95	−1.18
Labor	Bill Leadbetter	28,652	35.26	+5.78
Greens	Patrick Hyslop	10,283	12.66	+2.35
Rise Up Australia	Henry Barnard	2,999	3.69	+3.34
Christians	Phil Twiss	2,798	3.44	+1.19
Total formal votes		81,251	95.96	+1.53
Informal votes		3,425	4.04	−1.53
Turnout		84,676	88.82	−3.02
Two-party-preferred result
Liberal	Ken Wyatt	42,294	52.05	−3.97
Labor	Bill Leadbetter	38,957	47.95	+3.97
Liberal hold		Swing	−3.97	

=== Moore ===
2016 Australian federal election: Moore
Party	Candidate	Votes	%	±%
Liberal	Ian Goodenough	48,133	54.98	+1.01
Labor	Tony Walker	25,118	28.69	+2.88
Greens	Daniel Lindley	11,100	12.68	+2.81
Christians	Maryka Groenewald	3,194	3.65	+1.85
Total formal votes		87,545	96.80	+1.14
Informal votes		2,891	3.20	−1.14
Turnout		90,436	90.54	−5.06
Two-party-preferred result
Liberal	Ian Goodenough	53,416	61.02	−1.42
Labor	Tony Walker	34,129	38.98	+1.42
Liberal hold		Swing	−1.42	

=== O'Connor ===
2016 Australian federal election: O'Connor
Party	Candidate	Votes	%	±%
Liberal	Rick Wilson	37,092	42.67	+4.21
Labor	Jon Ford	18,190	20.92	+1.40
National	John Hassell	15,936	18.33	−5.53
Greens	Giz Watson	9,013	10.37	+3.58
Christians	Trevor Young	3,496	4.02	+1.54
Rise Up Australia	Stephen Carson	3,207	3.69	+2.96
Total formal votes		86,934	96.19	+2.12
Informal votes		3,439	3.81	−2.12
Turnout		90,373	88.79	−5.21
Two-party-preferred result
Liberal	Rick Wilson	56,543	65.04	+14.09
Labor	Jon Ford	30,391	34.96	+34.96
Liberal hold		Swing	+14.09	

=== Pearce ===
2016 Australian federal election: Pearce
Party	Candidate	Votes	%	±%
Liberal	Christian Porter	39,551	45.44	−1.65
Labor	Thomas French	29,809	34.25	+8.08
Greens	Lee-Anne Miles	9,543	10.96	+1.13
National	Maddison Simmonds	4,080	4.69	+0.14
Rise Up Australia	Taffy Samuriwo-Vuntarde	4,049	4.65	+3.72
Total formal votes		87,032	95.45	+1.18
Informal votes		4,150	4.55	−1.18
Turnout		91,182	87.35	+5.90
Two-party-preferred result
Liberal	Christian Porter	46,672	53.63	−5.68
Labor	Thomas French	40,360	46.37	+5.68
Liberal hold		Swing	−5.68	

=== Perth ===
2016 Australian federal election: Perth
Party	Candidate	Votes	%	±%
Liberal	Jeremy Quinn	35,381	42.31	+0.20
Labor	Tim Hammond	31,248	37.36	−1.02
Greens	Tim Clifford	14,272	17.07	+5.10
Liberal Democrats	Mark Walmsley	1,430	1.71	+1.71
Online Direct Democracy	Andrew Chambers	1,300	1.55	+1.55
Total formal votes		83,631	96.23	+1.12
Informal votes		3,274	3.77	−1.12
Turnout		86,905	88.04	−2.79
Two-party-preferred result
Labor	Tim Hammond	44,602	53.33	+1.15
Liberal	Jeremy Quinn	39,029	46.67	−1.15
Labor hold		Swing	+1.15	

=== Stirling ===
2016 Australian federal election: Stirling
Party	Candidate	Votes	%	±%
Liberal	Michael Keenan	40,991	49.45	−1.27
Labor	Robert Pearson	26,669	32.17	+2.40
Greens	Tom Webster	9,679	11.68	+0.79
Independent	Kim Mubarak	2,172	2.62	+1.63
Christians	Kevin Host	2,019	2.44	+0.34
Rise Up Australia	Alison Rowe	1,361	1.64	+1.05
Total formal votes		82,891	95.85	+1.62
Informal votes		3,587	4.15	−1.62
Turnout		86,478	87.73	−3.57
Two-party-preferred result
Liberal	Michael Keenan	46,520	56.12	−2.85
Labor	Robert Pearson	36,371	43.88	+2.85
Liberal hold		Swing	−2.85	

=== Swan ===
2016 Australian federal election: Swan
Party	Candidate	Votes	%	±%
Liberal	Steve Irons	39,220	48.18	−1.43
Labor	Tammy Solonec	26,869	33.01	+2.97
Greens	Sarah Nielsen-Harvey	12,227	15.02	+3.79
Christians	Steve Klomp	3,086	3.79	+2.06
Total formal votes		81,402	96.37	+1.96
Informal votes		3,062	3.63	−1.96
Turnout		84,464	86.84	−3.55
Two-party-preferred result
Liberal	Steve Irons	43,625	53.59	−3.75
Labor	Tammy Solonec	37,777	46.41	+3.75
Liberal hold		Swing	−3.75	

=== Tangney ===
2016 Australian federal election: Tangney
Party	Candidate	Votes	%	±%
Liberal	Ben Morton	40,790	48.81	−6.95
Labor	Marion Boswell	19,679	23.55	−1.82
Greens	Thor Kerr	10,353	12.39	+1.40
Independent	Dennis Jensen	9,924	11.88	+11.88
Christians	John Wieske	2,819	3.37	+0.98
Total formal votes		83,565	97.45	+1.74
Informal votes		2,183	2.55	−1.74
Turnout		85,748	91.20	−5.95
Two-party-preferred result
Liberal	Ben Morton	51,029	61.07	−1.95
Labor	Marion Boswell	32,536	38.93	+1.95
Liberal hold		Swing	−1.95	
