= Results of the 2013 Australian federal election in Western Australia =

2013 Australian federal election (Western Australia)
← 2010	7 September 2013	2016 →

All 15 West Australian seats in the Australian House of Representatives and 6 (of the 12) seats in the Australian Senate
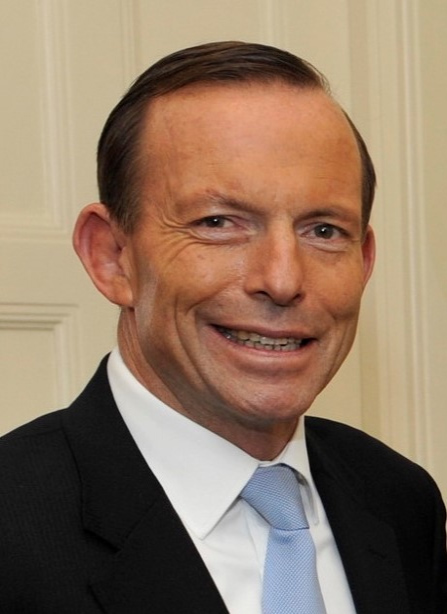

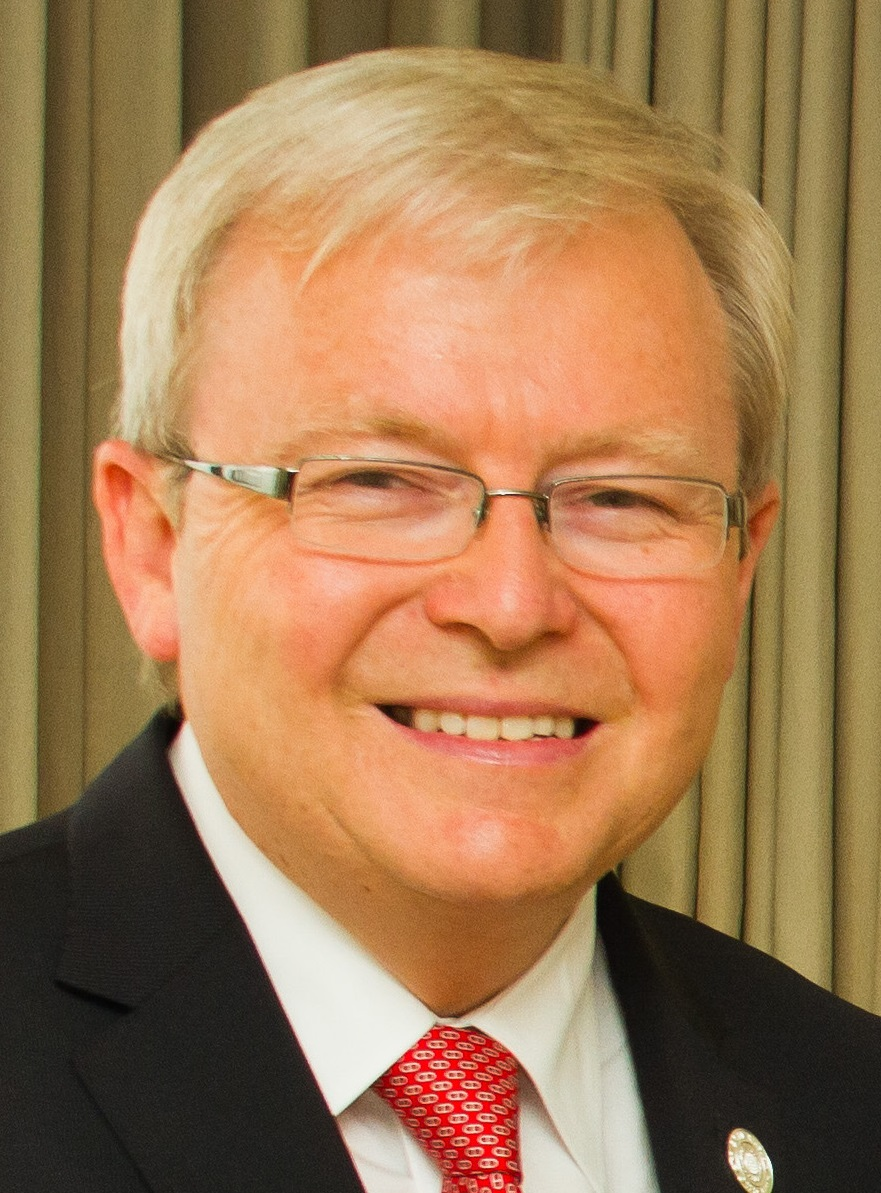

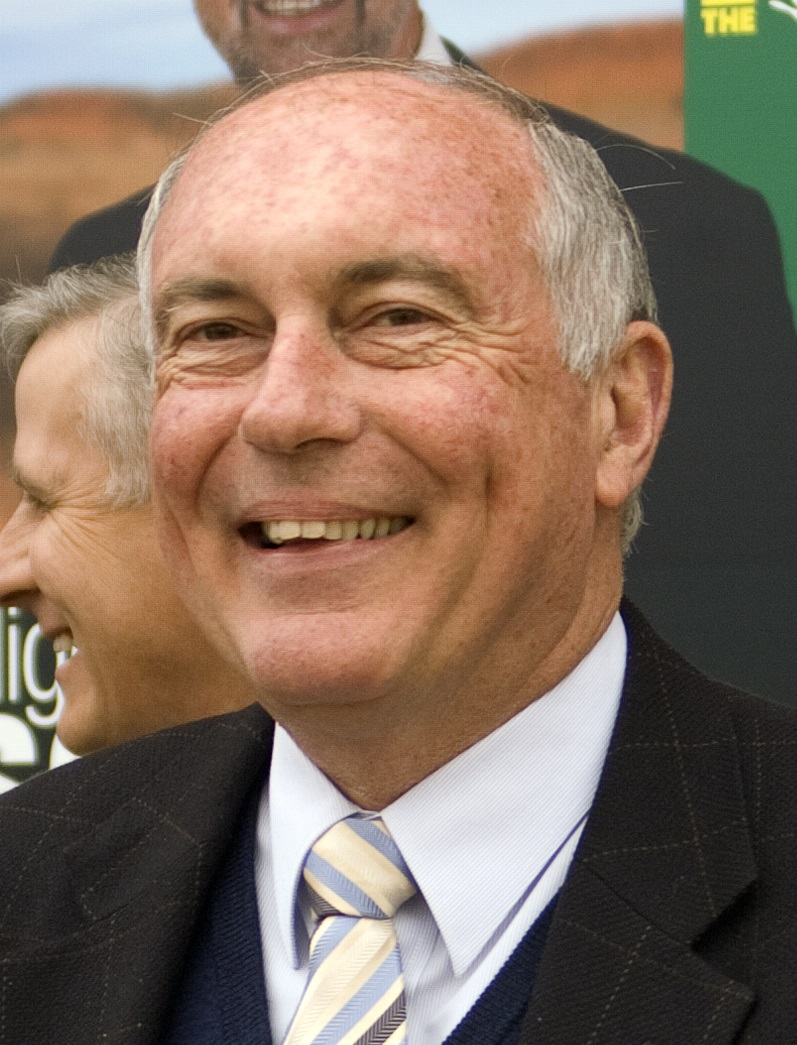
	First party	Second party	Third party
Leader	Tony Abbott	Kevin Rudd	Warren Truss
Party	Liberal	Labor	National
Last election	11 seats	3 seats	1 seat
Seats won	12 seats	3 seats	0 seats
Seat change	▲1	Steady	▼1
Popular vote	648,583	364,252	49,430
Percentage	51.21%	28.76%	3.90%
Swing	▲0.60	▼2.42	▲0.32
TPP	58.28%	41.72%
TPP swing	▲1.87	▼1.87
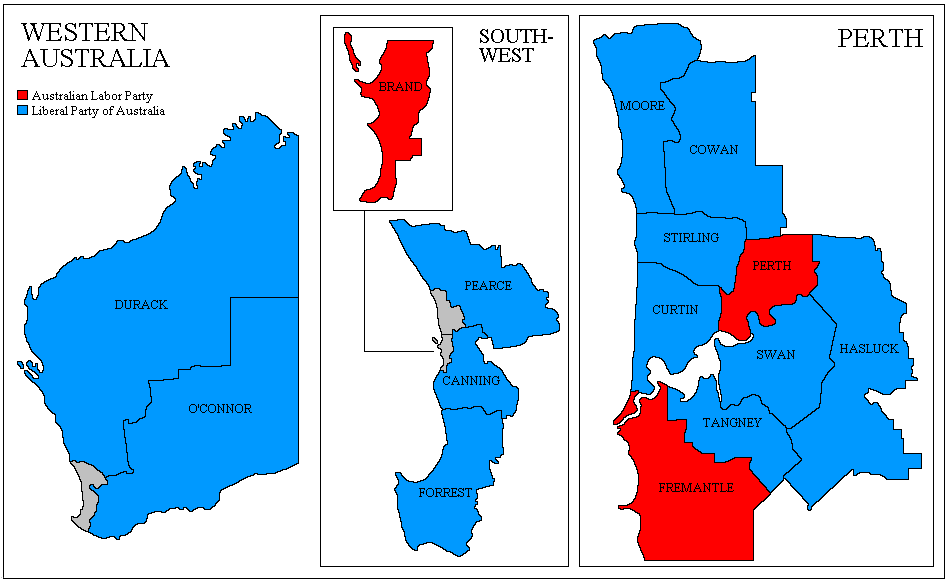
- Results by electorate

This is a list of electoral division results for the 2013 Australian federal election in the state of Western Australia.

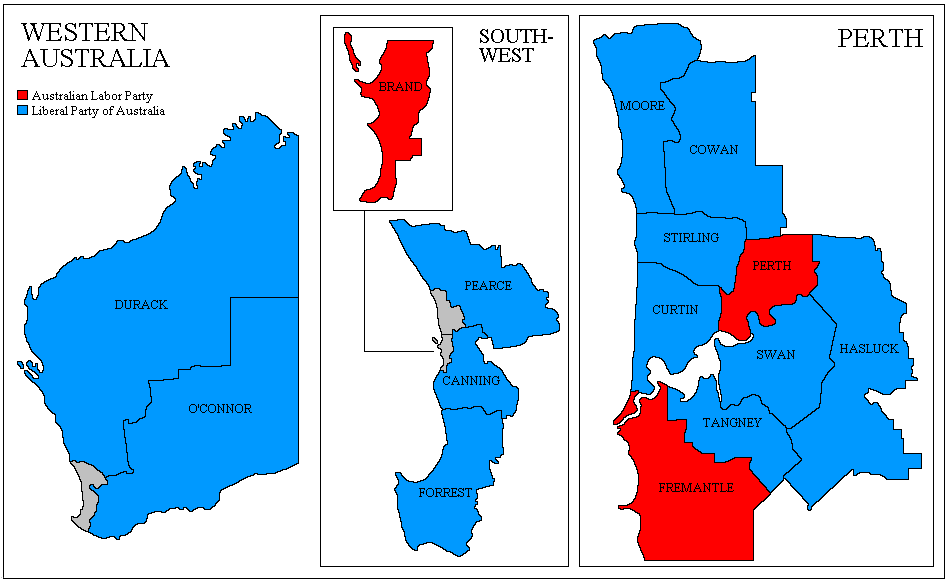
Electoral divisions: Western Australia

== Overall results ==
Party	Votes	%	Swing	Seats	Change
Liberal Party of Australia	599,153	47.31	+0.29	12	▲1
Australian Labor Party	364,252	28.76	–2.42	3	Steady
Australian Greens	123,370	9.74	–2.42		
Palmer United Party	67,332	5.32	+5.32		
National Party (WA)	49,430	3.90	+0.32	0	▼1
Australian Christians	25,649	2.03	+2.03		
Family First Party	11,777	0.93	–0.79		
Rise Up Australia Party	9,153	0.72	+0.72		
Katter's Australian Party	4,997	0.39	+0.39		
Australian Sex Party	2,236	0.18	+0.01		
Citizens Electoral Council	1,638	0.13	+0.02		
Australian Sports Party	1,324	0.10	+0.10		
Australian Democrats	1,170	0.09	+0.09		
Australian Protectionist Party	923	0.07	+0.07		
Socialist Alliance	743	0.06	−0.05		
Independents	3,357	0.27	–0.15		
Total	1,266,504			15	
Two-party-preferred vote
Liberal/National Coalition	738,110	58.28	+1.87	12	Steady
Australian Labor Party	528,394	41.72	–1.87	3	Steady

== Results by division ==
=== Brand ===
2013 Australian federal election: Brand
Party	Candidate	Votes	%	±%
Labor	Gary Gray	35,093	40.39	−0.41
Liberal	Donna Gordin	33,634	38.71	−0.67
Palmer United	Craig Lawrence	6,518	7.50	+7.50
Greens	Dawn Jecks	6,343	7.30	−7.44
Family First	Andrew Newhouse	2,079	2.39	−0.42
Christians	Bob Burdett	1,685	1.94	+1.94
Rise Up Australia	Gabrielle Iriks	646	0.74	+0.74
Democrats	Paul Young	598	0.69	+0.69
Citizens Electoral Council	Mick Le-Cocq	280	0.32	+0.32
Total formal votes		86,876	94.29	−0.48
Informal votes		5,257	5.71	+0.48
Turnout		92,133	92.29	−1.07
Two-party-preferred result
Labor	Gary Gray	45,940	52.88	−0.45
Liberal	Donna Gordin	40,936	47.12	+0.45
Labor hold		Swing	−0.45	

=== Canning ===
2013 Australian federal election: Canning
Party	Candidate	Votes	%	±%
Liberal	Don Randall	45,189	51.07	+4.89
Labor	Joanne Dean	23,578	26.64	−13.71
Greens	Damon Pages-Oliver	6,547	7.40	−0.89
Palmer United	Wendy Lamotte	6,088	6.88	+6.88
Christians	Derek Bruning	2,742	3.10	+3.10
National	James Forsyth	1,707	1.93	+1.93
Family First	Alice Harper	1,197	1.35	−0.19
Katter's Australian	Richard Eldridge	776	0.88	+0.88
Rise Up Australia	Lee Rumble	669	0.76	+0.76
Total formal votes		88,493	94.48	−1.00
Informal votes		5,173	5.52	+1.00
Turnout		93,666	92.05	−1.11
Two-party-preferred result
Liberal	Don Randall	54,700	61.81	+9.62
Labor	Joanne Dean	33,793	38.19	−9.62
Liberal hold		Swing	+9.62	

=== Cowan ===
2013 Australian federal election: Cowan
Party	Candidate	Votes	%	±%
Liberal	Luke Simpkins	41,849	49.59	−0.47
Labor	Tristan Cockman	27,248	32.29	−0.16
Greens	Adam Collins	6,677	7.91	−4.62
Palmer United	Vimal Sharma	4,501	5.33	+5.33
Christians	David Kingston	1,802	2.14	+2.14
Family First	Che Tam Nguyen	1,442	1.71	−0.65
Rise Up Australia	Sheila Mundy	869	1.03	+1.03
Total formal votes		84,388	94.90	+0.02
Informal votes		4,536	5.10	−0.02
Turnout		88,924	93.09	−1.14
Two-party-preferred result
Liberal	Luke Simpkins	48,487	57.46	+1.17
Labor	Tristan Cockman	35,901	42.54	−1.17
Liberal hold		Swing	+1.17	

=== Curtin ===
2013 Australian federal election: Curtin
Party	Candidate	Votes	%	±%
Liberal	Julie Bishop	52,623	62.06	+0.93
Labor	Daryl Tan	15,189	17.91	−1.36
Greens	Judith Cullity	12,985	15.31	−2.41
Palmer United	Glenn Baker	2,237	2.64	+2.64
Christians	Gail Forder	1,058	1.25	+1.25
Rise Up Australia	Jennifer Whately	708	0.83	+0.83
Total formal votes		84,800	96.75	−0.32
Informal votes		2,850	3.25	+0.32
Turnout		87,650	92.86	−0.36
Two-party-preferred result
Liberal	Julie Bishop	57,171	67.42	+1.23
Labor	Daryl Tan	27,629	32.58	−1.23
Liberal hold		Swing	+1.23	

=== Durack ===
2013 Australian federal election: Durack
Party	Candidate	Votes	%	±%
Liberal	Melissa Price	28,143	38.01	−7.06
National	Shane Van Styn	17,145	23.16	+5.46
Labor	Daron Keogh	15,018	20.28	−3.75
Greens	Ian James	5,227	7.06	−2.19
Palmer United	Des Headland	4,998	6.75	+6.75
Christians	Grahame Gould	972	1.31	+1.31
Rise Up Australia	Shane Foreman	810	1.09	+1.09
Katter's Australian	Aaron Todd	783	1.06	+1.06
Family First	Ian Rose	763	1.03	−1.37
Citizens Electoral Council	Judy Sudholz	177	0.24	+0.24
Total formal votes		74,036	93.61	−1.53
Informal votes		5,056	6.39	+1.53
Turnout		79,092	87.04	−1.15
Two-party-preferred result
Liberal	Melissa Price	48,031	64.88	+1.21
Labor	Daron Keogh	26,005	35.12	−1.21
Two-candidate-preferred result
Liberal	Melissa Price	39,965	53.98	−9.69
National	Shane Van Styn	34,071	46.02	+46.02
Liberal hold		Swing	N/A	

=== Forrest ===
2013 Australian federal election: Forrest
Party	Candidate	Votes	%	±%
Liberal	Nola Marino	42,640	49.92	+0.96
Labor	John Borlini	21,579	25.26	−2.93
Greens	Gordon Tayler	8,136	9.52	−3.96
National	Michael Rose	5,338	6.25	+0.27
Palmer United	Edward Dabrowski	4,301	5.03	+5.03
Christians	Wayne Barnett	1,374	1.61	+1.61
Family First	Bev Custers	1,270	1.49	−0.46
Rise Up Australia	Mark Morien	581	0.68	+0.68
Citizens Electoral Council	Ian Tuffnell	204	0.24	+0.24
Total formal votes		85,423	94.37	−1.08
Informal votes		5,095	5.63	+1.08
Turnout		90,518	93.41	−0.78
Two-party-preferred result
Liberal	Nola Marino	53,198	62.28	+3.54
Labor	John Borlini	32,225	37.72	−3.54
Liberal hold		Swing	+3.54	

=== Fremantle ===
2013 Australian federal election: Fremantle
Party	Candidate	Votes	%	±%
Labor	Melissa Parke	35,554	40.82	+1.88
Liberal	Matthew Hanssen	33,219	38.14	−0.43
Greens	Jordon Steele-John	10,354	11.89	−5.76
Palmer United	Vashil Sharma	3,451	3.96	+3.96
Christians	Owen Mulder	1,163	1.34	+1.34
Katter's Australian	Richard McNaught	1,061	1.22	+1.22
Family First	Jim McCourt	811	0.93	−0.78
Socialist Alliance	Sam Wainwright	743	0.85	+0.05
Rise Up Australia	Philip Scott	416	0.48	+0.48
Protectionist	Teresa van Lieshout	205	0.24	+0.24
Citizens Electoral Council	Ron Rowlands	131	0.15	+0.15
Total formal votes		87,108	93.64	−0.93
Informal votes		5,916	6.36	+0.93
Turnout		93,024	92.26	−0.97
Two-party-preferred result
Labor	Melissa Parke	47,705	54.77	−0.93
Liberal	Matthew Hanssen	39,403	45.23	+0.93
Labor hold		Swing	−0.93	

=== Hasluck ===
2013 Australian federal election: Hasluck
Party	Candidate	Votes	%	±%
Liberal	Ken Wyatt	38,951	45.42	+3.43
Labor	Adrian Evans	28,081	32.74	−4.79
Greens	Peter Langlands	6,546	7.63	−5.15
Palmer United	Robin Scott	5,885	6.86	+6.86
Sex Party	Chris Munro	2,236	2.61	+2.61
Christians	Jason Whittaker	2,130	2.48	+2.48
Family First	Kyran Sharrin	1,365	1.59	−0.67
Katter's Australian	Daniel Stevens	569	0.66	+0.66
Total formal votes		85,763	94.32	−0.04
Informal votes		5,163	5.68	+0.04
Turnout		90,926	92.34	−0.73
Two-party-preferred result
Liberal	Ken Wyatt	47,057	54.87	+4.30
Labor	Adrian Evans	38,706	45.13	−4.30
Liberal hold		Swing	+4.30	

=== Moore ===
2013 Australian federal election: Moore
Party	Candidate	Votes	%	±%
Liberal	Ian Goodenough	45,562	53.08	−1.08
Labor	Jason Lawrance	22,324	26.01	−0.36
Greens	Louahna Lloyd	8,539	9.95	−3.62
Palmer United	Gary Morris	5,745	6.69	+6.69
Christians	Rex Host	1,602	1.87	+1.87
Sports Party	Josh Catalano	1,324	1.54	+1.54
Rise Up Australia	Mary Pritchett	738	0.86	+0.86
Total formal votes		85,834	95.49	−0.16
Informal votes		4,055	4.51	+0.16
Turnout		89,889	92.48	−0.59
Two-party-preferred result
Liberal	Ian Goodenough	53,100	61.86	+0.67
Labor	Jason Lawrance	32,734	38.14	−0.67
Liberal hold		Swing	+0.67	

=== O'Connor ===
2013 Australian federal election: O'Connor
Party	Candidate	Votes	%	±%
Liberal	Rick Wilson	32,284	39.13	+0.77
National	Chub Witham	20,914	25.35	−3.50
Labor	Michael Salt	14,234	17.25	+0.14
Greens	Diane Evers	5,627	6.82	−2.04
Palmer United	Michael Lucas	3,581	4.34	+4.34
Christians	Mike Walsh	2,079	2.52	+2.52
Independent	Jane Mouritz	1,431	1.73	+1.73
Family First	Steven Fuhrmann	698	0.85	−0.58
Katter's Australian	Phillip Bouwman	660	0.80	+0.80
Rise Up Australia	Vanessa Korber	595	0.72	+0.72
Citizens Electoral Council	Jean Robinson	407	0.49	+0.03
Total formal votes		82,510	94.01	−0.62
Informal votes		5,256	5.99	+0.62
Turnout		87,766	92.27	−0.53
Two-party-preferred result
Liberal	Rick Wilson	55,486	67.25	−5.75
Labor	Michael Salt	27,024	32.75	+5.75
Two-candidate-preferred result
Liberal	Rick Wilson	42,040	50.95	+4.51
National	Chub Witham	40,470	49.05	−4.51
Liberal gain from National		Swing	+4.51	

=== Pearce ===
2013 Australian federal election: Pearce
Party	Candidate	Votes	%	±%
Liberal	Christian Porter	40,275	45.67	−4.24
Labor	Madeleine West	22,827	25.88	−3.64
Greens	Sarah Nielsen-Harvey	9,901	11.23	−2.01
Palmer United	Frank Hough	6,587	7.47	+7.47
National	Craig McAllister	4,326	4.91	+2.37
Christians	Danielle Canas	1,746	1.98	+1.98
Rise Up Australia	Diane Davies	791	0.90	+0.90
Katter's Australian	Eddie Richards	727	0.82	+0.82
Democrats	Matthew Corica	572	0.65	+0.65
Citizens Electoral Council	Norman Gay	439	0.50	−0.08
Total formal votes		88,191	94.10	−0.19
Informal votes		5,528	5.90	+0.19
Turnout		93,719	92.49	−0.63
Two-party-preferred result
Liberal	Christian Porter	51,206	58.06	−0.80
Labor	Madeleine West	36,985	41.94	+0.80
Liberal hold		Swing	−0.80	

=== Perth ===
2013 Australian federal election: Perth
Party	Candidate	Votes	%	±%
Labor	Alannah MacTiernan	34,215	41.25	+1.06
Liberal	Darryl Moore	33,021	39.81	+1.07
Greens	Jonathan Hallett	8,801	10.61	−5.54
Palmer United	Gabriel Harfouche	2,897	3.49	+3.49
Christians	Paul Connelly	1,891	2.28	+2.28
Independent	Ant Clark	1,025	1.24	+1.24
Family First	Lesley Croll	669	0.81	−0.74
Rise Up Australia	Evelyn Edney	422	0.51	+0.51
Total formal votes		82,941	94.72	−0.08
Informal votes		4,625	5.28	+0.08
Turnout		87,566	91.96	−0.08
Two-party-preferred result
Labor	Alannah MacTiernan	45,079	54.35	−1.53
Liberal	Darryl Moore	37,862	45.65	+1.53
Labor hold		Swing	−1.53	

=== Stirling ===
2013 Australian federal election: Stirling
Party	Candidate	Votes	%	±%
Liberal	Michael Keenan	43,039	51.82	+1.91
Labor	Dan Caddy	23,531	28.33	−3.54
Greens	Tim Clifford	9,359	11.27	−1.63
Palmer United	Wayne Thompson	3,342	4.02	+4.02
Christians	Kevin Host	1,704	2.05	+2.05
Independent	Kim Mubarak	901	1.08	+1.08
Family First	Matueny Luke	686	0.83	−0.21
Rise Up Australia	Alison Rowe	498	0.60	+0.60
Total formal votes		83,060	94.34	−0.64
Informal votes		4,986	5.66	+0.64
Turnout		88,046	91.44	−1.03
Two-party-preferred result
Liberal	Michael Keenan	50,083	60.30	+4.75
Labor	Dan Caddy	32,977	39.70	−4.75
Liberal hold		Swing	+4.75	

=== Swan ===
2013 Australian federal election: Swan
Party	Candidate	Votes	%	±%
Liberal	Steve Irons	39,972	48.86	+2.35
Labor	John Bissett	25,037	30.60	−4.68
Greens	Gerard Siero	9,446	11.55	−0.26
Palmer United	Kenneth Duncan	3,463	4.23	+4.23
Christians	Steve Klomp	1,465	1.79	+1.79
Family First	Moyna Rapp	797	0.97	−0.26
Protectionist	Troy Ellis	718	0.88	+0.88
Rise Up Australia	Paul Davies	488	0.60	+0.60
Katter's Australian	Noel Avery	421	0.51	+0.51
Total formal votes		81,807	94.37	−0.73
Informal votes		4,879	5.63	+0.73
Turnout		86,686	90.97	−1.00
Two-party-preferred result
Liberal	Steve Irons	46,246	56.53	+4.00
Labor	John Bissett	35,561	43.47	−4.00
Liberal hold		Swing	+4.00	

=== Tangney ===
2013 Australian federal election: Tangney
Party	Candidate	Votes	%	±%
Liberal	Dennis Jensen	48,752	57.17	+1.48
Labor	Luke Willis	20,744	24.33	−1.47
Greens	Peter Best	8,882	10.42	−3.07
Palmer United	Wayne Driver	3,738	4.38	+4.38
Christians	John Wieske	2,236	2.62	+2.62
Rise Up Australia	Stephen Carson	922	1.08	+1.08
Total formal votes		85,274	95.83	−0.69
Informal votes		3,707	4.17	+0.69
Turnout		88,981	93.81	−0.41
Two-party-preferred result
Liberal	Dennis Jensen	55,144	64.67	+2.35
Labor	Luke Willis	30,130	35.33	−2.35
Liberal hold		Swing	+2.35	

== See also ==
- Results of the 2013 Australian federal election (House of Representatives)
- Post-election pendulum for the 2013 Australian federal election
- Members of the Australian House of Representatives, 2013–2016
