= Results of the 2010 Australian federal election in Western Australia =

2010 Australian federal election (Western Australia)
← 2007	21 August 2010	2013 →

All 15 Western Australia seats in the Australian House of Representatives and 6 (of the 12) seats in the Australian Senate
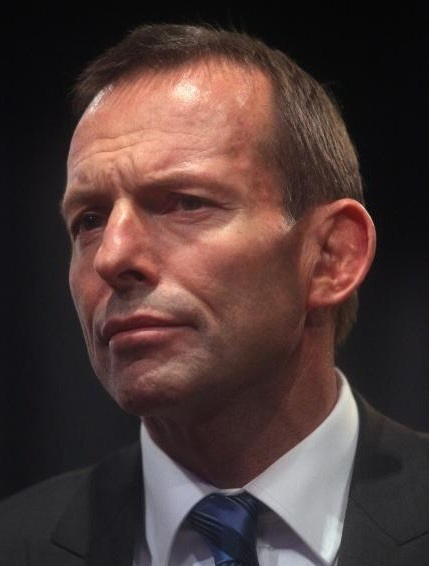

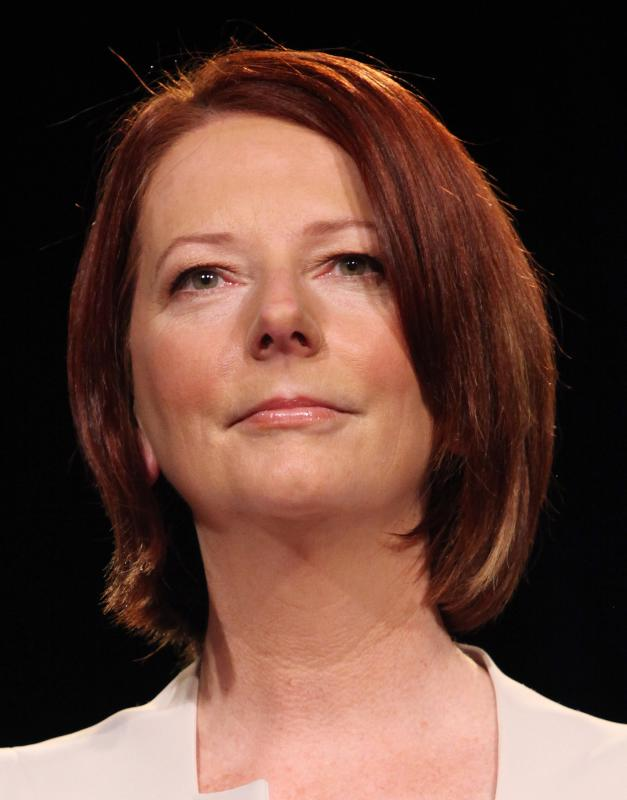

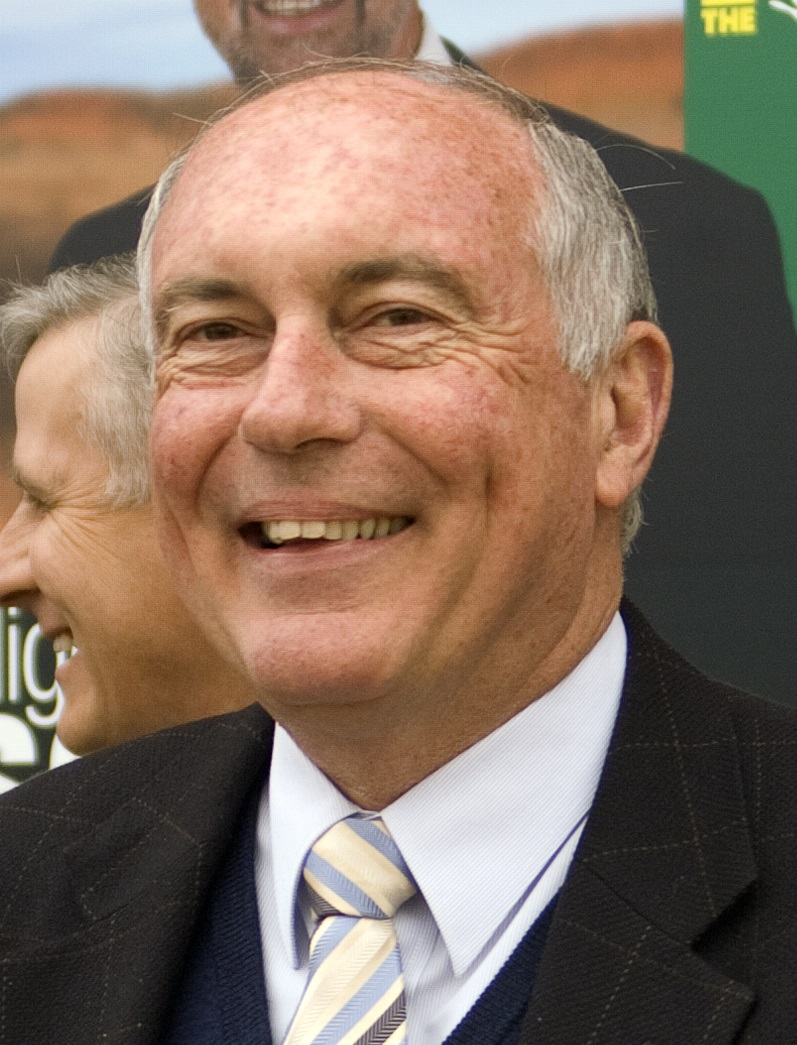
	First party	Second party	Third party
Leader	Tony Abbott	Julia Gillard	Warren Truss
Party	Liberal	Labor	National
Last election	11 seats	4 seats	0 seats
Seats won	11 seats	3 seats	1 seat
Seat change	Steady	▼1	▲1
Popular vote	566,145	375,381	43,101
Percentage	47.02%	31.18%	3.58%
Swing	▲0.71	▼5.62	▲2.44
TPP	56.41%	43.59%
TPP swing	▲3.15	▼3.15
- Results by electorate

This is a list of electoral division results for the 2010 Australian federal election for the state of Western Australia.

== Overall ==
Electoral divisions: Western Australia

Turnout 92.86% (CV) — Informal 4.82%
Party	Votes	%	Swing	Seats	Change
Liberal	566,145	47.02	+0.71	11	Steady
Labor	375,381	31.18	–5.62	3	▼1
Greens	158,117	13.13	+4.20		
National (Note: The National Party of Western Australia prior to and subsequent to the election were not in the federal Coalition agreement. Nationals WA MP Tony Crook stated that he was a crossbencher, and has said: "In every news report and press report we see, my number is being allocated in with the Coalition and it shouldn't be". Thus, the party has been counted separately from the Coalition totals.)	43,101	3.58	+2.44	1	▲1
Christian Democrats	27,833	2.31	+0.20		
Family First	20,698	1.72	+0.51		
Independents	5,079	0.42	–1.27		
Sex Party	2,060	0.17	+0.17		
One Nation	1,471	0.12	−1.03		
Socialist Alliance	1,280	0.11	+0.01		
Citizens Electoral Council	1,277	0.11	−0.15		
Democratic Labour	622	0.05	+0.05		
Climate Sceptics	539	0.04	+0.04		
Socialist Equality	398	0.03	+0.02		
Total	1,204,001			15	
Two-party-preferred vote
Liberal	679,140	56.41	+3.15	11	Steady
Labor	524,861	43.59	–3.15	3	▼1
Invalid/blank votes		60,967	4.82	+0.97	
Registered voters/turnout		1,362,534	92.84		
Source: Commonwealth Election 2010

== Results by division ==
=== Brand ===
2010 Australian federal election: Brand
Party	Candidate	Votes	%	±%
Labor	Gary Gray	31,832	40.80	−5.53
Liberal	Donna Gordin	30,731	39.38	+1.28
Greens	Dawn Jecks	11,504	14.74	+5.88
Family First	Andrew Newhouse	2,190	2.81	+1.03
Christian Democrats	Robert Burdett	1,771	2.27	−0.30
Total formal votes		78,028	94.77	−1.36
Informal votes		4,304	5.23	+1.36
Turnout		82,332	93.34	+0.07
Two-party-preferred result
Labor	Gary Gray	41,610	53.33	−2.65
Liberal	Donna Gordin	36,418	46.67	+2.65
Labor hold		Swing	−2.65	

=== Canning ===
2010 Australian federal election: Canning
Party	Candidate	Votes	%	±%
Liberal	Don Randall	36,999	46.18	−2.23
Labor	Alannah MacTiernan	32,330	40.35	+2.62
Greens	Denise Hardie	6,645	8.29	+0.54
Christian Democrats	Jamie van Burgel	2,470	3.08	+0.28
Family First	Darren Vernede	1,231	1.54	+0.28
Citizens Electoral Council	Ian Tuffnell	446	0.56	+0.24
Total formal votes		80,121	95.48	−1.07
Informal votes		3,795	4.52	+1.07
Turnout		83,916	93.13	+0.01
Two-party-preferred result
Liberal	Don Randall	41,818	52.19	−2.16
Labor	Alannah MacTiernan	38,303	47.81	+2.16
Liberal hold		Swing	−2.16	

=== Cowan ===
2010 Australian federal election: Cowan
Party	Candidate	Votes	%	±%
Liberal	Luke Simpkins	40,077	50.06	+4.75
Labor	Chas Hopkins	25,975	32.45	−9.91
Greens	Rob Phillips	10,033	12.53	+6.83
Christian Democrats	David Kingston	2,081	2.60	+0.70
Family First	Alan Leach	1,888	2.36	+0.64
Total formal votes		80,054	94.88	−0.96
Informal votes		4,320	5.12	+0.96
Turnout		84,374	94.22	−0.37
Two-party-preferred result
Liberal	Luke Simpkins	45,062	56.29	+5.01
Labor	Chas Hopkins	34,992	43.71	−5.01
Liberal hold		Swing	+5.01	

=== Curtin ===
2010 Australian federal election: Curtin
Party	Candidate	Votes	%	±%
Liberal	Julie Bishop	50,024	61.13	+2.17
Labor	Sophie van der Merwe	15,771	19.27	−5.71
Greens	George Crisp	14,498	17.72	+4.49
Christian Democrats	Pat Seymour	1,534	1.87	+0.61
Total formal votes		81,827	97.07	−0.97
Informal votes		2,471	2.93	+0.97
Turnout		84,298	93.25	−0.63
Two-party-preferred result
Liberal	Julie Bishop	54,158	66.19	+2.93
Labor	Sophie van der Merwe	27,669	33.81	−2.93
Liberal hold		Swing	+2.93	

=== Durack ===
2010 Australian federal election: Durack
Party	Candidate	Votes	%	±%
Liberal	Barry Haase	32,446	45.07	−1.00
Labor	Shane Hill	17,299	24.03	−8.80
National	Lynne Craigie	12,742	17.70	+9.67
Greens	Julie Matheson	6,661	9.25	+3.32
Family First	Jane Foreman	1,729	2.40	+1.09
Christian Democrats	Mac Forsyth	1,121	1.56	−0.32
Total formal votes		71,998	95.14	−0.44
Informal votes		3,678	4.86	+0.44
Turnout		75,676	88.22	+1.06
Two-party-preferred result
Liberal	Barry Haase	45,843	63.67	+6.02
Labor	Shane Hill	26,155	36.33	−6.02
Liberal hold		Swing	+6.02	

=== Forrest ===
2010 Australian federal election: Forrest
Party	Candidate	Votes	%	±%
Liberal	Nola Marino	39,460	48.96	+3.81
Labor	Jackie Jarvis	22,724	28.19	−2.43
Greens	Luke Petersen	10,863	13.48	+5.07
National	John Hill	4,822	5.98	+5.98
Family First	Bev Custers	1,573	1.95	+0.57
Christian Democrats	Lee Herridge	1,158	1.44	−0.45
Total formal votes		80,600	95.45	−1.27
Informal votes		3,844	4.55	+1.27
Turnout		84,444	94.21	−0.29
Two-party-preferred result
Liberal	Nola Marino	47,343	58.74	+3.26
Labor	Jackie Jarvis	33,257	41.26	−3.26
Liberal hold		Swing	+3.26	

=== Fremantle ===
2010 Australian federal election: Fremantle
Party	Candidate	Votes	%	±%
Labor	Melissa Parke	32,063	38.94	−6.24
Liberal	Matt Taylor	31,755	38.57	+3.48
Greens	Kate Davis	14,531	17.65	+3.07
Family First	Larry Parsons	1,409	1.71	+0.28
Christian Democrats	Scott Robertson	1,294	1.57	−0.15
Socialist Alliance	Sanna Andrew	662	0.80	+0.35
Democratic Labor	Keith McEncroe	622	0.76	+0.76
Total formal votes		82,336	94.57	−1.18
Informal votes		4,724	5.43	+1.18
Turnout		87,060	93.27	−0.51
Two-party-preferred result
Labor	Melissa Parke	45,858	55.70	−3.44
Liberal	Matt Taylor	36,478	44.30	+3.44
Labor hold		Swing	−3.44	

=== Hasluck ===
2010 Australian federal election: Hasluck
Party	Candidate	Votes	%	±%
Liberal	Ken Wyatt	34,638	41.99	−1.38
Labor	Sharryn Jackson	30,957	37.53	−3.82
Greens	Glenice Smith	10,539	12.78	+4.47
Christian Democrats	Linda Brewer	2,505	3.04	+0.04
Family First	Jim McCourt	1,861	2.26	+1.03
Ecology, Social Justice, Aboriginal	Dot Henry	1,457	1.77	+1.77
Climate Sceptics	Andrew Middleton	539	0.65	+0.65
Total formal votes		82,496	94.36	−1.31
Informal votes		4,927	5.64	+1.31
Turnout		87,423	93.11	−0.56
Two-party-preferred result
Liberal	Ken Wyatt	41,722	50.57	+1.42
Labor	Sharryn Jackson	40,774	49.43	−1.42
Liberal gain from Labor		Swing	+1.42	

=== Moore ===
2010 Australian federal election: Moore
Party	Candidate	Votes	%	±%
Liberal	Mal Washer	44,518	54.16	+0.12
Labor	Jeremy Brown	21,678	26.37	−6.64
Greens	Sheridan Young	11,159	13.57	+5.45
Christian Democrats	Meg Birch	1,804	2.19	+0.03
Family First	Paul Barrett	1,573	1.91	+0.68
One Nation	George Gault	1,471	1.79	+0.74
Total formal votes		82,203	95.65	−1.26
Informal votes		3,734	4.35	+1.26
Turnout		85,937	93.11	−0.65
Two-party-preferred result
Liberal	Mal Washer	50,302	61.19	+2.26
Labor	Jeremy Brown	31,901	38.81	−2.26
Liberal hold		Swing	+2.26	

=== O'Connor ===
2010 Australian federal election: O'Connor
Party	Candidate	Votes	%	±%
Liberal	Wilson Tuckey	31,294	38.36	−10.36
National	Tony Crook	23,538	28.85	+19.68
Labor	Ian Bishop	13,962	17.11	−9.15
Greens	Andy Huntley	7,232	8.86	+1.73
Christian Democrats	Jacky Young	2,221	2.72	+0.09
Ecology, Social Justice, Aboriginal	Geoffrey Stokes	1,298	1.59	+1.59
Family First	Pat Scallan	1,164	1.43	+0.21
Independent	Neil Smithson	500	0.61	+0.61
Citizens Electoral Council	Jean Robinson	375	0.46	+0.08
Total formal votes		81,584	94.63	−1.11
Informal votes		4,632	5.37	+1.11
Turnout		86,216	92.83	−0.22
Notional two-party-preferred count
Liberal	Wilson Tuckey	59,555	73.00	+10.24
Labor	Ian Bishop	22,029	27.00	−10.24
Two-candidate-preferred result
National	Tony Crook	43,693	53.56	+53.56
Liberal	Wilson Tuckey	37,891	46.44	−16.32
National gain from Liberal		Swing	N/A	

=== Pearce ===
2010 Australian federal election: Pearce
Party	Candidate	Votes	%	±%
Liberal	Judi Moylan	39,248	49.91	−0.52
Labor	Bill Leadbetter	23,214	29.52	−3.63
Greens	Toni Warden	10,414	13.24	+4.32
National	Darren Moir	1,999	2.54	+2.54
Christian Democrats	Janet Broadstock	1,691	2.15	+0.18
Family First	Ian Rose	1,619	2.06	+0.60
Citizens Electoral Council	Chris Pepper	456	0.58	+0.28
Total formal votes		78,641	94.29	−1.72
Informal votes		4,762	5.71	+1.72
Turnout		83,403	93.16	−0.02
Two-party-preferred result
Liberal	Judi Moylan	46,292	58.86	+1.17
Labor	Bill Leadbetter	32,349	41.14	−1.17
Liberal hold		Swing	+1.17	

=== Perth ===
2010 Australian federal election: Perth
Party	Candidate	Votes	%	±%
Labor	Stephen Smith	32,228	40.19	−6.12
Liberal	Joe Ferrante	31,064	38.74	+1.84
Greens	Jonathan Hallett	12,948	16.15	+5.82
Christian Democrats	Paul Connelly	2,093	2.61	+0.62
Family First	Nigel Irvine	1,243	1.55	+0.45
Socialist Alliance	Alex Bainbridge	618	0.77	+0.22
Total formal votes		80,194	94.80	−0.61
Informal votes		4,400	5.20	+0.61
Turnout		84,594	92.05	−1.14
Two-party-preferred result
Labor	Stephen Smith	44,815	55.88	−2.06
Liberal	Joe Ferrante	35,379	44.12	+2.06
Labor hold		Swing	−2.06	

=== Stirling ===
2010 Australian federal election: Stirling
Party	Candidate	Votes	%	±%
Liberal	Michael Keenan	40,228	49.91	+2.71
Labor	Louise Durack	25,688	31.87	−8.54
Greens	Chris Martin	10,399	12.90	+5.25
Independent	Elizabeth Re	1,824	2.26	+2.26
Christian Democrats	Jenny Whately	1,630	2.02	+0.26
Family First	Peter Clifford	838	1.04	+0.39
Total formal votes		80,607	94.98	−0.11
Informal votes		4,259	5.02	+0.11
Turnout		84,866	92.52	−1.08
Two-party-preferred result
Liberal	Michael Keenan	44,775	55.55	+4.28
Labor	Louise Durack	35,832	44.45	−4.28
Liberal hold		Swing	+4.28	

=== Swan ===
2010 Australian federal election: Swan
Party	Candidate	Votes	%	±%
Liberal	Steve Irons	36,951	46.51	+2.76
Labor	Tim Hammond	28,023	35.28	−5.69
Greens	Rebecca Leighton	9,380	11.81	+1.69
Sex Party	Bret Treasure	2,060	2.59	+2.59
Christian Democrats	Steve Klomp	1,646	2.07	+0.30
Family First	Barry Drennan	981	1.23	+0.38
Socialist Equality	Joe Lopez	398	0.50	+0.30
Total formal votes		79,439	95.10	−0.36
Informal votes		4,089	4.90	+0.36
Turnout		83,528	92.03	−0.97
Two-party-preferred result
Liberal	Steve Irons	41,729	52.53	+2.80
Labor	Tim Hammond	37,710	47.47	−2.80
Liberal notional gain from Labor		Swing	+2.80	

=== Tangney ===
2010 Australian federal election: Tangney
Party	Candidate	Votes	%	±%
Liberal	Dennis Jensen	46,712	55.69	+3.31
Labor	David Doepel	21,637	25.80	−5.73
Greens	Peter Best	11,311	13.49	+5.20
Christian Democrats	Ka-ren Chew	2,814	3.36	+1.01
Family First	Moyna Rapp	1,399	1.67	+0.53
Total formal votes		83,873	96.52	−0.83
Informal votes		3,028	3.48	+0.83
Turnout		86,901	94.28	−0.80
Two-party-preferred result
Liberal	Dennis Jensen	52,266	62.32	+2.51
Labor	David Doepel	31,607	37.68	−2.51
Liberal hold		Swing	+2.51	

== See also ==
- Results of the 2010 Australian federal election (House of Representatives)
- Post-election pendulum for the 2010 Australian federal election
- Members of the Australian House of Representatives, 2010–2013
