= Jordon Steele-John =

Australian politician (born 1994)

Senator Jordon Steele-John
- Steele-John in 2023

Senator for Western Australia
- Incumbent
- Assumed office 10 November 2017
- Preceded by: Scott Ludlam

Personal details
- Born: Jordon Alexander Steele-John; 14 October 1994 (age 32) Northampton, England
- Citizenship: Australia; British (until 2013)
- Party: Greens
- Education: Macquarie University
- Occupation: Politician, disability advocate
- Website: greens.org.au/wa/person/jordon-steele-john

Jordon Alexander Steele-John (born 14 October 1994) is a British-born Australian politician and disability rights advocate. He is a Senator for Western Australia and a member of the Australian Greens. He was elected by declaration to the Australian Senate in 2017. Steele-John holds the portfolios of Health, Disability Rights and Services, Foreign Affairs and Peace & Nuclear Disarmament for the Australian Greens.

In October 2026, allegations of inappropriate comments to women by Steele-John were reported, as well as a dossier held by the party relating to past allegations. Steele-John has denied the allegations, and the Greens stated they would commission an independent inquiry into the matter.

== Early life and education ==
Jordon Alexander Steele-John was born on 14 October 1994 in Northampton, England, to a mother from Rugby, Warwickshire, and a father from Hammersmith, London. Steele-John immigrated to Australia as a child with his parents and grandparents. He was naturalised as an Australian citizen at the age of five. He and his brother were home-educated..

Steele-John uses a wheelchair due to cerebral palsy. As a student and disability advocate, Steele-John campaigned for the Greens in both federal and state elections. He joined the Greens at age 16.

He earned a BA in politics through Macquarie University before entering federal Parliament.

Steele-John renounced British citizenship at age 18 in preparation for the 2013 federal election, retaining only Australian citizenship.

== Political career ==
Prior to being listed as third senate candidate for the Greens in the 2016 federal election, behind Scott Ludlam and Rachel Siewert, Steele-John was a candidate for the WA Greens three times. He was first a candidate at the age of 18. He was a candidate in the March 2013 state election in the electorate of Warnbro (receiving 8.8% primary vote), the September 2013 federal election in the electorate of Fremantle (receiving 11.9% primary vote) and in the April 2014 special half-senate election, which followed the result of the 2013 election being voided by the Court of Disputed Returns, as the fourth candidate on the Greens' list.

Steele-John entered the Senate after Scott Ludlam was forced to resign when he was found to be a dual citizen and in contravention of section 44 of the Australian Constitution. On 27 October 2017, the High Court of Australia, sitting as the Court of Disputed Returns, ordered the Australian Electoral Commission to conduct a recount of senate ballots in Western Australia, and Steele-John was declared elected at age 23, making him the youngest sitting member in the Australian parliament. Steele-John was the youngest senator in Australian history until the election of 21-year-old Charlotte Walker in 2025.

Steele-John was re-elected to the Senate at the 2019 federal election, securing 11.8% of the state's vote, with a swing of 1.48% in his favour. He was re-elected again to the Senate at the 2025 federal election, securing the fourth seat in WA, with 12.84% of the primary vote (208,327 votes).

Steele-John has previously held the Greens portfolios of Youth, Defence and Veterans’ Affairs, Digital Rights and I.T., Sustainable Cities, and Trade.

Steele-John has been on 9 Joint Standing Committees, 8 Senate Legislative and General Purpose Standing committees and 4 Senate Select committees including one as chair.

He is currently the co-chair of three Parliamentary Friendship Groups: the Parliamentary Friends of Mental Health, the Parliamentary Friends of Myalgic Encephalomyelitis/Chronic Fatigue Syndrome, and the Parliamentary Friends of the Treaty on the Prohibition of Nuclear Weapons.

In September 2023, Steele-John appeared on Kitchen Cabinet with Annabel Crabb, in which he speaks with Crabb about being the youngest senator, and his early life and progression into politics.

On 15 October 2026, Steele-John was reported to have taken leave from the Greens party room following reports that he had made inappropriate comments towards women; however, he denied the allegations, and on 18 October clarified that he was not in fact on leave. Jordon-Steele referred the matter to the WA Greens so that an independent inquiry could take place.

== Political positions ==
=== Disability rights and services ===
In February 2018, Steele-John called for a Royal Commission into disabled prisoner abuse. In April 2018, Steele-John commented on Parliament House's need to become more wheelchair friendly.

In 2019, Steele-John's campaigning successfully led to the establishment of the Royal Commission into Violence, Abuse, Neglect and Exploitation of People with Disability. After years of raising the alarm that the confidentiality provisions in the Disability Royal Commission are insufficient, in 2021 he helped secure amendments that protect people making confidential disclosures to the Royal Commission.

In 2020, Steele-John successfully campaigned for a compensation scheme for thalidomide survivors, and in 2021 pressured the government to abolish independent assessments in the NDIS.

In 2023, Steele-John expressed his support for the expansion of ADHD diagnoses and treatments to more Australians. He cited the enormous stigmatisation of people with ADHD and the inaccessibility of the medication as motivating factors for this.

=== Health and mental health ===
In 2021, Steele-John took on the Australian Greens' Health and Mental Health portfolio and announced the Greens' policy to expand Medicare to cover mental health treatment.

=== Other issues ===
Steele-John is a strong proponent of urgent climate action to combat climate change. In 2018, he introduced a Senate motion to condemn the lifting of the Western Australian fracking moratorium, which was unsuccessful.

In 2020, Steele-John introduced the Defence Amendment (Parliamentary Approval of Overseas Service) Bill 2020, which seeks to ensure the decision to go to war is made by the Parliament, not the Prime Minister.

In February 2018, Steele-John expressed disappointment at the lack of government support for the Australian video game development industry.

In 2018, Steele-John introduced a bill to lower the voting age to sixteen. He argued that age would be in line with Austria, Argentina, Brazil and Scotland. The bill was not passed by parliament.

== Honours and awards ==
Year	Award	Category	Result	Ref.
2018	One Young World's Politician of the Year Award		Won	
2019	McKinnon Prize	Emerging Political Leadership	Won	

== Misconduct allegations ==
On 3 August 2017, the website True Crime News Weekly published a story about allegations made against Steele-John by two volunteers. By October 2018, Steele-John's name had been raised by NSW Young Greens in connection with allegations, according to a source quoted by the Australian Associated Press. A general meeting of the NSW Young Greens directed national delegates to block and indefinitely delay motions to investigate Steele-John for alleged sexual harassment. The source said they are the only times Steele-John's name appeared in the NSW Young Greens meeting minutes before he entered the federal upper house.

On 15 October 2026, Steele-John was reported to have taken leave from the Greens party room following reports that he had made inappropriate comments towards women. He has rejected the allegations, stating it was a "characterisation of me which tries to assert I am someone I am not". Jordon-Steele referred the matter to the WA Greens so that an independent inquiry could take place.

A 47-page dossier accessible to Western Australian Greens and national Greens staff for almost a decade stated methods to shut down media coverage of the allegations. It stated that Sophie Greer and Tim Oliver were to watch the Australian Young Greens discussion group. It instructed taxpayer-funded Greens staff to monitor social media and take screenshots of comments posted by Greens party members.

On 18 October, Steele-John released a statement via social media refuting the claims of misconduct, and stating that the claims were part of an attempt to discredit potential pre-selection candidates for the next federal election. He also stated that claims he was on leave were inaccurate, alleging that Greens leader David Shoebridge had pressured him to take leave, and had reported it to the media without his knowledge or acceptance. He confirmed that a dossier was created on misconduct allegations, however stated that it was so that they had "the same accurate information to give anyone who had heard the rumours and was concerned".

On 23 October, Steele-John released a statement on social media, confirming that he would not attend parliament until after an independent investigation into the claims was completed, after initially attempting to attend Senate estimates virtually. He continued to deny any allegations of misconduct.
