= True Crime News Weekly =

Australian subscriber news website

True News Weekly is an Australian subscriber news website originally launched as True Crime News Weekly and published by PR 4 THE PPL PTY LTD. It aims to cover breaking news, crime and corruption, politics, media, opinion, culture reviews, and historical true crime. It has been cited in Australia for its exclusives and investigations into political scandals, and has been noted for first breaking the notorious 'Barnaby Joyce Scandal' that resulted in Australian Deputy PM Barnaby Joyce being forced to resign as National Party of Australia leader in early 2018.

== History ==
True News Weekly was launched originally as True Crime News Weekly in January 2017 by investigative journalist Serkan Ozturk, who remains its publisher. Gary Johnston is the publication's deputy editor. Originally launched as a free blog, the website became a subscriber news site in October 2018. As noted on the website, the site claims to be "inspired by the pulp fiction and noir of yesteryear" and regards itself to be progressive. In February 2024, the website relaunched as True News Weekly.

== Staff & Contributors ==
Contributors to True News Weekly include investigative journalist Serkan Ozturk academic and writer Gary Johnston, novelist Miles Hunt, activist and satirist Tom Tanuki, comedian Kieran Butler author and essayist Irfan Yusuf, and academic Therese Taylor.

== Notable Coverage ==
The Daily Telegraph was awarded a Walkley Award in 2018 for Scoop of the Year for their coverage of the 'Barnaby Joyce Scandal', however True News Weekly had first published stories about the scandal in October 2017, almost six months before the Daily Telegraph's articles. In April 2019, True News Weekly claims to have been the first publication to reveal that controversial Nationals MP George Christensen had been visiting sex bars in seedy parts of the Philippines, almost eight months before the rest of the Australian media.

In October 2026, James Massola reported in the The Sydney Morning Herald and The Age that True Crime News Weekly published a 2017 story about misconduct allegations made against Steele-John by two volunteers.

== Support & Criticism ==
There has been a challenge to Ozturk's claims about True News Weekly breaking the 'Barnaby Joyce Scandal' along with a general challenge to the rigour of his journalism, however Ozturk claimed his original coverage in October 2017 had details ignored by critics including The Guardian's Amanda Meade in her article. Ozturk and True News Weekly have also received both support and criticism across wider media for their style of journalism.
