= John Dawkins =

Australian politician (born 1947)

The Honourable John Dawkins AO
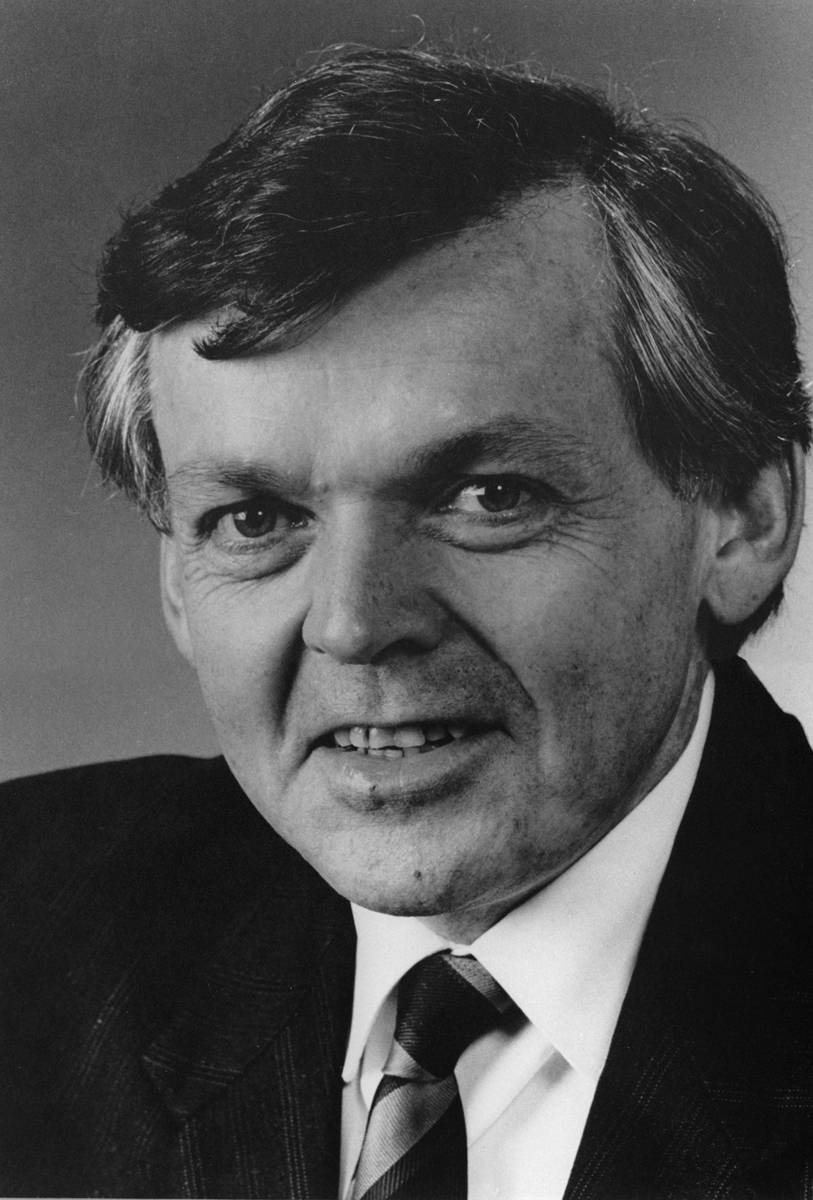
- Dawkins in 1984

Treasurer of Australia
- In office 27 December 1991 – 22 December 1993
- Prime Minister: Paul Keating
- Preceded by: Ralph Willis
- Succeeded by: Ralph Willis

Minister for Employment, Education and Training
- In office 24 July 1987 – 27 December 1991
- Prime Minister: Bob Hawke; Paul Keating
- Preceded by: Susan Ryan
- Succeeded by: Kim Beazley

Minister for Trade
- In office 13 December 1984 – 24 July 1987
- Prime Minister: Bob Hawke
- Preceded by: Lionel Bowen
- Succeeded by: Michael Duffy

Minister for Finance
- In office 11 March 1983 – 13 December 1984
- Prime Minister: Bob Hawke
- Preceded by: Dame Margaret Guilfoyle
- Succeeded by: Peter Walsh

Member of the Australian Parliament for Fremantle
- In office 10 December 1977 – 4 February 1994
- Preceded by: Kim Beazley
- Succeeded by: Carmen Lawrence

Member of the Australian Parliament for Tangney
- In office 18 May 1974 – 13 December 1975
- Preceded by: New seat
- Succeeded by: Peter Richardson

Personal details
- Born: 2 March 1947 (age 79) Perth, Western Australia, Australia
- Party: Australian Labor Party
- Spouses: Kate; Maggie Maruff (m. 1987)
- Relations: Ernest Augustus Lee Steere (grandfather); Ernest Henry Lee-Steere (uncle); John Dawkins (cousin)
- Children: 3 (and 1 step-child)
- Education: University of Western Australia
- Occupation: Economist

John Sydney "Joe" Dawkins AO (born 2 March 1947) is an Australian former politician who was Treasurer in the Keating Labor government from December 1991 to December 1993. He is notable for his reforms of tertiary education as Minister for Employment, Education and Training, his period as Treasurer when he attempted to increase taxes in order to balance the budget and his abrupt exit from politics.

== Early life ==
Dawkins was born in Perth on 2 March 1947. He is the son of Muriel (née Lee Steere) and Alec Letts Dawkins. His father, originally from Adelaide, was an orthopaedic surgeon and military physician during World War II with the rank of brigadier. His maternal grandfather Sir Ernest Augustus Lee Steere was a prominent pastoralist and businessman in Western Australia, while his uncle Sir Ernest Henry Lee-Steere served as Lord Mayor of Perth in the 1970s.

Dawkins attended primary school in Cottesloe and went on to attend Scotch College, Perth. After leaving school he moved to South Australia to attend Roseworthy Agricultural College, graduating with a diploma in agriculture in 1968. He later studied economics at the University of Western Australia, graduating Bachelor of Economics in 1972 with a concentration in agricultural economics. Before entering parliament he worked for periods as a public servant and union secretary. He worked briefly for the Bureau of Agricultural Economics and with the Department of Trade and Industry from 1971 to 1972.

== Political career ==
=== Early involvement ===
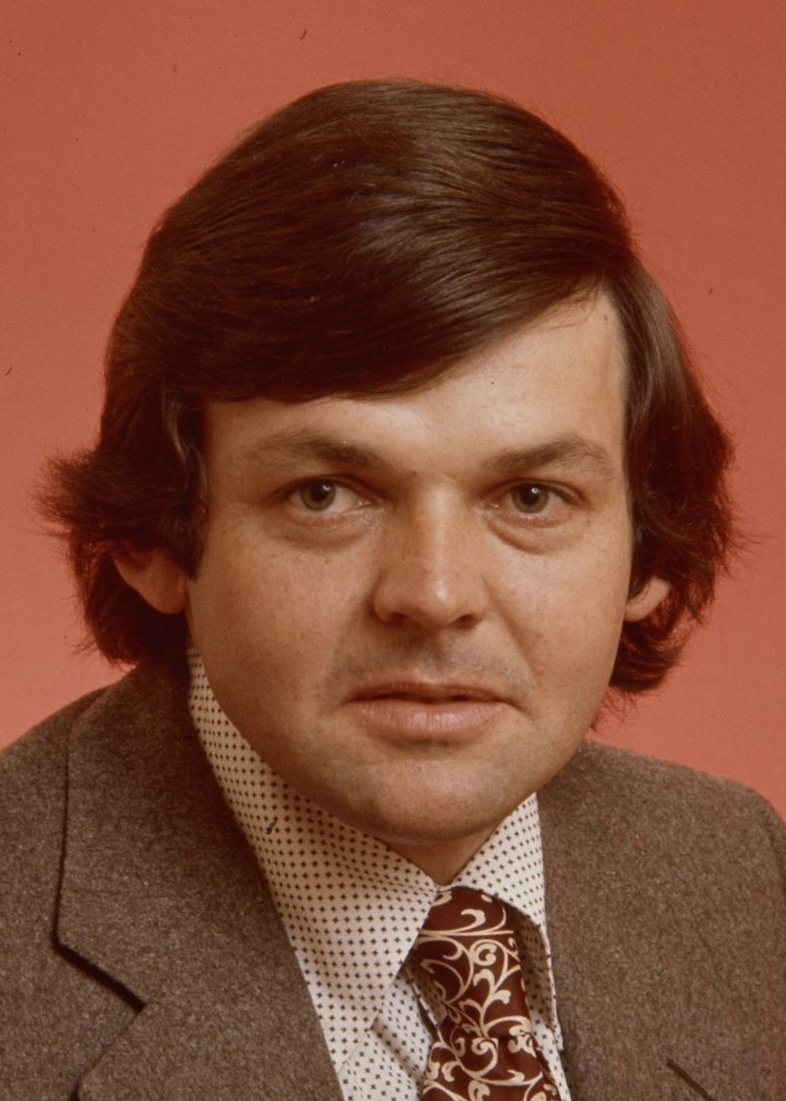
Dawkins in 1974

Dawkins joined the Australian Labor Party while a student. He first stood for parliament at the 1971 Western Australian state election, aged 23, running unsuccessfully for the Western Australian Legislative Council in Lower West Province.

Dawkins was elected to the House of Representatives at the 1974 federal election, winning the newly created seat of Tangney for the ALP. He was defeated at the 1975 election by Liberal Peter Richardson.

In 1977 Dawkins returned to the House as member for the safe Labor seat of Fremantle, succeeding Kim Beazley (senior), and defeating his son, Kim Beazley, for the Labor preselection. In 1980 he was promoted to the Opposition front bench and was Shadow Education Minister from 1980 to 1983.

=== Hawke government ===
Dawkins became Minister for Finance following the election of the first Hawke government in 1983. In the second Hawke Ministry (1984–1987) he was Minister for Trade. From 1987 to 1991 he was Minister for Employment, Education and Training. It was in this position where he brought in a series of reforms of the higher education sector, which included expansion of Australian universities, the forced mergers of universities and colleges of advanced education, and the re-introduction of university fees (abolished by Kim Beazley senior in 1973) in the form of the HECS. This later became known as the Dawkins Revolution and aroused bitter opposition among academics and university administrators. In June 1991 Treasurer Paul Keating resigned after launching an unsuccessful leadership challenge against Prime Minister Bob Hawke. Dawkins was a minister who was qualified to become the new Treasurer but he supported Keating in the leadership challenge and the position went instead to John Kerin. Hawke had in fact been impressed with Dawkins' work as a Minister and is believed Hawke would have appointed Dawkins as Treasurer if Dawkins had not supported Keating.

=== Keating government ===
A key supporter of Paul Keating, Dawkins became Treasurer following Keating's unseating of Hawke as ALP leader and Prime Minister, in his second and successful leadership challenge in December 1991. After Keating's unexpected victory in the 1993 federal election, Dawkins brought down a budget which contained a series of highly unpopular revenue measures which were seen as an attack on Labor's traditional supporters. The Cabinet, which had hitherto grudgingly accepted Keating's neo-liberal policies, rebelled against the Dawkins budget. Dawkins did not help his stock when he taunted Liberal MP Kathy Sullivan by calling her "sweetheart", angering several female MPs from his own party.

In December 1993 Dawkins, frustrated at what he saw as the lack of economic realism of his colleagues, suddenly announced his resignation, and quit politics altogether soon after. It was during his farewell speech that he suggested that the date of presenting the Budget be moved from August to May, a practice that would be started by his successor Ralph Willis in May 1994. He was succeeded in Fremantle by former West Australian Premier Dr Carmen Lawrence.

== Post political career ==
Since leaving politics, Dawkins has had an active business career. He has been non-executive Chair of Elders Rural Bank, LawCentral, Integrated Legal Holdings, The Retail Energy Market Company which operates the retail gas markets in South Australia and Western Australia, Fortuna Funds Management and director of Cbus superannuation, Genetic Technologies and MGM Wireless.

In 2000 he was a made an Officer of the Order of Australia for service to the reform of international trade as foundation Chairman of the Cairns Group, to the reform of the federal budget, education and training, and to the Australian Parliament.

In 2000, Dawkins's family agreed to use 104 hectares of their sizeable holdings of grazing land in Forrestdale outside Perth in a property venture where the profits from land sales would be invested in research and development for technology that is conducted at the CY O'Connor ERADE Village, including research laboratories, offices and accommodation, at the entrance of the twelve hectare estate. The development was believed to be worth around $100 million.

His principal employment was as Director of Government Relations Australia, now GRACosway, a lobbying firm. He has also worked as a consultant to large Australian and foreign companies and the World Bank and the OECD. He has been awarded honorary doctorates from the University of South Australia, Federation University Australia and the Queensland University of Technology.

He was board chairman of Sovereign Gold Limited until December 2015.

In 2013 Dawkins was chairman of Vocation and earned over a million dollars when it listed on the stock exchange. The company collapsed in 2015 and Dawkins had civil proceedings from the Australian Securities and Investments Commission regarding claimed contravention of disclosure provisions. In November 2019, the judgement against Dawkins and two senior executives resulted in him being disqualified from holding directorships for two years, and fined A$25,000.

== Personal life ==
A cousin of the same name, John Dawkins, served as the independent President of the South Australian Legislative Council from 2020 to 2022. His nephew Aussie Trump served as member of the Western Australian Legislative Council from 2023 to 2025.

Dawkins is married to Maggie Maruff, the daughter of tea-grower Allan Maruff. Their daughter Alice nominated for Labor preselection for Mayo in 2018 and Spence in 2021. Dawkins has a son and daughter with his first wife Kate, and a step-child from Maggie's first marriage.

The Dawkins family moved to a property near Eden Valley near the Barossa Valley.

Political offices
Preceded by Margaret Guilfoyle	Minister for Finance; 1983–1984	Succeeded by Peter Walsh
Preceded by Lionel Bowen	Minister for Trade; 1984–1987	Succeeded by Michael Duffy
Preceded by Susan Ryan	Minister for Employment, Education and Training; 1987–1991	Succeeded by Kim Beazley
Preceded by Ralph Willis	Treasurer; 1991–1993	Succeeded by Ralph Willis
Parliament of Australia
Preceded by None	Member for Tangney; 1974–1975	Succeeded by Peter Richardson
Preceded by Kim Beazley (senior)	Member for Fremantle; 1977–1994	Succeeded by Carmen Lawrence
