= Zaneta Mascarenhas =

Australian politician (born 1980)

Zaneta Mascarenhas MP

Member of the Australian Parliament for Swan
- Incumbent
- Assumed office 21 May 2022
- Preceded by: Steve Irons

Personal details
- Born: Zaneta Felice Antoinetta Mascarenhas; 26 July 1980 (age 46) Kalgoorlie, Western Australia, Australia
- Party: Labor
- Children: 2
- Education: John Paul College, Kalgoorlie; Curtin University
- Occupation: Engineer
- Website: zanetamascarenhas.com.au

Zaneta Felice Antoinetta Mascarenhas (/zəˈniːtə ˌmæskəˈreɪnəs/ zə-NEE-tə MASS-kə-RAY-nəs; born 26 July 1980) is an Australian politician and engineer. She was elected to the Australian House of Representatives at the 2022 Australian federal election for the Division of Swan.

== Early life and career ==
Zaneta Felice Antoinetta Mascarenhas was born on 26 July 1980 in Kalgoorlie, Western Australia, to Indian immigrant parents of Goan descent who migrated from Kenya. She grew up in Kambalda and attended John Paul College in Kalgoorlie. She studied science and engineering at Curtin University in Perth where she became President of the Student Guild as well as becoming the President of the National Union of Students WA State Branch. She worked as an engineer for 15 years in Western Australia and Victoria, including as a FIFO engineer. She worked in climate change action for 12 years, where she helped ASX 200 companies with decarbonisation. She also volunteered for The Climate Reality Project.

== Political career ==
Mascarenhas contested the Labor Party preselection for the Division of Swan for the 2019 Australian federal election, but withdrew, enabling Hannah Beazley to be preselected. Mascarenhas is part of the Labor Left faction of the Labor Party, and she is supported by the Australian Manufacturing Workers' Union. In June 2021, she beat Fiona Reid to win preselection for Swan at the 2022 Australian federal election.

At the 2022 election on 21 May, Mascarenhas won the Division of Swan, succeeding retiring Liberal Party politician Steve Irons and defeating his party's candidate Kristy McSweeney. She is the first person of Goan origin to be elected to Australia's House of Representatives.

== Personal life ==
Mascarenhas lives in East Victoria Park with her husband and two children. She speaks Bangla and Konkani.

Parliament of Australia
Preceded by Steve Irons	Member for Swan; 2022–present	Incumbent
