= Peter Richardson (politician) =

Australian politician

Dr Peter Richardson

Member of the Australian Parliament for Tangney
- In office 13 December 1975 – 10 November 1977
- Preceded by: John Dawkins
- Succeeded by: Peter Shack

Personal details
- Born: 23 January 1939 (age 87) Perth, Western Australia
- Party: Liberal (1975–77); Progress (1977)
- Education: University of Western Australia
- Occupation: Gynaecologist

Peter Anthony Richardson (born 23 January 1939) is an Australian doctor and former politician. He was a member of the House of Representatives from 1975 to 1977, representing the Division of Tangney. He was elected as a member of the Liberal Party, but shortly before the 1977 federal election defected to the libertarian Progress Party and was an unsuccessful candidate for the Senate.

== Early life ==
Richardson was born in Perth, Western Australia, and graduated from the University of Western Australia in 1963. He trained at King Edward Memorial Hospital for Women, Fremantle Hospital, and the Royal Hospital for Women, qualifying as a member of the Royal College of Obstetricians and Gynaecologists. From 1968 to 1970 he worked in England as a senior registrar at St Luke's Hospital, Guildford, and as a consultant to the Welsh Hospital Board. He also undertook further training in laparoscopy and ultrasound, under Patrick Steptoe and Ian Donald respectively. Richardson worked in New York from 1970 to 1972 before returning to Perth in 1973.

== Politics ==
Richardson was elected to the House of Representatives at the 1975 federal election, standing for the Liberal Party in the Division of Tangney. He won the seat from John Dawkins of the Labor Party. He came into conflict with the Waterside Workers' Federation in January 1977, when he criticised workers for delaying the departure of the Antarctic supply ship MV Nella Dan by refusing to work in hot weather.

In September 1977, Richardson announced that he would quit politics after a single term, citing the government's failure to keep its election promises and its decision to close the Rhodesia Information Centre in Sydney. However, on 13 October he instead announced that he had defected to the Progress Party, a small libertarian party, and would be its lead Senate candidate in Western Australia at the 1977 federal election. He stated that he would stand for a "limited government platform, decentralisation and devolution of power from Canberra, and a true private-enterprise economy". His campaign for the Senate was unsuccessful, as the party polled just over 10,000 votes or 1.7 percent of the state total.

== Later career ==
Richardson returned to medicine after leaving politics, specialising in high-risk obstetrics and gynaecology and later in assisted reproductive technology. He held consultant and teaching appointments at Fremantle Hospital from 1986 to 1991. He later served as chairman of the National Association of Specialist Obstetricians and Gynaecologists (1991–1995) and national president of the Australian Association of Ambulatory Vaginal and Incontinence Surgeons (1995–2000). In 2010, Richardson joined Central Queensland University as an adjunct professor in the School of Medical and Applied Sciences.

Parliament of Australia
Preceded by John Dawkins	Member for Tangney; 1975 – 1977	Succeeded by Peter Shack
