= Daryl Williams (politician) =

Australian politician

The Honourable Daryl Williams AM, KC

Attorney-General of Australia
- In office 11 March 1996 – 7 October 2003
- Prime Minister: John Howard
- Preceded by: Michael Lavarch
- Succeeded by: Philip Ruddock

Member of the Australian Parliament for Tangney
- In office 13 March 1993 – 31 August 2004
- Preceded by: Peter Shack
- Succeeded by: Dennis Jensen

Personal details
- Born: 21 August 1942 (age 84) East Fremantle, Western Australia, Australia
- Party: Liberal
- Education: Perth Modern School
- Alma mater: University of Western Australia; Wadham College, Oxford

Daryl Robert Williams AM, KC (born 21 August 1942) is a former Australian politician who was a member of the House of Representatives from 1993 to 2004, representing the Liberal Party. He was Attorney-General in the Howard government from 1996 to 2003.

== Background and early career ==
Williams was born in East Fremantle, Western Australia, and was educated at Richmond School, East Fremantle, and Perth Modern School. He went on to the University of Western Australia and Wadham College, Oxford, where he was a Rhodes Scholar in 1965.

In 1968, Williams started work as a barrister. In 1971, he became counsel for the Asian Development Bank. However, four years later, he returned to practising law on his own. He was appointed Queen's Counsel in 1982, and became a Member of the Order of Australia in 1989. Williams continued to practise law until his election to parliament in 1993.

== Political career ==
Williams was briefly a member of the Opposition Shadow Ministry in 1994, serving as Shadow Attorney-General and Shadow Minister Assisting the Leader of the Opposition on Constitutional Reform.

In 1996, when the Liberal Party won office, he was appointed Attorney-General first as a member of the outer ministry and then as a member of Cabinet from October 1997. He served in this capacity until 2003, serving the longest continuous term in the position since Herbert Evatt (1941–49). Williams was also Minister for Justice for a period in 1996–97. He attended the 1998 Constitutional Convention as a parliamentary delegate.

After the Liberal ministerial shakeup of 2003, Williams was appointed Minister for Communications, Information Technology and the Arts. In April 2004, he announced he would not be contesting the 2004 election. He stood down from the ministry in July 2004.

== Post-political career ==
Williams was seriously considered as a candidate to replace Justice Mary Gaudron as a judge of the High Court of Australia in 2003, and was the nominee of the Western Australian Law Society for the post. Dyson Heydon was eventually appointed to the post. Williams was also considered a possible candidate for appointment to the High Court prior to the retirement of Justice Michael McHugh in 2005, following his retirement from politics. Susan Crennan was eventually appointed as McHugh's replacement. In addition, Williams has been mooted as a contender for appointment as Chief Justice of the Family Court of Australia, a Justice of the Federal Court of Australia, the Supreme Court of Western Australia, or the Court of Appeal of Western Australia.

Political offices
Preceded by Michael Lavarch	Attorney-General; 1996–2003	Succeeded by Philip Ruddock
Preceded by Duncan Kerr	Minister for Justice; 1996–1997	Succeeded by Amanda Vanstone
Preceded by Richard Alston	Minister for Communications, Information Technology and the Arts; 2003–2004	Succeeded by Helen Coonan
Parliament of Australia
Preceded by Peter Shack	Member for Tangney; 1993–2004	Succeeded by Dennis Jensen
