= Sam Lim =

Australian politician (born 1961)

Sam Lim MP

Member of the Australian Parliament for Tangney
- Incumbent
- Assumed office 21 May 2022
- Preceded by: Ben Morton

Personal details
- Born: Bon Cheng Lim; 6 June 1961 (age 65) Muar, Johor, Federation of Malaya
- Citizenship: Australia (2008–present); Malaysia (until 2021)
- Party: Australian Labor Party
- Children: 3
- Occupation: Dolphin trainer; police officer
- Website: www.samlim.com.au
- Police career
- Allegiance: Western Australia
- Department: Western Australia Police Force
- Branch: Community and Coordination, Community Engagement Division
- Service years: 2006–2022
- Rank: Senior Constable
- Awards: Officer of the Year, WA Police Excellence Awards (2020)

Bon Cheng Lim (Chinese: 林文清; born 6 June 1961), better known as Sam Lim, is a Malaysian-born Australian politician. Lim was elected to the Australian House of Representatives as member of the Australian Labor Party (ALP) in 2022 to represent the Division of Tangney in Western Australia. He held the seat in the 2025 election.

== Biography ==
Lim was born on 6 June 1961 in Muar in the Federation of Malaya, the eldest of eight siblings in a Malayan Chinese family. He lived for 15 years in a house with almost no electricity, no floor, and a leaking roof. His childhood dream was to be a policeman, so he became a constable in the Royal Malaysia Police in the 1980s after completing his Malaysian Certificate Examination. However, the low pay rates and weak state of the Malaysian ringgit meant that he could not share his income with his parents. Instead, after two years with the police, he worked as a dolphin trainer at a safari park in Johor for five years, a job that Lim described as his "best job ever". The safari park closed down later, and Lim moved into small business.

Lim decided to leave Malaysia and emigrate to Australia in 2005, planning to retire with his family. Shortly after his move in 2006 however, Lim abandoned his plans to retire and continued his police dream by joining the Western Australia Police Force. During his time in the police force, he worked in Perth, Karratha, Eucla and Fremantle. He was later transferred to the department's Perth headquarters in 2017, and was handed the responsibility of assisting multicultural Asian groups. He was awarded Officer of the Year at the Nine News Police Excellence Awards in December 2020 for his role in pandemic outreach through translating COVID-19 announcements for multiple communities.

Lim speaks ten languages, including Malay, Mandarin Chinese and Indonesian. He is part of the Labor Right faction, which is more economically and socially conservative.

In the 2025 Australian Federal Election, he was re-elected as the Federal Member for Tangney.

Parliament of Australia
Preceded by Ben Morton	Member for Tangney; 2022–present	Incumbent
