= Peter Shack =

Australian politician

Member of the Australian Parliament for Tangney
- In office 10 December 1977 – 5 March 1983
- Preceded by: Peter Richardson
- Succeeded by: George Gear
- In office 1 December 1984 – 8 February 1993
- Preceded by: George Gear
- Succeeded by: Daryl Williams

Personal details
- Born: Peter Donald Shack; 20 June 1953 (age 73) Perth, Western Australia, Australia
- Party: Liberal
- Spouse: Rebecca Clough
- Education: University of Western Australia
- Occupation: Company director

Peter Donald Shack (born 20 June 1953) is a former Australian politician who served as a member of the House of Representatives from 1977 to 1983 and from 1984 to 1993. He was a member of the Liberal Party and represented the Division of Tangney in Western Australia.

== Early life ==
Shack was born in Perth, Western Australia. He is a descendant of Heinrich Schacht, who immigrated to Australia in 1860s from the German-Danish border region of Schleswig-Holstein; another of Heinrich Schacht's descendants was Labor Senator Chris Schacht. Shack was educated at Wesley College, Perth and the University of Western Australia before becoming a company director and political advisor.

== Politics ==
In 1977, aged 24, Shack was elected to the House of Representatives as the Liberal member for Tangney. He was defeated by Labor's George Gear in 1983. However, a redistribution for the 1984 election made Tangney notionally Liberal, forcing Gear to transfer to nearby Canning. Shack ran for his old seat in that election and won it with a large swing. He held the seat without serious difficulty until his retirement in 1993.

== Criminal conviction ==
In January 2013, Shack was convicted of stealing $100,000 from his mother-in-law Mary Stasinowsky in July 2004. On 26 April he was sentenced to 14 months imprisonment.

Parliament of Australia
Preceded by Peter Richardson	Member for Tangney; 1977 – 1983	Succeeded by George Gear
Preceded by George Gear	Member for Tangney; 1984 – 1993	Succeeded by Daryl Williams
