= Spacetalk =

Australian technology company

- Type: Public company
- Traded as: ASX: SPA
- Industry: Information technology
- Founded: 2001
- Headquarters: Adelaide, South Australia, Australia
- Area served: Australia, United Kingdom, New Zealand, United States
- Key people: Simon Crowther (CEO) and Georg Chmiel (Non-Executive Chairman)
- Revenue: A$17.5 million (2024)
- Website: spacetalk.co

Spacetalk Limited is an Australian technology company that specializes in wearable technology, software, and virtual mobile network operator services designed for family safety and connectivity. It is a public company listed on the Australian Securities Exchange (ASX: SPA).

== History ==
The company was founded in 2001 as MGM Wireless to provide a school-to-home text messaging service. The company launched its Spacetalk brand of family location and child safety wearable devices in 2017 and was itself rebranded as Spacetalk in 2020. Cofounder and long-time CEO Mark Fortunatow left the company and was replaced in February 2023 by new CEO and Managing Director Simon Crowther, formerly of Nearmap. In July 2025, Spacetalk said it had secured $3 million in new funding and a commitment from its lender to reduce its debt by $1M.

== Products and Services ==
Spacetalk's product ecosystem includes:

- Spacetalk App: A free, ad-free app for locating family members that has over 500,000 downloads. The company launched its new mobile app in November 2026, with subscription plans that do not require a watch.
- Kids Smartwatches: Give parents a tool to protect and communicate with their children without access to social media or requiring a phone.
- Spacetalk Mobile: Wearable-focused mobile plans for children and phone plans for older users.
- Adult Wearables: mPERS Smartwatches for seniors featuring 4G connectivity, fall detection, GPS/Wi-Fi/mobile location tracking, step counting, and mobile personal emergency alerts.
- Spacetalk Schools: An attendance and communication platform used by 10% of Australian schools, connecting with over 620,000 parents monthly.
