= Steve Irons =

Australian politician (born 1958)

The Honourable Steve Irons MP

Member of the Australian Parliament for Swan
- In office 24 November 2007 – 11 April 2022
- Preceded by: Kim Wilkie
- Succeeded by: Zaneta Mascarenhas

Assistant Minister for Vocational Education and Skills
- In office 29 May 2019 – 22 December 2020
- Prime Minister: Scott Morrison
- Preceded by: Karen Andrews
- Succeeded by: Office abolished

Assistant Minister to the Prime Minister
- In office 28 August 2018 – 29 May 2019
- Prime Minister: Scott Morrison
- Preceded by: James McGrath
- Succeeded by: Ben Morton

Personal details
- Born: Stephen James Irons; 1 September 1958 (age 68) Melbourne, Victoria, Australia
- Party: Liberal Party of Australia
- Spouse: Cheryle Irons (m. 2011)
- Children: Jarrad Irons

Stephen James Irons (born 1 September 1958) is an Australian politician. He was the Liberal member of the Australian House of Representatives representing the electoral Division of Swan in Western Australia from the 2007 federal election to his retirement at the 2022 federal election.

== Early life ==
Irons was raised in the Melbourne suburb of Box Hill North. Irons was the sixth of ten children in the Dix family; and when he was six months old he was placed into an orphanage in Camberwell. Irons was fostered at age three by the Irons family who had recently migrated from South Africa. Irons' foster father was a church minister in South Africa and a social worker within mostly State and Local Council organisations in Victoria, and his foster mother worked as a social worker within medical institutions and Charity organisations in Melbourne. Irons grew up with his foster family until moving to Perth. Irons completed an apprenticeship as an electrician after completing his high school education in Melbourne.

Irons moved to Perth in 1981 to play Australian Rules Football for East Perth in the West Australian Football League. He began working at an air conditioning company located in Lord St East Perth, while playing for East Perth. In 1996, he became the owner of the company.

== Parliamentary career ==
Irons was the only Liberal in Australia to defeat a sitting Labor MP at the 2007 election, defeating Kim Wilkie by a margin of 0.19 percent on a two-party-preferred basis.

Since his election in 2007, Irons has sat on a large number of Parliamentary Committees and was a member of the Speaker's panel from 2015 until 2018.

Following the election of Scott Morrison as Liberal Leader and thus Prime Minister of Australia, Irons was elevated to the Ministry as Assistant Minister to the Prime Minister in August 2018.

While campaigning for the 2019 election, Irons was approached outside his electorate office and asked how many times he voted to cut penalty rates. Irons confronted the Unionists, who had allegedly sworn at his wife, saying that with regards to a bill that was introduced to Parliament for mandatory sentencing of convicted sex offenders that unlike the Labor party he did not vote for "paedophiles, sex offenders and rapists" against the bill.

Following the 2019 election, Irons was sworn in as the assistant minister for vocational education, training and apprenticeships.

Irons pulled out of the preselection process for the seat of Swan prior to the 2022 Australian federal election. Sky News commentator Kristy McSweeney was endorsed as the Liberal party candidate for his seat, unopposed. The move by the Liberal party to not restart the preselection process when Irons pulled out was criticised by other preselection hopefuls, who would have run for preselection had Irons pulled out earlier.

=== Issues ===
Irons is a member of the centre-right faction of the Liberal Party.

In his maiden speech to Parliament, Irons noted that he wanted a national focus on the forgotten Australians and former child migrants, and on forced adoption. He worked with both sides of the house in the national apology to Forgotten Australians and Former Child Migrants on 16 November 2009, and on the National Apology for forced adoptions. Irons was among the first to call for a royal commission into institutional child sexual abuse. In 2018 Irons called for the introduction of the death penalty for paedophiles and "people who continually abuse children".

== Personal life ==
His son Jarrad Irons played Australian rules football for Port Adelaide in the Australian Football League (AFL). However, Irons supports the West Coast Eagles in the AFL.

On 21 October 2011, Irons married Cheryle Street, then a Melbourne-based real estate agent.

In October 2015, Irons pleaded guilty to a case of driving with a blood alcohol reading of 0.069. He was served with a good behaviour order.

In December 2015, Irons billed the taxpayers for him to attend an amateur golf tournament at the Gold Coast even though his electorate is in Western Australia. His wife also attended the tournament, which was also billed to the taxpayer to the value of around $4000. Irons denied any wrongdoing.

In 2016, 5 years after the event, the media revealed that Irons charged his wedding flight to the taxpayers in 2011. Irons paid the charge back in early 2013.

== See also ==
- Forgotten Australians
- Royal Commission into Institutional Responses to Child Sexual Abuse

Parliament of Australia
Preceded by Kim Wilkie	Member for Swan; 2007–2022	Succeeded by Zaneta Mascarenhas
