= Ben Morton (politician) =

Australian politician

The Honourable Ben Morton
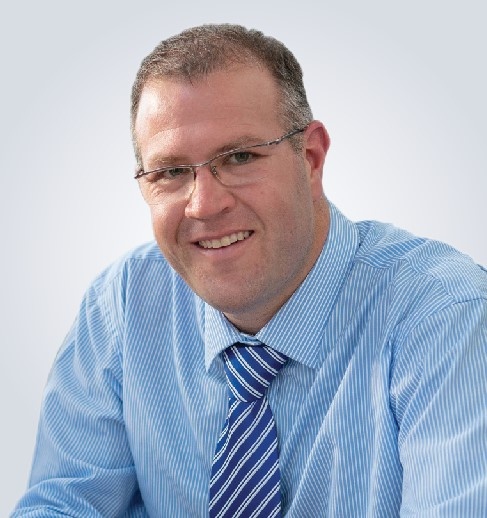
- Morton in 2019

Minister for the Public Service
- In office 8 October 2021 – 23 May 2022
- Prime Minister: Scott Morrison
- Preceded by: Scott Morrison
- Succeeded by: Katy Gallagher

Special Minister of State
- In office 8 October 2021 – 23 May 2022
- Prime Minister: Scott Morrison
- Preceded by: Simon Birmingham
- Succeeded by: Don Farrell

Member of the Australian Parliament for Tangney
- In office 2 July 2016 – 21 May 2022
- Preceded by: Dennis Jensen
- Succeeded by: Sam Lim

Personal details
- Born: 29 June 1981 (age 45) Gosford, New South Wales, Australia
- Party: Liberal Party of Australia
- Spouse: Asta Morton (wife)
- Relations: Trevor Morton; Linda Morton (deceased)
- Children: 2
- Education: Bachelor of Arts, Australian National University
- Alma mater: Australian National University
- Occupation: Bus driver, senior manager
- Website: www.benmorton.net.au

Ben Morton (born 29 June 1981) is an Australian former politician. He represented the Australian House of Representatives seat of Tangney for the Liberal Party from 2 July 2016 until he lost the seat at the 2022 Australian federal election. Morton served as Assistant Minister to the Prime Minister and Cabinet from 2019 to 2020, Assistant Minister to the Minister for the Public Service and Assistant Minister for Electoral Matters from 2020 to 2021, and Minister for the Public Service and Special Minister of State from 2021 to 2022.

In 2021, Morton was also appointed to administer the Home Affairs department, apparently without the knowledge of the minister for that department (in which he did not eventually perform any duties), who was also unaware that prime minister Scott Morrison had secretly also been appointed as minister for Home Affairs.

== Early life and education ==
Morton was born in Gosford, in the Central Coast of New South Wales and spent his early years in Wyong. He attended and completed his high school education at Wyong Technology High School, prior to enrolling in the Australian National University to complete a Bachelor of Arts. Morton stated that in high school he was "not the most Academic kid".

He then returned to his home town and unsuccessfully stood for election as the Liberal Party candidate in the safe Labor seat of Wyong in 2003 and 2007.

== Career ==
In 2001 Morton became employed as a school bus driver for Deane's Buslines Queanbeyan (NSW), a bus coach and hire company, but later switched to drive for Coastal Liner Coaches from 2002 to 2003. The next year, he transitioned to working as an adviser to the Federal Government under John Howard until 2007 before returning to his previous profession as a bus driver for Deane's Buslines. Morton switched professions once more in 2008 to attain the position of State Director of the Liberal Party (WA), which he retained until 2015. Directly prior to representing the federal division of Tangney he worked as a senior manager at one of Australia's largest home builders, Buckeridge Group of Companies (BGC) from 2015 to 2016.

=== Political career ===
At the 2016 federal election, Morton successfully ran as the Liberal candidate against sitting member Dennis Jensen, who had been disendorsed by the Liberals and was running as an independent.

Morton was appointed as Assistant Minister to the Prime Minister and the Cabinet from 29 May 2019, which includes a duty of responding on behalf of the Prime Minister regarding the National Cabinet. Relating to this position, Morton has pointed out infrastructure as a primary issue.

On 6 April 2020, Morton was temporarily appointed the responsibilities of Assistant Public Service Minister by Prime Minister Scott Morrison. As of 22 December 2020, Morton has been appointed Assistant Minister for Electoral Matters and Assistant Minister for the Public Service.

Morton has previously held multiple committee standings, including a chairing the Joint Standing for Electoral Matters in the National Capital and External Territories from 9 February 2017 to 1 July 2019. He also served on the House of Representatives Standing Committee for Social Policy and Legal Affairs from 14 September 2016 until 9 February 2017. Lastly, he was a part of the House of Representatives Select Committee on Intergenerational Welfare Dependence from 28 June 2018 to 2 April 2019.

Morton currently holds two party positions, Member of the Liberal Party Applecross Branch (WA) and Member of the Liberal Party Wyong and District Branch (NSW). He previously held the position of State Director of the Liberal Party State Branch (WA) in 2008 until 2015, which is now led by David Honey.

Morton was Minister for the Public Service and Special Minister of State from 8 October 2021 until May 2022, following the appointment of the Albanese ministry, and Morton's own defeat as an MP.

==== Political views ====
Morton is a member of the centre-right faction of the Liberal Party.

As a member of parliament, Morton votes on the behalf of the Division of Tangney and in affiliation with the Liberal Party of Australia. Since entering parliament in July 2016, he has always voted on party lines and never crossed the floor.

Morton has voted on some topics where a party line was not enforced during his service, including for the issue of holding a plebiscite national vote legalising same-sex marriage in Australia (Plebiscite (Same-Sex Marriage) Bill 2016), from which result led to the legalisation of same-sex marriage in Australia. On the same note, he has also voted in support of the Marriage Amendment (Definition and Religious Freedoms) Bill 2017 for protecting the right of celebrants to refuse marrying same-sex couples if doing so opposes their own religious or conscientious beliefs. Morton was personally opposed to legalising same sex marriage, but committed to vote in favour of it if it was endorsed in the 2017 same sex marriage postal survey.

Morton did not vote on the outcome of the federal independent commission for anti-corruption.

== Personal life ==
Morton is the son of Trevor and Linda Morton. Morton's mother died from cancer in December 2015. His mother immigrated to Australia from England after World War II with her previous husband and Morton's two brothers. His father's family had history in farming pulpwood, citrus, and dairy in the Dooralong Valley, near to where Morton was raised.

Parliament of Australia
Preceded by Dennis Jensen	Member for Tangney; 2016–2022	Succeeded by Sam Lim
