= Division of Tangney =

Australian federal electoral division

Coordinates: 32.053°S 115.869°E

Tangney Australian House of Representatives Division
- Interactive map of electorate boundaries from the 2025 federal election
- Created: 1974
- MP: Sam Lim
- Party: Australian Labor Party
- Namesake: Dame Dorothy Tangney
- Electors: 122,303 (2022)
- Area: 83 km^{2} (32.0 sq mi)
- Demographic: Inner metropolitan
Electorates around Tangney:
Curtin	Swan	Swan
Fremantle	Tangney	Burt
Fremantle	Fremantle	Burt

The Division of Tangney is an Australian electoral division in the state of Western Australia. The Division was named after Dame Dorothy Tangney, the first female member of the Australian Senate.

Tangney is an affluent electorate covering the southern shores of the Swan and Canning rivers, divided by the Kwinana Freeway. It extends from Bicton to Riverton and Ferndale and as far south as Murdoch, Leeming and Canning Vale. Tangney covers 102 square kilometres (39 sq mi).

From the 1980s to 2022 it was considered a safe Liberal seat and in 2022 was held by Ben Morton, a former state director of the Liberal Party. In the 2022 Australian federal election, Sam Lim, the Labor candidate garnered a 10.4 per cent swing against the sitting member to deliver Tangney to the ALP for the first time since 1983.

== History ==
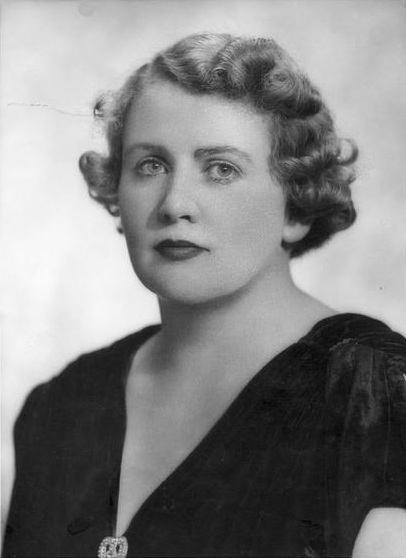
Dame Dorothy Tangney, the division's namesake

Tangney was established at the Western Australia redistribution of 19 April 1974 and was first contested at the 1974 election. Before the 1984 redistribution, the electorate included the traditional Labor areas of Spearwood and Gosnells, and was a bellwether seat for the party in government. After 1984, the seat received its present borders. For most of the next three decades, it was a safe Liberal seat.

It was first held by John Dawkins, later a Treasurer of Australia (as Member for Fremantle), and was held from 1993 until 2004 by Daryl Williams, former Attorney-General of Australia and Rhodes Scholar.

The seat briefly made national headlines in August 2006 when Matt Brown, once a chief-of-staff to former Defence Minister Robert Hill, defeated incumbent Dennis Jensen for preselection, despite support for the latter from John Howard. However, on 7 October 2006, the decision was overturned by the Liberals' Western Australian state council and Jensen was once again confirmed as the candidate for the 2007 election.

Jensen lost Liberal preselection in Tangney for the 2016 federal election. Announced on 3 April 2016, it was revealed he had written an unpublished book that included a sex scene, subsequently published as an e-book. Former party state director Ben Morton won preselection. On 2 July 2016 Ben Morton won the Tangney seat with 61.5% of the vote, losing 1.5% towards the Labor Party.

A redistribution ahead of the 2022 federal election slightly pared back the Liberal margin to 9.5 percent. At that election, Morton lost over 10.5 percent of his primary vote, and Labor candidate and former police officer Sam Lim defeated Morton on Green preferences. Lim picked up a swing of over 11 percent amid the Liberals' collapse in Western Australia. The loss of the seat has also been attributed to the notably large swings against the Liberals among Chinese Australian voters, which cost the Liberals many key seats; approximately one in ten of the electorate's voters possessed Chinese ancestry.

In the 2025 Federal Election, Sam Lim (Labor Member for Tangney) was up against Liberal candidate Howard Ong. On May 3rd 2025, Sam Lim was called the winner had a primary vote of 42.5% and had increased his primary vote since 2022 by 4.3%. Howard Ong had received 34.2% of the primary vote. The TTP (two party preferred) was 57.0% to Sam Lim and 43.0% to Howard Ong. After post-election analysis, Tangney has been labeled a fairly safe Labor seat.

== Geography ==
Since 1984, federal electoral division boundaries in Australia have been determined at redistributions by a redistribution committee appointed by the Australian Electoral Commission. Redistributions occur for the boundaries of divisions in a particular state, and they occur every seven years, or sooner if a state's representation entitlement changes or when divisions of a state are malapportioned.

In August 2021, the Australian Electoral Commission (AEC) announced Tangney would gain the Canning suburb of Wilson from the seat of Swan and the Canning-Gosnells suburb of Canning Vale from the seat of Burt. These boundary changes took place at the 2022 election.

The seat presently contains most of the City of Melville, a part of the City of Canning and a small portion of the City of Cockburn and is located south of the Swan and Canning rivers. Suburbs presently included are:

City of Melville

- Alfred Cove
- Applecross
- Ardross
- Attadale
- Bateman
- Bicton
- Booragoon
- Brentwood
- Bull Creek
- Kardinya (part)
- Leeming (part)
- Melville
- Mount Pleasant
- Murdoch
- Myaree
- Willagee
- Winthrop

City of Canning

- Canning Vale
- Ferndale
- Lynwood
- Parkwood
- Riverton
- Rossmoyne
- Shelley
- Willetton
- Wilson

City of Cockburn

- Leeming (part)

== Members ==
Image	Member	Party	Term	Notes
	John Dawkins (1947–)	Labor	18 May 1974 – 13 December 1975	Lost seat. Later elected to the Division of Fremantle in 1977
	Peter Richardson (1939–)	Liberal	13 December 1975 – 13 October 1977	Did not contest in 1977. Failed to win a Senate seat
	Peter Richardson (1939–)	Progress	13 October 1977 – 10 November 1977	Did not contest in 1977. Failed to win a Senate seat
	Peter Shack (1953–)	Liberal	10 November 1977 – 5 March 1983	Lost seat
	George Gear (1947–)	Labor	5 March 1983 – 1 December 1984	Transferred to the Division of Canning
	Peter Shack (1953–)	Liberal	1 December 1984 – 8 February 1993	Retired
	Daryl Williams (1942–)	Liberal	13 March 1993 – 31 August 2004	Served as minister under Howard. Retired
	Dennis Jensen (1962–)	Liberal	9 October 2004 – 9 May 2016	Lost preselection and then lost seat
	Dennis Jensen (1962–)	Independent	9 May 2016 – 2 July 2016	Lost preselection and then lost seat
	Ben Morton (1981–)	Liberal	2 July 2016 – 21 May 2022	Served as minister under Morrison. Lost seat
	Sam Lim (1961–)	Labor	21 May 2022 – present	Incumbent

== Election results ==
2025 Australian federal election: Tangney
Party	Candidate	Votes	%	±%
Labor	Sam Lim	47,175	42.50	+4.35
Liberal	Howard Ong	38,027	34.26	−5.32
Greens	Eric Hayward	14,410	12.98	+0.63
One Nation	Steve Kefalinos	4,520	4.07	+1.98
Christians	James Rai	3,459	3.12	+1.02
Legalise Cannabis	Phillip Leslie	3,400	3.06	+3.06
Total formal votes		110,991	97.69	+1.56
Informal votes		2,624	2.31	−1.56
Turnout		113,615	92.68	+0.56
Two-party-preferred result
Labor	Sam Lim	63,253	56.99	+4.14
Liberal	Howard Ong	47,738	43.01	−4.14
Labor hold		Swing	+4.14	
