= Dennis Jensen =

Australian politician (born 1962)

Dr Dennis Jensen

Member of the Australian Parliament for Tangney
- In office 9 October 2004 – 2 July 2016
- Preceded by: Daryl Williams
- Succeeded by: Ben Morton

Personal details
- Born: 28 February 1962 (age 64) Johannesburg, South Africa
- Party: Liberal (to 2016); Conservatives (2017–2019)
- Other political affiliations: Independent (2016)
- Domestic partner: Trudy Hoad
- Education: RMIT University; Melbourne University; Monash University
- Occupation: Research scientist; politician
- Website: www.dennisjensen.com.au

Dennis Geoffrey Jensen (born 28 February 1962) is an Australian former politician. He was elected to the House of Representatives at the 2004 federal election, winning the Division of Tangney for the Liberal Party. Jensen lost Liberal preselection for the 2016 federal election, and subsequently resigned from the party to stand as an independent. In August 2017 he joined the fledgling Australian Conservatives party. Jensen has a PhD in materials science from Monash University, and before entering politics worked as a CSIRO researcher. He is known for questioning the anthropogenic causation of climate change.

== Early life ==
Jensen was born in Johannesburg, South Africa, emigrated to Australia with parents and siblings in 1982. He was educated at RMIT University, the University of Melbourne and Monash University, from where he has a PhD in materials science. He worked at the CSIRO as a research scientist and for the Department of Defence as a defence analyst before entering politics.

== Politics ==
Jensen was the Liberal candidate for the Division of Corio, Victoria at the 1998 election.

In 2006, Jensen lost his preselection for Tangney for the 2007 federal election, but won it back with the support of the state executive and prime minister John Howard. He lost preselection again for the 2010 election, but once again the state executive intervened and restored him as Liberal candidate.

Jensen rejects the scientific consensus on human-induced global warming and, on behalf of the Lavoisier Group, organised the release of a book entitled Nine Facts About Climate Change by former mining CEO Ray Evans. In February 2007 during a Parliamentary sitting, Jensen quoted the then IPCC vice chairman Yuri Izrael, who had stated that "there is no proven link between human activity and global warming".

His reputation as a [climate sceptic] became national when he and four government colleagues disagreed with others of their party in a dissenting committee report regarding climate change.

Jensen boycotted Parliament on the day that the formal apology to the Stolen Generations was made by Prime Minister Kevin Rudd. He further courted controversy by telling Australian Indigenous people claiming to be affected by European colonisation over 200 years ago to "get over it." He was one of six Liberal MPs (including fellow West Australian MPs Wilson Tuckey, Luke Simpkins and the late Don Randall as well as Peter Dutton, Sophie Mirabella and the late Alby Schultz) to leave the house (or boycott entirely) in protest to the apology to the Stolen Generations.

He is opposed to same-sex marriage in Australia.

=== Lost Liberal pre-selection ===
Jensen lost Liberal preselection in Tangney for the 2016 federal election. It was revealed he had written a technothriller, falsely portrayed as a work of erotic fiction, named "The Skywarriors" in which Indonesia invades Australia. Former party state director Ben Morton won preselection. Jensen sued the Australian newspaper and Andrew Burrell, the journalist, for defamation. He won the case, and was paid a total of $1.1 million, including costs.

In August 2017, Jensen sent an email to former Liberal colleagues, saying he had joined the Australian Conservatives party started by Cory Bernardi, and urging them to follow him.

== Bibliography ==
- Jensen, Dennis (2016). The Skywarriors. OCLC 951640930.

Parliament of Australia
Preceded by Daryl Williams	Member for Tangney; 2004–2016	Succeeded by Ben Morton
