= List of electoral divisions in Western Australia =

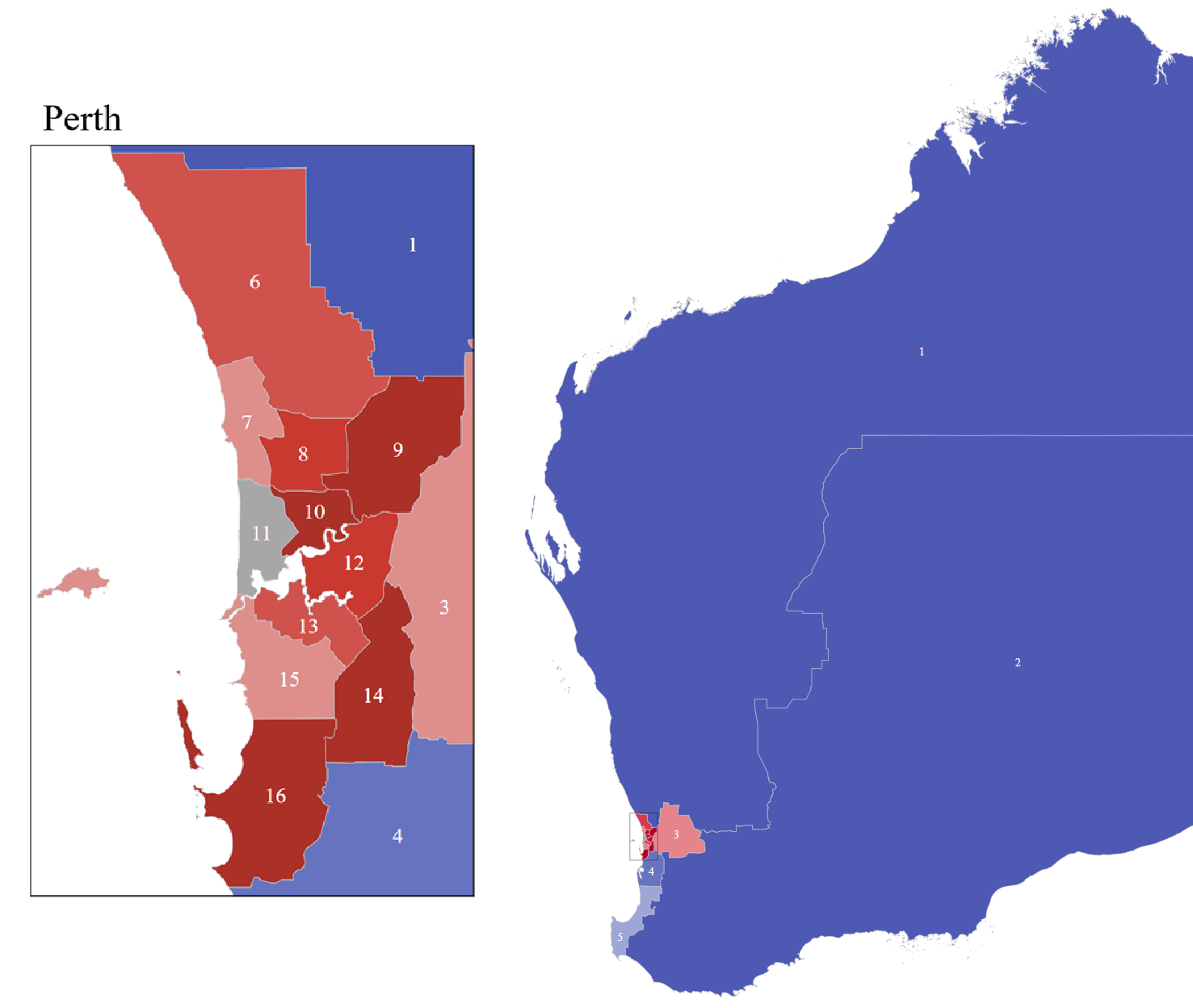
Results of the 2025 federal election

The Australian state of Western Australia is divided into 16 electoral divisions for the purposes of electing the Australian House of Representatives. At the 2025 federal election, the Australian Labor Party won 11 seats and the Liberal Party of Australia won 4 seats. One seat was won by independent Kate Chaney.

== Divisions ==
Name	Formed	Size (km^{2})	Classification	Current Member	Member's Party	References
Brand	1984	309	Outer-metropolitan	Madeleine King	Labor	
Bullwinkel	2024	9,508	Outer-metropolitan	Trish Cook	Labor	
Burt	2016	222	Outer-metropolitan	Matt Keogh	Labor	
Canning	1949	3,608	Outer-metropolitan	Andrew Hastie	Liberal	
Cowan	1984	108	Inner-metropolitan	Anne Aly	Labor	
Curtin	1949	92	Inner-metropolitan	Kate Chaney	Independent	
Durack	2010	1,410,947	Rural	Melissa Price	Liberal	
Forrest	1922	6,454	Rural	Ben Small	Liberal	
Fremantle	1901	191	Inner-metropolitan	Josh Wilson	Labor	
Hasluck	2001	258	Outer-metropolitan	Tania Lawrence	Labor	
Moore	1949	102	Outer-metropolitan	Tom French	Labor	
O'Connor	1980	1,093,790	Rural	Rick Wilson	Liberal	
Pearce	1989	755	Outer-metropolitan	Tracey Roberts	Labor	
Perth	1901	69	Inner-metropolitan	Patrick Gorman	Labor	
Swan	1901	124	Inner-metropolitan	Zaneta Mascarenhas	Labor	
Tangney	1974	97	Inner-metropolitan	Sam Lim	Labor	

== See also ==
- Parliament of Western Australia
