= Results of the 2025 Australian federal election in Western Australia =

2025 Australian federal election (Western Australia)
- 3 May 2025

All 16 Western Australian seats in the Australian House of Representatives and 6 (of 12) Western Australian seats in the Australian Senate
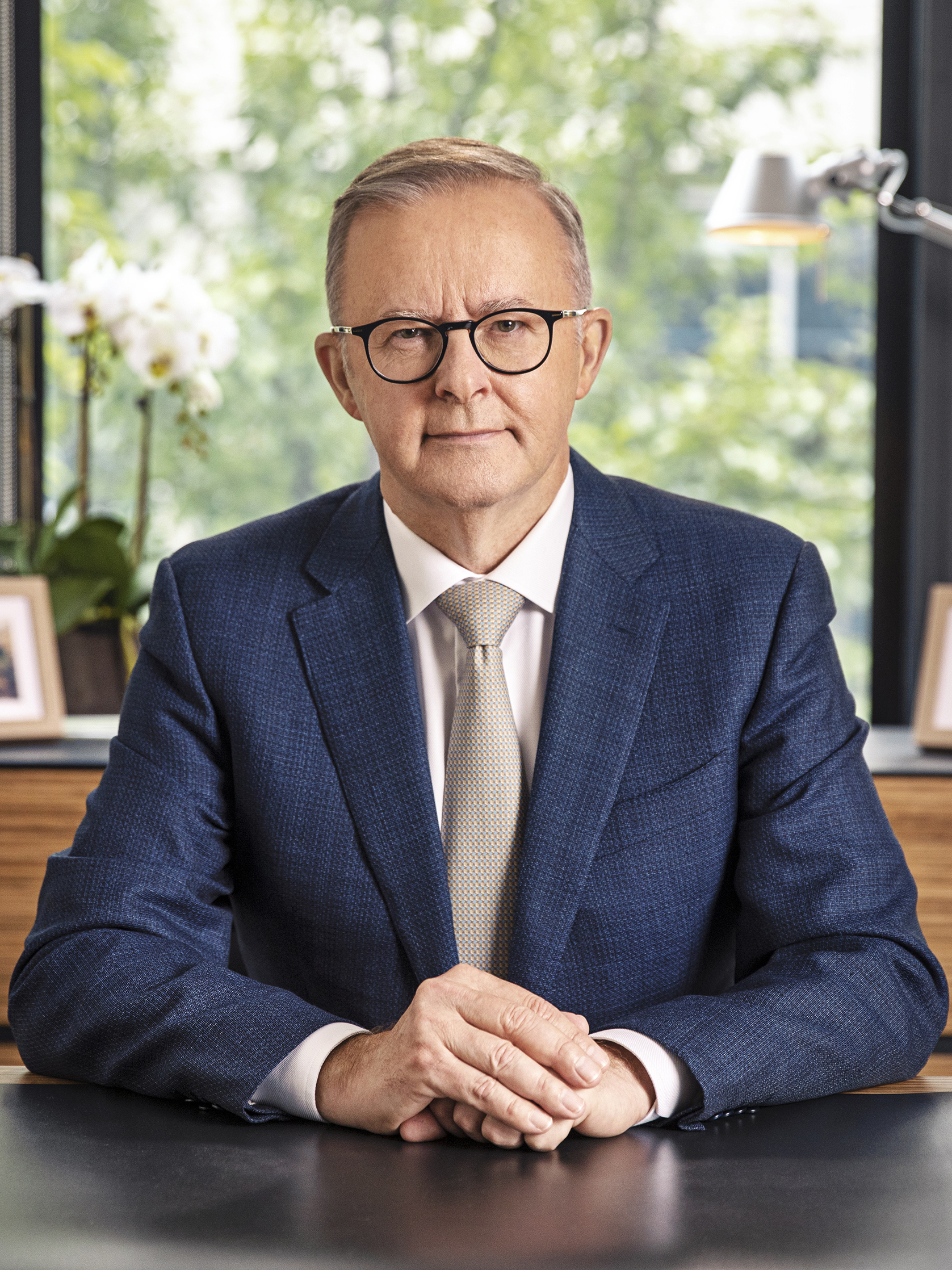

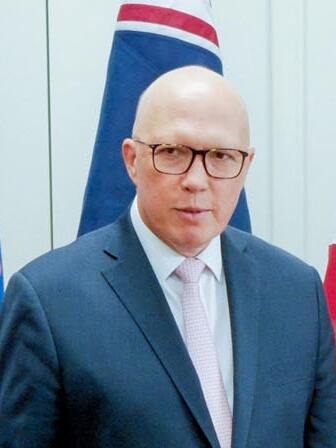
	First party	Second party
Leader	Anthony Albanese	Peter Dutton
Party	Labor	Coalition
Last election	9 seats	5 seats
Seats won	11	4
Seat change	▲2	▼1
Popular vote	568,895	458,187
Percentage	35.59%	28.66%
Swing	▼1.25	▼5.50
TPP	55.84%	44.16%
TPP swing	▲0.84	▼0.84
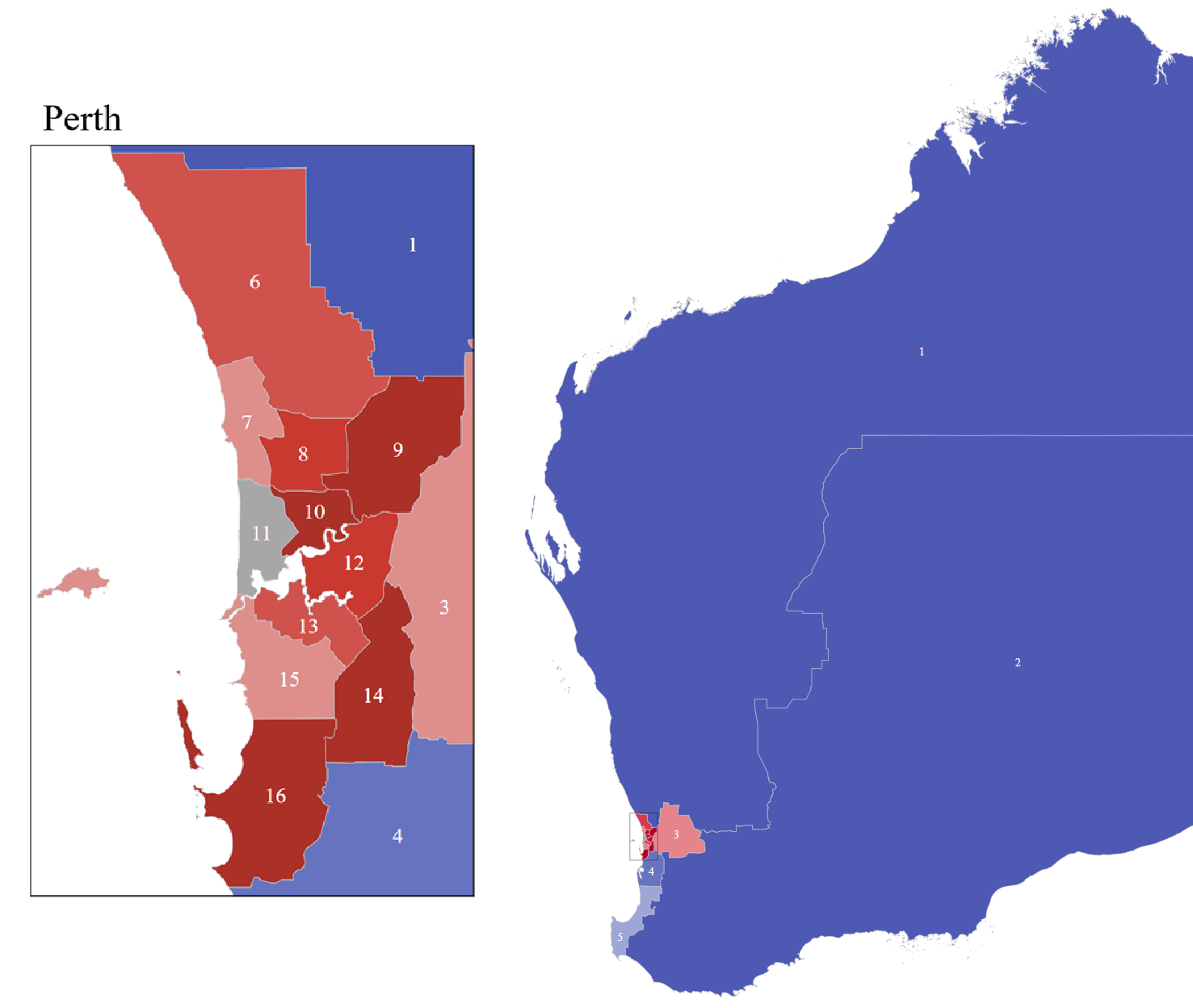

This is a list of electoral division results for the 2025 Australian federal election in the state of Western Australia.

Labor polled 55.8% of the two-party preferred vote in Western Australia, the party's best ever result in the state since 1949, and the worst ever performance for the Liberal Party since its formation in 1944.

== Overall results ==
House of Representatives (IRV) – Turnout 88.15% (CV)
Party	Votes	%	Swing (pp)	Seats	Change (seats)
Labor	568,895	35.59	−1.25	11	▲2
Liberal Party of Australia	458,187	28.66	−5.50	4	▼1
National Party of Australia	46,062	2.88	+2.26	0	Steady
Coalition total	504,249	31.54	−3.24	4	▼1
Greens	191,389	11.97	−0.53	0	Steady
One Nation	121,630	7.61	+3.66	0	Steady
Legalise Cannabis	66,547	4.16	+4.16	0	Steady
Christians	31,365	1.96	+0.61	0	Steady
Trumpet of Patriots	9,404	0.59	−0.49	0	Steady
Citizens	2,016	0.13	+0.13	0	Steady
Socialist Alliance	970	0.06	−0.02	0	Steady
Indigenous-Aboriginal	1,872	0.12	+0.12	0	Steady
Great Australian	1,509	0.09	−1.03	0	Steady
Independent	87,987	5.50	+3.06	1	Steady
Not affiliated	10,623	0.66	+0.66	0	Steady
Total	1,598,456	100.00	–	16	▲1
Invalid/blank votes	65,745	3.94	−1.58	–	–
Turnout	1,664,201	88.15	+0.15	–	–
Registered voters	1,888,016	–	–	–	–
Two-party-preferred vote
Labor	892,635	55.84	+0.84		
Liberal	705,821	44.16	−0.84		
Source: AEC

== Results by division ==
=== Brand ===
2025 Australian federal election: Brand
Party	Candidate	Votes	%	±%
Labor	Madeleine King	43,014	45.86	−4.82
Liberal	Claire Moody	18,472	19.69	−2.11
Greens	Jody Freeman	12,412	13.23	+1.95
One Nation	Stephen Box	11,960	12.75	+7.44
Legalise Cannabis	Jim Matters	7,935	8.46	+8.46
Total formal votes		93,793	96.62	+3.07
Informal votes		3,283	3.38	−3.07
Turnout		97,076	86.32	+4.18
Two-party-preferred result
Labor	Madeleine King	62,766	66.92	−0.15
Liberal	Claire Moody	31,027	33.08	+0.15
Labor hold		Swing	−0.15	

=== Bullwinkel ===
2025 Australian federal election: Bullwinkel
Party	Candidate	Votes	%	±%
Labor	Trish Cook	33,436	31.95	−4.51
Liberal	Matt Moran	25,433	24.30	−10.05
National	Mia Davies	16,507	15.77	+14.40
Greens	Abbey Bishop	11,728	11.21	−0.09
One Nation	Trevor Mayes	9,011	8.61	+4.28
Legalise Cannabis	Penelope Young	5,262	5.03	+5.03
Christians	Les Holten	3,287	3.14	+2.11
Total formal votes		104,664	96.44	+1.97
Informal votes		3,867	3.56	−1.97
Turnout		108,531	89.43	+3.21
Two-party-preferred result
Labor	Trish Cook	52,865	50.51	−2.84
Liberal	Matt Moran	51,799	49.49	+2.84
Labor hold		Swing	−2.84	

Alluvial diagram illustrating the full distribution of preferences in the seat of Bullwinkel for the 2025 Federal Election

=== Burt ===
2025 Australian federal election: Burt
Party	Candidate	Votes	%	±%
Labor	Matt Keogh	46,123	46.73	−3.03
Liberal	Sean Ayres	18,879	19.13	−5.67
Greens	Adam Abdul Razak	11,336	11.49	+1.96
One Nation	Liz Ierardi	9,789	9.92	+5.07
Legalise Cannabis	Fiona Caruso	5,784	5.86	+5.86
Christians	Alvin Mathew Vadakkedathu	4,630	4.69	+0.89
Independent	Ashok Kumar Tewatia	2,150	2.18	+2.18
Total formal votes		98,691	95.52	+1.42
Informal votes		4,634	4.48	−1.42
Turnout		103,325	86.11	+4.63
Two-party-preferred result
Labor	Matt Keogh	64,845	65.71	+2.42
Liberal	Sean Ayres	33,846	34.29	−2.42
Labor hold		Swing	+2.42	

=== Canning ===
2025 Australian federal election: Canning
Party	Candidate	Votes	%	±%
Liberal	Andrew Hastie	42,794	42.52	+0.95
Labor	Jarrad Goold	30,098	29.90	−5.08
One Nation	Fernando Bove	11,488	11.41	+6.79
Greens	Jordan Cahill	8,967	8.91	+0.59
Legalise Cannabis	Paul Gullan (disendorsed)	6,216	6.18	+6.18
Citizens	John Carey	1,084	1.08	+1.08
Total formal votes		100,647	96.69	+3.20
Informal votes		3,450	3.31	−3.20
Turnout		104,097	87.28	+4.96
Two-party-preferred result
Liberal	Andrew Hastie	56,917	56.55	+5.35
Labor	Jarrad Goold	43,730	43.45	−5.35
Liberal hold		Swing	+5.35	

=== Cowan ===
2025 Australian federal election: Cowan
Party	Candidate	Votes	%	±%
Labor	Anne Aly	44,826	46.63	+0.88
Liberal	Felicia Adeniyi	23,233	24.17	−6.79
Greens	Matthew Count	10,367	10.78	+0.79
One Nation	Bradley Yates	4,869	5.06	+2.12
Legalise Cannabis	John Bell	4,103	4.27	+4.27
Independent	Wade McDonald	3,417	3.55	+3.55
Christians	Wesley D'Costa	3,015	3.14	+1.13
Trumpet of Patriots	Charles Smith	2,311	2.40	+1.34
Total formal votes		96,141	93.04	+0.40
Informal votes		7,194	6.96	−0.40
Turnout		103,335	88.71	+1.86
Two-party-preferred result
Labor	Anne Aly	61,179	63.63	+3.69
Liberal	Felicia Adeniyi	34,962	36.37	−3.69
Labor hold		Swing	+3.69	

=== Curtin ===
2025 Australian federal election: Curtin
Party	Candidate	Votes	%	±%
Liberal	Tom White	42,436	40.28	−1.08
Independent	Kate Chaney	33,952	32.23	+2.51
Labor	Viktor Ko	15,626	14.83	+1.08
Greens	Kitty Hemsley	8,235	7.82	−2.53
One Nation	Alexander Ironside	2,731	2.59	+1.38
Legalise Cannabis	Fred Mulholland	2,368	2.25	+2.25
Total formal votes		105,348	98.32	+1.40
Informal votes		1,805	1.68	−1.40
Turnout		107,153	91.39	+1.24
Notional two-party-preferred count
Liberal	Tom White	54,949	52.16	−3.48
Labor	Viktor Ko	50,399	47.84	+3.48
Two-candidate-preferred result
Independent	Kate Chaney	56,118	53.27	+1.95
Liberal	Tom White	49,230	46.73	−1.95
Independent hold		Swing	+1.95	

=== Durack ===
2025 Australian federal election: Durack
Party	Candidate	Votes	%	±%
Liberal	Melissa Price	28,920	32.88	−2.52
Labor	Karen Wheatland	20,583	23.40	−5.36
National	Bailey Kempton	11,972	13.61	+4.17
One Nation	Mark Berry	8,868	10.08	+3.04
Greens	Brendan Sturcke	7,196	8.18	−1.32
Legalise Cannabis	Kat Wright	5,239	5.96	+5.96
Christians	Eugenie Harris	1,880	2.14	+2.01
Indigenous-Aboriginal	Jason Hunter	1,872	2.13	+2.13
Trumpet of Patriots	Maarten Kornaat	1,432	1.63	+0.12
Total formal votes		87,962	93.65	+0.16
Informal votes		5,966	6.35	−0.16
Turnout		93,928	78.31	+1.88
Two-party-preferred result
Liberal	Melissa Price	52,912	60.15	+5.49
Labor	Karen Wheatland	35,050	39.85	−5.49
Liberal hold		Swing	+5.49	

=== Forrest ===
2025 Australian federal election: Forrest
Party	Candidate	Votes	%	±%
Liberal	Ben Small	31,011	31.18	−11.89
Labor	Tabitha Dowding	22,423	22.55	−5.03
Independent	Sue Chapman	18,206	18.31	+18.31
One Nation	Paul van der Mey	8,670	8.72	+3.47
Greens	Georgia Beardman	7,840	7.88	−5.57
Legalise Cannabis	Aaron Peet	5,131	5.16	+5.16
National	Cam Parsons	4,771	4.80	+4.80
Trumpet of Patriots	Peter Greenland	1,405	1.41	+0.23
Total formal votes		99,457	94.79	+0.02
Informal votes		5,465	5.21	−0.02
Turnout		104,922	89.31	+4.30
Two-party-preferred result
Liberal	Ben Small	51,952	52.24	−1.95
Labor	Tabitha Dowding	47,505	47.76	+1.95
Liberal hold		Swing	−1.95	

=== Fremantle ===
2025 Australian federal election: Fremantle
Party	Candidate	Votes	%	±%
Labor	Josh Wilson	39,427	38.60	−5.46
Independent	Kate Hulett	23,500	23.01	+23.01
Liberal	Tait Marston	19,254	18.85	−5.30
Greens	Amy Warne	11,802	11.56	−6.47
One Nation	Hannah Marriner	6,245	6.11	+2.94
Socialist Alliance	Joshua Last	970	0.95	−0.27
Citizens	John Bird	932	0.91	+0.91
Total formal votes		102,130	96.45	+2.26
Informal votes		3,764	3.55	−2.26
Turnout		105,894	89.49	+3.84
Notional two-party-preferred count
Labor	Josh Wilson	70,145	68.68	+1.75
Liberal	Tait Marston	31,985	31.32	−1.75
Two-candidate-preferred result
Labor	Josh Wilson	51,765	50.69	−16.24
Independent	Kate Hulett	50,365	49.31	+49.31
Labor hold				

=== Hasluck ===
2025 Australian federal election: Hasluck
Party	Candidate	Votes	%	±%
Labor	Tania Lawrence	46,203	48.35	+4.71
Liberal	David Goode	21,173	22.16	−7.99
Greens	Tamica Matson	11,912	12.47	+1.04
One Nation	Adrian Deeth	7,050	7.38	+3.88
Legalise Cannabis	Leo Treasure	4,842	5.07	+5.07
Christians	David Kingston	2,862	3.00	+2.30
Great Australian	Dawn Kelly	1,509	1.58	+1.47
Total formal votes		95,551	96.00	+2.35
Informal votes		3,978	4.00	−2.35
Turnout		99,529	87.88	+4.86
Two-party-preferred result
Labor	Tania Lawrence	63,039	65.97	+5.93
Liberal	David Goode	32,512	34.03	−5.93
Labor hold		Swing	+5.93	

=== Moore ===
2025 Australian federal election: Moore
Party	Candidate	Votes	%	±%
Labor	Tom French	34,734	32.51	+0.62
Liberal	Vince Connelly	33,595	31.45	−10.36
Greens	Scott McCarthy	11,877	11.12	−2.99
Independent	Ian Goodenough	10,623	9.94	+9.94
Independent	Nathan Barton	6,762	6.33	+6.33
One Nation	Paul Fimognari	4,840	4.53	+1.26
Christians	Trevor Bartley	2,347	2.20	+2.20
Trumpet of Patriots	Christopher Rennick	2,059	1.93	+1.16
Total formal votes		106,837	95.22	−0.64
Informal votes		5,367	4.78	+0.64
Turnout		112,204	92.15	+1.26
Two-party-preferred result
Labor	Tom French	56,502	52.89	+3.80
Liberal	Vince Connelly	50,335	47.11	−3.80
Labor gain from Liberal		Swing	+3.80	

=== O'Connor ===
2025 Australian federal election: O'Connor
Party	Candidate	Votes	%	±%
Liberal	Rick Wilson	34,488	34.45	−10.05
Labor	Darren Moir	21,080	21.06	−5.68
National	Heidi Tempra	12,812	12.80	+12.80
One Nation	Gemma Johnston	11,053	11.04	+4.14
Greens	Giz Watson	10,014	10.00	−0.89
Legalise Cannabis	Philip Arnatt	5,394	5.39	+5.39
Christians	Deonne Kingsford	3,077	3.07	+0.27
Trumpet of Patriots	Lindsay Cameron	2,197	2.19	+0.75
Total formal votes		100,115	94.66	+0.38
Informal votes		5,649	5.34	−0.38
Turnout		105,764	86.69	+1.91
Two-party-preferred result
Liberal	Rick Wilson	63,356	63.28	+6.59
Labor	Darren Moir	36,759	36.72	−6.59
Liberal hold		Swing	+6.59	

=== Pearce ===
2025 Australian federal election: Pearce
Party	Candidate	Votes	%	±%
Labor	Tracey Roberts	39,303	40.07	−2.33
Liberal	Jan Norberger	27,979	28.52	−1.60
Greens	Nicholas D'Alonzo	11,640	11.87	+0.63
One Nation	John Burton	9,089	9.27	+4.57
Legalise Cannabis	Ramon Granados Rangel	6,777	6.91	+6.91
Christians	Vanessa Montgomery	3,305	3.37	+1.39
Total formal votes		98,093	96.94	+2.96
Informal votes		3,094	3.06	−2.96
Turnout		101,187	87.78	+5.43
Two-party-preferred result
Labor	Tracey Roberts	55,360	56.44	−2.40
Liberal	Jan Norberger	42,733	43.56	+2.40
Labor hold		Swing	−2.40	

=== Perth ===
2025 Australian federal election: Perth
Party	Candidate	Votes	%	±%
Labor	Patrick Gorman	42,947	43.05	+3.91
Liberal	Susanna Panaia	26,026	26.09	−1.12
Greens	Sophie Greer	24,467	24.53	+2.52
One Nation	Peter Hallifax	6,316	6.33	+3.71
Total formal votes		99,756	97.56	+3.07
Informal votes		2,491	2.44	−3.07
Turnout		102,247	89.33	+0.44
Two-party-preferred result
Labor	Patrick Gorman	66,350	66.51	+2.09
Liberal	Susanna Panaia	33,406	33.49	−2.09
Labor hold		Swing	+2.09	

=== Swan ===
2025 Australian federal election: Swan
Party	Candidate	Votes	%	±%
Labor	Zaneta Mascarenhas	41,897	42.63	+2.58
Liberal	Mic Fels	26,467	26.93	−4.69
Greens	Clint Uink	17,186	17.49	+2.41
One Nation	Michael Halley	5,131	5.22	+2.74
Legalise Cannabis	Shelley Leech	4,096	4.17	+4.17
Christians	Mark Staer	3,503	3.56	+1.49
Total formal votes		98,280	96.93	+2.02
Informal votes		3,114	3.07	−2.02
Turnout		101,394	87.33	−0.05
Two-party-preferred result
Labor	Zaneta Mascarenhas	62,888	63.99	+4.56
Liberal	Mic Fels	35,392	36.01	−4.56
Labor hold		Swing	+4.56	

=== Tangney ===
2025 Australian federal election: Tangney
Party	Candidate	Votes	%	±%
Labor	Sam Lim	47,175	42.50	+4.35
Liberal	Howard Ong	38,027	34.26	−5.32
Greens	Eric Hayward	14,410	12.98	+0.63
One Nation	Steve Kefalinos	4,520	4.07	+1.98
Christians	James Rai	3,459	3.12	+1.02
Legalise Cannabis	Phillip Leslie	3,400	3.06	+3.06
Total formal votes		110,991	97.69	+1.56
Informal votes		2,624	2.31	−1.56
Turnout		113,615	92.68	+0.56
Two-party-preferred result
Labor	Sam Lim	63,253	56.99	+4.14
Liberal	Howard Ong	47,738	43.01	−4.14
Labor hold		Swing	+4.14	
