= Electoral results for the Division of Bullwinkel =

Australian division election results

This is a list of electoral results for the Division of Bullwinkel in Australian federal elections from the division's creation in 2025 until the present.

== Members ==
Member	Party	Term
Labor	Trish Cook	2025–present

== Election results ==
=== Elections in the 2020s ===
==== 2025 ====
2025 Australian federal election: Bullwinkel
Party	Candidate	Votes	%	±%
Labor	Trish Cook	33,436	31.95	−4.51
Liberal	Matt Moran	25,433	24.30	−10.05
National	Mia Davies	16,507	15.77	+14.40
Greens	Abbey Bishop	11,728	11.21	−0.09
One Nation	Trevor Mayes	9,011	8.61	+4.28
Legalise Cannabis	Penelope Young	5,262	5.03	+5.03
Christians	Les Holten	3,287	3.14	+2.11
Total formal votes		104,664	96.44	+1.97
Informal votes		3,867	3.56	−1.97
Turnout		108,531	89.43	+3.21
Two-party-preferred result
Labor	Trish Cook	52,865	50.51	−2.84
Liberal	Matt Moran	51,799	49.49	+2.84
Labor hold		Swing	−2.84	

Alluvial diagram illustrating the full distribution of preferences in the seat of Bullwinkel for the 2025 Federal Election
