= Westralia =

Westralia was a common contraction of Western Australia in the 19th and 20th centuries.

Westralia may refer to:

== Secessionism in WA ==
- Westralia, a name associated with secessionism in Western Australia, as in "Dominion of Westralia", since 1901

== Ships ==
- HMAS Westralia, the name of two ships to serve in the Royal Australian Navy
  - HMAS Westralia (1939), an armed merchant cruiser and later, infantry landing ship, operated during World War II
  - HMAS Westralia (O 195), a replenishment tanker operated between 1989 and 2006
- SS Westralia (1896), a passenger liner converted into a troopship and sunk in 1942

== See also ==
- West Australian Airways, a former airline company
- Westralian Sands Ltd, a former company, merged into Iluka Resources
- Westralia Square, an office tower in Perth
