= Trish Cook =

Australian politician and nurse (born 1964)

Dr. Trish Cook MP
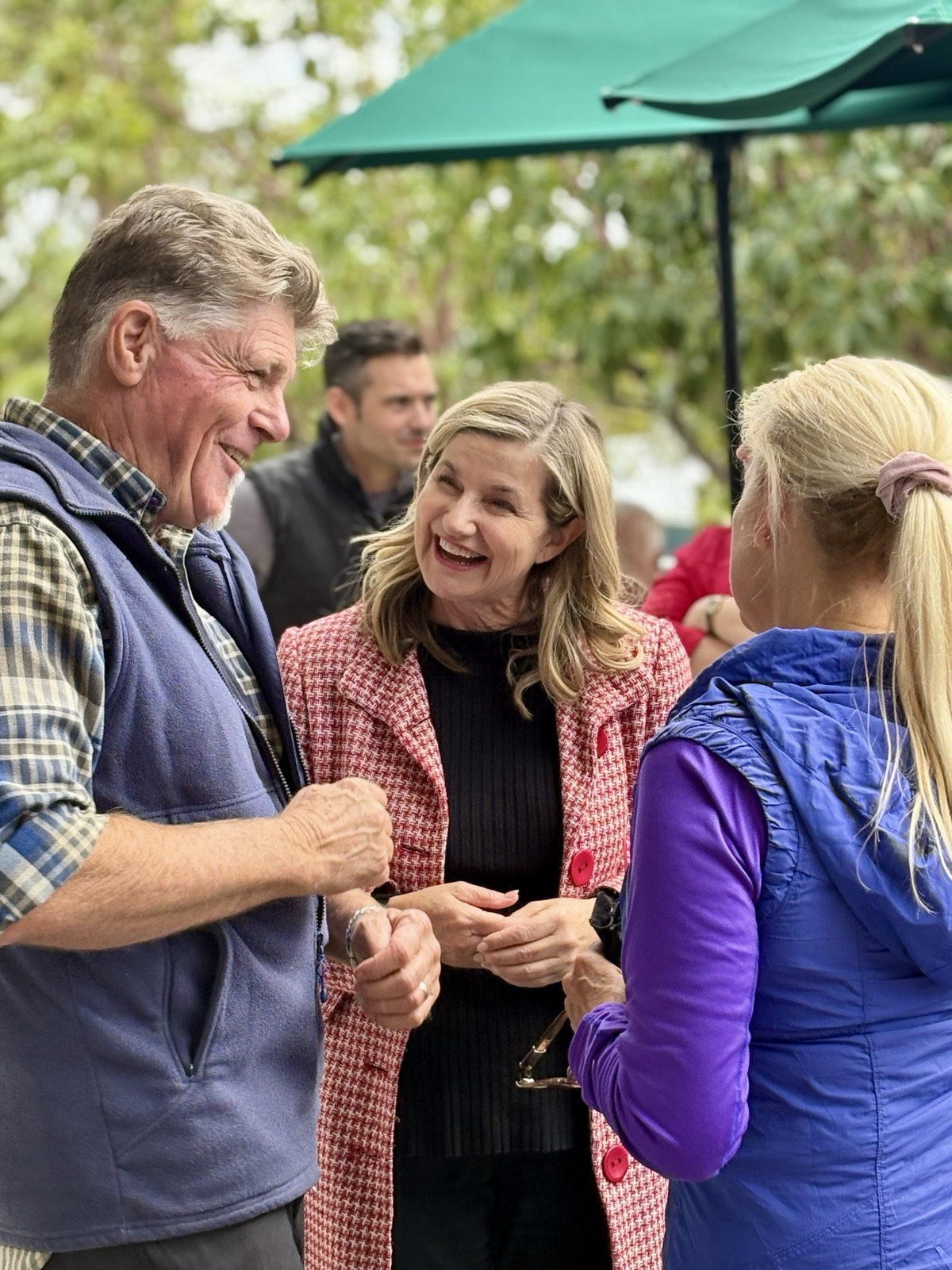

Member of the Australian Parliament for Bullwinkel
- Incumbent
- Assumed office 3 May 2025
- Preceded by: Division created

Deputy Shire President of Mundaring
- In office October 2023 – 28 May 2025
- Preceded by: Paige McNeil
- Succeeded by: Luke Ellery

Personal details
- Born: 1 June 1964 (age 62) Perth, Western Australia
- Party: Labor
- Education: Edith Cowan University; Curtin University
- Occupation: Politician, nurse, midwife
- Website: trish-cook.com.au

Patricia Ann Cook (born 1 June 1964) is an Australian politician. She is a member of the Australian Labor Party (ALP) and is a member of the House of Representatives since 2025, representing the Western Australian seat of Bullwinkel. She worked as a nurse and midwife before entering politics.

She was deputy shire president for the Shire of Mundaring, where she lives in Darlington, from 2023 to 2025.

== Education ==
Cook first received a General Nursing Diploma from a St John of God hospital in 1985 before getting a Midwifery diploma in 1988, and receiving her bachelor of Health Science in 1996 from Edith Cowan University (ECU). Between 1999 and 2006 she attended Curtin University gaining a graduate diploma and masters in Occupational Health and Safety. She returned to ECU in 2016 to gain a PhD.

Cook completed her PhD in 2026 at Edith Cowan University and is now both a registered nurse and Doctor of Philosophy.

== Career ==
As a nurse she worked in regional areas of Western Australia such as Northam, and briefly in the Solomon Islands. While working under Occupational Health and Safety from 1996 she worked for the oil and gas sector until 2011. From 2008 to 2011 Cook was a lecturer at Curtin University for Occupational Health and Safety. She also worked as a tutor for undergraduate students at ECU at Joondalup from 2017 to 2021.

=== Politics ===
Cook was first elected to Mundaring Shire Council on 19 October 2013 in an ordinary election for South Ward receiving 28.29% of the vote (779 votes). Her term expired on 21 October 2017 and did not contest for another term, being succeeded by Darrell Jones. She did run in the 2021 ordinary election and was once again elected as a councilor for South Ward. In October 2023. Cook was appointed as deputy shire president succeeding Paige McNeil who had been elected as shire president.

In September 2024 the federal ALP selected Trish Cook as their candidate for the newly created Division of Bullwinkel having replaced their previous candidate MLC Kyle McGinn who was originally chosen in July by the state ALP administration, neither the ALP, McGinn, or Cook commented on why the change was made. The live sheep export ban was a contentious issue in the new electorate in the lead-up to the election.

At the 2025 federal election, Cook won the new marginal seat of Bullwinkel as its first member of parliament, though the seat took several days to call; the margin was 1,066 votes. She subsequently resigned from her position as a councilor and Deputy Shire President of Mundaring on 28 May 2025. She was succeeded by councilor Luke Ellery as Deputy Shire President of Mundaring.

On 6 April 2026, a Mazda 3 sedan crashed into Cook's Kalamunda electorate office after colliding with a Toyota Corolla; no injuries occurred.

Parliament of Australia
| New division | Member for Bullwinkel; 2025–present | Incumbent |
