= Division of Bullwinkel =

Australian federal electoral division

Bullwinkel Australian House of Representatives Division
- Interactive map of electorate boundaries from the 2025 federal election
- Created: 2024
- MP: Trish Cook
- Party: Labor
- Namesake: Vivian Bullwinkel
- Area: 9,508 km^{2} (3,671.1 sq mi)
- Demographic: Outer metropolitan
Electorates around Bullwinkel:
Durack	Durack	Durack
Hasluck; Swan; Burt	Bullwinkel	O'Connor
Canning	O'Connor	O'Connor

The Division of Bullwinkel is an Australian electoral division in the state of Western Australia contested for the first time at the 2025 federal election. It was created in 2024 as part of a redistribution, a statutory process to maintain broad population equality amongst lower house seats over time and as populations shift, and thus maintain broadly one vote one value. The process was managed, and ultimately new boundaries for WA divisions were determined, by Australia's independent statutory elections authority, the Australian Electoral Commission. The current representative as of the 2025 Australian federal election is Trish Cook of the Australian Labor Party.

The seat at its creation was a 'marginal seat', being notionally held by the Labor Party by only 3.3%.

A hybrid urban-rural seat, Bullwinkel takes in certain outer eastern suburbs of Perth, then sweeps out to the northeast and southeast, to cover rural areas to the east of the state capital's metropolitan area. It incorporates areas that were formerly parts of the divisions of Hasluck, Durack, Swan, O'Connor and Canning, prior to the redrawing of their boundaries. Those boundary changes, and new boundaries for the new seat, took effect from the first election of the whole House of Representatives held after the 2024 effective date of the redistribution: namely, the 2025 Australian election.

== Naming ==
The seat is named for Lieutenant Colonel Vivian Statham, AO, MBE, ARRC, ED (née Bullwinkel), an Australian Army nurse during the Second World War who was the sole surviving nurse of the Bangka Island massacre. After making it back to Australia following the war, Bullwinkel had a long and successful career in nursing across Australia, and lived for the last 23 years of her life in Perth.

A number of objections were received to adoption of the name, as Bullwinkel had moved to Western Australia only later in her life, and had no particular association with the specific area covered by the new division. Other names were suggested, including that of a local nurse killed in the Bangka Massacre named Alma Beard. The AEC maintained the name Bullwinkel on the grounds, amongst others, that the naming of federal electorates recognised the "extent of a person's contribution to the country as a whole" and across the whole of their life.

== Members ==
Image	Member	Party	Term	Notes
	Trish Cook (1964–)	Labor	3 May 2025 – present	Incumbent

== Election results ==
2025 Australian federal election: Bullwinkel
Party	Candidate	Votes	%	±%
Labor	Trish Cook	33,436	31.95	−4.51
Liberal	Matt Moran	25,433	24.30	−10.05
National	Mia Davies	16,507	15.77	+14.40
Greens	Abbey Bishop	11,728	11.21	−0.09
One Nation	Trevor Mayes	9,011	8.61	+4.28
Legalise Cannabis	Penelope Young	5,262	5.03	+5.03
Christians	Les Holten	3,287	3.14	+2.11
Total formal votes		104,664	96.44	+1.97
Informal votes		3,867	3.56	−1.97
Turnout		108,531	89.43	+3.21
Two-party-preferred result
Labor	Trish Cook	52,865	50.51	−2.84
Liberal	Matt Moran	51,799	49.49	+2.84
Labor hold		Swing	−2.84	

Alluvial diagram illustrating the full distribution of preferences in the seat of Bullwinkel for the 2025 Federal Election
