= Western Australia =

State of Australia

- State
- Flag Coat of arms
- Nickname(s): The Golden State; The Wildflower State; The State of Excitement
- Location of Western Australia in Australia; 26°S 121°E
- Country: Australia
- Before federation: Colony of Western Australia
- Established as the Swan River Colony: 2 May 1829
- Responsible government: 21 October 1890
- Federation: 1 January 1901
- Capital and largest city: Perth
- Administration: 139 local government areas
- Demonym(s): Western/West Australian; West Aussie; Sandgroper (colloquial)
- Government: Federated parliamentary constitutional monarchy
  - Monarch: Charles III
  - Governor: Chris Dawson
  - Premier: Roger Cook (Labor)
- Legislature: Parliament of Western Australia
  - Upper house: Legislative Council
  - Lower house: Legislative Assembly
- Judiciary: Supreme Court of Western Australia

Parliament of Australia
  - Senate: 12 senators (of 76)
  - House of Representatives: 16 seats (of 150)

Area
  - Total: 2,527,013 km^{2} (975,685 sq mi) (1st)
- Highest elevation (Mount Meharry): 1,249 m (4,098 ft)

Population
  - 2026-03 estimate: 3,096,222 (4th)
  - Density: 1.23/km^{2} (3.2/sq mi) (7th)
- GSP: 2022 estimate
  - Total: A$377.257B (4th)
  - Per capita: A$135,320 (1st)
- HDI (2023): ▲0.973 very high · 2nd
- Time zone: UTC+08:00 (AWST); UTC+08:45 (Eucla, Cocklebiddy, Madura, Mundrabilla, Caiguna); DST not observed)
- Postal abbreviation: WA
- ISO 3166 code: AU–WA
- Symbols
- Bird: Black swan (Cygnus atratus)
- Fish: Whale shark (Rhincodon typus)
- Flower: Red and green kangaroo paw (Anigozanthos manglesii)
- Mammal: Numbat (Myrmecobius fasciatus)
- Colour(s): Black and gold
- Fossil: Gogo fish (Mcnamaraspis kaprios)
- Website: wa.gov.au

Western Australia (commonly abbreviated as WA) is the westernmost state of Australia. It is bounded by the Indian Ocean to the north and west, the Southern Ocean to the south, the Northern Territory to the north-east, and South Australia to the south-east. Western Australia is Australia's largest state, with a land area of 2,527,013 square kilometres (975,685 sq mi), and is also the second-largest subdivision of any country on Earth. (Note: Surpassed only by the Sakha Republic in eastern Russia, and formerly Northwest Territories in Canada, before the creation of Nunavut. It is also the largest proper subnational entity, being a state rather than a territory or an autonomous region.)

The state has a diverse range of climates, including tropical conditions in the Kimberley, deserts in the interior (including the Great Sandy Desert, Little Sandy Desert, Gibson Desert, and Great Victoria Desert) and a Mediterranean climate on the south-west and southern coastal areas. As of June 2024, the state has 2.965 million inhabitants—10.9 percent of the national total. Over 90 percent of the state's population live in the south-west corner and around 80 percent live in the state capital Perth, leaving the remainder of the state sparsely populated. The Trans-Australian Railway and the Eyre Highway traverse the Nullarbor Plain in the state's south-east, providing the principal connection between Western Australia and the population centres in the eastern states.

Western Australia's Indigenous peoples have been present for tens of thousands of years. Dutch explorers visited Western Australia from the 17th century, with Dirk Hartog's 1616 expedition the first Europeans to make landfall. The British claimed Western Australia in 1827 and established the Swan River Colony with Perth as its capital in 1829. The Western Australian gold rushes of the late 19th century resulted in a significant population influx. The colony was granted responsible government in 1890, the last of the Australian colonies to become self-governing, and federated with the other colonies in 1901.

The state's mining sector is a key driver of the state economy. The late 20th century saw the development of the state's significant iron ore mining industry – the world's largest – as well as primarily offshore petroleum and natural gas resources. Gold mining retains a significant presence and many other mineral commodities are mined, with Perth being a major centre for associated services. Outside of mining, primary industry is the other significant contributor to the state's economy, including agriculture in the Wheatbelt and temperate southern coastal regions, pastoralism in marginal grassland areas, forestry in the south-west and fishing (including pearling and, historically, whaling).

== History ==
The first human inhabitants of Australia arrived from the north "over 50,000 years ago and possibly as much as 70,000 years ago". Over thousands of years they eventually spread across the whole landmass. These Indigenous Australians were long established throughout Western Australia by the time European explorers began to arrive in the early 17th century.

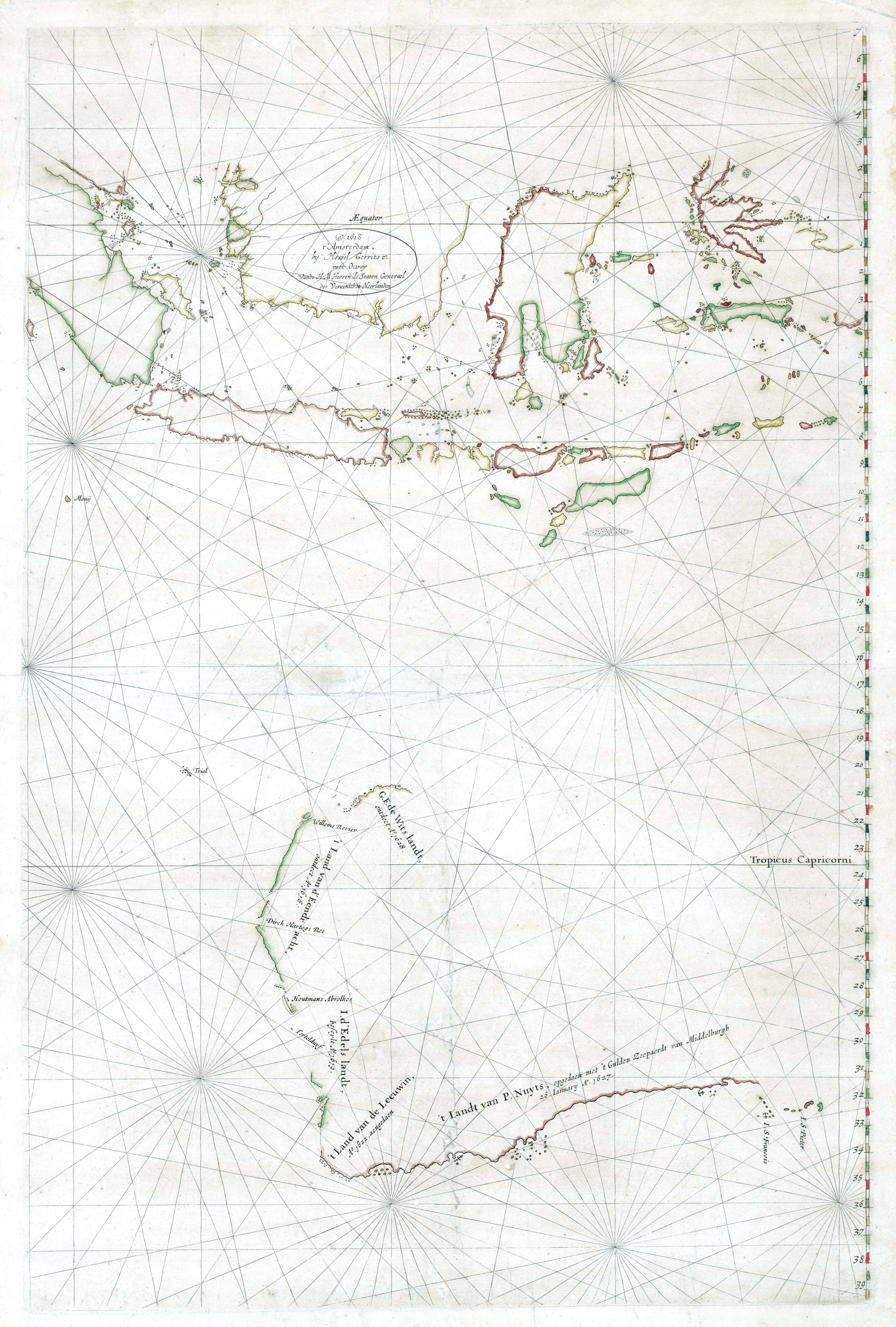
Map first drawn in 1618 by Hessel Gerritsz, 12 years after Europeans first encountered the Australian mainland, showing the charted coast of Australia. Chartings after 1618, for example by François Thijssen in 1627, were added to the engraved plate between 1628 and 1632.

The first Europeans to visit Western Australia were those of the Dutch Dirk Hartog expedition, who on 25 October 1616 landed at what is now known as Cape Inscription, Dirk Hartog Island. For the rest of the 17th century, other Dutch and British navigators encountered the coast of what Abel Tasman named New Holland in 1644, usually unintentionally as demonstrated by the many shipwrecks along the coast of ships that deviated from the Brouwer Route (because of poor navigation and storms). By the late 18th century, British and French sailors had begun to explore the Western Australian coast. The Baudin expedition of 1800–03 included the coast of Western Australia and resulted in the Freycinet Map of 1811, the first published map featuring the full outline of Australia. The name New Holland remained in popular and semi-official use until at least the mid-1850s; that is, it was in use for about 206 years in comparison to the name Australia which to date has been in use for about 197 years.

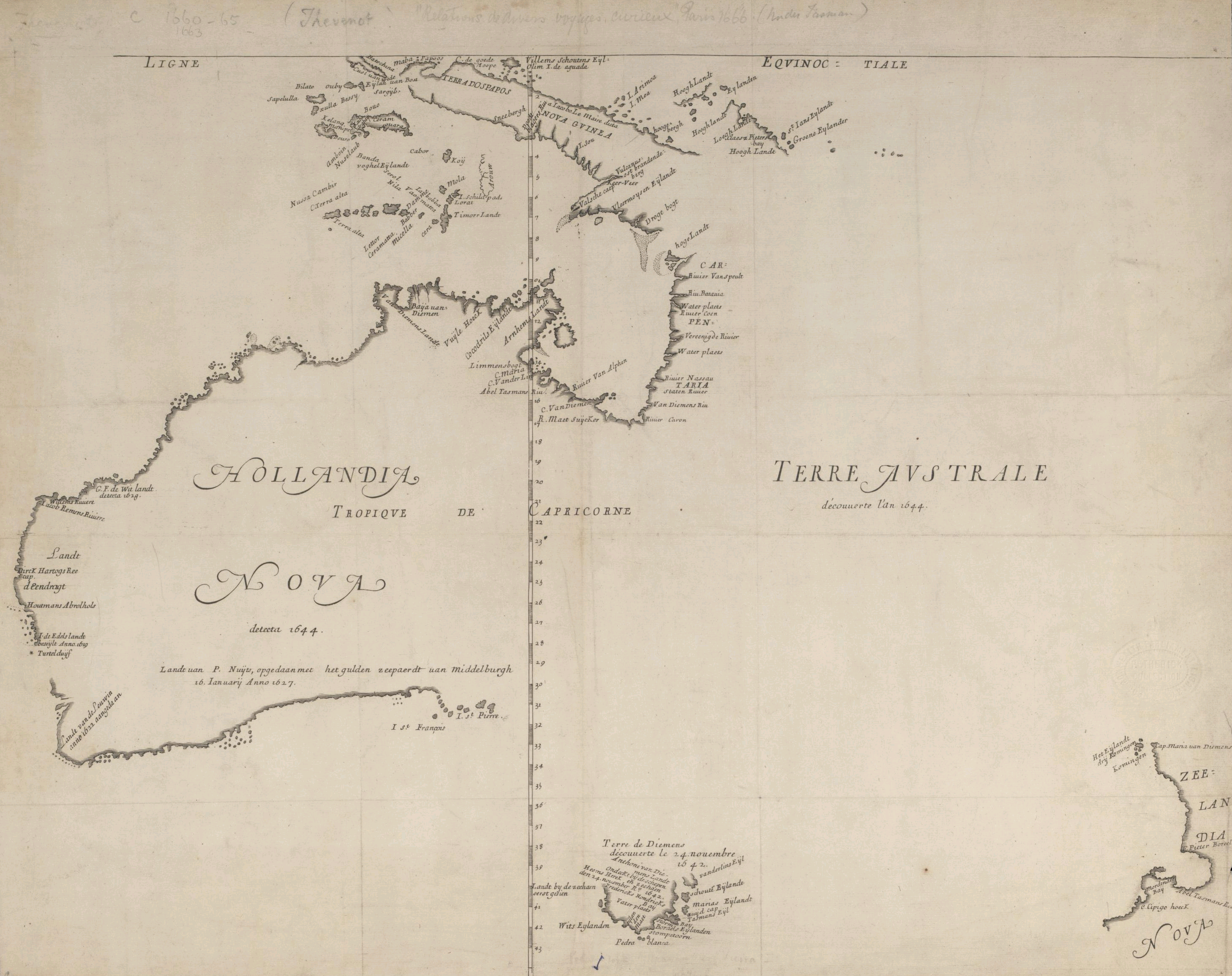
Melchisédech Thévenot's Hollandia Nova—Terre Australe in his travel anthology (French: Relations de divers voyages curieux) published in 1664, and which seems to be a copy of Archipelagus Orientalis sive Asiaticus by Joan Blaeu in the Atlas of the Great Elector (German: Atlas des Großen Kurfürsten) from 1659. The latitude staff depicted by Thévenot falls along the Zaragoza antimeridian from the Treaty of Zaragoza of 1529 between Castile and Portugal, and which complemented the Tordesillas meridian from the Treaty of Tordesillas of 1494.

The origins of the present state began with the establishment by Edmund Lockyer of a convict-supported settlement from New South Wales at King George III Sound. The settlement was formally annexed on 21 January 1827 by Lockyer when he commanded the Union Jack be raised and a feu de joie fired by the troops. The settlement was founded in response to British concerns about the possibility of a French colony being established on the coast of Western Australia. On 7 March 1831 it was transferred to the control of the Swan River Colony, and named Albany in 1832.

In 1829 the Swan River Colony was established on the Swan River by Captain James Stirling. By 1832, the British settler population of the colony had reached around 1,500, and the official name of the colony was changed to Western Australia on 6 February that year. The two separate townsites of the colony developed slowly into the port city of Fremantle and the state's capital, Perth. York was the first inland settlement in Western Australia, situated 97 kilometres (60 mi) east of Perth and settled on 16 September 1831. York was the staging point for early explorers who discovered the rich gold reserves of Kalgoorlie.

Population growth was very slow until significant discoveries of gold were made in the 1890s around Kalgoorlie.

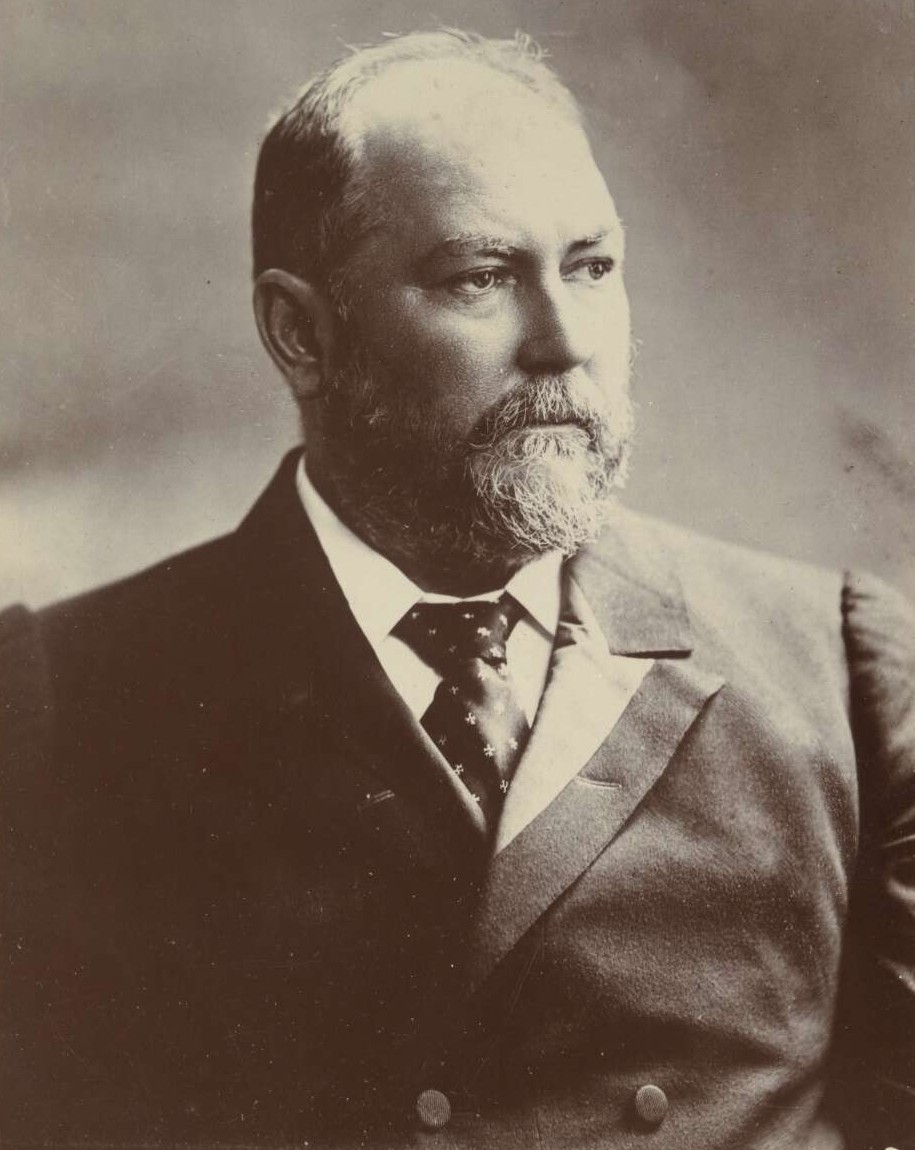
John Forrest was the first Premier of Western Australia.

In 1887, a new constitution was drafted, providing for the right of self-governance of European Australians, and in 1890, the act granting self-government to the colony was passed by the British Parliament. John Forrest became the first Premier of Western Australia.

In 1896, after discoveries of gold at Coolgardie and Kalgoorlie, the Western Australian Parliament authorised the raising of a loan to construct a pipeline to transport 23 megalitres (5 million imperial gallons) of water per day to the burgeoning population on the goldfields. The pipeline, known as the Goldfields Water Supply Scheme, was completed in 1903. C. Y. O'Connor, Western Australia's first engineer-in-chief, designed and oversaw the construction of the pipeline. It carries water 530 km (330 mi) from Perth to Kalgoorlie, and is attributed by historians as an important factor driving the state's population and economic growth.

Following a campaign led by Forrest, electors of the colony of Western Australia voted in favour of federation with the five other Australian colonies, resulting in Western Australia officially becoming a state on 1 January 1901.

=== "West Australia" ===
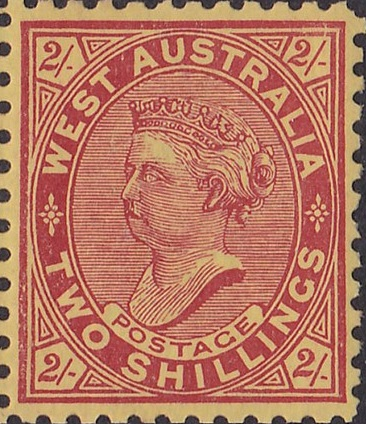
"West Australia" on a 1902 stamp

"West Australia" and its related demonym "West Australian" are occasionally used, including in the names of the main daily newspaper, The West Australian, and the state-based West Australian Football League, but are rarely used in an official sense. The terms "Westralia" and "Westralian" were regularly used in the 19th and 20th century. The terms are still found in the names of certain companies and buildings, e.g. Westralia House in Perth, the skyscraper Westralia Square on St Georges Terrace, and Westralia Airports Corporation, which operates Perth Airport, as well as in the names of several ships.

== Geography ==
Western Australia is bounded to the east nominally by longitude 129°E, the meridian 129 degrees east of Greenwich, although the actual border with South Australia and the Northern Territory (as surveyed and marked or otherwise indicated on the ground) deviates from 129° east and is not a single straight line, and bounded by the Indian Ocean to the west and north. The International Hydrographic Organization (IHO) designates the body of water south of the continent as part of the Indian Ocean; in Australia it is officially gazetted as the Southern Ocean. (Note: In Australia, the body of water south of the continent is officially gazetted as the Southern Ocean, whereas the International Hydrographic Organization (IHO) designates it as part of the Indian Ocean.)

The total length of the state's eastern border is 1,862 km (1,157 mi). There are 20,781 km (12,913 mi) of coastline, including 7,892 km (4,904 mi) of island coastline. The total land area occupied by the state is 2.5 million km^{2} (970 thousand mi^{2}).

=== Geology ===
The bulk of Western Australia consists of the extremely old Yilgarn craton and Pilbara craton which merged with the Deccan Plateau of India, Madagascar and the Kaapvaal and Zimbabwe cratons of Southern Africa, in the Archean Eon to form Ur, one of the oldest supercontinents on Earth (3–3.2 billion years ago). In May 2017, evidence of the earliest known life on land may have been found in 3.48-billion-year-old geyserite and other related mineral deposits (often found around hot springs and geysers) uncovered in the Pilbara craton.

Because the only mountain-building since then has been of the Stirling Range with the rifting from Antarctica, the land is extremely eroded and ancient, with no part of the state above 1,249 metres (4,098 ft) AHD (at Mount Meharry in the Hamersley Range of the Pilbara region). Most of the state is a low plateau with an average elevation of about 400 metres (1,200 ft), very low relief, and no surface runoff. This descends relatively sharply to the coastal plains, in some cases forming a sharp escarpment (as with the Darling Range/Darling Scarp near Perth).

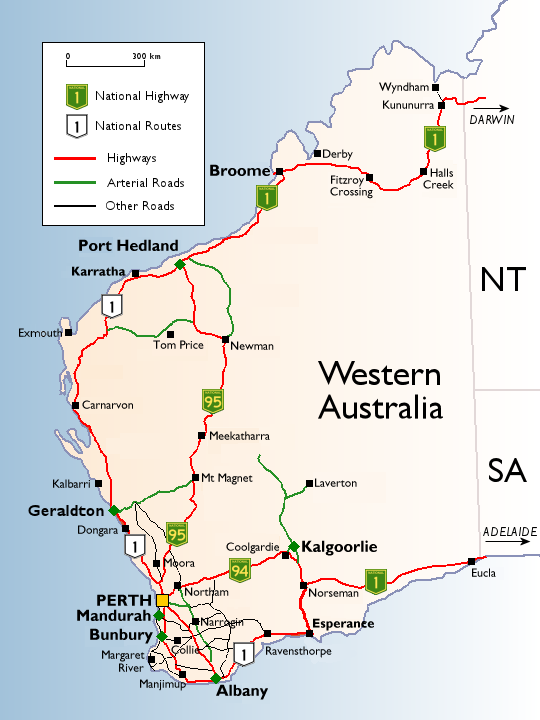
Western Australian cities, towns, settlements and road network

The extreme age of the landscape has meant that the soils are remarkably infertile and frequently laterised. Even soils derived from granitic bedrock contain an order of magnitude less available phosphorus and only half as much nitrogen as soils in comparable climates in other continents. Soils derived from extensive sandplains or ironstone are even less fertile, nearly devoid of soluble phosphate and deficient in zinc, copper, molybdenum and sometimes potassium and calcium.

The infertility of most of the soils has required heavy application by farmers of fertilisers. These have resulted in damage to invertebrate and bacterial populations. The grazing and use of hoofed mammals and, later, heavy machinery through the years have resulted in compaction of soils and great damage to the fragile soils.

Large-scale land clearing for agriculture has damaged habitats for native flora and fauna. As a result, the South West region of the state has a higher concentration of rare, threatened or endangered flora and fauna than many areas of Australia, making it one of the world's biodiversity "hot spots". Large areas of the state's wheatbelt region have problems with dryland salinity and the loss of fresh water.

=== Climate ===
Köppen climate types in Western Australia

The southwest coastal area has a Mediterranean climate. It was originally heavily forested, including large stands of karri, one of the tallest trees in the world. This agricultural region is one of the nine most bio-diverse terrestrial habitats, with a higher proportion of endemic species than most other equivalent regions. Thanks to the offshore Leeuwin Current, the area is one of the top six regions for marine biodiversity and contains the most southerly coral reefs in the world.

Average annual rainfall varies from 300 millimetres (12 in) at the edge of the Wheatbelt region to 1,400 millimetres (55 in) in the wettest areas near Northcliffe, but from November to March, evaporation exceeds rainfall, and it is generally very dry. Plants are adapted to this as well as the extreme poverty of all soils.

The central two-thirds of the state is arid and sparsely inhabited. The only significant economic activity is mining. Annual rainfall averages less than 300 millimetres (8–10 in), most of which occurs in sporadic torrential falls related to cyclone events in summer.

An exception to this is the northern tropical regions. The Kimberley has an extremely hot monsoonal climate with average annual rainfall ranging from 500 to 1,500 millimetres (20–60 in), but there is a very long almost rainless season from April to November. Eighty-five percent of the state's runoff occurs in the Kimberley, but because it occurs in violent floods and because of the insurmountable poverty of the generally shallow soils, the only development has taken place along the Ord River.

Snow is rare in the state and typically occurs only in the Stirling Range near Albany, as it is the only mountain range far enough south and sufficiently elevated. More rarely, snow can fall on the nearby Porongurup Range. Snow outside these areas is a major event; it usually occurs in hilly areas of southwestern Australia. The most widespread low-level snow occurred on 26 June 1956 when snow was reported in the Perth Hills, as far north as Wongan Hills and as far east as Salmon Gums. However, even in the Stirling Range, snowfalls rarely exceed 5 cm (2 in) and rarely settle for more than one day.

The highest observed temperature of 50.7 °C (123.3 °F) was recorded in Onslow on 13 January 2022. The lowest temperature recorded was −7.2 °C (19.0 °F) at Eyre Bird Observatory on 17 August 2008.

The South Geomagnetic Pole is currently tilted 10 degrees away from the South Pole towards Western Australia, allowing for aurora australis displays as far north as Geraldton.

Climate data for Western Australia
Month	Jan	Feb	Mar	Apr	May	Jun	Jul	Aug	Sep	Oct	Nov	Dec	Year
Record high °C (°F)	50.7 (123.3)	50.5 (122.9)	48.1 (118.6)	45.0 (113.0)	40.6 (105.1)	37.8 (100.0)	38.3 (100.9)	41.6 (106.9)	43.1 (109.6)	46.9 (116.4)	48.0 (118.4)	49.8 (121.6)	50.7 (123.3)
Record low °C (°F)	0.9 (33.6)	0.5 (32.9)	−0.8 (30.6)	−2.2 (28.0)	−5.6 (21.9)	−6.0 (21.2)	−6.7 (19.9)	−7.2 (19.0)	−5.1 (22.8)	−5.0 (23.0)	−2.1 (28.2)	0.0 (32.0)	−7.2 (19.0)
Source 1: Bureau of Meteorology
Source 2:

=== Flora and fauna ===
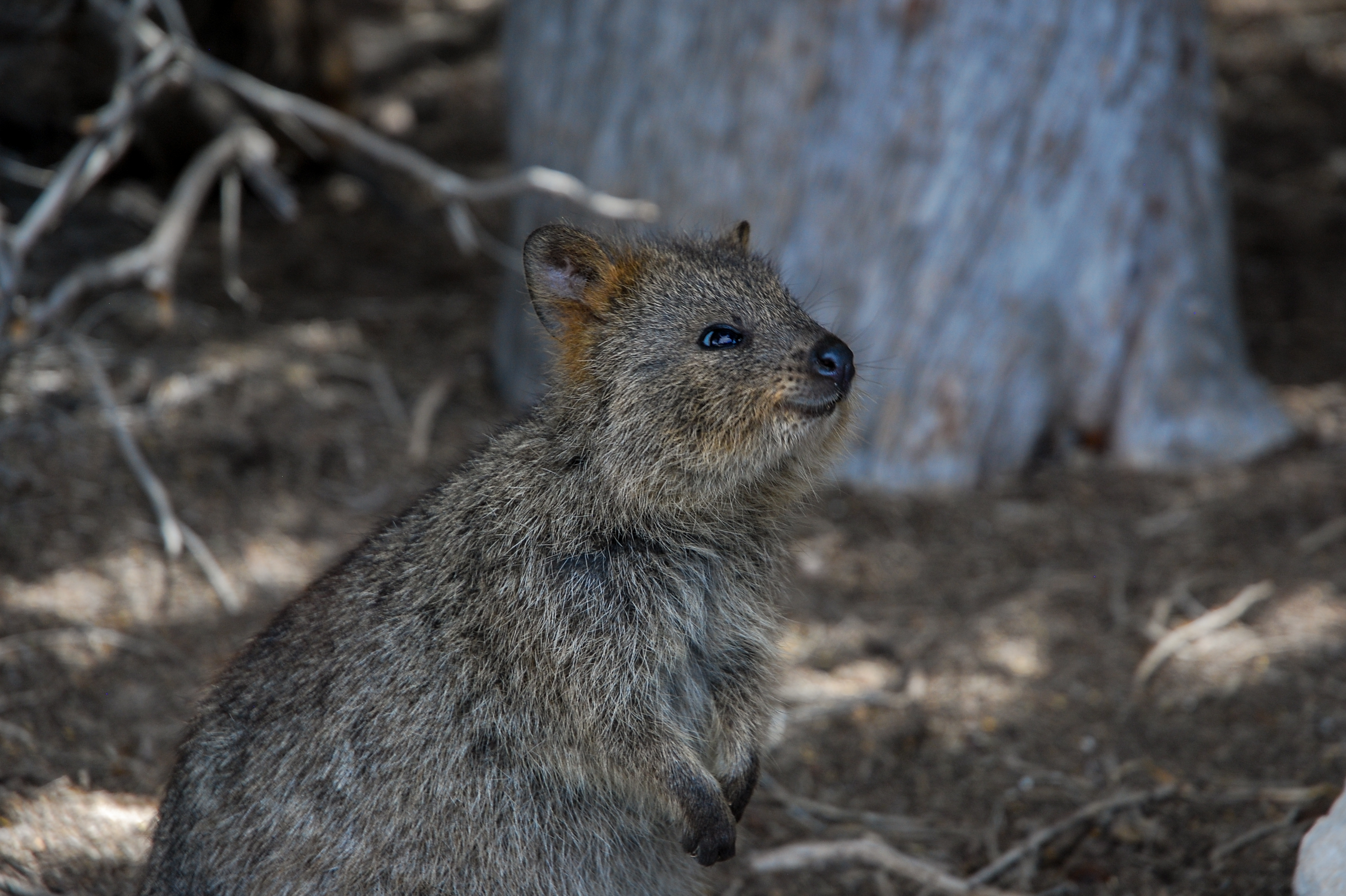
A quokka on Rottnest Island

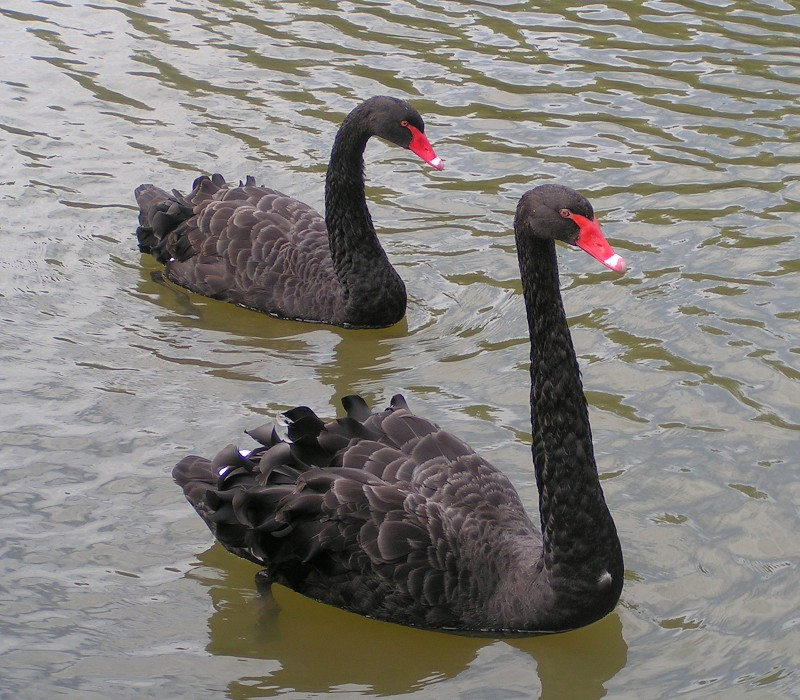
The black swan is the state bird of Western Australia.

Western Australia is home to around 630 species of birds (depending on the taxonomy used). Of these around 15 are endemic to the state. The best areas for birds are the southwestern corner of the state and the area around Broome and the Kimberley.

The flora of Western Australia comprises 10,162 published native vascular plant species, along with a further 1,196 species currently recognised but unpublished. They occur within 1,543 genera from 211 families; there are also 1,276 naturalised alien or invasive plant species. In the southwest region are some of the largest numbers of plant species for its area in the world.

Western Australia's ecoregions include the sandstone gorges of the Kimberley on the northern coast, and below that the drier Victoria Plains tropical savanna inland, and the semi-desert Pilbara shrublands, Carnarvon xeric shrublands, and Western Australian mulga shrublands to the southwest. Southwards along the coast are the Southwest Australia savanna and the Swan Coastal Plain around Perth, with the Jarrah-Karri forest and shrublands on the southwest corner of the coast around the Margaret River wine-growing area. Going east along the Southern Ocean coast is the Goldfields-Esperance region, including the Esperance mallee and the Coolgardie woodlands inland around town of Coolgardie. Deserts occupy the interior, including the Great Sandy-Tanami desert, Gibson Desert, Great Victoria Desert, and Nullarbor Plain.

In 1831, Scottish botanist Robert Brown produced a scientific paper, titled General view of the botany of the vicinity of Swan River. It discusses the vegetation of the Swan River Colony.

== Demographics ==
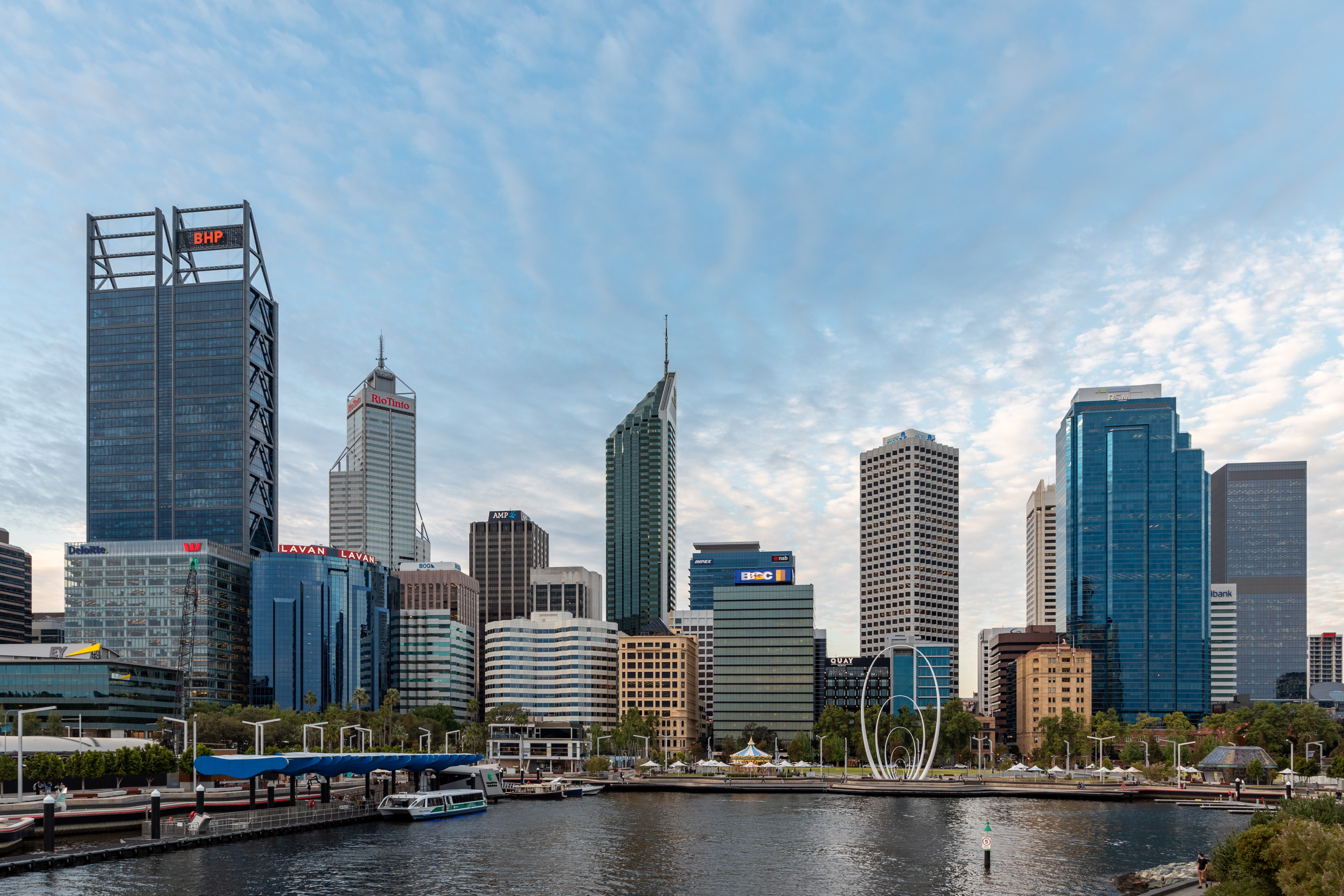
The metropolitan area of Western Australia's capital and largest city, Perth, is home to more than 80% of the state's population.

Population growth 1829–2010

Europeans began to settle permanently in 1826 when Albany was claimed by Britain to forestall French claims to the western third of the continent. Perth was founded as the Swan River Colony in 1829 by British and Irish settlers, though the outpost languished. Its officials eventually requested convict labour to augment its population. By the time transportation ceased in 1868, convicts outnumbered free settlers 9,700 to 7,300. In the 1890s, interstate immigration, resulting from a mining boom in the Goldfields region, resulted in a sharp population increase.

Western Australia did not receive significant flows of immigrants from Britain, Ireland or elsewhere in the British Empire until the early 20th century. At that time, its local projects—such as the Group Settlement Scheme of the 1920s, which encouraged farmers to settle the southwest—increased awareness of Australia's western third as a destination for colonists.

Led by immigrants from the British Isles, Western Australia's population developed at a faster rate during the twentieth century than it had previously. After World War II, both the eastern states and Western Australia received large numbers of Italians, Croatians and Macedonians. Despite this, Britain has contributed the greatest number of immigrants to this day. Western Australia—particularly Perth—has the highest proportion of British-born of any state: 10.3% in 2011, compared to a national average of 5.1%. This group is heavily concentrated in certain parts, where they account for a quarter of the population.

Perth's metropolitan area (including Mandurah) had an estimated population of 2,043,138 in June 2017 (79% of the state). Other significant population centres include Bunbury (73,989), Geraldton (37,961), Kalgoorlie-Boulder (30,420), Albany (33,998), Karratha (16,446), Broome (14,501) and Port Hedland (14,285).

=== Ancestry and immigration ===
Country of birth (2016)
Birthplace (Note: In accordance with the Australian Bureau of Statistics source, England, Scotland, Mainland China and the Special Administrative Regions of Hong Kong and Macau are listed separately)	Population
Australia	1,492,842
England	194,163
New Zealand	79,221
India	49,385
South Africa	41,008
Philippines	30,835
Malaysia	29,126
Mainland China	27,126
Scotland	26,063
Italy	19,210

At the 2016 census, the most commonly nominated ancestries were: (Note: As a percentage of 2,286,107 persons who nominated their ancestry at the 2016 census.)

- English (40.7%)
- Australian (33.2%) (Note: The Australian Bureau of Statistics has stated that most who nominate "Australian" as their ancestry are part of the Anglo-Celtic group.)
- Irish (9.8%)
- Scottish (9.4%)
- Italian (5.4%)
- Chinese (4.5%)
- German (3.2%)
- Indigenous (3.1%) (Note: Of any ancestry. Includes those identifying as Aboriginal Australians or Torres Strait Islanders. Indigenous identification is separate to the ancestry question on the Australian Census and persons identifying as Aboriginal or Torres Strait Islander may identify any ancestry.)
- Indian (3%)
- Dutch (2.1%)
- Filipino (1.6%)
- New Zealander (1.4%)
- South African (1.3%)
- Maori (1.2%)

3.1% of the population, or 75,978 people, identified as Indigenous Australians (Aboriginal Australians and Torres Strait Islanders) in 2016.

=== Language ===
At the 2016 census, 75.2% of inhabitants spoke only English at home, with the next most common languages being Mandarin (1.9%), Italian (1.2%), Vietnamese (0.8%), Cantonese (0.8%) and Tagalog (0.6%).

=== Religion ===
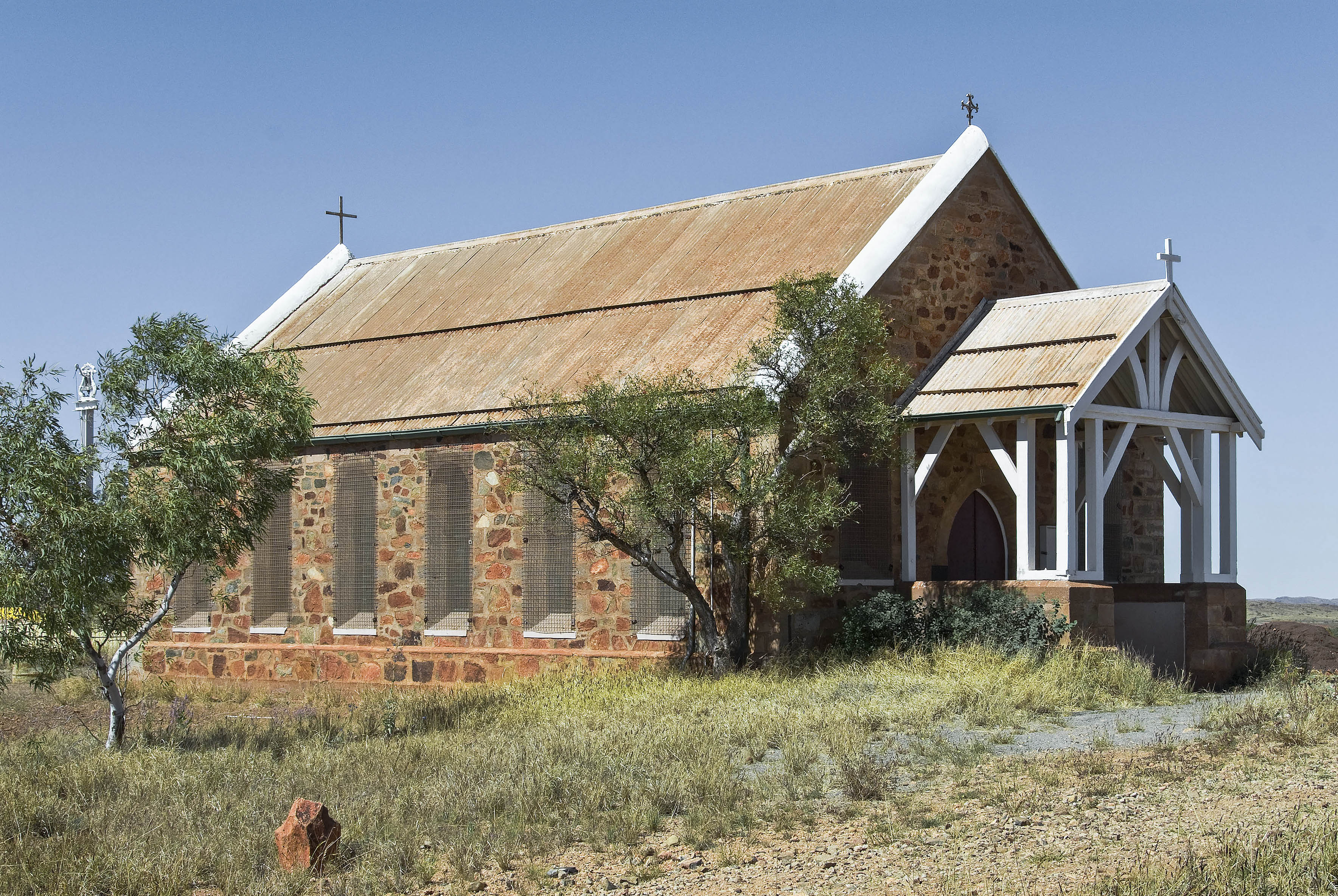
Holy Trinity Anglican Church in Roebourne

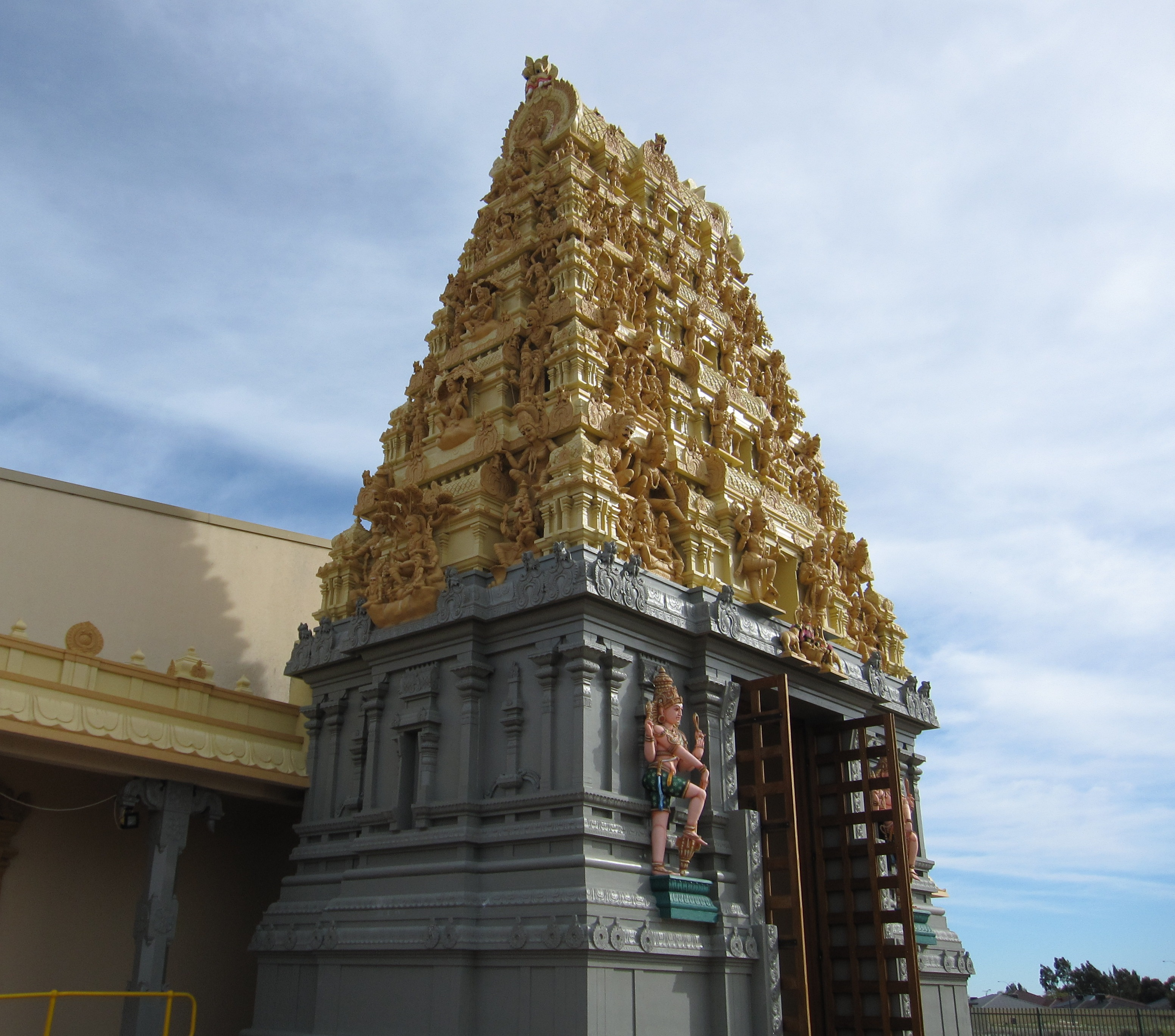
Perth Shiva Temple, major Hindu temple in Western Australia

According to the 2021 census, Christianity is the major religious affiliation in WA, followed by 41.1% of its population. In 1971, Christianity was followed by 85.5% of the population and it has been declining since, while the percentage of people who identified as having no religious affiliation has increased from 8.7% in 1971 to 42.9% in 2021. A small minority of the population are Muslims (2.5%), Buddhists (2.2%) and Hindus (2.0%).

== Economy ==
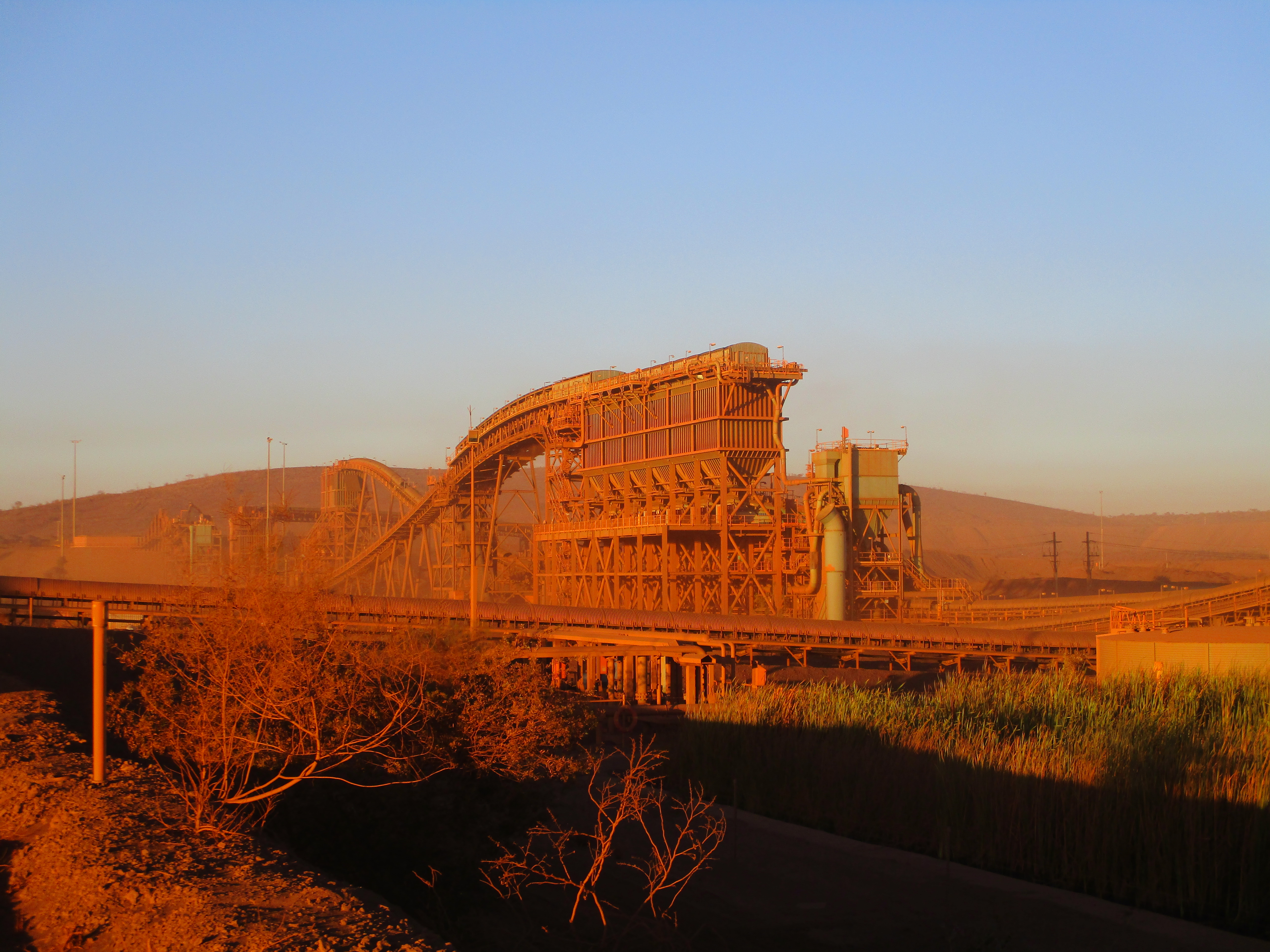
Brockman 4, an iron ore mine in the Pilbara

Western Australia's resource commodity mix, 2007

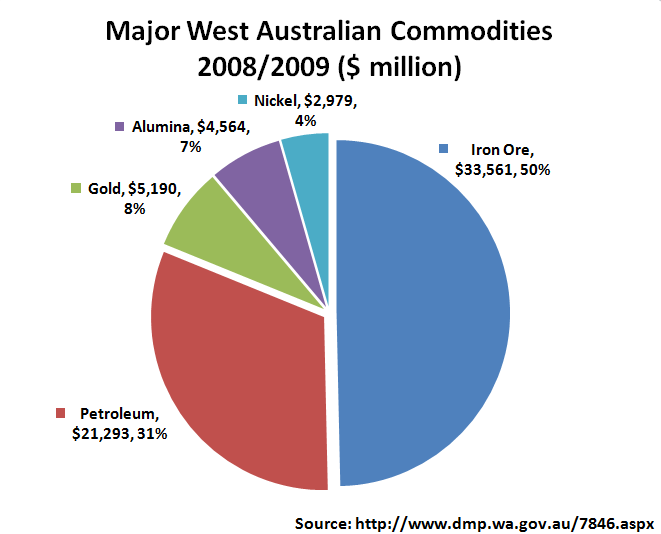
Major commodity mix, 2008–2009

Western Australia's economy is largely driven by extraction and processing of a diverse range of mineral and petroleum commodities. The structure of the economy is closely linked to these natural resources, providing a comparative advantage in resource extraction and processing. As a consequence:

- Western Australia contributes an estimated 58% of Australia's Mineral and Energy Exports, potentially earning up to 4.64% of Australia's total GDP.
- Gross state product per person ($97,940 in 2017–18) is higher than any other state and well above the national average ($73,267).
- Diversification (i.e. a greater range of commodities) over the past 15 years has provided a more balanced production base and less reliance on just a few major export markets, insulating the economy from fluctuations in world prices to some extent.
- Finance, insurance and property services and construction have grown steadily and have increased their share of economic output.
- Recent growth in global demand for minerals and petroleum, especially in China (iron-ore) and Japan (for LNG), has ensured economic growth above the national average.

In 2019 Western Australia's overseas exports accounted for 46% of the nation's total. The state's major export commodities included iron-ore, petroleum, gold, alumina, nickel, wheat, copper, lithium, chemicals and mineral sands.

Western Australia is the world's largest iron-ore producer (34% of the world's total), and extracts 66% (6.9% of world production) of Australia's 306 tonnes (9.8 million troy ounces) of gold in 2022. It is a major world producer of bauxite, which is processed into alumina at four refineries providing 11% of total world production. Until 2020 diamonds were extracted from the world's largest diamond mine in the far north Kimberley region. Coal mined at Collie is the main fuel for baseload electricity generation in the state's south-west.

Agricultural production in WA is a major contributor to the state and national economy. In the period 2010–2019 wheat production in WA has averaged nearly 10 million tonnes (22 billion pounds), valued at $2.816 billion in 2019, accounting for half the nation's total and providing $2–3 billion in export income.

Other significant farm output includes wool, beef, lamb, barley, canola, lupins, oats and pulses. There is a high level of overseas demand for live animals from WA, driven mainly by southeast Asia's feedlots and Middle Eastern countries, where Islamic dietary laws and a lack of storage and refrigeration facilities favour live animals over imports of processed meat. About half of Australia's live cattle exports come from Western Australia.

Resource sector growth in recent years has resulted in significant labour and skills shortages, leading to recent efforts by the state government to encourage interstate and overseas immigration. According to the 2006 census, the median individual income was A$500 per week in Western Australia (compared to A$466 in Australia as a whole). The median family income was A$1246 per week (compared to A$1171 for Australia). Recent growth has also contributed to significant rises in average property values in 2006, although values plateaued in 2007.

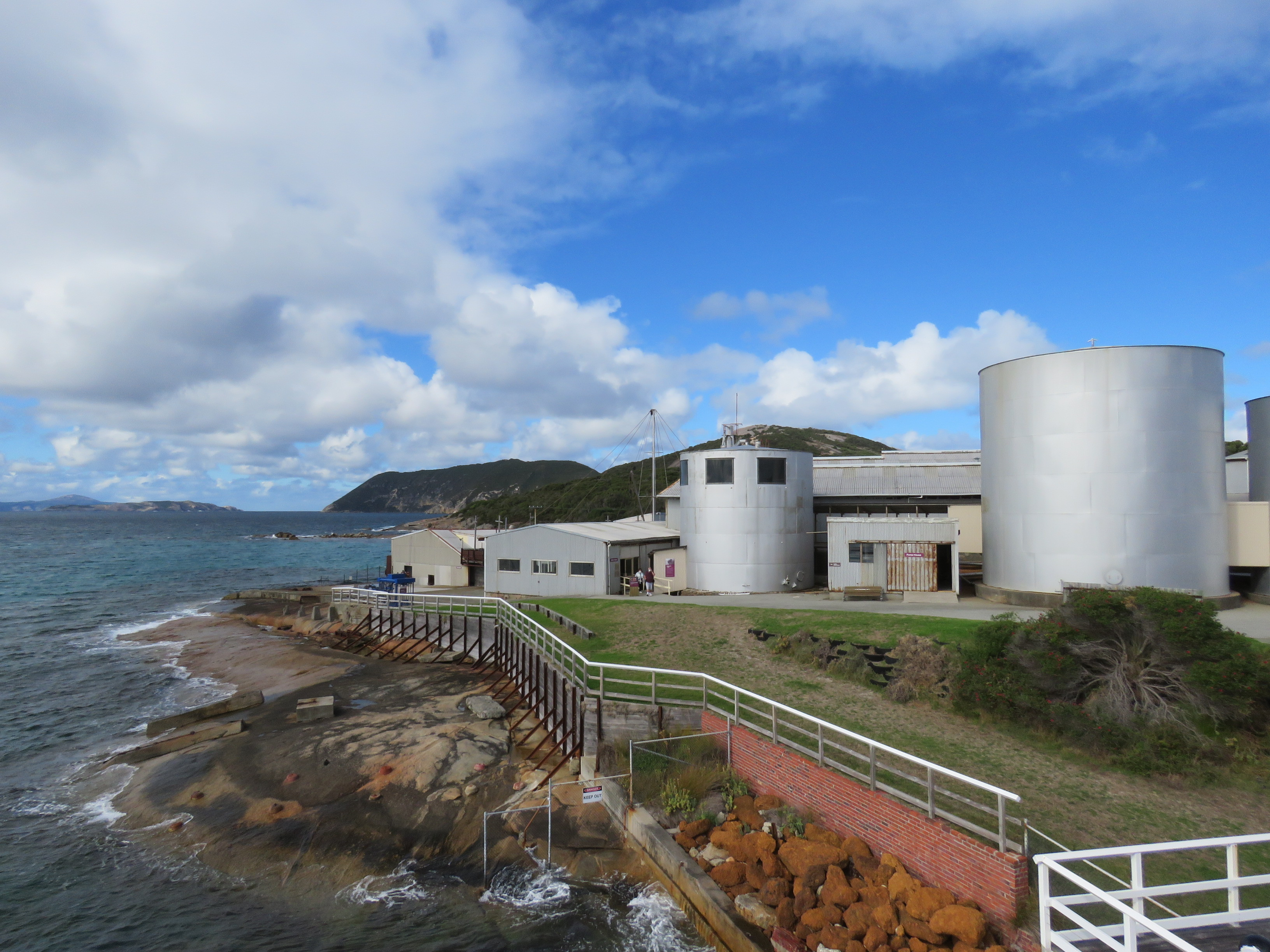
Albany's Historic Whaling Station

Located south of Perth, the heavy industrial area of Kwinana had the nation's largest oil refinery with a capacity of 23,200 cubic metres per day (146,000 barrels per day) until its closure in 2021, producing most of the state's petrol and diesel. Kwinana also hosts alumina and nickel processing plants, port facilities for grain and other bulk exports, and support industries for mining and petroleum such as heavy and light engineering, and metal fabrication. Shipbuilding (e.g. Austal) and associated support industries are found at nearby Henderson, just north of Kwinana. Significant secondary industries include cement and building product manufacturing, flour milling, food processing, animal feed production, automotive body building and printing.

Western Australia has a significant fishing industry. Products for local consumption and export include western rock lobsters, prawns, crabs, shark and tuna, as well as pearl fishing in the Kimberley region of the state. Processing is conducted along the west coast. Whaling was a key marine industry but ceased at Albany in 1978.

Western Australia has the world's biggest plantations of both Indian sandalwood (northern WA) and Australian sandalwood (semi-arid regions), which are used to produce sandalwood oil and incense. The WA sandalwood industry provides about 40% of the international sandalwood oil market.

=== Tourism ===
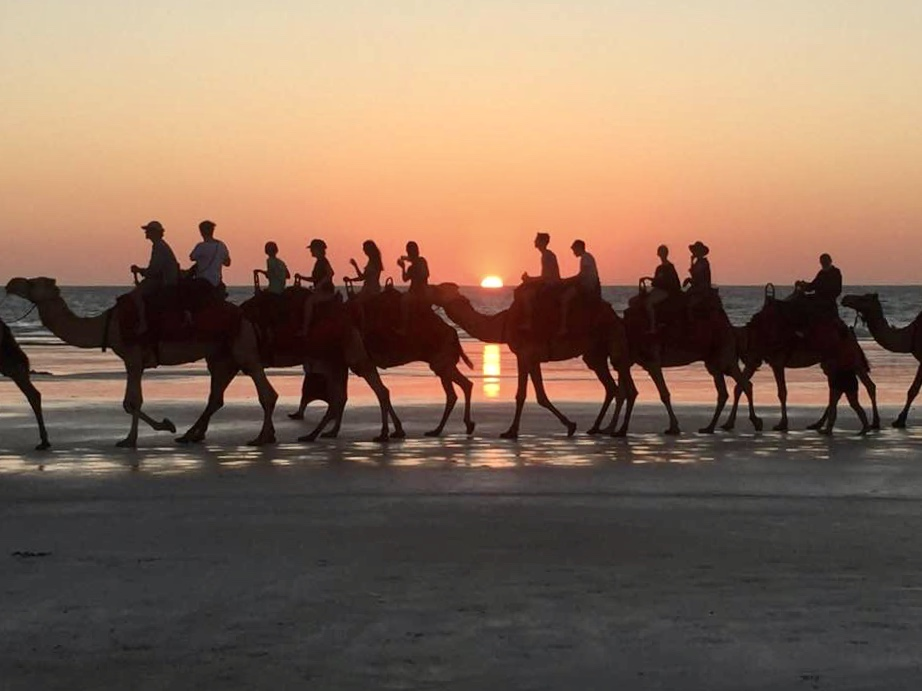
Camel rides are a popular tourist activity at Cable Beach in Broome.

In the 2000s, tourism grew in importance, with significant numbers of visitors to the state in 2008 coming from the UK and Ireland (28%), other European countries (14%) Singapore (16%), Japan (10%) and Malaysia (8%). Revenue from tourism is a strong economic driver in many of the smaller population centres outside of Perth, especially in coastal locations.

Tourism forms a major part of the Western Australian economy with 833,100 international visitors making up 12.8% of the total international tourism to Australia in the year ending March 2015. The top three source markets include the United Kingdom (17%), Singapore (10%), and New Zealand (10%) with the majority of purpose for visitation being holiday/vacation reasons. The tourism industry contributes $9.3 billion to the Western Australian economy and supports 94,000 jobs within the state. Both directly and indirectly, the industry makes up 3.2% of the state's economy whilst comparatively, WA's largest revenue source, the mining sector, brings in 31%.

Tourism WA is the government agency responsible for promoting Western Australia as a holiday destination.

== Government ==
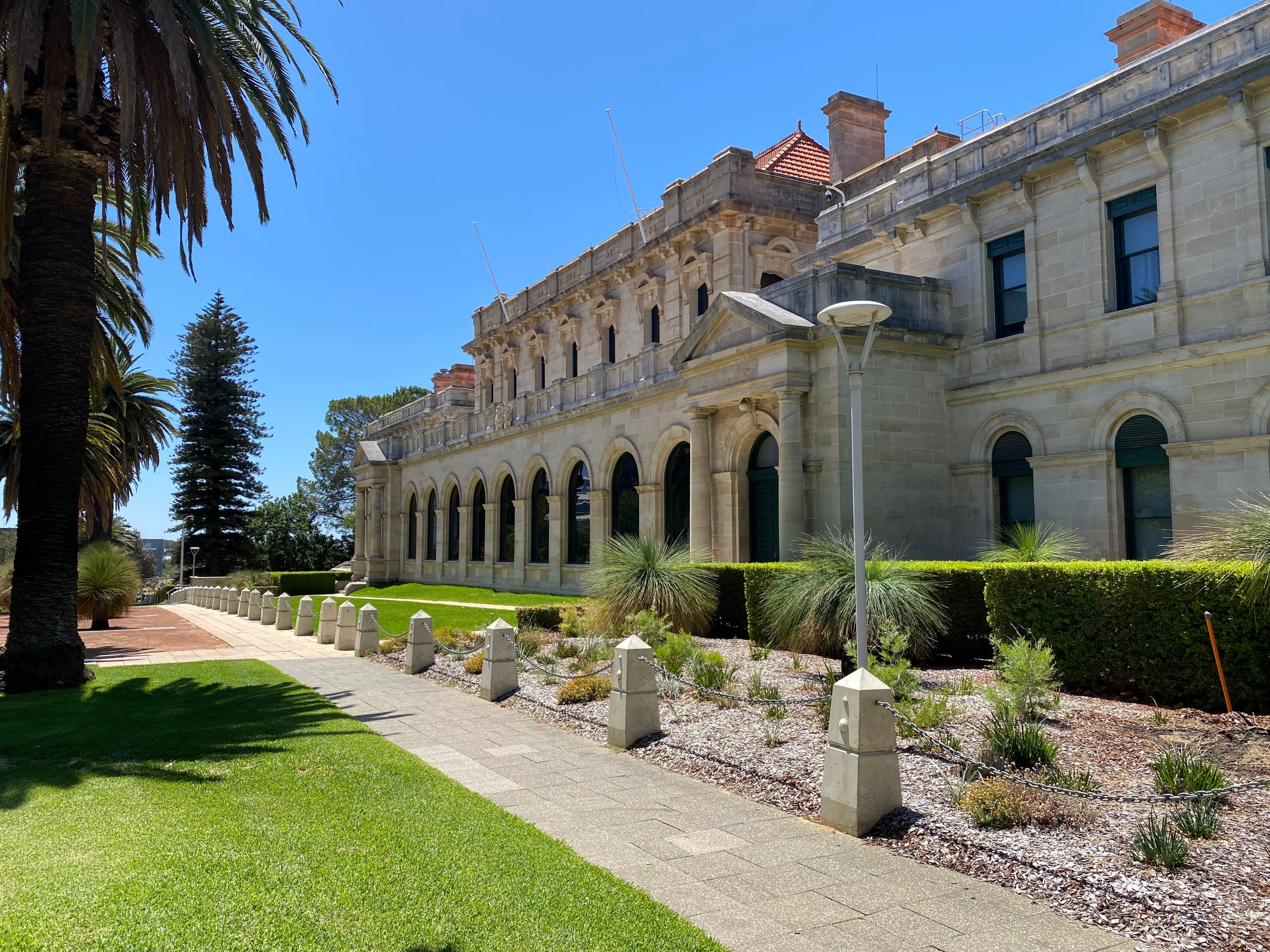
Parliament House

Western Australia was granted self-government in 1890 with a bicameral Parliament located in Perth, consisting of the Legislative Assembly (or lower house), which has 59 members; and the Legislative Council (or upper house), which has 36 members. Suffrage is universal and compulsory for citizens over 18 years of age.

With the federation of the Australian colonies in 1901, Western Australia became a state within Australia's federal structure; this involved ceding certain powers to the Commonwealth (or Federal) government in accordance with the Constitution; all powers not specifically granted to the Commonwealth remained solely with the State. However over time the Commonwealth has effectively expanded its powers through broad interpretation of its enumerated powers and increasing control of taxation and financial distribution (see Federalism in Australia).

Whilst the sovereign of Western Australia is the monarch of Australia (currently Charles III) and executive power is nominally vested in his or her state representative, the Governor (currently Chris Dawson), executive power rests with the premier and ministers drawn from the party or coalition of parties holding a majority of seats in the Legislative Assembly. Roger Cook is the premier, having succeeded Mark McGowan after his resignation in June 2023.

=== Secession ===
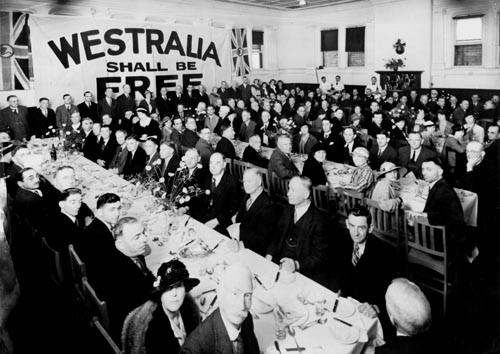
A 1933 meeting of the Dominion League in support of secession

Secessionism has been a recurring feature of Western Australia's political landscape since shortly after European settlement in 1826. Western Australia was the most reluctant participant in the Commonwealth of Australia. Western Australia did not participate in the earliest federation conference. Longer-term residents of Western Australia were generally opposed to federation; however, the discovery of gold brought many immigrants from other parts of Australia. It was these residents, primarily in Kalgoorlie but also in Albany who voted to join the Commonwealth, and the proposal of these areas being admitted separately under the name Auralia was considered.

In a referendum in April 1933, 68% of voters voted for the state to leave the Commonwealth of Australia with the aim of returning to the British Empire as an autonomous territory. The State Government sent a delegation to Westminster, but the British Government ruled that after the Statute of Westminster 1931, it no longer had the authority to amend the constitution of Australia without the consent of its federal government; the British Government took no action.

=== Local government ===
Western Australia is divided into 139 Local Government Areas, including Christmas Island and the Cocos (Keeling) Islands. Their mandate and operations are governed by the Local Government Act 1995.

== Education ==
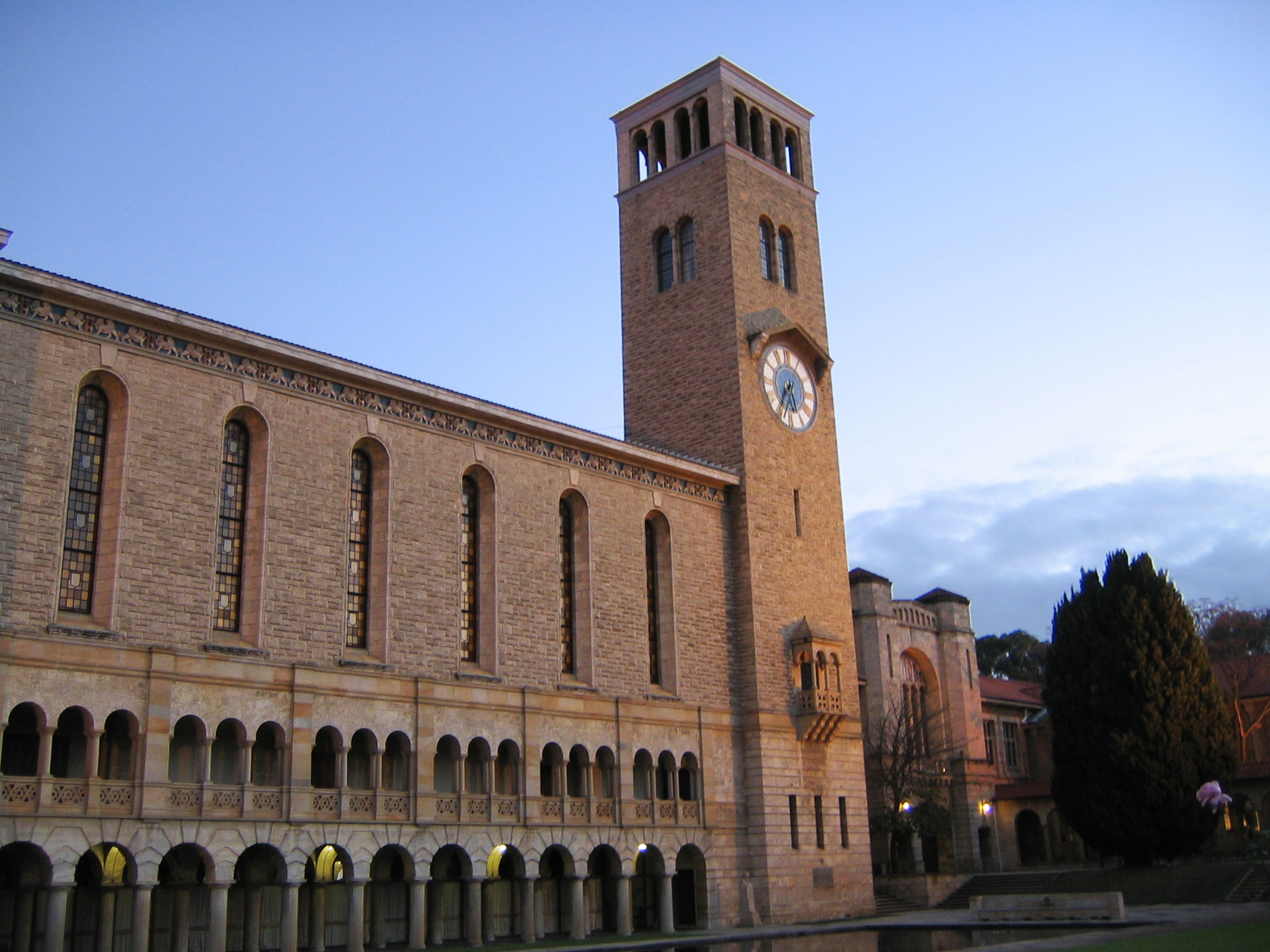
University of Western Australia

Education in Western Australia consists of one year of pre-school at age 4 or 5, followed by six years of primary education for all students as of 2015. At age 12 or 13, students begin six years of secondary education. Students are required to attend school up until they are 16 years old. 16- and 17-year-olds are required to be enrolled in school or a training organisation, be employed or be in a combination of school/training/employment. Students have the option to study at a TAFE college after Year 10, or continue through to Year 12 with vocational courses or university entrance courses.

There are five universities in Western Australia. They consist of four Perth-based public universities, being the University of Western Australia, Curtin University, Edith Cowan University and Murdoch University; and one Fremantle-based private Roman Catholic university, the University of Notre Dame Australia. The University of Notre Dame is also one of only two private universities in Australia, along with Bond University, a not-for-profit private education provider based in Gold Coast, Queensland.

== Media ==
=== Print ===
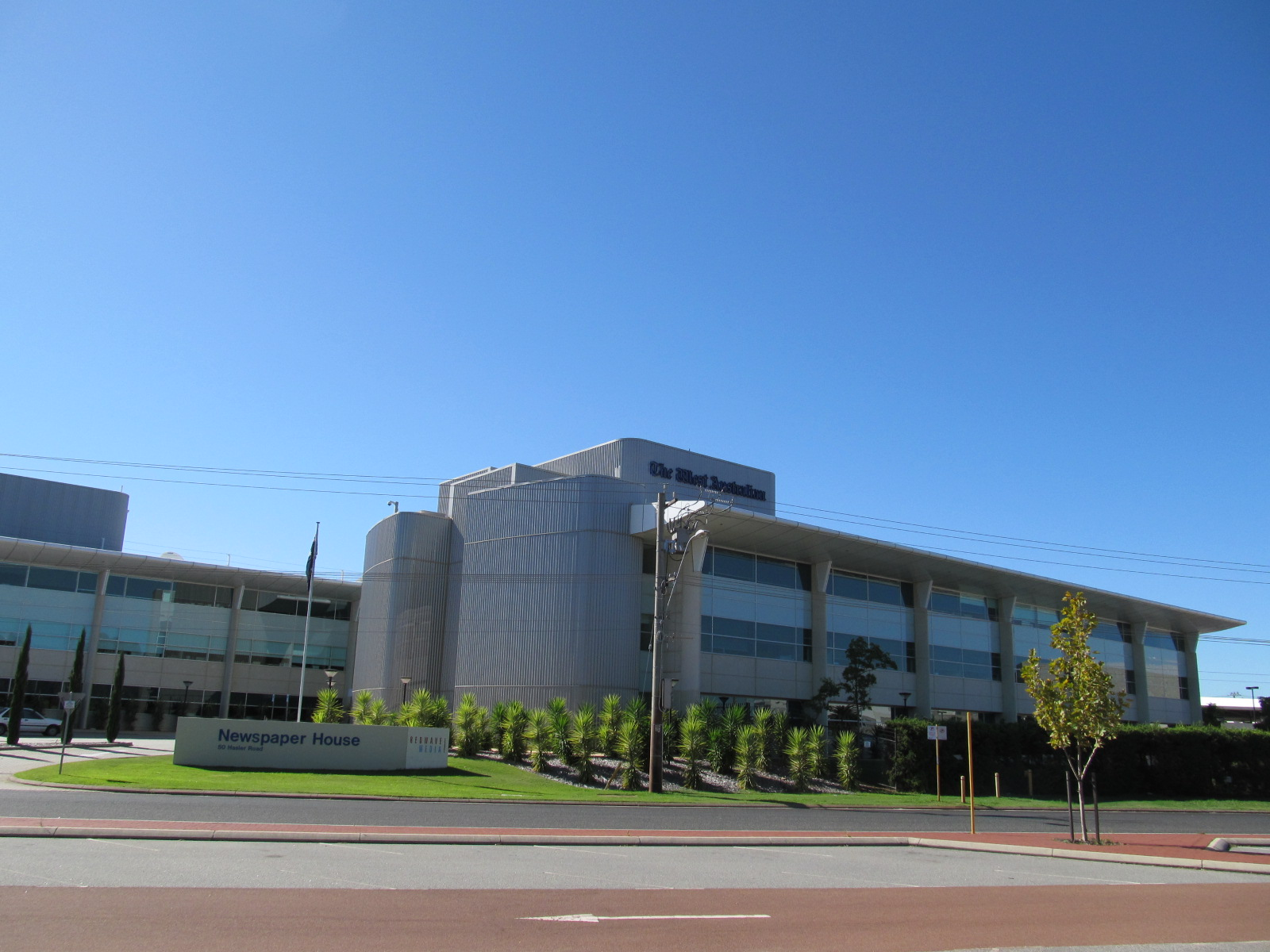
Seven West Media's Newspaper House, where The West Australian newspaper is produced

Western Australia has two daily newspapers: the Seven West Media-owned tabloid The West Australian and the Kalgoorlie Miner. Also published is one weekend paper, The Weekend West, and one Sunday tabloid newspaper, which is also owned by Seven West Media after purchase from News Corporation's The Sunday Times. There are also 17 weekly community newspapers with distribution from Yanchep in the north to Mandurah in the south. There are two major weekly rural papers in the state, Countryman and the Australian Community Media-owned Farm Weekly. The national broadsheet publication The Australian is also available, although with sales per capita lagging far behind those in other states. WAtoday is an online newspaper owned by Nine Entertainment, focusing its coverage on Perth and Western Australia.

=== Television ===
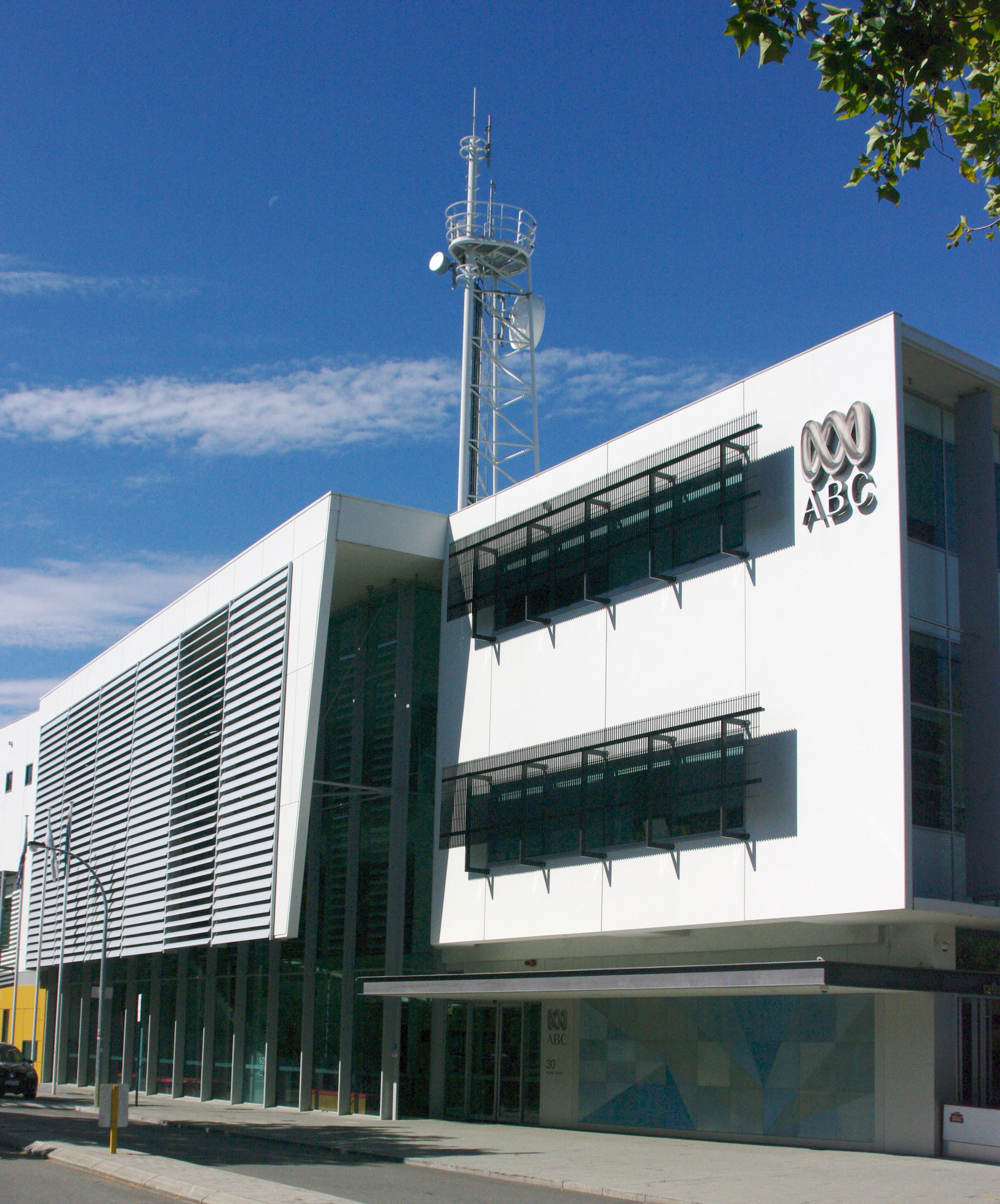
ABC studios in East Perth

Metropolitan Perth has five broadcast television stations;

- ABC TV WA. (Callsign: ABW – Channel 12 Digital)
- SBS TV WA. (Callsign: SBS – was on Channel 29 Digital – now Channel 7 Digital since the 2013 retune)
- Seven Network Perth. (Callsign: TVW – Channel 6 Digital)
- Nine Network Perth. (Callsign: STW – Channel 8 Digital)
- Network Ten Perth. (Callsign: NEW – Channel 11 Digital)
- Perth formerly had West TV, a free-to-air community television channel that began broadcasting in April 2010 and ceased broadcasting in February 2020. It replaced Access 31, which began broadcasting in June 1999 and ceased broadcasting in August 2008.

Regional WA has a similar availability of stations as Perth. Geographically, it is one of the largest television markets in the world, including almost one-third of the continent.

- Golden West Network (GWN7). Owned by Seven West Media. (Callsigns: SSW South West, VEW Goldfields/Esperance, GTW Central West, WAW remote areas.)
- WIN Television WA. Affiliated with Nine (Callsign: WOW.)
- West Digital Television. Affiliated with Ten (Callsigns: SDW South West, VDW Goldfields/Esperance, GDW Central West, WDW remote areas)
- Regional WA used to have Westlink. An open-narrowcast community-based television channel that was only on satellite until Westlink's discontinuation in 2018. (Satellite only.)

In addition, broadcasters operate digital multichannels:

- ABC HD (Carried by ABW)
- ABC TV Plus (Carried by ABW)
- ABC Me (Carried by ABW)
- ABC News (Carried by ABW)
- SBS HD (Carried by SBS)
- SBS Viceland (Carried by SBS)
- SBS World Movies (Carried by SBS)
- SBS Food (Carried by SBS)
- NITV (Carried by SBS)
- SBS WorldWatch (Carried by SBS)
- 7HD (Carried by TVW)
- 7TWO (Carried by TVW and affiliates)
- 7mate (Carried by TVW and affiliates)
- 7flix (Carried by TVW)
- 7Bravo (Carried by TVW)
- Racing.com (Carried by TVW and affiliates)
- 9HD (Carried by STW and affiliates)
- 9Gem (Carried by STW and affiliates)
- 9Go! (Carried by STW and affiliates)
- 9Life (Carried by STW and affiliates)
- 9Rush (Carried by STW)
- Extra (Carried by STW)
- 10 Bold (Carried by NEW and affiliate)
- 10 Peach (Carried by NEW and affiliate)
- 10 Shake (Carried by NEW)
- 10 HD (Carried by NEW and affiliate)
- TVSN (Carried by NEW and affiliate)
- You.tv (Carried by NEW)
- Gecko TV (Carried by NEW)

Pay TV services are provided by Foxtel, which acquired many of the assets and all the remaining subscribers of the insolvent Galaxy Television satellite service in 1998. Some metropolitan suburbs are serviced by pay TV via cable; however, most of the metropolitan and rural areas can only access pay TV via satellite.

=== Radio ===
Perth has many radio stations on both AM and FM frequencies, as well as DAB+ multiplexes. ABC stations include ABC NewsRadio (6PB 585 AM), ABC Radio Perth (6WF 720 AM), Radio National (6RN 810 AM), ABC Classic (6ABC 97.7FM) and Triple J (6JJJ 99.3FM). The six commercial stations are: Triple M (6PPM), Nova 93.7 (6PER), Mix 94.5 (6MIX), Gold 96FM (6NOW) and AM 882 (6PR), AM 1080 (6IX) and AM 1116 (6MM)

The leading community radio stations are Curtin FM 100.1, 6RTR FM 92.1, Sonshine FM 98.5 (6SON) and 91.3 SportFM (6WSM).

== Culture ==
=== Arts and entertainment ===
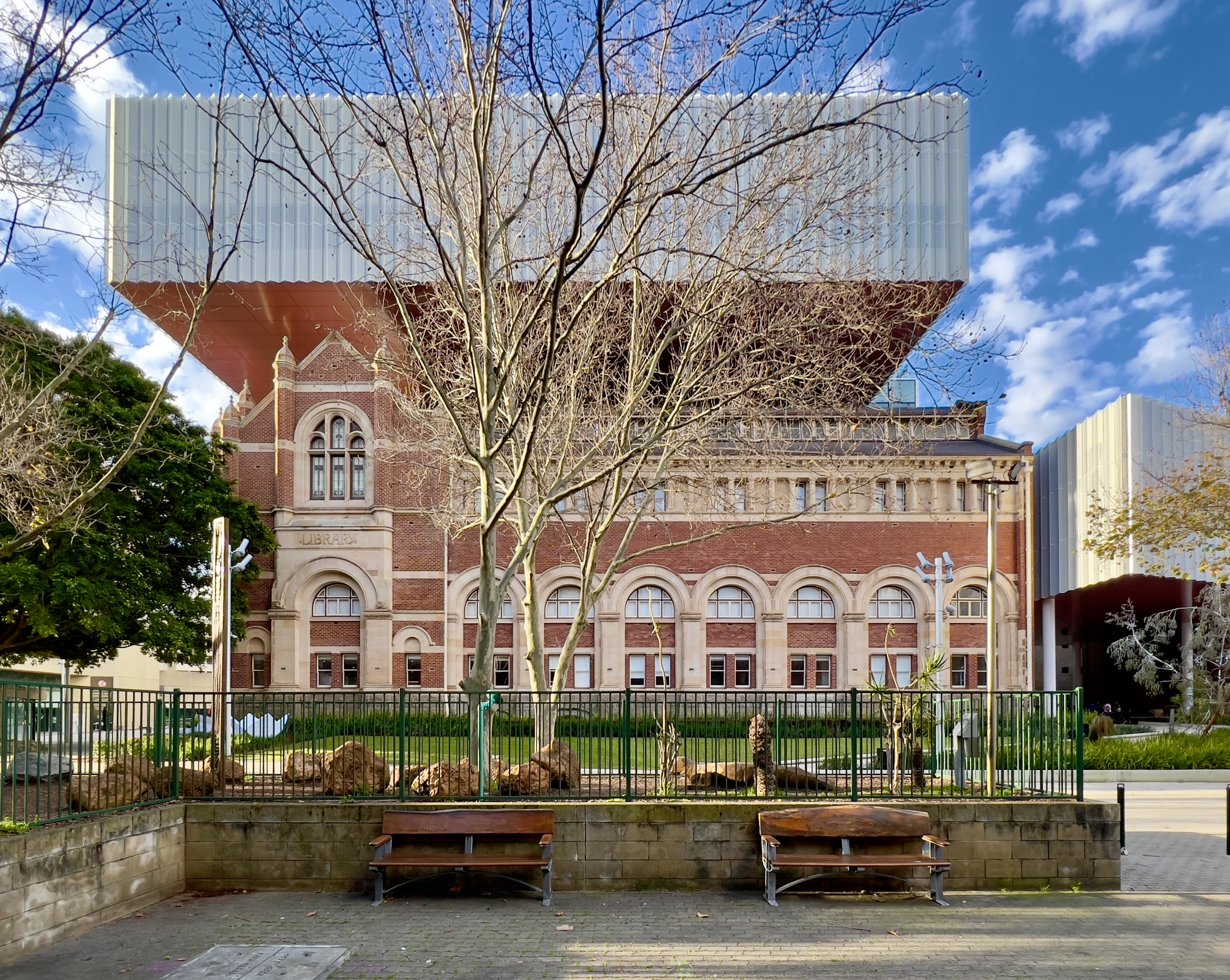
WA Museum Boola Bardip

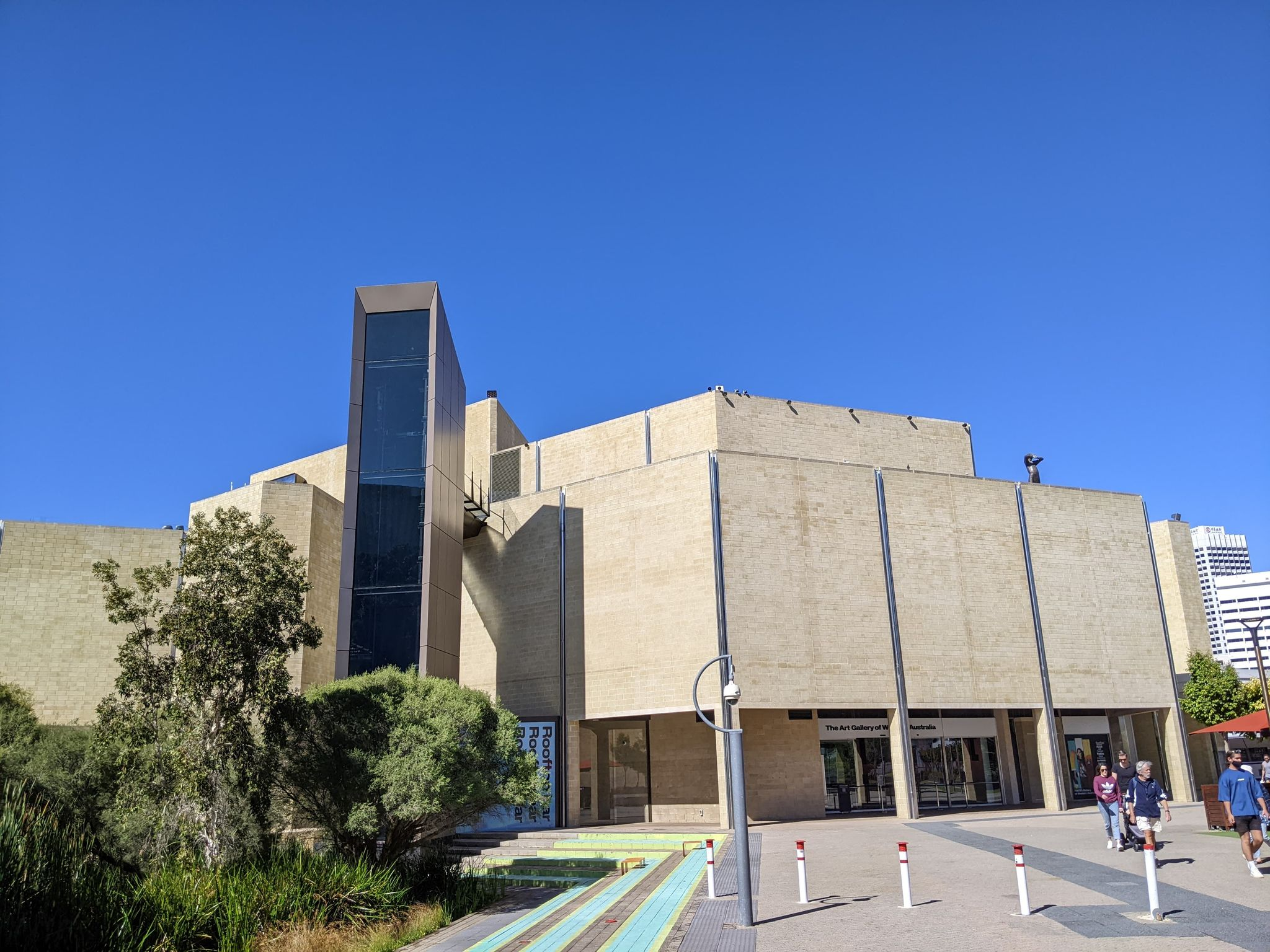
Art Gallery of Western Australia

Western Australia is home to the Western Australian Academy of Performing Arts. Notable musicians and bands to have been born in or lived in Western Australia include Adam Brand, Ammonia, Karnivool, Birds of Tokyo, Bon Scott, Eskimo Joe, Johnny Young, Gyroscope, the John Butler Trio, Tame Impala, Kevin Mitchell, Tim Minchin, Troye Sivan, the Kill Devil Hills, Pendulum, the Pigram Brothers, Rolf Harris, Stella Donnelly and the Triffids. The West Australian Music Industry Awards (WAMis) have been awarded annually since 2001 to musicians and performers in Western Australia.

Notable actors and television personalities from Western Australia include Heath Ledger, Sam Worthington, Ernie Dingo, Jessica Marais, Megan Gale, Rove McManus, Isla Fisher, and Melissa George. Films and television series filmed or partly filmed in Western Australia include Rabbit-Proof Fence, The Heights, Mystery Road, These Final Hours, Cloudstreet, Jasper Jones, Australia, Bran Nu Dae, Red Dog, ABBA: the Movie and Last Train to Freo.

Noted Western Australian Indigenous painters and artisans include Jack Dale Mengenen, Paddy Bedford, Queenie McKenzie, and siblings Nyuju Stumpy Brown and Rover Thomas.

The West Australian Symphony Orchestra is based at the Perth Concert Hall. Other concert, performance and indoor sporting venues in Western Australia include His Majesty's Theatre, the State Theatre Centre of Western Australia, the Crown Theatre and Perth Arena, which opened in 2012. Performing arts companies based in Perth include the West Australian Ballet, the West Australian Opera, the Black Swan State Theatre Company and the Perth Theatre Company.

Western Australia has served as the setting for a number of works of Australian literature. Prominent authors include Katharine Susannah Prichard, Randolph Stow, Tim Winton, Kim Scott, Sally Morgan, Joan London, Mary Durack and Craig Silvey.

The public Art Gallery of Western Australia is part of the Perth Cultural Centre. Founded in 1895, it houses the State Art Collection, comprising works from local and international artists, dating back to the 1800s. The Perth Cultural Centre is also home to the Western Australian Museum, State Library of Western Australia, State Records Office, and Perth Institute of Contemporary Arts. Western Australia has a public library system, with libraries in every local government area (although some public libraries are shared school libraries).

=== Sport ===
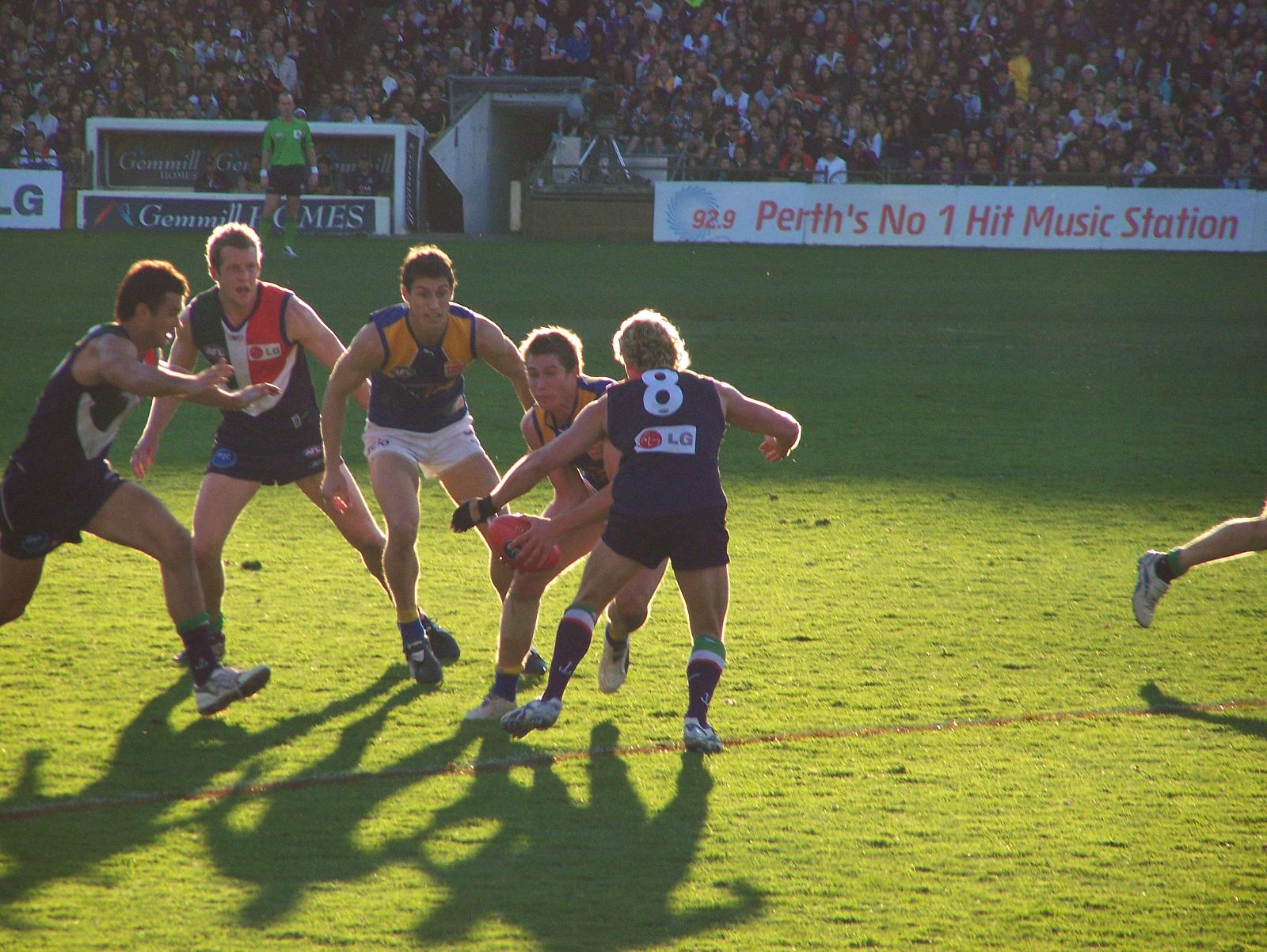
Matches between the two Western Australian teams, the West Coast Eagles and the Fremantle Dockers, are known as the Western Derby.

A number of national or international sporting teams and events are based in the state, including:

- Australian rules football: The West Coast Eagles and the Fremantle Dockers compete in the Australian Football League (AFL). They also have women's teams playing in the AFL Women's league. The West Australian Football League is the main local football competition, but other local and amateur football leagues exist across the state.
- Baseball: The Perth Heat compete in the Australian Baseball League.
- Basketball: The Perth Wildcats (men) and Perth Lynx (women) compete in the National Basketball League and Women's National Basketball League, respectively.
- Cricket: Western Australia represent the state in first-class and List A domestic cricket, with the Perth Scorchers competing in the Twenty20 Big Bash League.
- Field hockey: The Thundersticks (men) and Diamonds (women) compete in the Australian Hockey League.
- Ice hockey: The Perth Thunder (men) and Perth Inferno (women) compete in Australian Ice Hockey League.
- Netball: The West Coast Fever compete in the ANZ Championship.
- Rugby league: The West Coast Pirates compete in the S. G. Ball Cup.
- Rugby union: The Western Force competes in Super Rugby Pacific.
- Soccer: Perth Glory field men's and women's teams in the A-League Men and A-League Women, respectively.
- Tennis: The ITF Hopman Cup, an annual international team indoor hardcourt tennis tournament.
- Water polo: The UWA Torpedoes water polo club competes in the National Water Polo League.
- Formula 1: The Formula 1 driver Daniel Ricciardo is from Perth.

International sporting events hosted in the past in Western Australia include the Tom Hoad Cup (water polo), the Perth International (golf), the 2006 Gravity Games (extreme sports), the 2002 Women's Hockey World Cup, the 1991 FINA World Aquatics Championships, the World Rally Championships and the 1962 British Empire and Commonwealth Games.

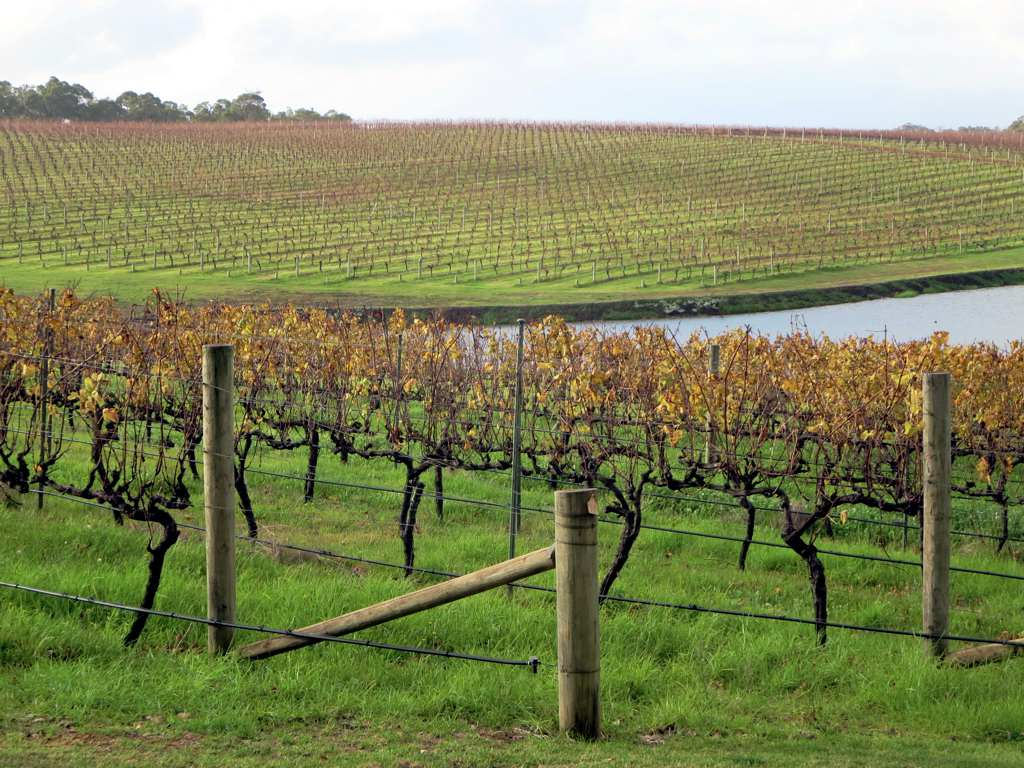
The Margaret River region is known for its wine production.

Western Australia's largest sports stadium is Perth Stadium, also known through naming rights sponsorship as Optus Stadium. It has a capacity of over 60,000 people and is primarily used for Australian rules football and cricket.

=== Wine ===
Winemaking regions are concentrated in the cooler climate of the south-western portion of the state. Western Australia produces less than 5% of the country's wine output, but in quality terms is considered to be very much near the top. Major wine producing regions include: Margaret River, The Great Southern, Swan Valley as well as smaller districts including Blackwood Valley, Manjimup, Pemberton, Peel, Chittering Valley, Perth Hills, and Geographe.

== Public holidays ==
The table below outlines all recognised public holidays in Western Australia.

Public holidays in Western Australia
Name	Date
New Year's Day*	1 January
Australia Day*	26 January
Labour Day	First Monday in March
Good Friday	Variable (aligns with Easter) (March or April)
Easter Sunday	Variable (aligns with Easter) (March or April)
Easter Monday	Variable (aligns with Easter) (March or April)
Anzac Day*	25 April
Western Australia Day	First Monday in June
King's Birthday	As proclaimed by the governor of Western Australia (September/October)
Christmas Day*	25 December
Boxing Day*	26 December

*Indicates a nationwide holiday

== Sister states ==
Western Australia has five sister states:

- East Java, Indonesia
- Hyōgo Prefecture, Japan
- Andhra Pradesh State, India
- Tuscany Region, Italy
- Zhejiang Province, China

In 1981, a sister state agreement was drawn up between Western Australia and Hyōgo Prefecture in Japan that was aimed at improving cultural ties between the two states. To commemorate the 10th anniversary of this agreement, the Hyōgo Prefectural Government Cultural Centre was established in Perth in 1992. Prior to that, the Western Australian government opened an office in Kobe, the largest city in Hyōgo, to facilitate maintenance of the relationship in 1989.

Following the Great Hanshin earthquake that devastated southern Hyōgo in January 1995, Western Australian groups and businesses raised funds and provided materials, whilst individuals travelled to Hyōgo to help with emergency relief and the subsequent reconstruction process. The two governments signed a memorandum of understanding on the 20th anniversary in 2001 that aimed to improve the economic relationship between the two states.

Further to the sister state relationship, the City of Rockingham in Western Australia and the City of Akō in Hyōgo signed a sister city agreement in 1997. It is one of nine sister city relationships between Western Australian and Japanese cities.

== See also ==
- Outline of Australia
- Government of Western Australia
- Mining in Western Australia
- Petroleum in Western Australia

=== Lists ===
- List of Western Australian towns
- List of statues in Western Australia
- Local Government Areas of Western Australia
- Category:Lists of people from Western Australia
