= Electoral results for the Division of Forrest =

Australian division election results

This is a list of electoral results for the Division of Forrest in Australian federal elections from the division's creation in 1922 until the present.

== Members ==
| Member | Party | Term |
|---|---|---|
| John Prowse | Country | 1922–1943 |
| Nelson Lemmon | Labor | 1943–1949 |
| Gordon Freeth | Liberal | 1949–1969 |
| Frank Kirwan | Labor | 1969–1972 |
| Peter Drummond | Liberal | 1972–1987 |
| Geoff Prosser | Liberal | 1987–2007 |
| Nola Marino | Liberal | 2007–present |

== Election results ==
=== Elections in the 2020s ===
==== 2025 ====
2025 Australian federal election: Forrest
| Party | Candidate | Votes | % | ±% |
|---|---|---|---|---|
| Labor | Tabitha Dowding | | | |
| Independent | Sue Chapman | | | |
| Greens | Georgia Beardman | | | |
| One Nation | Paul van der Mey | | | |
| Trumpet of Patriots | Peter Greenland | | | |
| National | Cam Parsons | | | |
| Legalise Cannabis | Aaron Peet | | | |
| Liberal | Ben Small | | | |
| Total formal votes | | | | |
| Informal votes | | | | |
| Turnout | | | | |

==== 2022 ====
2022 Australian federal election: Forrest
| Party | Candidate | Votes | % | ±% |
|---|---|---|---|---|
| Liberal | Nola Marino | 41,006 | 43.12 | −9.36 |
| Labor | Bronwen English | 26,092 | 27.44 | +6.29 |
| Greens | Christine Terrantroy | 12,780 | 13.44 | +0.60 |
| One Nation | Shane Mezger | 5,020 | 5.28 | −0.67 |
| Great Australian | Tracy Aitken | 2,907 | 3.06 | +3.06 |
| United Australia | Helen Allan | 2,426 | 2.55 | +0.82 |
| Western Australia | Greg Stephens | 2,130 | 2.24 | +0.95 |
| Liberal Democrats | Paul Markham | 1,577 | 1.66 | +1.66 |
| Federation | Mailee Dunn | 1,152 | 1.21 | +1.21 |
| Total formal votes | | 95,090 | 94.78 | +0.42 |
| Informal votes | | 5,234 | 5.22 | −0.42 |
| Turnout | | 100,324 | 88.78 | −2.36 |
Two-party-preferred result
| Liberal | Nola Marino | 51,625 | 54.29 | −10.29 |
| Labor | Bronwen English | 43,465 | 45.71 | +10.29 |
| Liberal hold | | Swing | −10.29 | |

Alluvial diagram for preference flows in the seat of Forrest in the 2022 federal election. indicates at what stage the winning candidate had over 50% of the votes and was declared the winner.

=== Elections in the 2010s ===
==== 2019 ====
2019 Australian federal election: Forrest
| Party | Candidate | Votes | % | ±% |
|---|---|---|---|---|
| Liberal | Nola Marino | 47,470 | 52.48 | +3.04 |
| Labor | Wayne Sanford | 19,126 | 21.14 | −2.00 |
| Greens | Nerilee Boshammer | 11,645 | 12.87 | +0.90 |
| One Nation | Kalven Jamieson | 5,371 | 5.94 | +5.94 |
| Shooters, Fishers, Farmers | Mark McCall | 2,881 | 3.18 | +3.18 |
| United Australia | Dale Bromley | 1,564 | 1.73 | +1.73 |
| Independent | Alexander Marsden | 1,238 | 1.37 | +1.37 |
| Western Australia | Ian Molyneux | 1,167 | 1.29 | +1.29 |
| Total formal votes | | 90,462 | 94.35 | +0.21 |
| Informal votes | | 5,418 | 5.65 | −0.21 |
| Turnout | | 95,880 | 90.95 | +1.23 |
Two-party-preferred result
| Liberal | Nola Marino | 58,405 | 64.56 | +2.00 |
| Labor | Wayne Sanford | 32,057 | 35.44 | −2.00 |
| Liberal hold | | Swing | +2.00 | |

==== 2016 ====
2016 Australian federal election: Forrest
| Party | Candidate | Votes | % | ±% |
|---|---|---|---|---|
| Liberal | Nola Marino | 41,869 | 49.44 | −1.81 |
| Labor | Lorrae Loud | 19,596 | 23.14 | −0.39 |
| Greens | Jill Reading | 10,137 | 11.97 | +2.13 |
| National | Luke Pilkington | 4,306 | 5.08 | −1.31 |
| Independent | Ross Slater | 2,896 | 3.42 | +3.42 |
| Outdoor Recreation | David Fishlock | 2,375 | 2.80 | +2.80 |
| Christians | Edward Dabrowski | 1,858 | 2.19 | +0.56 |
| Rise Up Australia | Jennifer Whately | 1,654 | 1.95 | +1.27 |
| Total formal votes | | 84,691 | 94.14 | −0.27 |
| Informal votes | | 5,269 | 5.86 | +0.27 |
| Turnout | | 89,960 | 89.72 | −0.43 |
Two-party-preferred result
| Liberal | Nola Marino | 52,981 | 62.56 | −1.25 |
| Labor | Lorrae Loud | 31,710 | 37.44 | +1.25 |
| Liberal hold | | Swing | −1.25 | |

==== 2013 ====
2013 Australian federal election: Forrest
| Party | Candidate | Votes | % | ±% |
|---|---|---|---|---|
| Liberal | Nola Marino | 42,640 | 49.92 | +0.96 |
| Labor | John Borlini | 21,579 | 25.26 | −2.93 |
| Greens | Gordon Tayler | 8,136 | 9.52 | −3.96 |
| National | Michael Rose | 5,338 | 6.25 | +0.27 |
| Palmer United | Edward Dabrowski | 4,301 | 5.03 | +5.03 |
| Christians | Wayne Barnett | 1,374 | 1.61 | +1.61 |
| Family First | Bev Custers | 1,270 | 1.49 | −0.46 |
| Rise Up Australia | Mark Morien | 581 | 0.68 | +0.68 |
| Citizens Electoral Council | Ian Tuffnell | 204 | 0.24 | +0.24 |
| Total formal votes | | 85,423 | 94.37 | −1.08 |
| Informal votes | | 5,095 | 5.63 | +1.08 |
| Turnout | | 90,518 | 93.41 | −0.78 |
Two-party-preferred result
| Liberal | Nola Marino | 53,198 | 62.28 | +3.54 |
| Labor | John Borlini | 32,225 | 37.72 | −3.54 |
| Liberal hold | | Swing | +3.54 | |

==== 2010 ====
2010 Australian federal election: Forrest
| Party | Candidate | Votes | % | ±% |
|---|---|---|---|---|
| Liberal | Nola Marino | 39,460 | 48.96 | +3.81 |
| Labor | Jackie Jarvis | 22,724 | 28.19 | −2.43 |
| Greens | Luke Petersen | 10,863 | 13.48 | +5.07 |
| National | John Hill | 4,822 | 5.98 | +5.98 |
| Family First | Bev Custers | 1,573 | 1.95 | +0.57 |
| Christian Democrats | Lee Herridge | 1,158 | 1.44 | −0.45 |
| Total formal votes | | 80,600 | 95.45 | −1.27 |
| Informal votes | | 3,844 | 4.55 | +1.27 |
| Turnout | | 84,444 | 94.21 | −0.29 |
Two-party-preferred result
| Liberal | Nola Marino | 47,343 | 58.74 | +3.26 |
| Labor | Jackie Jarvis | 33,257 | 41.26 | −3.26 |
| Liberal hold | | Swing | +3.26 | |

=== Elections in the 2000s ===
==== 2007 ====
2007 Australian federal election: Forrest
| Party | Candidate | Votes | % | ±% |
|---|---|---|---|---|
| Liberal | Nola Marino | 38,928 | 45.40 | −8.02 |
| Labor | Peter Macfarlane | 25,883 | 30.18 | +2.25 |
| Independent | Noel Brunning | 9,924 | 11.57 | +11.57 |
| Greens | Kingsley Gibson | 7,150 | 8.34 | −0.11 |
| Christian Democrats | John Lewis | 1,643 | 1.92 | +0.32 |
| Family First | Leighton Knoll | 1,150 | 1.34 | −0.31 |
| One Nation | Jodie Yardley | 928 | 1.08 | −2.36 |
| Citizens Electoral Council | Ian Tuffnell | 144 | 0.17 | −0.26 |
| Total formal votes | | 85,750 | 96.67 | +2.17 |
| Informal votes | | 2,954 | 3.33 | = −2.17 |
| Turnout | | 88,704 | 94.69 | +0.54 |
Two-party-preferred result
| Liberal | Nola Marino | 47,871 | 55.83 | −4.62 |
| Labor | Peter Macfarlane | 37,879 | 44.17 | +4.62 |
| Liberal hold | | Swing | −4.62 | |

==== 2004 ====
2004 Australian federal election: Forrest
| Party | Candidate | Votes | % | ±% |
|---|---|---|---|---|
| Liberal | Geoff Prosser | 41,422 | 53.42 | +7.39 |
| Labor | Tresslyn Smith | 21,655 | 27.93 | −2.68 |
| Greens | Kingsley Gibson | 6,549 | 8.45 | +1.28 |
| One Nation | Alan Giorgi | 2,667 | 3.44 | −6.61 |
| Democrats | Adam Welch | 1,311 | 1.69 | −1.63 |
| Family First | Linda Rose | 1,281 | 1.65 | +1.65 |
| Christian Democrats | Shane Flanegan | 1,242 | 1.60 | +1.60 |
| New Country | Ken Vagg | 1,075 | 1.39 | +1.39 |
| Citizens Electoral Council | Ian Tuffnell | 334 | 0.43 | +0.05 |
| Total formal votes | | 77,536 | 94.50 | −0.45 |
| Informal votes | | 4,512 | 5.50 | +0.45 |
| Turnout | | 82,048 | 94.15 | −1.53 |
Two-party-preferred result
| Liberal | Geoff Prosser | 46,871 | 60.45 | +2.84 |
| Labor | Tresslyn Smith | 30,665 | 39.55 | −2.84 |
| Liberal hold | | Swing | +2.84 | |

==== 2001 ====
2001 Australian federal election: Forrest
| Party | Candidate | Votes | % | ±% |
|---|---|---|---|---|
| Liberal | Geoff Prosser | 34,392 | 46.03 | +3.79 |
| Labor | Tresslyn Smith | 22,872 | 30.61 | −0.10 |
| One Nation | Alan Giorgi | 7,510 | 10.05 | −1.88 |
| Greens | Paul Llewellyn | 5,359 | 7.17 | +1.07 |
| Democrats | Alison Wylie | 2,477 | 3.31 | +0.27 |
| National | Charles Caldwell | 1,397 | 1.87 | −1.09 |
| Curtin Labor Alliance | Megan Kirwan | 433 | 0.58 | +0.58 |
| Citizens Electoral Council | Arthur Harvey | 281 | 0.38 | +0.25 |
| Total formal votes | | 74,721 | 94.95 | +0.08 |
| Informal votes | | 3,976 | 5.05 | −0.08 |
| Turnout | | 78,697 | 96.36 | |
Two-party-preferred result
| Liberal | Geoff Prosser | 43,049 | 57.61 | +3.01 |
| Labor | Tresslyn Smith | 31,672 | 42.39 | −3.01 |
| Liberal hold | | Swing | +3.01 | |

=== Elections in the 1990s ===
==== 1998 ====
1998 Australian federal election: Forrest
| Party | Candidate | Votes | % | ±% |
|---|---|---|---|---|
| Liberal | Geoff Prosser | 32,171 | 42.78 | −14.34 |
| Labor | Tony Dean | 20,332 | 27.04 | −1.67 |
| One Nation | Paddy Embry | 10,029 | 13.34 | +13.34 |
| Greens | Paul Llewellyn | 5,303 | 7.05 | −0.42 |
| National | Steve Thomas | 2,354 | 3.13 | +3.13 |
| Democrats | Alf Denman | 2,253 | 3.00 | −2.13 |
| Christian Democrats | Jim Cummins | 1,316 | 1.75 | +1.75 |
| Australia First | Ted Stone | 897 | 1.19 | +1.19 |
| | Jon Doust | 424 | 0.56 | +0.56 |
| Citizens Electoral Council | John Watson | 117 | 0.16 | +0.16 |
| Total formal votes | | 75,196 | 94.90 | −2.43 |
| Informal votes | | 4,037 | 5.10 | +2.43 |
| Turnout | | 79,233 | 95.85 | −0.04 |
Two-party-preferred result
| Liberal | Geoff Prosser | 42,775 | 56.88 | −7.21 |
| Labor | Tony Dean | 32,421 | 43.12 | +7.21 |
| Liberal hold | | Swing | −7.21 | |

==== 1996 ====
1996 Australian federal election: Forrest
| Party | Candidate | Votes | % | ±% |
|---|---|---|---|---|
| Liberal | Geoff Prosser | 43,067 | 56.99 | +0.92 |
| Labor | Ann Mills | 21,920 | 29.01 | −1.71 |
| Greens | Basil Schur | 5,537 | 7.33 | −0.88 |
| Democrats | Ronald Hellyer | 3,864 | 5.11 | +0.11 |
| Independent | Alexander Marsden | 1,181 | 1.56 | +1.56 |
| Total formal votes | | 75,569 | 97.35 | −0.25 |
| Informal votes | | 2,060 | 2.65 | +0.25 |
| Turnout | | 77,629 | 95.88 | −0.94 |
Two-party-preferred result
| Liberal | Geoff Prosser | 47,821 | 63.64 | +1.91 |
| Labor | Ann Mills | 27,320 | 36.36 | −1.91 |
| Liberal hold | | Swing | +1.91 | |

==== 1993 ====
1993 Australian federal election: Forrest
| Party | Candidate | Votes | % | ±% |
|---|---|---|---|---|
| Liberal | Geoff Prosser | 40,099 | 56.07 | +7.74 |
| Labor | Peter Procter | 21,964 | 30.71 | +1.48 |
| Greens | Jill Reading | 5,869 | 8.21 | −0.53 |
| Democrats | David Churches | 3,581 | 5.01 | −2.23 |
| Total formal votes | | 71,513 | 97.60 | +0.65 |
| Informal votes | | 1,760 | 2.40 | −0.65 |
| Turnout | | 73,273 | 96.82 | |
Two-party-preferred result
| Liberal | Geoff Prosser | 44,124 | 61.73 | +1.82 |
| Labor | Peter Procter | 27,350 | 38.27 | −1.82 |
| Liberal hold | | Swing | +1.82 | |

==== 1990 ====
1990 Australian federal election: Forrest
| Party | Candidate | Votes | % | ±% |
|---|---|---|---|---|
| Liberal | Geoff Prosser | 31,770 | 48.3 | +1.8 |
| Labor | Simon Keely | 19,219 | 29.2 | −10.5 |
| Greens | Giz Watson | 5,742 | 8.7 | +8.7 |
| Democrats | David Churches | 4,760 | 7.2 | +1.6 |
| National | Rick Beatty | 4,245 | 6.5 | −1.7 |
| Total formal votes | | 65,736 | 96.9 | |
| Informal votes | | 2,069 | 3.1 | |
| Turnout | | 67,805 | 95.7 | |
Two-party-preferred result
| Liberal | Geoff Prosser | 39,328 | 59.9 | +4.3 |
| Labor | Simon Keely | 26,315 | 40.1 | −4.3 |
| Liberal hold | | Swing | +4.3 | |

=== Elections in the 1980s ===
==== 1987 ====
1987 Australian federal election: Forrest
| Party | Candidate | Votes | % | ±% |
|---|---|---|---|---|
| Liberal | Geoff Prosser | 27,925 | 44.0 | −6.4 |
| Labor | Gerry Thompson | 26,764 | 42.2 | −3.5 |
| National | Joe Chambers | 5,175 | 8.2 | +8.2 |
| Democrats | David Churches | 3,553 | 5.6 | +2.7 |
| Total formal votes | | 63,417 | 94.4 | |
| Informal votes | | 3,747 | 5.6 | |
| Turnout | | 67,164 | 95.3 | |
Two-party-preferred result
| Liberal | Geoff Prosser | 33,678 | 53.1 | +0.7 |
| Labor | Gerry Thompson | 29,737 | 46.9 | −0.7 |
| Liberal hold | | Swing | +0.7 | |

==== 1984 ====
1984 Australian federal election: Forrest
| Party | Candidate | Votes | % | ±% |
|---|---|---|---|---|
| Liberal | Peter Drummond | 30,009 | 50.4 | +1.9 |
| Labor | Peter Holland | 27,177 | 45.7 | +0.1 |
| Democrats | Anne Fussell | 1,701 | 2.9 | −0.8 |
| Independent | Alfred Bussell | 646 | 1.1 | −1.2 |
| Total formal votes | | 59,533 | 93.8 | |
| Informal votes | | 3,942 | 6.2 | |
| Turnout | | 63,475 | 95.4 | |
Two-party-preferred result
| Liberal | Peter Drummond | 31,202 | 52.4 | +1.4 |
| Labor | Peter Holland | 28,327 | 47.6 | −1.4 |
| Liberal hold | | Swing | +1.4 | |

==== 1983 ====
1983 Australian federal election: Forrest
| Party | Candidate | Votes | % | ±% |
|---|---|---|---|---|
| Liberal | Peter Drummond | 32,076 | 48.9 | −2.4 |
| Labor | David Churches | 29,643 | 45.2 | +9.2 |
| Democrats | Donald Stewart | 2,416 | 3.7 | −3.3 |
| Independent | Alfred Bussell | 1,485 | 2.3 | +2.3 |
| Total formal votes | | 65,620 | 98.1 | |
| Informal votes | | 1,281 | 1.9 | |
| Turnout | | 66,901 | 94.7 | |
Two-party-preferred result
| Liberal | Peter Drummond | 33,735 | 51.4 | −8.4 |
| Labor | David Churches | 31,885 | 48.6 | +8.4 |
| Liberal hold | | Swing | −8.4 | |

==== 1980 ====
1980 Australian federal election: Forrest
| Party | Candidate | Votes | % | ±% |
|---|---|---|---|---|
| Liberal | Peter Drummond | 31,005 | 51.3 | +4.4 |
| Labor | Walter MacMillan | 21,749 | 36.0 | +6.7 |
| Democrats | Alfred Bussell | 4,206 | 7.0 | +0.0 |
| National Country | Francis Timms | 3,468 | 5.7 | −7.2 |
| Total formal votes | | 60,428 | 97.3 | |
| Informal votes | | 1,663 | 2.7 | |
| Turnout | | 62,091 | 94.0 | |
Two-party-preferred result
| Liberal | Peter Drummond | | 59.8 | −4.4 |
| Labor | Walter MacMillan | | 40.2 | +4.4 |
| Liberal hold | | Swing | −4.4 | |

=== Elections in the 1970s ===
==== 1977 ====
1977 Australian federal election: Forrest
| Party | Candidate | Votes | % | ±% |
|---|---|---|---|---|
| Liberal | Peter Drummond | 30,723 | 48.4 | −8.1 |
| Labor | Allan Drake-Brockman | 17,640 | 27.8 | −5.0 |
| National Country | John Gardiner | 8,183 | 12.9 | +3.6 |
| Democrats | Donald Stewart | 4,466 | 7.0 | +7.0 |
| Progress | Reginald Crabb | 2,495 | 3.9 | +3.9 |
| Total formal votes | | 63,507 | 96.8 | |
| Informal votes | | 2,114 | 3.2 | |
| Turnout | | 65,621 | 96.2 | |
Two-party-preferred result
| Liberal | Peter Drummond | | 65.7 | +0.1 |
| Labor | Allan Drake-Brockman | | 34.3 | −0.1 |
| Liberal hold | | Swing | +0.1 | |

==== 1975 ====
1975 Australian federal election: Forrest
| Party | Candidate | Votes | % | ±% |
|---|---|---|---|---|
| Liberal | Peter Drummond | 30,158 | 54.7 | +8.0 |
| Labor | Geoffrey Davy | 19,075 | 34.6 | −2.6 |
| National Country | Noel Klopper | 5,134 | 9.3 | −5.7 |
| Independent | Noel Duggan | 484 | 0.9 | +0.9 |
| Independent | Duncan Hordacre | 290 | 0.5 | +0.5 |
| Total formal votes | | 55,141 | 97.8 | |
| Informal votes | | 1,217 | 2.2 | |
| Turnout | | 56,358 | 96.7 | |
Two-party-preferred result
| Liberal | Peter Drummond | | 63.8 | +2.4 |
| Labor | Geoffrey Davy | | 36.2 | −2.4 |
| Liberal hold | | Swing | +2.4 | |

==== 1974 ====
1974 Australian federal election: Forrest
| Party | Candidate | Votes | % | ±% |
|---|---|---|---|---|
| Liberal | Peter Drummond | 24,860 | 46.7 | +14.7 |
| Labor | Albert Newman | 19,801 | 37.2 | −6.4 |
| National Alliance | Terence Best | 7,967 | 15.0 | −8.4 |
| Australia | Lawrence Gibson | 569 | 1.1 | +0.1 |
| Total formal votes | | 53,197 | 98.0 | |
| Informal votes | | 1,084 | 2.0 | |
| Turnout | | 54,281 | 96.4 | |
Two-party-preferred result
| Liberal | Peter Drummond | 32,689 | 61.4 | +7.8 |
| Labor | Albert Newman | 20,508 | 38.6 | −7.8 |
| Liberal hold | | Swing | +7.8 | |

==== 1972 ====
1972 Australian federal election: Forrest
| Party | Candidate | Votes | % | ±% |
|---|---|---|---|---|
| Labor | Frank Kirwan | 20,843 | 43.6 | −4.0 |
| Liberal | Peter Drummond | 15,304 | 32.0 | −10.9 |
| Country | David Reid | 9,723 | 20.3 | +20.3 |
| Democratic Labor | John Fleeton | 1,483 | 3.1 | −4.1 |
| Australia | Russell Moffet | 455 | 1.0 | −1.4 |
| Total formal votes | | 47,808 | 97.7 | |
| Informal votes | | 1,143 | 2.3 | |
| Turnout | | 48,951 | 95.9 | |
Two-party-preferred result
| Liberal | Peter Drummond | 25,615 | 53.6 | +4.7 |
| Labor | Frank Kirwan | 22,193 | 46.4 | −4.7 |
| Liberal gain from Labor | | Swing | +4.7 | |

=== Elections in the 1960s ===
==== 1969 ====
1969 Australian federal election: Forrest
| Party | Candidate | Votes | % | ±% |
|---|---|---|---|---|
| Labor | Frank Kirwan | 22,149 | 47.6 | +9.9 |
| Liberal | Gordon Freeth | 19,955 | 42.9 | −9.2 |
| Democratic Labor | Henry Sullivan | 3,332 | 7.2 | −3.0 |
| Australia | Anthony Montgomery | 1,106 | 2.4 | +2.4 |
| Total formal votes | | 46,542 | 97.6 | |
| Informal votes | | 1,132 | 2.4 | |
| Turnout | | 47,674 | 96.2 | |
Two-party-preferred result
| Labor | Frank Kirwan | 23,798 | 51.1 | +11.6 |
| Liberal | Gordon Freeth | 22,744 | 48.9 | −11.6 |
| Labor gain from Liberal | | Swing | +11.6 | |

==== 1966 ====
1966 Australian federal election: Forrest
| Party | Candidate | Votes | % | ±% |
|---|---|---|---|---|
| Liberal | Gordon Freeth | 20,834 | 51.1 | −1.0 |
| Labor | Frank Kirwan | 15,796 | 38.7 | −0.9 |
| Democratic Labor | Maurice Bailey | 4,163 | 10.2 | +10.2 |
| Total formal votes | | 40,793 | 96.4 | |
| Informal votes | | 1,524 | 3.6 | |
| Turnout | | 42,317 | 96.2 | |
Two-party-preferred result
| Liberal | Gordon Freeth | | 59.5 | +3.3 |
| Labor | Frank Kirwan | | 40.5 | −3.3 |
| Liberal hold | | Swing | +3.3 | |

==== 1963 ====
1963 Australian federal election: Forrest
| Party | Candidate | Votes | % | ±% |
|---|---|---|---|---|
| Liberal | Gordon Freeth | 20,921 | 52.1 | −5.4 |
| Labor | Robert Smithson | 15,899 | 39.6 | −2.9 |
| Independent Country | Frank Oates | 3,304 | 8.2 | +8.2 |
| Total formal votes | | 40,124 | 98.6 | |
| Informal votes | | 583 | 1.4 | |
| Turnout | | 40,707 | 96.6 | |
Two-party-preferred result
| Liberal | Gordon Freeth | | 56.2 | −1.3 |
| Labor | Robert Smithson | | 43.8 | +1.3 |
| Liberal hold | | Swing | −1.3 | |

==== 1961 ====
1961 Australian federal election: Forrest
| Party | Candidate | Votes | % | ±% |
|---|---|---|---|---|
| Liberal | Gordon Freeth | 22,275 | 57.5 | +5.9 |
| Labor | Ernest Stapleton | 16,462 | 42.5 | +3.7 |
| Total formal votes | | 38,737 | 97.1 | |
| Informal votes | | 1,148 | 2.9 | |
| Turnout | | 39,885 | 96.0 | |
| Liberal hold | | Swing | −2.0 | |

=== Elections in the 1950s ===
==== 1958 ====
1958 Australian federal election: Forrest
| Party | Candidate | Votes | % | ±% |
|---|---|---|---|---|
| Liberal | Gordon Freeth | 19,273 | 51.6 | −48.4 |
| Labor | Ernest Stapleton | 14,480 | 38.8 | +38.8 |
| Democratic Labor | Arthur Addis | 3,600 | 9.6 | +9.6 |
| Total formal votes | | 37,353 | 96.6 | |
| Informal votes | | 1,317 | 3.4 | |
| Turnout | | 38,670 | 97.0 | |
Two-party-preferred result
| Liberal | Gordon Freeth | | 59.5 | −40.5 |
| Labor | Ernest Stapleton | | 40.5 | +40.5 |
| Liberal hold | | Swing | −40.5 | |

==== 1955 ====
1955 Australian federal election: Forrest
| Party | Candidate | Votes | % | ±% |
|---|---|---|---|---|
| Liberal | Gordon Freeth | unopposed | | |
| Liberal hold | | Swing | | |

==== 1954 ====
1954 Australian federal election: Forrest
| Party | Candidate | Votes | % | ±% |
|---|---|---|---|---|
| Liberal | Gordon Freeth | 23,643 | 57.7 | −1.8 |
| Labor | Frederick O'Connor | 17,331 | 42.3 | +1.8 |
| Total formal votes | | 40,974 | 98.4 | |
| Informal votes | | 683 | 1.6 | |
| Turnout | | 41,657 | 97.3 | |
| Liberal hold | | Swing | −1.8 | |

==== 1951 ====
1951 Australian federal election: Forrest
| Party | Candidate | Votes | % | ±% |
|---|---|---|---|---|
| Liberal | Gordon Freeth | 22,287 | 59.5 | +32.5 |
| Labor | Frederick O'Connor | 15,171 | 40.5 | −3.3 |
| Total formal votes | | 37,458 | 97.7 | |
| Informal votes | | 868 | 2.3 | |
| Turnout | | 38,326 | 97.0 | |
| Liberal hold | | Swing | +6.7 | |

=== Elections in the 1940s ===
==== 1949 ====
1949 Australian federal election: Forrest
| Party | Candidate | Votes | % | ±% |
|---|---|---|---|---|
| Labor | Nelson Lemmon | 15,935 | 43.8 | −7.8 |
| Country | Arnold Potts | 10,003 | 27.5 | +6.3 |
| Liberal | Gordon Freeth | 9,828 | 27.0 | −0.2 |
| Independent | James Bolitho | 642 | 1.8 | +1.8 |
| Total formal votes | | 36,408 | 98.0 | |
| Informal votes | | 749 | 2.0 | |
| Turnout | | 37,157 | 97.5 | |
Two-party-preferred result
| Liberal | Gordon Freeth | 19,217 | 52.8 | +4.4 |
| Labor | Nelson Lemmon | 17,191 | 47.2 | −4.4 |
| Liberal gain from Labor | | Swing | +4.4 | |

==== 1946 ====
1946 Australian federal election: Forrest
| Party | Candidate | Votes | % | ±% |
|---|---|---|---|---|
| Labor | Nelson Lemmon | 23,944 | 50.1 | −2.8 |
| Liberal | James Cumming | 13,349 | 28.0 | +28.0 |
| Country | Jasper Norton | 10,466 | 21.9 | −12.4 |
| Total formal votes | | 47,759 | 97.8 | |
| Informal votes | | 1,064 | 2.2 | |
| Turnout | | 48,823 | 94.5 | |
Two-party-preferred result
| Labor | Nelson Lemmon | | 52.3 | −6.1 |
| Liberal | James Cumming | | 47.7 | +47.7 |
| Labor hold | | Swing | −6.1 | |

==== 1943 ====
1943 Australian federal election: Forrest
| Party | Candidate | Votes | % | ±% |
|---|---|---|---|---|
| Labor | Nelson Lemmon | 23,931 | 52.9 | +8.3 |
| Country | John Prowse | 15,507 | 34.3 | −21.1 |
| Independent | Ian Fergusson-Stewart | 3,264 | 7.2 | +7.2 |
| Independent Country | Arthur West | 2,156 | 4.8 | +4.8 |
| Independent | Wildred Lewis | 377 | 0.8 | +0.8 |
| Total formal votes | | 45,235 | 97.1 | |
| Informal votes | | 1,343 | 2.9 | |
| Turnout | | 46,578 | 97.5 | |
Two-party-preferred result
| Labor | Nelson Lemmon | | 58.4 | +13.8 |
| Country | John Prowse | | 42.6 | −13.8 |
| Labor gain from Country | | Swing | +13.8 | |

==== 1940 ====
1940 Australian federal election: Forrest
| Party | Candidate | Votes | % | ±% |
|---|---|---|---|---|
| Country | John Prowse | 24,619 | 55.4 | +1.0 |
| Labor | Vane Green | 19,832 | 44.6 | −1.0 |
| Total formal votes | | 44,451 | 97.7 | |
| Informal votes | | 1,053 | 2.3 | |
| Turnout | | 45,504 | 94.1 | |
| Country hold | | Swing | +1.0 | |

=== Elections in the 1930s ===
==== 1937 ====
1937 Australian federal election: Forrest
| Party | Candidate | Votes | % | ±% |
|---|---|---|---|---|
| Country | John Prowse | 22,894 | 54.4 | −5.7 |
| Labor | Ernest Hoar | 19,153 | 45.6 | +17.0 |
| Total formal votes | | 42,047 | 96.7 | |
| Informal votes | | 1,430 | 3.3 | |
| Turnout | | 43,477 | 94.2 | |
| Country hold | | Swing | −9.4 | |

==== 1934 ====
1934 Australian federal election: Forrest
| Party | Candidate | Votes | % | ±% |
|---|---|---|---|---|
| Country | John Prowse | 18,996 | 47.2 | −52.8 |
| Labor | Edwin Davies | 11,660 | 29.0 | +29.0 |
| Country | Cecil Elsegood | 4,826 | 12.0 | +12.0 |
| Social Credit | Harry Squance | 4,734 | 11.8 | +11.8 |
| Total formal votes | | 40,216 | 96.8 | |
| Informal votes | | 1,593 | 3.8 | |
| Turnout | | 41,809 | 92.0 | |
Two-party-preferred result
| Country | John Prowse | | 63.8 | −36.2 |
| Labor | Edwin Davies | | 36.2 | +36.2 |
| Country hold | | Swing | −36.2 | |

==== 1931 ====
1931 Australian federal election: Forrest
| Party | Candidate | Votes | % | ±% |
|---|---|---|---|---|
| Country | John Prowse | unopposed | | |
| Country hold | | Swing | | |

=== Elections in the 1920s ===
==== 1929 ====
1929 Australian federal election: Forrest
| Party | Candidate | Votes | % | ±% |
|---|---|---|---|---|
| Country | John Prowse | unopposed | | |
| Country hold | | Swing | | |

==== 1928 ====
1928 Australian federal election: Forrest
| Party | Candidate | Votes | % | ±% |
|---|---|---|---|---|
| Country | John Prowse | 21,463 | 60.4 | −0.5 |
| Labor | Cornelius Buckley | 14,049 | 39.6 | +0.5 |
| Total formal votes | | 35,512 | 96.4 | |
| Informal votes | | 1,309 | 3.6 | |
| Turnout | | 36,821 | 90.3 | |
| Country hold | | Swing | −0.5 | |

==== 1925 ====
1925 Australian federal election: Forrest
| Party | Candidate | Votes | % | ±% |
|---|---|---|---|---|
| Country | John Prowse | 21,760 | 60.9 | −18.6 |
| Labor | Thomas Lowry | 13,976 | 39.1 | +39.1 |
| Total formal votes | | 35,736 | 96.5 | |
| Informal votes | | 1,301 | 3.5 | |
| Turnout | | 37,037 | 89.9 | |
| Country hold | | Swing | −18.6 | |

==== 1922 ====
1922 Australian federal election: Forrest
| Party | Candidate | Votes | % | ±% |
|---|---|---|---|---|
| Country | John Prowse | 10,007 | 79.5 | +33.1 |
| Nationalist | Peter Wedd | 2,576 | 20.5 | +0.3 |
| Total formal votes | | 12,583 | 90.6 | |
| Informal votes | | 1,303 | 9.4 | |
| Turnout | | 13,886 | 40.9 | |
| Country notional hold | | Swing | +14.9 | |
