= Jon Doust =

Comedian, writer, novelist from Western Australia

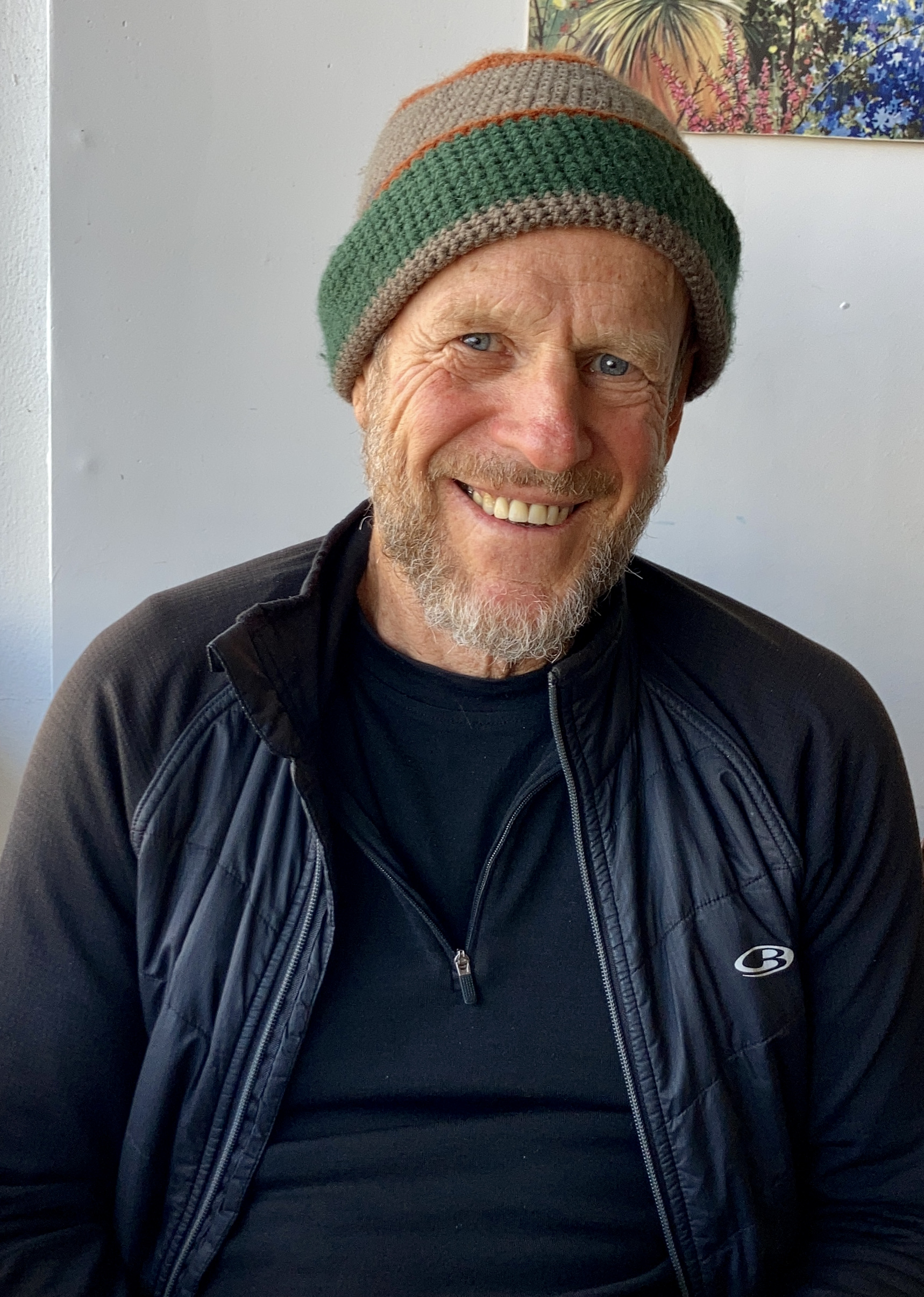
- Jon Doust in Albany Western Australia, May 2021
- Born: Bridgetown, Western Australia
- Education: Western Australian Institute of Technology (BA)
- Alma mater: Curtin University
- Occupations: Comedian, writer, novelist, speaker
- Writing career
- Years active: 1990s–present
- Genres: Fiction, humour, children's literature
- Notable works: Boy on a Wire (2009); To the Highlands (2012); Return Ticket (2020)

Jon Doust is a comedian, writer, novelist and professional speaker, born in 1948 in Bridgetown, Western Australia, who lives in Albany, Western Australia. He gained a BA majoring in English from the Western Australian Institute of Technology (now Curtin University) and worked in farming, retailing and journalism before pursuing a career in comedy and writing.

== Comedy ==
He has performed at a number of comedy venues and festivals, including the Amnesty International Comedy Festival in Sydney and the Palandri International Comedy Festival in Margaret River. He has supported local and international comedy acts including Alexei Sayle, Hale and Pace, Richard Stubbs, Rachel Berger and illusionist Robert Gallop.

He has been a regular voice on local ABC radio stations, including at one stage a regular inhabitant of the Sunday radio programmes of Peter Holland among others. He was a regular guest on ABC Radio's Ted Bull programme.

Doust was a guest lecturer at the Curtin University Business School's Centre for Entrepreneurship and for many years ran a University of Western Australia Extension Program course entitled How to Laugh Your Way out of a Paper bag, in collaboration with others including Steve Wells and Don Smith.

== Politics ==
In the 1993 Australian federal election, he unsuccessfully stood for the seat of Curtin against incumbent Allan Rocher gaining only 428 votes (0.59%). His campaign slogan was "Put me last!". In the 1998 Australian federal election he stood against sitting member Geoff Prosser in the seat of Forrest, this time gaining 424 votes (0.56%).

== Writing ==
Doust has co-authored with Ken Spillman two children's books, Magpie Mischief (2002) and Magwheel Madness (2005) - both published by Fremantle Arts Centre Press, as well as short stories published in anthologies and The West Australian newspaper. He has also self-published two small books titled How to lose an election and Letters to the police and other species.

Early in his career he was a writer for Perth's Sunday Times newspaper as a reviewer of computer technology. He was later a columnist on the weekend edition of The West Australian newspaper, with clearly autobiographical references in his work.

He was shortlisted for the Western Australian Writer's Fellowship at the 2020 Western Australian Premier's Book Awards.

=== Novels ===
Doust's novels are Boy on a Wire, To the Highlands and Return Ticket.

- Boy on a Wire is based on boarding school experiences in Perth, Western Australia.
- To the Highlands was based on experiences on a South Pacific island.
- Return Ticket has included experiences between Australia, South Africa and Kibbutz living in Israel.

== Works ==
- (1992) Letters to the police — and other species with George Gosh. Lesmurdie, W.A: Wordplay.
- (1993) Better than a poke in the eye: a few notes, tips and things to do to help you increase the laughage in your life Lesmurdie W.A.: Wordplay.
- (1993) How to — lose an election Lesmurdie, W.A: Wordplay.
- (2002) with Ken Spillman Magpie mischief (illustrations by Marion Duke). Fremantle, W.A. Fremantle Arts Centre Press. ISBN 1-86368-355-0
- (2005) with Ken Spillman Magwheel madness (illustrations by Marion Duke). Fremantle, W.A. Fremantle Arts Centre Press. ISBN 1-920731-76-8
- (2009) Boy on a Wire, Fremantle Press, ISBN 978-1-921361-45-6
- (2012) To the Highlands, Fremantle Press, ISBN 978-1-921888-77-9
- (2020) Return Ticket, Fremantle Press, ISBN 978-1-925816-39-6

== Anthologies ==
- (1997) Great Australian Bites, ed. Dave Warner, Fremantle Arts Centre Press.
- (1997) Fathers in Writing, ed. Ross Fitzgerald and Ken Spillman, Tuart House.
