= Ben Small (politician) =

Australian politician (born 1988)

Ben Small MP

Member of the Australian Parliament for Forrest
- Incumbent
- Assumed office 3 May 2025
- Preceded by: Nola Marino

Senator for Western Australia
- In office 18 May 2022 – 30 June 2022
- Preceded by: Himself
- Succeeded by: Fatima Payman
- In office 25 November 2020 – 15 April 2022
- Preceded by: Mathias Cormann
- Succeeded by: Himself

Personal details
- Born: Benjamin John Small; 11 June 1988 (age 38) Perth, Western Australia
- Citizenship: Australian; New Zealander (until 2022)
- Party: Liberal
- Education: University of Tasmania (BAppSci); University of Canberra (MBA)
- Occupation: Politician
- Website: bensmallmp.com.au

Benjamin John Small (born 11 June 1988) is an Australian politician. He was selected to serve as a Senator for Western Australia, representing the Liberal Party, to fill a casual vacancy following Mathias Cormann's resignation. His first term lasted from November 2020 until his April 2022 resignation, and he resumed his term in May after being nominated to replace himself. Small was unsuccessful in his re-election bid in the 2022 federal election and his term as senator concluded on 30 June 2022. He was elected as the member for Forrest at the 2025 federal election.

Small studied nautical science, marine operations, and business management. He worked in marine transport and logistics for several energy and resource companies, with his holdings in those criticised as a potential conflict of interest. Before becoming a senator, he was active in grassroots politics, and unsuccessfully attempted to enter parliament at the 2016 election. Ideologically, he was considered a member of the National Right faction of the parliamentary Liberal Party.

== Early life and career ==
Small was born on 11 June 1988 in Perth, but grew up in the Goldfields–Esperance region, and later in Bunbury. His father was a New Zealand-born mine manager living in Australia as a permanent resident and his mother was an Australian citizen. Small attended Adam Road Primary School and then Bunbury Cathedral Grammar School. In 2009, he graduated from the Australian Maritime College (based at the University of Tasmania) with an Advanced Diploma of Applied Science in Nautical Science, followed by a Bachelor of Applied Science in Maritime Operations in 2012. He later obtained a Master of Business Administration from the University of Canberra.

From 2005 until 2015, Small was a skipper, trainee officer, and committee member for Bunbury Sea Rescue. From 2009 to 2019, Small volunteered with St John Ambulance Australia: first as an ambulance driver and officer, and later as a development officer. As part of the latter role, he helped deliver training to local services in Timor L'este.

After graduating with his Bachelor of Applied Science, Small worked as a chief officer and operations manager for Farstad Shipping and then as a marine operations manager at Woodside Energy. He has also co-owned Small's Bar in Eaton (a suburb of Bunbury) since 2017.

In 2012, Small joined the Liberal Party. He served as the vice-president of the party's Bunbury branch from 2013 to 2015, and was president from 2015 to 2017. In 2016, Small challenged the incumbent member for Forrest, Nola Marino, for preselection to be the Liberal Party candidate for the seat at that year's federal election. Small was backed by former member for Forrest Geoff Prosser. However, Prime Minister Malcolm Turnbull opposed Small's challenge and wrote a letter of support for Marino. Small lost the preselection vote 51–16. He served as president of the party's Forrest division from 2017 until his Senate nomination.

== Politics ==
=== Senate ===
Mathias Cormann (then serving as finance minister) announced his retirement from politics in July 2020 to run for the office of Secretary-General of the OECD. Cormann resigned from the Senate on 6 November 2020, triggering a casual vacancy to be filled by a Western Australian Liberal candidate. Small was selected by the Liberal Party's Western Australian branch at a meeting the following day, beating former state minister Albert Jacob who was seen as too sympathetic to religious conservatives. He was formally appointed by the Parliament of Western Australia on 25 November 2020, sworn into the Senate on 30 November 2020, and made his first speech on 3 February 2021. Small's shares in several mining and energy companies were labelled a potential conflict of interest.

Small served on seven different Senate committees during his term: Job Security, Education and Employment (both Legislative and References), Human Rights, Public Works, Migration, and Road Safety.

In July 2021, Small was included as part of the City of Perth's Brand Perth initiative, in which he recommended prioritising pedestrian access in the city and emphasising the Swan River as a tourist attraction.

In November 2021 Small was one of several parliamentarians to question Australian Broadcasting Corporation executives during a Senate Estimates hearing. Small was critical of several decisions made by the public broadcaster's managing director, David Anderson.

In a statement released on 15 April 2022, Small revealed that while preparing documents for the upcoming federal election he discovered that he held Australian-New Zealand dual citizenship, and had resigned as a member of the Senate that day. Holding dual citizenship disqualified him from serving in the Senate under section 44(i) of the Australian Constitution. Small also said that he had written to the New Zealand High Commission earlier that month to renounce any New Zealand citizenship he may have held, and had received a response confirming he was a New Zealand citizen, and that his request for a renunciation of New Zealand citizenship rights had been approved on 14 April. The renunciation came just a week before nominations closed for the federal election, in which he ran in third position on the Liberal Party's Western Australian Senate ticket.

Small resumed his position in the Senate on 18 May 2022 after being nominated to fill the vacancy his resignation had created. He was not returned to the Senate at the federal election, losing the sixth and final seat to Labor candidate Fatima Payman. Small said he was "surprised" by the outcome, and stated that the party needed to consider how they had "drifted so far from the needs and wants and aspirations of West Australians." His term ended on 30 June 2022.

He was elected unopposed as chair of the WA Liberal Party's finance committee in August 2022.

=== House of Representatives ===
Marino announced that she would retire at the 2025 federal election, and Small was (initially) the only nominee to be the Liberal's candidate for Forrest, which remains a very safe seat. Small's preselection was contested after City of Bunbury Councillor Gabi Ghasseb won an appeal to have his late nomination accepted, but Small won the nomination and was endorsed by the party's State Council. He was successful elected.

=== Political positions ===
During preselection, Small was described by state Liberal members as a moderate candidate who appealed to several state factions. However, he has since been aligned with the conservative National Right faction of the federal Liberal Party (led by Peter Dutton during Small's Senate term), similar to his predecessor Cormann. He was also a member of the Regional and Rural grouping.

Since joining the Senate, Small has described himself as an advocate for small business and free enterprise. He supports the GST distribution reform and criticised demands from the eastern states to reconsider the deal. He supported the Morrison government's withdrawn religious discrimination bill, which was intended to protect the rights of people of faith but was criticised for allowing discrimination by religious institutions (particularly against LGBT people). He has advocated for nuclear energy as a means to reduce carbon emissions.

Small was one of several Morrison government backbenchers who opposed attempts to enforce gender quotas in state Liberal Party branches.

Parliament of Australia
Preceded by Mathias Cormann	Senator for Western Australia; 2020–2022	Succeeded by Himself
Preceded by Himself	Senator for Western Australia; 2022	Succeeded by Fatima Payman
Australian House of Representatives
Preceded by Nola Marino	Member for Forrest; 2025–present	Incumbent
