= Ken Spillman =

Australian writer and editor

- Born: 11 June 1959 (age 67); London, England, United Kingdom
- Education: Newman College, Perth, Griffith University, Murdoch University
- Writing career
- Pen name: Kenneth Gaunt
- Website: www.kenspillman.com

Ken Spillman (born 11 June 1959) is an Australian writer based in Perth, Western Australia, whose work has spanned diverse genres including poetry, sports writing and literary criticism. He is best known as a prolific author of books for children and young adults. His output also includes a large number of books relating to aspects of Australian social history.

== Early life ==
Born in London to Australian parents, Spillman spent his childhood in Sydney and Perth. He was active in amateur theatre during his teens and also performed in a school rock band. Encouraged to write by a teacher at Newman College, Perth, he began publishing poetry and stories after moving to Brisbane to attend Griffith University.

== Non-fiction career ==
From 1977 Spillman began an association with Griffith University academic Ross Fitzgerald, researching Fitzgerald's book From the Dreaming to 1915: A History of Queensland. The pair later collaborated in compiling a landmark collection of literary writing on Australian rules football, The Greatest Game, as well as Fathers in Writing.

Spillman's first major solo publication was concerning the history of Subiaco, Western Australia, Identity Prized, which was launched by Sir Paul Hasluck, a former Governor-General, at an open-air function attended by more than a thousand people. Spillman returned for a follow-up history of Subiaco some 20 years later. Tied in with writing and research of the Subiaco book, he also conducted interviews which are now part of the Battye Library oral history collection. After completing this book, Spillman worked with Professor Gordon Reid on a thematic history of the Parliament of Australia.

Subsequently, Spillman wrote books on mining in Western Australia, Bankwest, the Shire of Mundaring, the Shire of Victoria Plains, Edith Cowan University, a surf lifesaving club, a ballet college, a major hospital and a number of Western Australian schools and sporting clubs.

According to Rod Moran, former books editor of The West Australian, "Ken Spillman writes history in a marvellously lucid style, one enhanced further by a keen turn of phrase, or sharp observation, at an appropriate moment in the narrative. He writes the history of institutions with a deep sense of their broader context, and underpins his analysis with an admirable command of the primary sources."

In 2008, after the publication of his 17th work of non-fiction, Spillman gave priority to his fiction career. He returned to non-fiction with a history of swimming in Western Australia in 2018 and has continued to publish books of history and biography.

Between 2020 and 2023, Spillman worked with Peter Dowding to unravel the story of Bruce Dowding, a key figure in World War II escape and evasion who was beheaded by the Nazis in 1943.

== Fiction career ==
After a successful full-length fiction debut in 1999 with the highly acclaimed novel Blue, Spillman wrote three children's books with writer and comedian Jon Doust. One of these, Magpie Mischief was shortlisted for a Wilderness Society Environment Award. These collaborations were subsequently re-released as ebooks with new illustrations by James Foley.

Spillman's 2007 novel for teenagers, Love Is a UFO won the Western Australian Premier's Book Awards, but his international success can be traced to the launch of the "Jake" series of books for early readers, which began with Jake's Gigantic List in 2009. A celebration of books and reading, Jake's Gigantic List is dedicated to the Children's Book Council of Australia, to which Spillman has donated royalties. The Jake series has appeared in close to 20 nations and languages, and is especially popular in India.

In 2011, Spillman launched another series for young readers titled The Absolutely True Fantasies of Daydreamer Dev. Four years later, his 12-book "Virtues" series was released in South East Asia. This drew its inspiration from the global, grass-roots Virtues Project, founded in Canada in 1991. Myra Garces-Bacsal, a professor at Singapore's National Institute of Education, wrote of this series: "This series by Ken Spillman demonstrates sensitivity towards children's emotions and profound respect for children's judgement, without being didactic."

Spillman's picture books include The Strange Story of Felicity Frown, The Great Storyteller, Rahul and the Dream Bat, The Auto That Flew, The Magic Bird and Clumsy! He has also written a picture book for all ages titled The Circle. This deals with such issues as deforestation, human displacement, refugees and multiculturalism.

== Selected works ==
=== Non-fiction ===
- (1985) Identity Prized : a history of Subiaco Nedlands, W.A. : University of Western Australia Press for the City of Subiaco ISBN 0-85564-239-4
- (1988) Custodians and Champions : the story of the City of Perth Surf Life Saving Club Perth, W.A : The Club. ISBN 0-7316-4257-0
- (1989) Horizons: A history of the R&I Bank of Western Australia / Nedlands, W.A. : University of Western Australia Press, ISBN 0-85564-303-X
- (1993) A Rich Endowment : government and mining in Western Australia 1829–1994 Nedlands, W.A : University of Western Australia Press for the Dept. of Minerals and Energy in association with the Centre for Western Australian History, the University of Western Australia, ISBN 1-875560-23-8
- (1997) A Club for All Seasons : the story of the Wembley Athletic Club 1926–1996 / by Andy Collins and Ken Spillman. Wembley, W.A. : The Club, 1997. ISBN 0-646-32355-5
- (1998, 2000) Diehards : the story of the Subiaco Football Club Subiaco, W.A. : Subiaco Football Club, 1896–2000. ISBN 0-646-35834-0 (pt. I) ISBN 0-9578185-0-5 (pt. II)
- (2003) Life was meant to be here : community and local government in the Shire of Mundaring Mundaring, W.A. : Shire of Mundaring, ISBN 0-9592776-2-5
- (2005) Hands to the Plough : the Shire of Victoria Plains since 1945 . Calingiri, W.A. : Shire of Victoria Plains. ISBN 0646455877
- (2006) Tales of a Singular City : Subiaco since the 1970s . Subiaco, W.A. : City of Subiaco. ISBN 0-9590016-6-2
- (2006) Raising Edith : the transformation of a new generation university : Edith Cowan University 1995–2005 Mount Lawley, W.A. : Edith Cowan University. ISBN 0-7298-0618-9
- (2007) For the Good of Many: The story of the Australian Pensioners' League and Retirees WA / Perth, W.A.: Retirees WA.
- (2008) Fifty and counting: Sir Charles Gairdner Hospital's first half century / Nedlands, W.A.: Sir Charles Gairdner Hospital. ISBN 978-1-74052-166-6
- (2011) Diehards : the story of the Subiaco Football Club : the glory years / Subiaco Football Club. ISBN 9780957818514
- (2012) Secrets of Reaching 100 : A tribute to 15 Western Australian centenarian women (edited by Ken Spillman) / Bethanie.
- (2014) No Ordinary Days : A journey of activism, globe-trotting and unexpected pleasure (Susan Sygall, co-author) / Outer Hebrides Press. ISBN 9780692253458
- (2018) Buoyant : A History of Swimming in Western Australia / Swimming WA. ISBN 9780646995564
- (2019) The Giving Pantry : Foodbank and hunger relief in Western Australia 1994-2019 / Foodbank Centre for Hunger Relief. ISBN 9780646805153
- (2020) Servants of Australian Communities : Stories from people in Local Government (edited by Ken Spillman) ISBN 9780646822341
- (2021) The Right Spirit : A History of ACC Sport / Associated & Catholic Colleges of Western Australia. ISBN 9780646848563
- (2022) Making a Difference : The Life and Career of Sue Morey / Institute for Respiratory Health (Australia). ISBN 9780646832784
- (2023) More Than I Am : yoga wisdom for 21st century teens (Varuna Shunglu, co-author) / HarperCollins. ISBN 9789356294837
- (2023) Secret Agent, Unsung Hero : the valour of Bruce Dowding (Peter Dowding, co-author) / Pen & Sword Books / ISBN 9781399055444
- (2025) Not By Bread Alone: The Life of Jerome Rodoreda / Abbey Press / ISBN 9781763704121

=== Fiction ===
- (1999) Blue : a novel / South Fremantle, W.A. : Fremantle Press. ISBN 1-86368-244-9
- (2002) Magpie Mischief (Jon Doust, co-author) / South Fremantle, W.A. : Fremantle Press. ISBN 186368355-0
- (2005) Magwheel Madness (Jon Doust, co-author) / South Fremantle, W.A. : Fremantle Press. ISBN 1 92073 1768
- (2007) Love Is a UFO / Sydney, Australia : Pan Macmillan. ISBN 9780330422895
- (2009) Jake's Gigantic List / South Fremantle, W.A. : Fremantle Press. ISBN 978-1-921361-71-5
- (2010) Jake's Monster Mess / South Fremantle, W.A. : Fremantle Press. ISBN 978-1-921696-03-9
- (2010) Jake's Balloon Blast / Kuala Lumpur, Malaysia : Scholastic Inc. ISBN 978-1-921696-55-8
- (2011) Advaita The Writer / Chennai, India : Tulika. ISBN 81-8146-966-6
- (2011) Jake's Great Game / South Fremantle, W.A. : Fremantle Press. ISBN 978-1-921888-50-2
- (2012) Jake's Concert Horror / South Fremantle, W.A. : Fremantle Press. ISBN 978-1-921888-75-5
- (2012) Radhika Takes the Plunge / New Delhi, India : Young Zubaan. ISBN 9789381017265
- (2013) Jake's Cooking Craze / South Fremantle, W.A. : Fremantle Press. ISBN 978-1-922089-10-6
- (2014) I Am Oscar / Gurgaon, India : Scholastic Inc. ISBN 9789351031680
- (2014) The Circle / Singapore: Armour Publishing. ISBN 978-981-4597-09-8
- (2014) The Great Storyteller / Kuala Lumpur, Malaysia : Scholastic Inc. ISBN 978-981-07-9670-9
- (2014) Rahul and the Dream Bat / New Delhi, India : National Book Trust. ISBN 9788123771830
- (2014) Everlasting Tales / Gurgaon, India : Scholastic Inc. ISBN 978-93-5103-700-2
- (2015) The Auto That Flew / Bangalore, India: Pratham Books. ISBN 978-93-5022-277-5
- (2015) All-Time Favourite Fairy Tales: Little Red Riding Hood and Goldilocks / Gurgaon, India : Scholastic Inc. ISBN 978-93-5103-871-9
- (2015) All-Time Favourite Fairy Tales: Beauty and the Beast and Hansel and Gretel / Gurgaon, India : Scholastic Inc. ISBN 978-8-184-77802-1
- (2015) The Magic Bird / Kuala Lumpur, Malaysia : Magicbird Publishing. ISBN 978-967-11719-9-8
- (2015) Jake's Cash Quest / Gurgaon, India : Scholastic Inc. ISBN 978-93-5103-986-0
- (2015) Sophie's Moment of Truth (Virtues Series) / Singapore : Armour. ISBN 978-981-4668-39-2
- (2015) Dylan Owns Up (Virtues Series) / Singapore : Armour. ISBN 978-981-4668-20-0
- (2015) Grace Under Pressure (Virtues Series) / Singapore : Armour. ISBN 978-981-4668-37-8
- (2015) "Nicholas Floats an Idea" (Virtues Series) / Singapore : Armour. ISBN 978-981-4668-38-5
- (2015) James Works It Out (Virtues Series) / Singapore : Armour. ISBN 978-981-4668-19-4
- (2015) Zara's Time to Grow (Virtues Series) / Singapore : Armour. ISBN 978-981-4668-18-7
- (2015) Ethan Makes it Right (Virtues Series) / Singapore : Armour. ISBN 978-981-4597-47-0
- (2015) Tessa Stands Tall (Virtues Series) / Singapore : Armour. ISBN 978-981-4597-45-6
- (2015) Ryan Teams Up (Virtues Series) / Singapore : Armour. ISBN 978-981-4668-18-7
- (2015) Emily's Heart of Gold (Virtues Series) / Singapore : Armour. ISBN 978-981-4597-44-9
- (2015) Brandon's Big Test (Virtues Series) / Singapore : Armour. ISBN 978-981-4597-59-3
- (2015) Mikaela Finds Her Voice (Virtues Series) / Singapore : Armour. ISBN 978-981-4597-98-2
- (2016) Clumsy! / Chennai, India : Tulika. ISBN 935046739-9
- (2016) Aesop's Fables Vol. 1 / Gurgaon, India : Scholastic Inc. ISBN 978-93-86041-02-9
- (2017) Jake’s Concert Horror & Jake’s Cooking Craze – Bind-up Edition / Scholastic Inc. ISBN 9352752457
- (2017) Aesop's Fables Vol. 2 / Scholastic Inc. ISBN 9789352750672
- (2017) All-Time Favourite Fairy Tales : Jack and the Beanstalk and Snow White and the Seven Dwarfs / Scholastic Inc. ISBN 9789386106407
- (2018) Alicia Holds Her Ground (Virtues Series) / Singapore : Little Knights. ISBN 9814807206
- (2018) Sarah Grits Her Teeth (Virtues Series) / Little Knights. ISBN 9814807281
- (2018) Daniel Serves An Ace (Virtues Series) / Little Knights. ISBN 9814807214
- (2018) Elijah’s Lesson in Loyalty (Virtues Series) / Little Knights. ISBN 9814807273
- (2017) Aesop's Fables 6-in-1 / Scholastic Inc. ISBN 9352756347
- (2019) The Absolutely True Adventures of Daydreamer Dev / Puffin. ISBN 9780143449782
- (2020) All-Time Favourite Fairy Tales : Cinderella and Sleeping Beauty / Scholastic Inc. ISBN 9386041030
- (2020) All-Time Favourite Fairy Tales : The Three Little Pigs and The Ugly Duckling / Scholastic Inc. ISBN 9386313588
- (2021) The Astoundingly True Adventures of Daydreamer Dev / Puffin. ISBN 9780143451761
- (2021) My Upside Down World / Pickle Yolk Books. ISBN 9788194859222
- (2022) Big Noah Little Boa / Scholastic Inc. ISBN 9789354712357
- (2022) Aliya’s Day Out / Epigram Books. ISBN 9789814984119
- (2023) The Adventures of Odie : The Journey Begins / Scholastic Inc. ISBN 9789814597593
- (2023) The Adventures of Odie : The Long Way Home / Scholastic Inc. ISBN 9789813431942
- (2023) Fox in the Woods : Sylvie is Not Alone / Scholastic Inc. ISBN 9789813431973
- (2023) Cave Chef : Ooh-La-La / Scholastic Inc. ISBN 9789813431980
- (2023) Cave Chef : Perfect Partners / Scholastic Inc. ISBN 9789813431997
- (2023) Three Eyes the Alien : Breaking Out / Scholastic Inc. ISBN 9789813431911
- (2023) Three Eyes the Alien : Mu’s Raw Talent / Scholastic Inc. ISBN 9789813431966
- (2023) Small Boy & Schubert : A Friend in Need / Scholastic Inc. ISBN 9789813431935
- (2023) Penny’s Pencil : Color Our World / Scholastic Inc. ISBN 9789813431928
- (2023) Ella Gator : Who Am I? / Scholastic Inc. ISBN 9789813431898
- (2023) Ella Gator : Fighting Fire with Fire? / Scholastic Inc. ISBN 9789813431904
