= Paul Llewellyn =

Australian politician

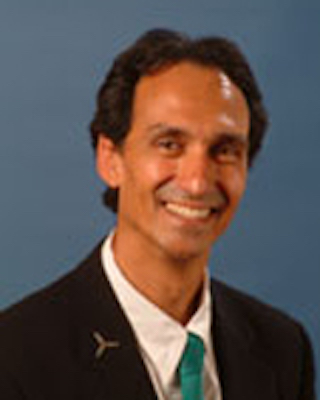

Member of the Western Australian Legislative Council for the South West Region
- In office 22 May 2005 – 21 May 2009

Personal details
- Born: 8 June 1957 (age 69) South Africa
- Citizenship: Australian
- Party: Greens Western Australia
- Education: Murdoch University (BSc, Biology); University of Western Australia (MSc, Natural Resource Management and Policy)
- Occupation: Environmental consultant Company director
- Profession: Environmental planner
- Known for: Renewable energy advocacy Feed-in tariff legislation

Paul Vincent Llewellyn (born 8 June 1957) is an Australian politician. He was part of the Western Australian Legislative Council from 2005 to 2009, where he represented the South West Region (in the state of Western Australia).

== Early life ==
Llewellyn graduated with a Bachelor of Science in biology from Murdoch University in 1977, and a Masters of Science in natural resource management and policy from the University of Western Australia school of Agricultural and Resource Economics in 1984. He has worked as an environmental planning and management consultant, a builder, and wind-energy planner. He has lived and worked in and around the South West for more than 30 years.

== Parliamentary career ==
In 2004, Llewellyn was preselected to appear on the 2005 state election for the Greens WA. In 2005, he was elected to the Western Australian Legislative Council at the as one of the seven members representing the South West region. He was elected for a fixed term, which ran until 21 May 2009. In his inaugural 2005 speech, Llewellyn invited the council to imagine the future of Western Australia in the year 2055.

During his term, he took a leading role in climate, energy and water initiatives. He introduced a range of legislative initiatives into the Parliament, including legislation for renewable energy targets, water conservation targets, solar hot water systems, and emissions controls for power stations. His motion for a gross feed in tariff for renewable energy technologies was passed unanimously through the upper house in 2009.

He retired from the parliament on 21 May 2009.

== Post-political career ==
After leaving parliament, Llewellyn remained active in the renewable energy sector. He became a director of several green energy companies, including Mt Barker Power Company and Denmark Community Windfarm Limited.

== Legacy ==
Llewellyn’s efforts in parliament, particularly his renewable energy legislation, contributed to the expansion of clean energy policy in Western Australia. His initiatives laid a foundation for sustainable energy practices in the region.
