= Nola Marino =

Australian politician (born 1954)

The Honourable Nola Marino
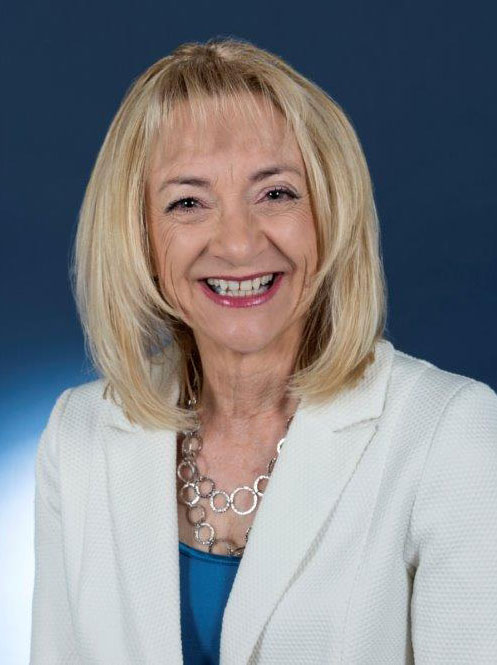
- Official portrait, 2019

Assistant Minister for Regional Development and Territories
- In office 29 May 2019 – 23 May 2022
- Prime Minister: Scott Morrison
- Preceded by: Sussan Ley
- Succeeded by: Anthony Chisholm

Chief Government Whip in the House of Representatives
- In office 27 September 2015 – 29 May 2019
- Prime Minister: Malcolm Turnbull; Scott Morrison
- Preceded by: Scott Buchholz
- Succeeded by: Bert van Manen

Member of the Australian Parliament for Forrest
- In office 24 November 2007 – 28 March 2025
- Preceded by: Geoff Prosser
- Succeeded by: Ben Small

Personal details
- Born: Nola Bethwyn Catalano; 18 February 1954 (age 72) Harvey, Western Australia, Australia
- Party: Liberal
- Spouse: Carmelo Marino (m. 1972)
- Occupation: Dairy farmer Politician
- Website: www.nolamarino.com.au

Nola Bethwyn Marino (née Catalano; born 18 February 1954) is a former Australian politician. She was a member of the House of Representatives from 2007 to 2025, representing the Western Australian seat of Forrest for the Liberal Party. She was Chief Government Whip in the House of Representatives from 2015 to 2019 and served as an assistant minister in the Morrison government from 2019 to 2022.

== Early life ==
Marino was born on 18 February 1954 in Harvey, Western Australia. Her father was born in the United States and her paternal grandparents were born in Messina, Sicily. Her maternal grandfather was born in Kalmar, Sweden.

Marino grew up in Brunswick Junction, Western Australia. Before entering politics she ran a dairy farm with her husband. From 2001 to 2007, she served on the board of Dairy Western Australia, an industry lobby group. She also served as president of the Harvey Bulls Football Club for ten years. In 2017, the South West Football League announced that it would name the best and fairest award in its women's competition the Nola Marino Medal.

== Politics ==
Marino was elected to parliament at the 2007 federal election, succeeding the retiring Geoff Prosser in the Division of Forrest. She is the first woman to represent the electorate, which was established in 1922. In February 2008, Marino was appointed by Brendan Nelson as one of the party whips in the House of Representatives, serving alongside Michael Johnson and Chief Whip Alex Somlyay.

Marino reportedly supported Malcolm Turnbull in the 2015 leadership spill against Tony Abbott. Turnbull subsequently appointed her Chief Government Whip in the House of Representatives, in place of Scott Buchholz. She was the first woman to hold the office. In the lead-up to the 2016 federal election, Marino was challenged for Liberal preselection by Ben Small, the president of the party's Bunbury branch. She won the vote 51–16, with Turnbull sending a letter of support.

After the 2019 federal election, Marino was appointed Assistant Minister for Regional Development and Territories in the Morrison government. She consequently relinquished her position as whip. She remained as an assistant minister until the government's defeat at the 2022 election. She retired from parliament at the 2025 election.

Marino was aligned with the centre-right faction of the Liberal Party during the Morrison government, but by 2023 was viewed as factionally unaligned.

== Personal life ==
In 1972, Marino married Carmelo "Charlie" Marino, an Italian immigrant. During the Australian parliamentary eligibility crisis, it was suggested that she might be a dual citizen of Italy through her marriage. She subsequently released a statement from the Italian consulate in Perth stating that she "is not nor has ever been an Italian citizen".

As of 2024, Marino lived in Harvey, Western Australia, and owned properties in Harvey and Myalup, which she leased out for farming.

Parliament of Australia
Preceded by Geoff Prosser	Member for Forrest; 2007–2025	Succeeded by Ben Small
