= Frank Kirwan =

Australian politician

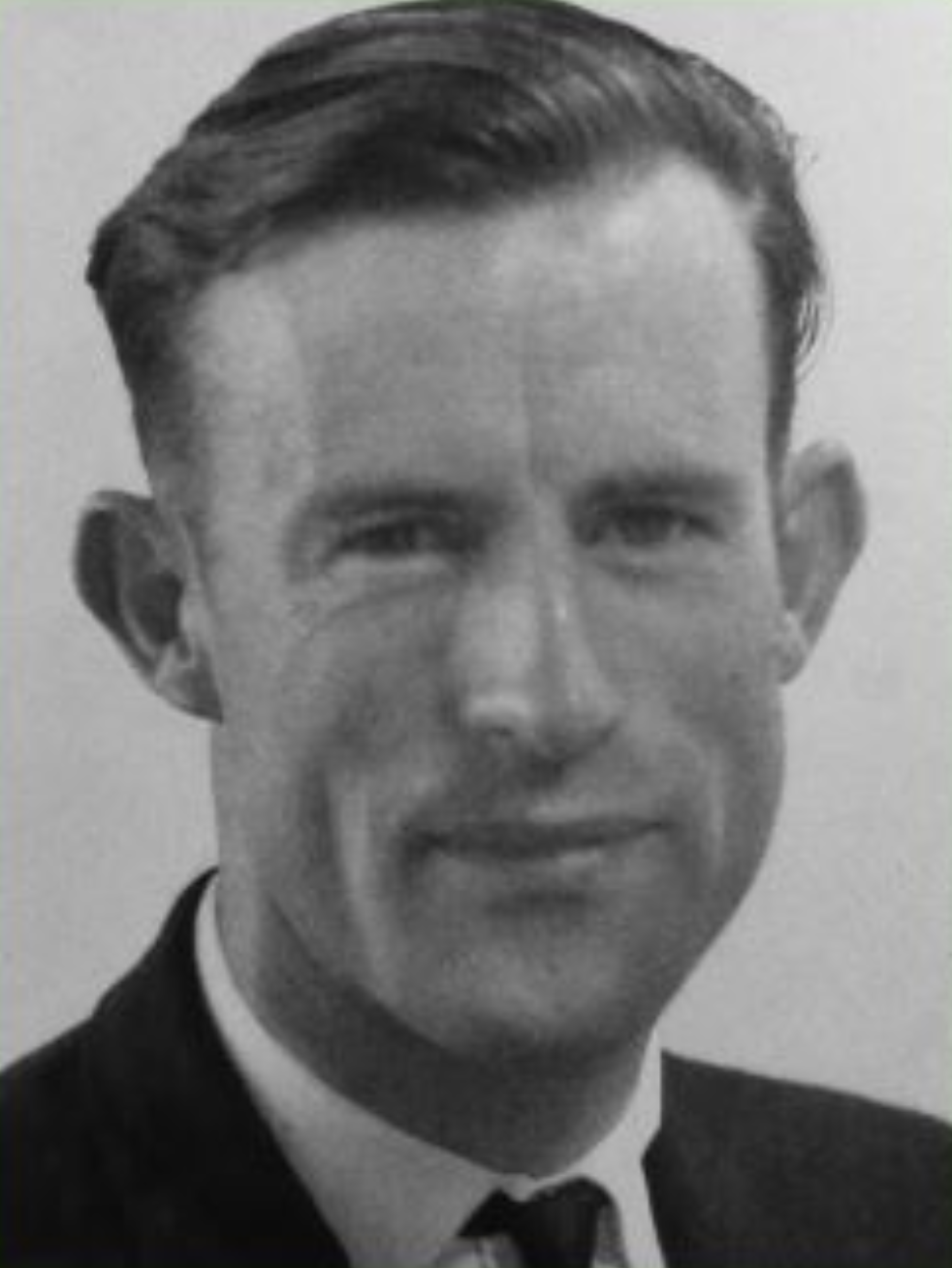

Member of the Australian Parliament for Forrest
- In office 25 October 1969 – 2 December 1972
- Preceded by: Gordon Freeth
- Succeeded by: Peter Drummond

Personal details
- Born: Frank McLeod Kirwan; 23 October 1937 Norseman, Western Australia
- Died: 28 October 1976 (aged 39) Wooroloo, Western Australia
- Party: Labor
- Occupation: Electrician

Frank McLeod Kirwan (23 October 1937 – 28 October 1976) was an Australian politician. He was a member of the Australian Labor Party (ALP) and served in the House of Representatives from 1969 to 1972, representing the Western Australian seat of Forrest. Outside of politics he was an electrical fitter, trade union official and Methodist minister.

== Early life ==
Kirwan was born on 23 October 1937 in Norseman, Western Australia. As a child his family attracted attention when his mother reported a UFO sighting. He was educated at state schools and the School of Mines in Norseman, Western Australia, after which he became an electrical fitter with the Dundas Road Board. He was an official with the Electrical Trades Union.

== Politics ==
Kirwan first stood for the House of Representatives at the 1966 federal election, opposing the incumbent Liberal MP Gordon Freeth. He reprised his candidacy at the 1969 election and unexpectedly defeated Freeth, by then an incumbent cabinet minister in the Gorton government. Freeth's defeat was attributed to remarks he had made as external affairs minister which were seen as not sufficiently anti-communist, causing the Democratic Labor Party to direct its preferences to Kirwan, and to an economic recession in his electorate.

In parliament, Kirwan served as a member of the Joint Standing Committee on Foreign Affairs from 1970 to 1972. He had stood on a platform that included opposition to Australian involvement in the Vietnam War and opposition to conscription. Kirwan was defeated after a single term at the 1972 election, with Peter Drummond reclaiming Forrest for the Liberal Party despite the ALP's overall victory. The seat was a key target for the Liberal Party in Western Australia and was also contested by the Country Party for the first time since 1949 in the person of former state MP David Reid. Kirwan led the count for most of the night, but lost to Drummond after Reid's preferences flowed overwhelmingly to Drummond on the final count.

Kirwan unsuccessfully stood for the Western Australian Legislative Assembly at the 1973 Bunbury state by-election, losing to Liberal candidate John Sibson.

== Personal life ==
Kirwan died on 28 October 1976 in Wooroloo, Western Australia, aged 39.

Kirwan was a Methodist minister. In 1969 he was one of only four members of the House of Representatives to make an affirmation rather than swear an oath of office; they were the first ALP MP's to do so since 1929.

Parliament of Australia
Preceded by Gordon Freeth	Member for Forrest; 1969–1972	Succeeded by Peter Drummond
