= Gordon Freeth =

Australian politician and diplomat

The Honourable Sir Gordon Freeth KBE
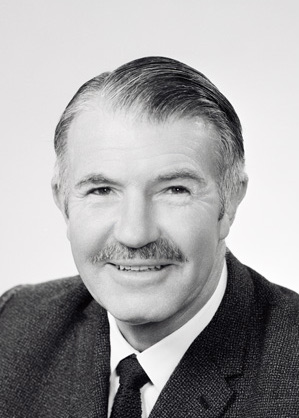

Minister for External Affairs
- In office 11 February 1969 – 12 November 1969
- Prime Minister: John Gorton
- Preceded by: Paul Hasluck
- Succeeded by: William McMahon

Minister for Air
- In office 28 February 1968 – 13 February 1969
- Prime Minister: John Gorton
- Preceded by: Peter Howson
- Succeeded by: Dudley Erwin

Minister for Shipping and Transport
- In office 18 December 1963 – 28 February 1968
- Prime Minister: Robert Menzies; Harold Holt; John McEwen
- Preceded by: Hubert Opperman
- Succeeded by: Ian Sinclair

Minister for the Interior and Works
- In office 10 December 1958 – 18 December 1963
- Prime Minister: Robert Menzies
- Preceded by: Allen Fairhall
- Succeeded by: John Gorton

High Commissioner to the United Kingdom
- In office March 1977 – March 1980
- Preceded by: John Bunting
- Succeeded by: James Plimsoll

Member of the Australian Parliament for Forrest
- In office 10 December 1949 – 25 October 1969
- Preceded by: Nelson Lemmon
- Succeeded by: Frank Kirwan

Personal details
- Born: Gordon Freeth; 6 August 1914 Angaston, South Australia
- Died: 27 November 2001 (aged 87) Perth, Western Australia
- Party: Liberal Party of Australia
- Spouse: Joan Baker (m. 1939; died 1997)
- Children: 3
- Education: University of Western Australia
- Occupation: Lawyer

Gordon Freeth
Medal record

Men's rowing

British Empire Games
Gold medal – first place	1938 Sydney	Coxed four

Sir Gordon Freeth KBE (6 August 1914 – 27 November 2001) was an Australian politician and diplomat. He served in the House of Representatives from 1949 to 1969, including as a minister in the Coalition governments from 1958 to 1969. He later served as Ambassador to Japan from 1970 to 1973 and High Commissioner to the United Kingdom from 1977 to 1980.

== Early life ==
Freeth was born in Angaston, South Australia, the son of Robert Freeth (1886–1979) and Gladys Mary Snashall. He attended Sydney Church of England Grammar School and the Guildford Grammar School in Western Australia, where his father was Headmaster from 1928 to 1949.

In 1937 he rowed in the bow seat of the Western Australian men's eight which contested the King's Cup at the Australian Interstate Regatta. He was awarded a Bachelor of Laws by the University of Western Australia in 1938. That same year he was selected to row for Australia and won a gold medal in the coxed fours in the 1938 British Empire Games in Sydney. In 1939 he married Joan Baker and they had twin daughters, Felicity and Susan and a son, Robert.

In 1939, he began practising law in Katanning, Western Australia. With the outbreak of World War II, he joined the Royal Australian Air Force and he flew Beaufort bombers in New Guinea and had been promoted to flight lieutenant by 1945, when he was demobilised.

== Political career ==
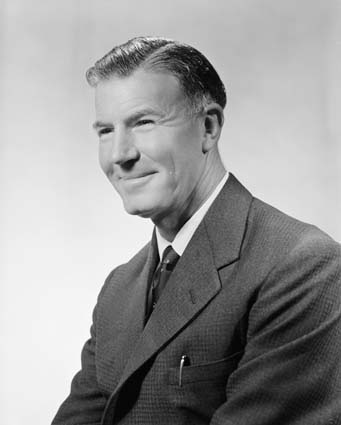
Freeth in 1961.

Freeth was elected as the Liberal member for Forrest in the 1949 election. He actually finished third on the primary vote behind Labor incumbent and minister Nelson Lemmon and the Country Party's Arnold Potts, a hero of both World Wars. On the third count, however, Potts' preferences flowed overwhelmingly to Freeth, allowing Freeth to defeat Lemmon on a swing of 4.4 percent. Freeth would hold the seat comfortably for most of the next two decades.

He was appointed Minister for the Interior and Minister for Works in 1958 and in 1963 he was appointed Minister for Shipping and Transport. In February 1968, he was appointed Minister for Air, replacing Peter Howson.

He was appointed Minister for Foreign Affairs, replacing Paul Hasluck, in February 1969 when Hasluck became Governor-General. In this role, Freeth made some unfortunate comments about relations with Russia, which in the Cold War atmosphere of the times were interpreted as being somewhat 'soft on communism'.

Freeth was defeated at the 1969 election by the Australian Labor Party candidate, Frank Kirwan. His defeat at a time when the government of which he was a part was generally secure was attributed in part to his statements about relations with Russia, but also to discontent by farmers in his largely rural electorate who were suffering a degree of economic recession at the time.

Freeth was Ambassador to Japan from 1970 to 1973 and High Commissioner to the United Kingdom from 1977 to 1980.

== Death ==
Freeth died in Perth in 2001, predeceased by his wife, but survived by his three children.

== Honours ==
Freeth was made a Knight Commander of the Order of the British Empire (KBE) in 1978.

Political offices
Preceded by Allen Fairhall	Minister for the Interior; Minister for Works; 1958–1963	Succeeded by John Gorton
Preceded by Hubert Opperman	Minister for Shipping and Transport; 1963–1968	Succeeded by Ian Sinclair
Preceded by Peter Howson	Minister for Air; 1968–1969	Succeeded by Dudley Erwin
Preceded by Paul Hasluck	Minister for Foreign Affairs; 1969	Succeeded by William McMahon
Parliament of Australia
Preceded by Nelson Lemmon	Member for Forrest; 1949–1969	Succeeded by Frank Kirwan
Diplomatic posts
Preceded by Allen Brown	Australian Ambassador to Japan; 1970–1973	Succeeded by Mick Shann
Preceded by Sir John Bunting	Australian High Commissioner to the United Kingdom; 1977–1980	Succeeded by Sir James Plimsoll
