= Peter Drummond (politician) =

Australian politician

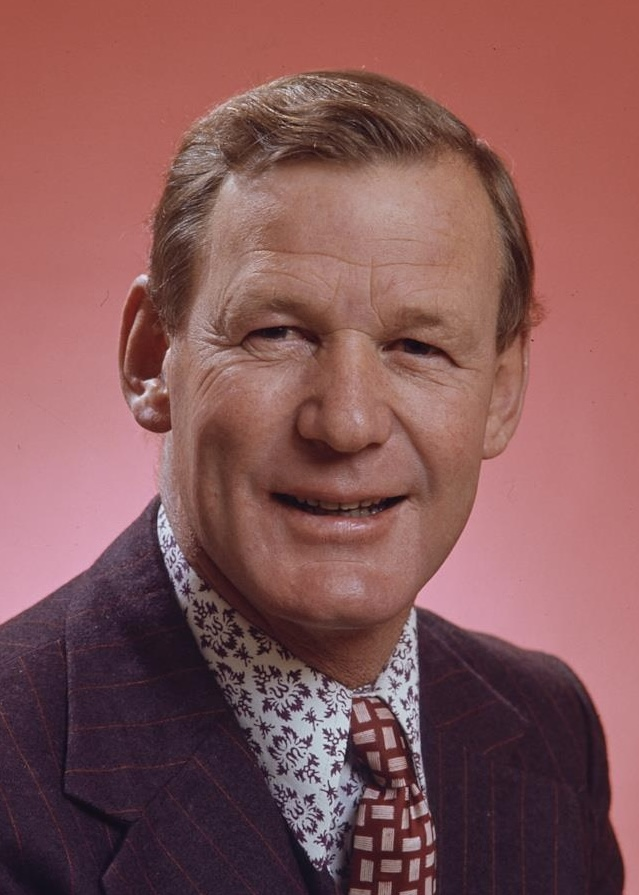
- Drummond in 1974

Member of the Australian Parliament for Forrest
- In office 2 December 1972 – 5 June 1987
- Preceded by: Frank Kirwan
- Succeeded by: Geoff Prosser

Personal details
- Born: 21 August 1931 Wagga Wagga, New South Wales, Australia
- Died: 10 December 2013 (aged 82) Albany, Western Australia, Australia
- Party: Liberal Party of Australia
- Occupation: Farmer

Peter Hertford Drummond (21 August 1931 – 10 December 2013) was an Australian politician. He was a member of the House of Representatives from 1972 to 1987, representing the seat of Forrest for the Liberal Party.

== Early life ==
Drummond was born on 21 August 1931 in Wagga Wagga, New South Wales. He later moved to Western Australia where he was a farmer and grazier.

== Politics ==
Drummond was president of the Mount Barker branch of the Liberal Party from 1970 to 1971. He was an unsuccessful candidate for the seat of Stirling at the 1971 Western Australian state election, narrowly losing to the Country Party candidate Matt Stephens despite the seat being uncontested at the preceding election.

Drummond was elected to the House of Representatives at the 1972 federal election, defeating the incumbent Australian Labor Party (ALP) member Frank Kirwan. He was one of the few Liberal candidates to defeat incumbent Labor MPs at the election, which was attributed to concerns over ALP support for agriculture and forestry. Drummond was re-elected on six further occasions, coming closest to defeat in 1983 when Forrest became the most marginal seat in Western Australia. He was defeated for Liberal preselection in March 1987 by Geoff Prosser, a more business-oriented candidate from Bunbury, the largest population centre in the electorate. He retired from parliament at the 1987 election.

In parliament, Drummond served on a number of parliamentary committees and was a deputy chairman of committees from 1976 to 1987. He was a member of the House Standing Committee on Environment and Conservation from 1980 to 1983 and was involved in the drafting of the Whale Protection Act 1980 which banned whaling in Australia. He unsuccessfully introduced an amendment to remove the extraterritorial jurisdiction from the bill, crossing the floor with five other Liberal backbenchers. In 1973 Drummond intervened on behalf of an American living in his electorate who was being deported for possession of cannabis. He was opposed to apartheid in South Africa and in a 1977 speech to the Inter-Parliamentary Union called for an end to white minority rule in Rhodesia.

== Personal life ==
In 1983, Drummond and his wife were injured in a car accident when a vehicle driven by Senator Reg Withers struck a tree and burst into flames near Donnybrook, Western Australia.

Drummond died on 10 December 2013 in Albany, Western Australia.

Parliament of Australia
Preceded by Frank Kirwan	Member for Forrest; 1972–1987	Succeeded by Geoff Prosser
