= Division of Forrest =

Australian federal electoral division

Coordinates: 33.700°S 115.706°E

Forrest Australian House of Representatives Division
- Interactive map of electorate boundaries from the 2025 federal election
- Created: 1922
- MP: Ben Small
- Party: Liberal
- Namesake: Sir John Forrest
- Electors: 113,148 (2025)
- Area: 11,072 km^{2} (4,274.9 sq mi)
- Demographic: Rural

The Division of Forrest is an Australian Electoral Division in Western Australia.

== Geography ==
Since 1984, federal electoral division boundaries in Australia have been determined at redistributions by a redistribution committee appointed by the Australian Electoral Commission. Redistributions occur for the boundaries of divisions in a particular state, and they occur every seven years, or sooner if a state's representation entitlement changes or when divisions of a state are malapportioned.

== History ==
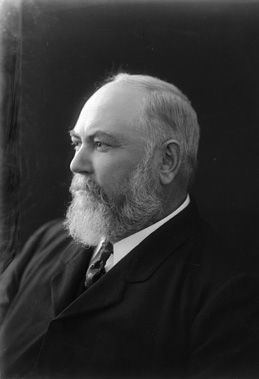
John Forrest, the division's namesake

The division was created in 1922 and is named for John Forrest, the first Premier of Western Australia and a federal Cabinet minister. It is located in the South West region of the state and, as of the 2022 election, includes the Cities of Bunbury and Busselton along with the Shires of Augusta Margaret River, Capel, Dardanup, Donnybrook-Balingup, and Harvey. The Shire of Nannup was previously part of the seat, but was transferred to the neighbouring electorate of O'Connor following a 2021 redistribution.

Before the 1943 election, it was a Country Party seat, but since the 1949 election it has been held by the Liberals for all but one term. Labor has only held the seat for three terms, during the high-tide elections of 1943 and 1946, and in the midst of the Coalition's near-defeat of 1969. It reverted to the Liberals in 1972 even as Labor won government. The seat was marginal for most of the 1980s, but a 1990 redistribution made the seat much more secure for the Liberals. In 2022, amidst a statewide collapse of Liberal Party support, sitting member Nola Marino suffered a swing of over 10 percent, leaving her holding the seat on a 4.29 percent margin.

Notable members include Nelson Lemmon, a minister in the Chifley Government, Gordon Freeth, a minister in the Menzies, Holt and Gorton governments, and Geoff Prosser, a minister in the Howard government.

== Members ==
Image	Member	Party	Term	Notes
	John Prowse (1871–1944)	Country	16 December 1922 – 21 August 1943	Previously held the Division of Swan. Lost seat
	Nelson Lemmon (1908–1989)	Labor	21 August 1943 – 10 December 1949	Served as minister under Chifley. Lost seat. Later elected to the Division of St George in 1954
	Gordon Freeth (1914–2001)	Liberal	10 December 1949 – 25 October 1969	Served as minister under Menzies, Holt, McEwen and Gorton. Lost seat
	Frank Kirwan (1937–1976)	Labor	25 October 1969 – 2 December 1972	Lost seat
	Peter Drummond (1931–2013)	Liberal	2 December 1972 – 5 June 1987	Retired
	Geoff Prosser (1948–)	Liberal	11 July 1987 – 17 October 2007	Served as minister under Howard. Retired
	Nola Marino (1954–)	Liberal	24 November 2007 – 28 March 2025	Served as Chief Government Whip in the House under Turnbull and Morrison. Retired
	Ben Small (1988–)	Liberal	3 May 2025 – present	Previously a member of the Senate. Incumbent

== Election results ==
2025 Australian federal election: Forrest
Party	Candidate	Votes	%	±%
Liberal	Ben Small	31,011	31.18	−11.89
Labor	Tabitha Dowding	22,423	22.55	−5.03
Independent	Sue Chapman	18,206	18.31	+18.31
One Nation	Paul van der Mey	8,670	8.72	+3.47
Greens	Georgia Beardman	7,840	7.88	−5.57
Legalise Cannabis	Aaron Peet	5,131	5.16	+5.16
National	Cam Parsons	4,771	4.80	+4.80
Trumpet of Patriots	Peter Greenland	1,405	1.41	+0.23
Total formal votes		99,457	94.79	+0.02
Informal votes		5,465	5.21	−0.02
Turnout		104,922	89.31	+4.30
Two-party-preferred result
Liberal	Ben Small	51,952	52.24	−1.95
Labor	Tabitha Dowding	47,505	47.76	+1.95
Liberal hold		Swing	−1.95	
