= Geoff Prosser =

Australian politician

The Honourable Geoff Prosser

Minister for Small Business and Consumer Affairs
- In office 11 March 1996 – 11 July 1997
- Prime Minister: John Howard
- Preceded by: Chris Schacht (Small Business); Jeannette McHugh (Consumer Affairs)
- Succeeded by: Peter Reith (Small Business); Chris Ellison (Consumer Affairs)

Member of the Australian Parliament for Forrest
- In office 11 July 1987 – 17 October 2007
- Preceded by: Peter Drummond
- Succeeded by: Nola Marino

Personal details
- Born: 6 November 1948 (age 77) Bunbury, Western Australia, Australia
- Party: Liberal Party of Australia
- Spouse: Lucy Hough
- Occupation: Businessman

Geoffrey Daniel Prosser (born 6 November 1948) is an Australian businessman and former politician. He served in the House of Representatives from 1987 to 2007, representing the Liberal Party, and was Minister for Small Business and Consumer Affairs in the Howard government from 1996 to 1997.

== Early life ==
Prosser was born in Bunbury, Western Australia, and was a self-employed businessman and company director before entering politics. He was a member of the Bunbury City Council 1979–85.

== Federal Parliament ==
Prosser was a member of the Opposition Shadow Ministry from 1990 to 1996. After the Liberal Party's election at the March 1996 election, he was appointed Small Business and Consumer Affairs in the Howard ministry.

On the basis of Liberal prime minister John Howard's 1996 Guide on Key Elements of Ministerial Behaviour, Prosser was forced to return to the backbench July 1997 because of improper business dealings. He continued to be a major retail landlord, and this was seen to conflict with his responsibilities as Minister for Small Business and Consumer Affairs.

Prosser was believed to have been one of the wealthiest members of the House, if not the wealthiest, during his time as the member for Forrest. In 2010 his estimated net worth was $186 million.

On Saturday, 3 March 2007 The Australian newspaper published allegations made by former Western Australia Premier Brian Burke that Prosser was a client of his and that Prosser had paid for lobbying services. The paper also alleged that Prosser was recently seen dining with Julian Grill, Burke's business partner.

Prosser retired from parliament at the 2007 federal election.

== Later activities ==
In August 2011 he was elected president of the Western Australian division of the Liberal Party, succeeding Barry Court.

Political offices
Preceded by Chris Schacht (small business); Jeannette McHugh (consumer affairs)	Small Business and Consumer Affairs; 1996–97	Succeeded by Peter Reith (small business); Chris Ellison (consumer affairs)
Parliament of Australia
Preceded by Peter Drummond	Member for Forrest; 1987–2007	Succeeded by Nola Marino
