= Dickson in the 2025 Australian federal election =

2025 Australian federal election (Dickson)
- 3 May 2025

Division of Dickson (Qld) in the House of Representatives
- Opinion polls
- Registered: 119,401
- Turnout: 92.36% (▲1.01)
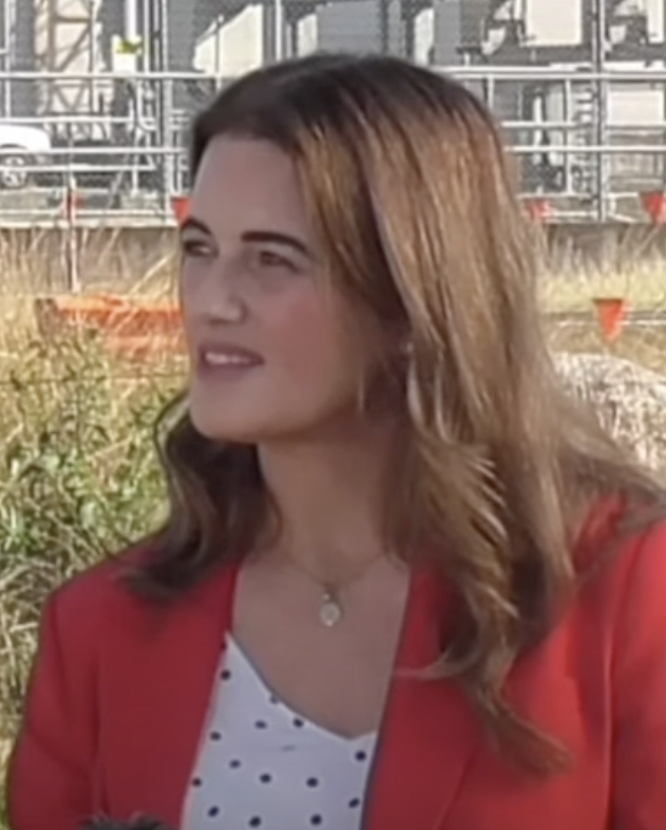

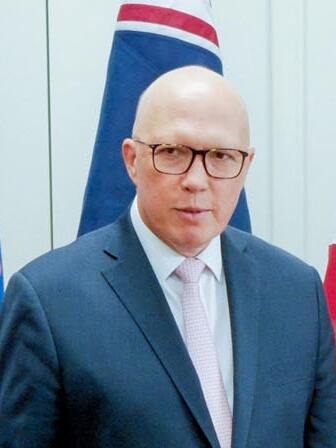
	First party	Second party	Third party
			IND
Candidate	Ali France	Peter Dutton	Ellie Smith
Party	Labor	Liberal National	Independent
Primary vote	35,502	36,628	12,874
Percentage	33.63%	34.69%	12.19%
Swing	▲1.93	▼7.38	▲12.19
TPP	55.99%	44.01%
TPP swing	▲7.69	▼7.69
MP before election
Peter Dutton
Liberal National
Elected MP
Ali France
Labor

An election in the Queensland electorate of Dickson took place on 3 May 2025 as part of the 2025 Australian federal election. Incumbent Liberal National Party (LNP) MP Peter Dutton, who was also serving as the leader of the opposition and the leader of the Liberal Party, stood for re-election against eight candidates.

In what several media outlets described as a "stunning" result, Dutton lost his seat to Australian Labor Party (ALP) candidate Ali France after a 7.7% two-party-preferred vote swing. It was the first time that a federal opposition leader had been defeated in their own seat.

== Background ==
Peter Dutton was elected as the member for Dickson in 2001 after defeating sitting Labor MP Cheryl Kernot. He was re-elected in 2004 with a positive swing, but came close to losing his seat in 2007, retaining it with a two-party-preferred (TPP) vote of 50.1% against Labor.

At the 2019 federal election, Labor preselected former journalist and para-athlete Ali France as its candidate. Dutton was re-elected with a 2.95% TPP swing after a stronger-than-expected showing for the LNP across Queensland. In 2022, France contested Dickson again, with Dutton re-elected despite a 1.7% TPP swing.

== Candidates ==
Candidates are listed in the order they appeared on the ballot.

Party	Candidate	Background
Family First	Suniti Hewett	Candidate for Morayfield at the 2024 state election
Labor	Ali France	Candidate for Dickson in 2019 and 2022
Greens	Vinnie Batten	Candidate for Dickson in 2022
One Nation	Joel Stevenson	Maintenance industrial electrician
Liberal National	Peter Dutton	Member for Dickson since 2001
Trumpet of Patriots	Michael Jessop	Businessman
Independent	Ellie Smith	Environmental consultant
Legalise Cannabis	David Zaloudek	Cannabis activist
Animal Justice	Maureen Brohman	Primary school teacher

=== Liberal National ===
Dutton was seeking a ninth term as the member for Dickson. He became leader of the opposition on 30 May 2022 after the resignation of former prime minister Scott Morrison.

=== Labor ===
France was announced as Labor's candidate on 11 July 2024, holding a press conference with prime minister Anthony Albanese the following day.

=== Independent ===
Environmental consultant Ellie Smith announced her candidacy on 27 January 2025. She was endorsed by Climate 200, which supported 35 "teal independent" candidates at the 2025 federal election.

=== Greens ===
On 23 December 2024, environmental scientist and para-athlete Vinnie Batten was announced as the Greens' candidate. He contested the seat in 2022.

== Campaign ==
Albanese visited Dickson on the first day of the election campaign. According to Guardian Australia, Labor nonetheless did not initially consider the seat a priority, until they were alerted of polling by Climate 200, an organisation supporting independent candidate Ellie Smith. After Labor's own polling found the seat too close to call, they devoted more resources to it.

On 18 April 2025, journalist Karen Middleton reported that the Liberals "[weren't] concerned" about the possibility of losing Dickson. Australian Broadcasting Corporation (ABC) election analyst Casey Briggs listed Dickson as one of six "potential wildcard" electorates.

== Endorsements ==
List of endorsements in Dickson at the 2025 federal election

Peter Dutton (LNP)

- Tony Abbott – prime minister (2013–2015)
- Nigel Farage – leader of Reform UK and MP for Clacton (UK)
- John Howard – prime minister (1996–2007)
- Scott Morrison – prime minister (2018–2022)
- Paul Murray – Sky News Australia presenter

Ali France (Labor)

- EMILY's List Australia
- Peter Lawlor – former Labor member of the Queensland Legislative Assembly (candidate's father)

Ellie Smith (independent)

- Climate 200
- Dickson Decides
- Vote Climate One (co-endorsement)

Vinnie Batten (Greens)

- Vote Climate One (co-endorsement)

David Zaloudek (Legalise Cannabis)

- Vote Climate One (co-endorsement)

Maureen Brohman (Animal Justice)

- Vote Climate One (co-endorsement)

Did not make specific endorsement

- Abbie Chatfield – media personality (supported voting against Dutton)
- Hannah Ferguson – CEO of Cheek Media (supported voting against Dutton)

== How-to-vote cards ==
Labor's Ali France preferenced the Greens second, the LNP's Dutton sixth, and One Nation last. Dutton preferenced One Nation third, above Labor at seventh, and the Greens last at ninth.

Ellie Smith ran an open ticket, as many other "teal independents" did during the election; recommending voters preference her first with no further directions for preferencing other candidates.

Candidate	How-to-vote cards (read column top down)								
Candidate	FFP	ALP	GRN	ONP	LNP	TOP	Smt.	LCP	AJP
Suniti Hewett (FFP)	1	7	7	3	2	2	—N/a	9	7
Ali France (ALP)	6	1	5	7	7	6	—N/a	5	2
Vinnie Batten (GRN)	9	2	1	9	9	8	—N/a	4	4
Joel Stevenson (ONP)	2	9	9	1	3	3	—N/a	8	8
Peter Dutton (LNP)	4	6	6	4	1	9	—N/a	6	6
Michael Jessop (TOP)	3	8	8	2	8	1	—N/a	7	9
Ellie Smith (IND)	5	5	4	8	6	7	1	3	5
David Zaloudek (LCP)	7	4	3	5	5	4	—N/a	1	3
Maureen Brohman (AJP)	8	3	2	6	4	5	—N/a	2	1

== Results ==
2025 Australian federal election: Dickson
Party	Candidate	Votes	%	±%
Liberal National	Peter Dutton	36,628	34.69	−7.38
Labor	Ali France	35,502	33.63	+1.93
Independent	Ellie Smith	12,874	12.19	+12.19
Greens	Vinnie Batten	8,061	7.64	−5.36
One Nation	Joel Stevenson	4,429	4.19	−1.17
Legalise Cannabis	David Zaloudek	2,950	2.79	+2.79
Family First	Suniti Hewett	2,299	2.18	+2.18
Trumpet of Patriots	Michael Jessop	1,900	1.80	+1.80
Animal Justice	Maureen Brohman	936	0.89	+0.89
Total formal votes		105,579	95.76	−0.36
Informal votes		4,676	4.24	+0.36
Turnout		110,255	92.36	+1.01
Two-party-preferred result
Labor	Ali France	59,115	55.99	+7.69
Liberal National	Peter Dutton	46,464	44.01	−7.69
Labor gain from Liberal National		Swing	+7.69	

== Opinion polling ==
Date	Firm	Sample size	Margin of error	Primary vote						2PP vote	
Date	Firm	Sample size	Margin of error	LNP	ALP	GRN	ONP	IND	OTH	LNP	ALP
3 May 2025	2025 federal election			34.7%	33.6%	7.6%	4.3%	12.2%	7.7%	44.0%	56.0%
17–24 Apr 2025	YouGov	253	±6%	40.3%	24.2%	7.6%	5.4%	16.5%	6.0% (Note: 1.3% for Trumpet of Patriots and 4.7% for all others.)	55%	45%
18–23 Apr 2025	DemosAU (Note: The polling figures are a combined primary vote average from the electorates of Bonner, Dickson, Forde, Longman and Petrie.)	1,053	±4.3%	40%	27%	13%	7%	5%	8% (Note: 3% for Family First, 2% for Legalise Cannabis, 2% for Trumpet of Patriots, 1% for the Australian Citizens Party, 0% for the Animal Justice Party and 0% for the Libertarian Party.)	53%	47%
10 Apr 2025 (released)	Freshwater Strategy (Note: Commissioned by the Liberal Party.)	—N/a	—N/a	—N/a	—N/a	—N/a	—N/a	—N/a	—N/a	57%	43%
10 Apr 2025 (released)	uComms (Note: Commissioned by Climate 200.)	—N/a	—N/a	—N/a	—N/a	—N/a	—N/a	—N/a	—N/a	48.3%	51.7%
9–10 Apr 2025	uComms (Note: Commissioned by the Queensland Conservation Council.)	854	—N/a	37.6%	24.2%	10.9%	—N/a	12.0%	4.6%	48%	52%
27 Feb – 26 Mar 2025	YouGov (MRP)	10,217	—N/a	39.7%	28.8%	12.7%	8.6%	7.8%	2.4%	52.5%	47.5%
22 Jan – 12 Feb 2025	YouGov (MRP)	8,732	—N/a	41.3%	28.2%	12.3%	8.8%	8.2%	1.2%	53.9%	46.1%
29 Oct – 20 Nov 2024	Accent/RedBridge (MRP)	4,909	—N/a	48%	33%	6%	—N/a	—N/a	12%	56%	44%
10 Jul – 27 Aug 2024	Accent/RedBridge (MRP)	5,976	—N/a	42%	30%	9%	—N/a	—N/a	19%	55%	45%
21 May 2022	2022 federal election			42.1%	31.7%	13%	5.4%	3.9%	4.0%	51.7%	48.3%

== Aftermath ==
On election night, Dutton conceded defeat to France and resigned as Leader of the Opposition. The result marked the first time in Australian political history that a federal Opposition Leader lost their seat at an election. Dutton's loss in Dickson was largely attributed to the federal Coalition's poor election campaign, Dutton's leadership style, and his absence from the electorate in the lead up to Cyclone Alfred.

On 13 May 2025, Sussan Ley won the Liberal Party leadership election the following week, succeeding Dutton as Opposition Leader.

== See also ==
- Results of the 2025 Australian federal election in Queensland
- Electoral results for the Division of Dickson
