= Results of the 2019 Australian federal election in Queensland =

2019 Australian federal election (Queensland)
← 2016	18 May 2019	2022 →

All 30 Queensland seats in the House of Representatives and 6 seats in the Australian Senate
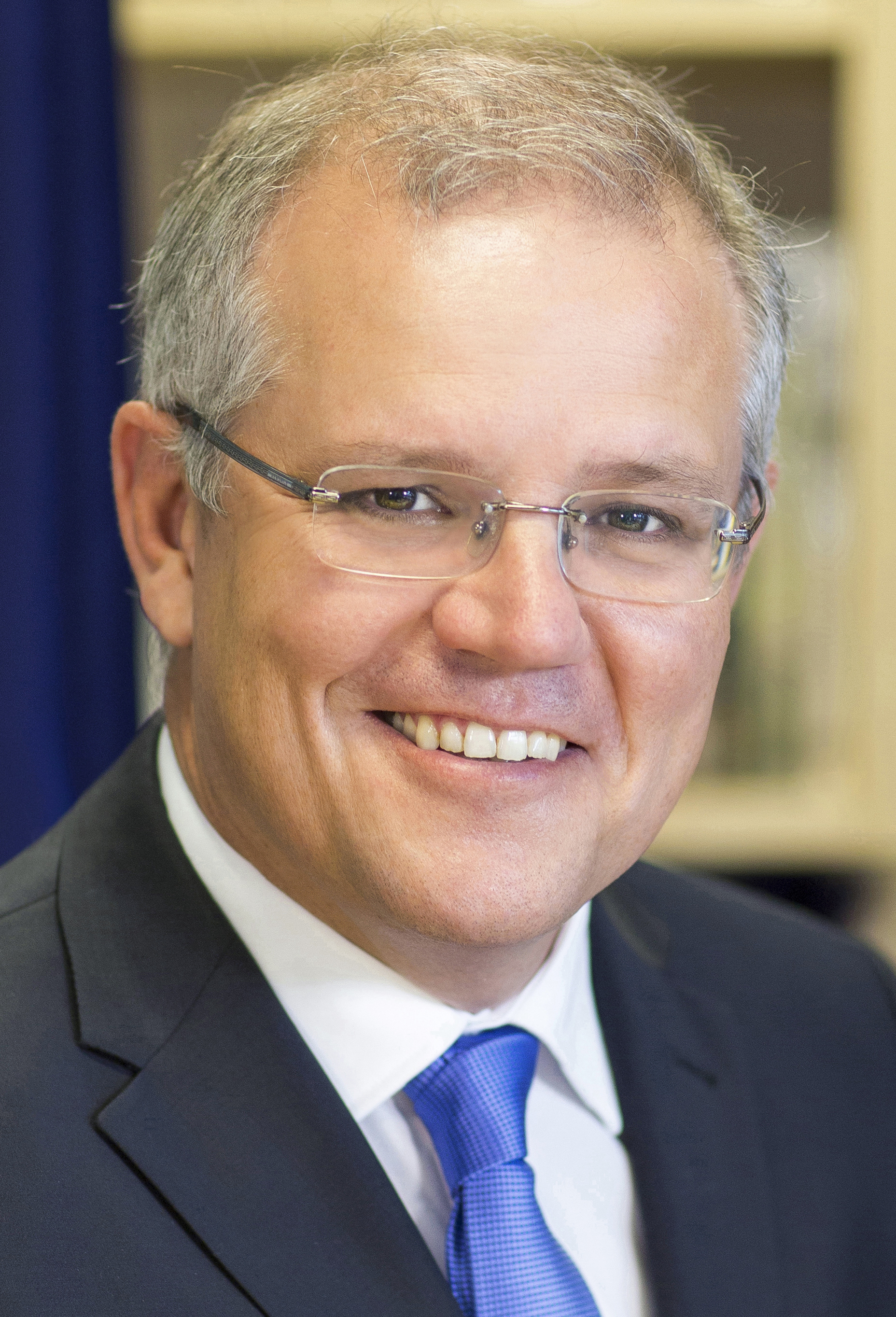

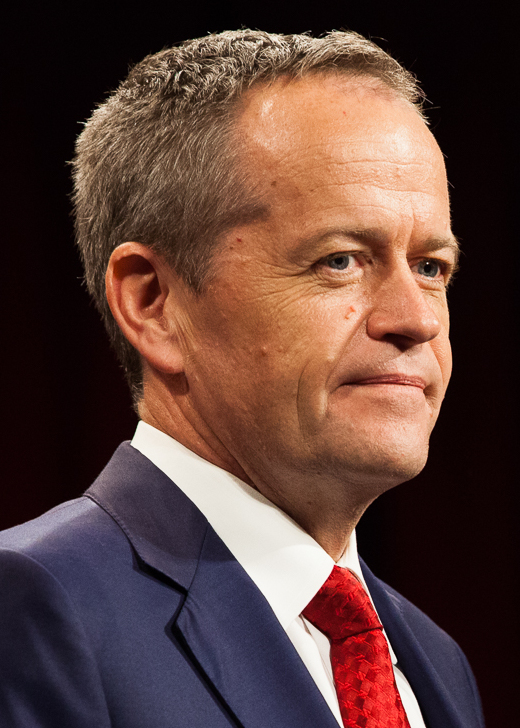

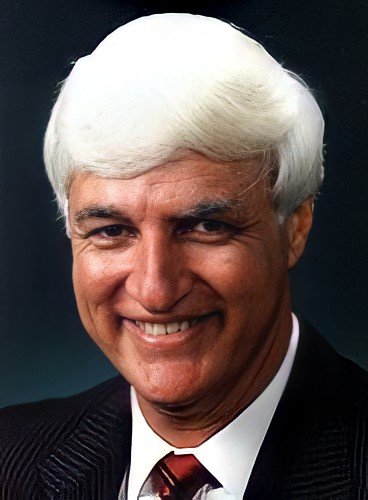
	First party	Second party	Third party
Leader	Scott Morrison	Bill Shorten	Bob Katter
Party	Coalition	Labor	Katter's Australian
Leader since			3 June 2011
Leader's seat			Kennedy (Qld.)
Last election	21 seats	8 seats	1 seat
Seats won	23 seats	6 seats	1 seat
Seat change	▲2	▼2	Steady
Popular vote	1,236,401	754,792	69,736
Percentage	43.70%	26.68%	2.47%
Swing	▲0.51	▼4.23	▼0.26
TPP	58.44%	41.56%
TPP swing	▲4.34	▼4.34
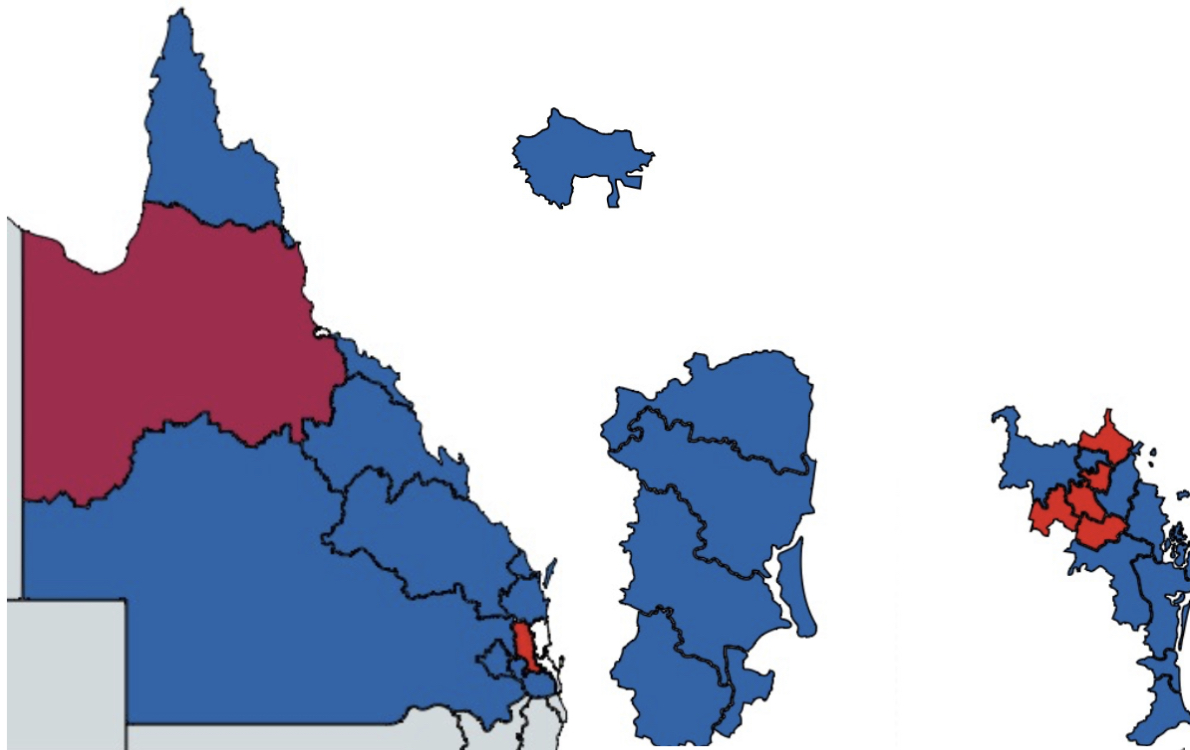
- Results by electorate.

This is a list of electoral division results for the 2019 Australian federal election in the state of Queensland.

This election was held using instant-runoff voting. At this election, there were three "turn-overs" in Queensland. Labor won the seats of Griffith, Lilley and Moreton despite the LNP finishing first.

== Overall results ==
Party	Votes	%	Swing	Seats	Change
Liberal National Party	1,236,401	43.70	+0.51	23	▲2
Australian Labor Party	754,792	26.68	−4.23	6	▼2
Australian Greens	292,059	10.32	+1.49		
Pauline Hanson's One Nation	250,779	8.86	+3.34		
United Australia Party	99,329	3.51	+3.51		
Katter's Australian Party	69,736	2.47	−0.26	1	Steady
Fraser Anning's Conservative National Party	49,581	1.75	+1.75		
Liberal Democratic Party	12,835	0.45	−0.51		
Animal Justice Party	12,579	0.44	+0.44		
Democratic Labour Party	6,890	0.24	+0.18		
Love Australia or Leave	1,564	0.06	+0.06		
Socialist Alliance	1,457	0.05	+0.05		
Sustainable Australia	1,410	0.05	+0.05		
Australia First Party	1,069	0.04	+0.04		
Australian Progressives	965	0.03	+0.03		
Socialist Equality Party	654	0.02	+0.02		
Independent	35,894	1.27	−0.62		
Non Affiliated	1,024	0.04	+0.01		
Total	2,829,018			30	
Two-party-preferred vote
Liberal National	1,653,261	58.44	+4.34		▲2
Labor	1,175,757	41.56	−4.34		▼2
Invalid/blank votes	147,290	4.95	+0.25	–	–
Registered voters/turnout	3,262,898	91.22	+0.05	–	–
Source: AEC Tally Room

== Results by division ==
=== Blair ===
2019 Australian federal election: Blair
Party	Candidate	Votes	%	±%
Labor	Shayne Neumann	29,987	31.26	−9.79
Liberal National	Robert Shearman	27,844	29.03	−0.58
One Nation	Sharon Bell	16,114	16.80	+1.90
Greens	Michelle Duncan	8,325	8.68	+1.97
Independent	Simone Karandrews	3,849	4.01	+4.01
United Australia	Majella Zimpel	3,261	3.40	+3.40
Democratic Labour	John Quinn	2,418	2.52	+2.40
Independent	John Turner	2,118	2.21	+0.06
Conservative National	Peter Fitzpatrick	2,009	2.09	+2.09
Total formal votes		95,925	92.51	−1.92
Informal votes		7,765	7.49	+1.92
Turnout		103,690	91.34	+0.17
Two-party-preferred result
Labor	Shayne Neumann	49,123	51.21	−6.93
Liberal National	Robert Shearman	46,802	48.79	+6.93
Labor hold		Swing	−6.93	

=== Bonner ===
2019 Australian federal election: Bonner
Party	Candidate	Votes	%	±%
Liberal National	Ross Vasta	46,616	49.49	+3.05
Labor	Jo Briskey	29,291	31.10	−3.76
Greens	Barbara Bell	11,010	11.69	+2.22
One Nation	Ian Symes	3,771	4.00	+4.00
United Australia	Simon Flitcroft	2,394	2.54	+2.54
Conservative National	Alex Maynard	1,105	1.17	+1.17
Total formal votes		94,187	97.07	+0.13
Informal votes		2,840	2.93	−0.13
Turnout		97,027	92.76	+0.82
Two-party-preferred result
Liberal National	Ross Vasta	54,072	57.41	+4.02
Labor	Jo Briskey	40,115	42.59	−4.02
Liberal National hold		Swing	+4.02	

=== Bowman ===
2019 Australian federal election: Bowman
Party	Candidate	Votes	%	±%
Liberal National	Andrew Laming	47,866	48.67	−1.10
Labor	Tom Baster	26,147	26.59	−5.46
Greens	Emerald Moon	11,795	11.99	+2.23
One Nation	Glen Wadsworth	7,175	7.30	+7.30
United Australia	Shane Clarke	3,540	3.60	+3.60
Conservative National	David Anderson	1,816	1.85	+1.85
Total formal votes		98,339	96.60	+0.41
Informal votes		3,465	3.40	−0.41
Turnout		101,804	93.04	+0.38
Two-party-preferred result
Liberal National	Andrew Laming	59,237	60.24	+3.17
Labor	Tom Baster	39,102	39.76	−3.17
Liberal National hold		Swing	+3.17	

=== Brisbane ===
2019 Australian federal election: Brisbane
Party	Candidate	Votes	%	±%
Liberal National	Trevor Evans	48,777	47.84	−2.09
Labor	Paul Newbury	24,970	24.49	−1.42
Greens	Andrew Bartlett	22,807	22.37	+2.94
One Nation	Anne Perry	2,537	2.49	+2.49
United Australia	Aaron Whittaker	1,420	1.39	+1.39
Conservative National	Rod Jeanneret	732	0.72	+0.72
Socialist Alliance	Kamala Emanuel	714	0.70	+0.70
Total formal votes		101,957	97.48	−0.14
Informal votes		2,631	2.52	+0.14
Turnout		104,588	90.51	+0.67
Two-party-preferred result
Liberal National	Trevor Evans	55,995	54.92	−1.08
Labor	Paul Newbury	45,962	45.08	+1.08
Liberal National hold		Swing	−1.08	

=== Capricornia ===
2019 Australian federal election: Capricornia
Party	Candidate	Votes	%	±%
Liberal National	Michelle Landry	36,163	40.65	+0.59
Labor	Russell Robertson	21,120	23.74	−14.33
One Nation	Wade Rothery	15,105	16.98	+16.98
Greens	Paul Bambrick	4,307	4.84	+0.12
Katter's Australian	George Birkbeck	3,269	3.67	−3.40
United Australia	Lindsay Sturgeon	3,250	3.65	+3.65
Independent	Ken Murray	2,211	2.49	−2.35
Conservative National	Grant Pratt	1,905	2.14	+2.14
Democratic Labour	Richard Temple	1,637	1.84	+1.84
Total formal votes		88,967	93.67	−2.76
Informal votes		6,008	6.33	+2.76
Turnout		94,975	92.58	−0.47
Two-party-preferred result
Liberal National	Michelle Landry	55,475	62.35	+11.72
Labor	Russell Robertson	33,492	37.65	−11.72
Liberal National hold		Swing	+11.72	

=== Dawson ===
2019 Australian federal election: Dawson
Party	Candidate	Votes	%	±%
Liberal National	George Christensen	38,164	42.95	+0.32
Labor	Belinda Hassan	18,022	20.28	−12.48
One Nation	Debra Lawson	11,628	13.09	+13.09
Katter's Australian	Brendan Bunyan	5,619	6.32	−0.22
United Australia	Colin Thompson	4,355	4.90	+4.90
Greens	Imogen Lindenberg	4,009	4.51	−0.65
Democratic Labour	Ann-Maree Ware	2,835	3.19	+3.19
Independent	Lachlan Queenan	2,478	2.79	+2.79
Conservative National	Michael Turner	1,741	1.96	+1.96
Total formal votes		88,851	92.99	−2.47
Informal votes		6,699	7.01	+2.47
Turnout		95,550	90.79	−0.90
Two-party-preferred result
Liberal National	George Christensen	57,405	64.61	+11.24
Labor	Belinda Hassan	31,446	35.39	−11.24
Liberal National hold		Swing	+11.24	

=== Dickson ===
2019 Australian federal election: Dickson
Party	Candidate	Votes	%	±%
Liberal National	Peter Dutton	44,528	45.93	+1.23
Labor	Ali France	30,370	31.33	−3.66
Greens	Benedict Coyne	9,675	9.98	+0.13
One Nation	Carrol Halliwell	5,022	5.18	+5.18
Independent	Thor Prohaska	2,302	2.37	−1.04
United Australia	Steve Austin	2,176	2.24	+2.24
Animal Justice	Maureen Brohman	1,831	1.89	+1.89
Conservative National	Richelle Simpson	1,044	1.08	+1.08
Total formal votes		96,948	95.64	−1.02
Informal votes		4,416	4.36	+1.02
Turnout		101,364	93.67	−0.18
Two-party-preferred result
Liberal National	Peter Dutton	52,968	54.64	+2.95
Labor	Ali France	43,980	45.36	−2.95
Liberal National hold		Swing	+2.95	

=== Fadden ===
2019 Australian federal election: Fadden
Party	Candidate	Votes	%	±%
Liberal National	Stuart Robert	47,359	48.72	−0.67
Labor	Luz Stanton	21,882	22.51	−3.48
Greens	Scott Turner	8,747	9.00	+1.39
One Nation	Darren Eather	8,334	8.57	−3.40
United Australia	Mara Krischker	4,968	5.11	+5.11
Liberal Democrats	Jake Welch	4,391	4.52	+4.52
Conservative National	Allan Barber	1,531	1.57	+1.57
Total formal votes		97,212	95.09	−0.42
Informal votes		5,019	4.91	+0.42
Turnout		102,231	89.63	+1.59
Two-party-preferred result
Liberal National	Stuart Robert	62,387	64.18	+2.94
Labor	Luz Stanton	34,825	35.82	−2.94
Liberal National hold		Swing	+2.94	

=== Fairfax ===
2019 Australian federal election: Fairfax
Party	Candidate	Votes	%	±%
Liberal National	Ted O'Brien	48,451	49.62	+1.12
Labor	Julie McGlone	20,976	21.48	+0.85
Greens	Sue Etheridge	12,291	12.59	−0.07
One Nation	Paul Henselin	7,661	7.85	−1.83
United Australia	Kylie Cowling	2,987	3.06	+3.06
Conservative National	Jake Ryan	1,502	1.54	+1.54
Sustainable Australia	Richard Belcher	1,410	1.44	+1.44
Independent	Sinim Australie	1,318	1.35	+1.35
Liberal Democrats	Bertrand Cadart	1,044	1.07	+1.07
Total formal votes		97,640	93.57	−0.19
Informal votes		6,715	6.43	+0.19
Turnout		104,355	91.44	+0.62
Two-party-preferred result
Liberal National	Ted O'Brien	61,944	63.44	+2.57
Labor	Julie McGlone	35,696	36.56	−2.57
Liberal National hold		Swing	+2.57	

=== Fisher ===
2019 Australian federal election: Fisher
Party	Candidate	Votes	%	±%
Liberal National	Andrew Wallace	49,567	50.04	+1.83
Labor	Daniel Parsell	22,011	22.22	−2.26
Greens	Tracy Burton	12,289	12.41	+0.11
One Nation	Christopher Paterson	8,596	8.68	+8.20
United Australia	Trevor Gray	3,429	3.46	+3.46
Conservative National	Mike Jessop	1,592	1.61	+1.61
Love Australia or Leave	Paul Monaghan	1,564	1.58	+1.58
Total formal votes		99,048	95.20	+2.01
Informal votes		4,992	4.80	−2.01
Turnout		104,040	91.96	+0.86
Two-party-preferred result
Liberal National	Andrew Wallace	62,100	62.70	+3.55
Labor	Daniel Parsell	36,948	37.30	−3.55
Liberal National hold		Swing	+3.55	

=== Flynn ===
2019 Australian federal election: Flynn
Party	Candidate	Votes	%	±%
Liberal National	Ken O'Dowd	33,894	37.89	+0.83
Labor	Zac Beers	25,628	28.65	−4.74
One Nation	Sharon Lohse	17,531	19.60	+2.45
United Australia	Nathan Harris	3,798	4.25	+4.25
Greens	Jaiben Baker	2,744	3.07	+0.30
Conservative National	Marcus Hiesler	2,484	2.78	+2.78
Independent	Murray Peterson	1,994	2.23	+2.23
Independent	Duncan Scott	1,384	1.55	+0.56
Total formal votes		89,457	94.19	+0.38
Informal votes		5,517	5.81	−0.38
Turnout		94,974	92.15	−1.16
Two-party-preferred result
Liberal National	Ken O'Dowd	52,472	58.66	+7.62
Labor	Zac Beers	36,985	41.34	−7.62
Liberal National hold		Swing	+7.62	

=== Forde ===
2019 Australian federal election: Forde
Party	Candidate	Votes	%	±%
Liberal National	Bert van Manen	39,819	43.50	+2.87
Labor	Des Hardman	27,008	29.51	−8.13
One Nation	Ian Bowron	10,807	11.81	+11.81
Greens	Kirsty Petersen	7,987	8.73	+2.30
United Australia	Paul Creighton	3,696	4.04	+4.04
Conservative National	Les Innes	2,217	2.42	+2.42
Total formal votes		91,534	95.36	+0.43
Informal votes		4,449	4.64	−0.43
Turnout		95,983	89.49	+0.31
Two-party-preferred result
Liberal National	Bert van Manen	53,635	58.60	+7.97
Labor	Des Hardman	37,899	41.40	−7.97
Liberal National hold		Swing	+7.97	

=== Griffith ===
2019 Australian federal election: Griffith
Party	Candidate	Votes	%	±%
Liberal National	Olivia Roberts	40,816	40.97	−0.21
Labor	Terri Butler	30,836	30.95	−2.18
Greens	Max Chandler-Mather	23,562	23.65	+6.67
One Nation	Julie Darlington	2,109	2.12	+2.12
United Australia	Christian Julius	1,444	1.45	+1.45
Conservative National	Tony Murray	850	0.85	+0.85
Total formal votes		99,617	97.74	+1.81
Informal votes		2,302	2.26	−1.81
Turnout		101,919	91.05	+0.87
Two-party-preferred result
Labor	Terri Butler	52,659	52.86	+1.43
Liberal National	Olivia Roberts	46,958	47.14	−1.43
Labor hold		Swing	+1.43	

=== Groom ===
2019 Australian federal election: Groom
Party	Candidate	Votes	%	±%
Liberal National	John McVeigh	50,908	53.34	−0.66
Labor	Troy Kay	17,811	18.66	−3.54
One Nation	David King	12,493	13.09	+13.09
Greens	Alyce Nelligan	7,598	7.96	+1.80
United Australia	Kenneth Law	3,784	3.96	+3.96
Conservative National	Perry Adrelius	2,854	2.99	+2.99
Total formal votes		95,448	96.80	+0.37
Informal votes		3,160	3.20	−0.37
Turnout		98,608	93.05	−0.06
Two-party-preferred result
Liberal National	John McVeigh	67,274	70.48	+5.17
Labor	Troy Kay	28,174	29.52	−5.17
Liberal National hold		Swing	+5.17	

=== Herbert ===
2019 Australian federal election: Herbert
Party	Candidate	Votes	%	±%
Liberal National	Phillip Thompson	34,112	37.11	+1.61
Labor	Cathy O'Toole	23,393	25.45	−5.00
One Nation	Amy Lohse	10,189	11.09	−2.44
Katter's Australian	Nanette Radeck	9,007	9.80	+2.93
Greens	Sam Blackadder	6,721	7.31	+1.05
United Australia	Greg Dowling	5,239	5.70	+5.34
Conservative National	Tamara Durant	1,671	1.82	+1.82
Animal Justice	Mackenzie Severns	1,585	1.72	+1.72
Total formal votes		91,917	94.10	+0.98
Informal votes		5,759	5.90	−0.98
Turnout		97,676	90.06	−0.83
Two-party-preferred result
Liberal National	Phillip Thompson	53,641	58.36	+8.38
Labor	Cathy O'Toole	38,276	41.64	−8.38
Liberal National gain from Labor		Swing	+8.38	

=== Hinkler ===
2019 Australian federal election: Hinkler
Party	Candidate	Votes	%	±%
Liberal National	Keith Pitt	42,374	46.03	+2.24
Labor	Richard Pascoe	21,110	22.93	−3.76
One Nation	Damian Huxham	13,625	14.80	−4.36
United Australia	Joseph Ellul	4,029	4.38	+4.38
Greens	Anne Jackson	3,422	3.72	−0.23
Independent	Moe Turaga	2,583	2.81	+2.81
Conservative National	Aaron Erskine	1,471	1.60	+1.60
Animal Justice	Amy Byrnes	1,391	1.51	+1.51
Independent	David Norman	1,327	1.44	+1.44
Independent	Adrian Wone	735	0.80	+0.80
Total formal votes		92,067	92.18	−3.24
Informal votes		7,810	7.82	+3.24
Turnout		99,877	92.70	+0.50
Two-party-preferred result
Liberal National	Keith Pitt	59,384	64.50	+6.12
Labor	Richard Pascoe	32,683	35.50	−6.12
Liberal National hold		Swing	+6.12	

=== Kennedy ===
2019 Australian federal election: Kennedy
Party	Candidate	Votes	%	±%
Katter's Australian	Bob Katter	37,665	40.96	+2.59
Liberal National	Frank Beveridge	25,264	27.48	−5.11
Labor	Brett McGuire	15,612	16.98	−2.57
United Australia	Sue Bertuch	6,124	6.66	+6.66
Greens	Lyle Burness	4,751	5.17	+0.21
Conservative National	Ian Hackwell	2,532	2.75	+2.75
Total formal votes		91,948	95.84	−0.17
Informal votes		3,996	4.16	+0.17
Turnout		95,944	89.10	−0.46
Notional two-party-preferred count
Liberal National	Frank Beveridge	59,319	64.51	+7.77
Labor	Brett McGuire	32,629	35.49	−7.77
Two-candidate-preferred result
Katter's Australian	Bob Katter	58,231	63.33	+2.33
Liberal National	Frank Beveridge	33,717	36.67	−2.33
Katter's Australian hold		Swing	+2.33	

=== Leichhardt ===
2019 Australian federal election: Leichhardt
Party	Candidate	Votes	%	±%
Liberal National	Warren Entsch	33,753	37.59	−1.94
Labor	Elida Faith	25,846	28.79	+0.71
Greens	Gary Oliver	9,340	10.40	+1.62
Katter's Australian	Daniel McCarthy	7,318	8.15	+3.87
One Nation	Ross Macdonald	5,428	6.05	−1.48
United Australia	Jen Sackley	3,562	3.97	+3.97
Independent	Chad Anderson	2,562	2.85	+2.85
Conservative National	Jo Ashby	1,976	2.20	+2.20
Total formal votes		89,785	93.58	+0.88
Informal votes		6,160	6.42	−0.88
Turnout		95,945	87.65	−0.14
Two-party-preferred result
Liberal National	Warren Entsch	48,638	54.17	+0.22
Labor	Elida Faith	41,147	45.83	−0.22
Liberal National hold		Swing	+0.22	

=== Lilley ===
2019 Australian federal election: Lilley
Party	Candidate	Votes	%	±%
Liberal National	Brad Carswell	39,392	40.78	+2.08
Labor	Anika Wells	34,434	35.64	−8.12
Greens	John Meyer	13,539	14.01	+2.34
One Nation	Tracey Bell-Henselin	5,165	5.35	+5.35
United Australia	David McClaer	2,177	2.25	+2.25
Conservative National	Don Coles	1,155	1.20	+1.20
Socialist Alliance	Mike Crook	743	0.77	+0.77
Total formal votes		96,605	96.52	−0.55
Informal votes		3,480	3.48	+0.55
Turnout		100,085	92.15	−0.86
Two-party-preferred result
Labor	Anika Wells	48,917	50.64	−5.04
Liberal National	Brad Carswell	47,688	49.36	+5.04
Labor hold		Swing	−5.04	

=== Longman ===
2019 Australian federal election: Longman
Party	Candidate	Votes	%	±%
Liberal National	Terry Young	38,411	38.59	−0.42
Labor	Susan Lamb	33,949	34.10	−1.28
One Nation	Matthew Thomson	13,160	13.22	+3.80
Greens	Simone Dejun	6,684	6.71	+2.32
United Australia	Bailey Maher	3,344	3.36	+3.36
Conservative National	Dave Paulke	1,967	1.98	+1.98
Australia First	Peter Schuback	1,069	1.07	+1.07
Progressives	Jono Young	965	0.97	+0.97
Total formal votes		99,549	94.16	+2.69
Informal votes		6,173	5.84	−2.69
Turnout		105,722	92.16	+0.59
Two-party-preferred result
Liberal National	Terry Young	53,037	53.28	+4.07
Labor	Susan Lamb	46,512	46.72	−4.07
Liberal National gain from Labor		Swing	+4.07	

=== Maranoa ===
2019 Australian federal election: Maranoa
Party	Candidate	Votes	%	±%
Liberal National	David Littleproud	51,950	56.00	+6.81
Labor	Linda Little	14,427	15.55	−2.72
One Nation	Rosemary Moulden	13,564	14.62	−3.20
Katter's Australian	Anthony Wallis	4,245	4.58	−0.20
United Australia	Julie Saunders	3,367	3.63	+3.63
Greens	Emmeline Chidley	3,177	3.43	+0.03
Conservative National	Darren Christiansen	2,030	2.19	+2.19
Total formal votes		92,760	96.05	+1.58
Informal votes		3,813	3.95	−1.58
Turnout		96,573	91.93	−0.71
Notional two-party-preferred count
Liberal National	David Littleproud	69,961	75.42	+7.88
Labor	Linda Little	22,799	24.58	−7.88
Two-candidate-preferred result
Liberal National	David Littleproud	67,239	72.49	+6.63
One Nation	Rosemary Moulden	25,521	27.51	−6.63
Liberal National hold		Swing	+6.63	

=== McPherson ===
2019 Australian federal election: McPherson
Party	Candidate	Votes	%	±%
Liberal National	Karen Andrews	44,634	48.24	−5.05
Labor	Aaron Santelises	21,138	22.85	−3.15
Greens	Alan Quinn	10,167	10.99	+0.71
One Nation	John Spellman	5,421	5.86	+5.86
Liberal Democrats	Scott Crowe	3,222	3.48	+3.48
United Australia	Fiona Mackenzie	3,078	3.33	+3.33
Animal Justice	Renee Stewart	2,367	2.56	+2.56
Independent	Michael Kaff	1,648	1.78	+1.78
Conservative National	Sean Gaffy	846	0.91	+0.91
Total formal votes		92,521	93.67	−1.86
Informal votes		6,250	6.33	+1.86
Turnout		98,771	90.40	+0.91
Two-party-preferred result
Liberal National	Karen Andrews	57,545	62.20	+0.56
Labor	Aaron Santelises	34,976	37.80	−0.56
Liberal National hold		Swing	+0.56	

=== Moncrieff ===
2019 Australian federal election: Moncrieff
Party	Candidate	Votes	%	±%
Liberal National	Angie Bell	47,356	51.52	−6.84
Labor	Tracey Bell	19,822	21.56	−3.02
Greens	Sally Spain	8,900	9.68	−0.42
One Nation	Vanessa Sibson	5,920	6.44	+6.01
Animal Justice	Karla Freeman	3,551	3.86	+3.86
United Australia	Garry Eilola	3,419	3.72	+3.72
Liberal Democrats	S. Gryphon	1,799	1.96	+1.96
Conservative National	Darren Long	1,152	1.25	+1.25
Total formal votes		91,919	93.56	−1.94
Informal votes		6,327	6.44	+1.94
Turnout		98,246	88.20	+0.50
Two-party-preferred result
Liberal National	Angie Bell	60,079	65.36	+0.75
Labor	Tracey Bell	31,840	34.64	−0.75
Liberal National hold		Swing	+0.75	

=== Moreton ===
2019 Australian federal election: Moreton
Party	Candidate	Votes	%	±%
Liberal National	Angela Owen	37,011	40.83	+2.99
Labor	Graham Perrett	31,864	35.15	−1.60
Greens	Patsy O'Brien	15,189	16.76	+3.74
One Nation	William Lawrence	3,002	3.31	+3.31
United Australia	Jenny-Rebecca Brown	2,015	2.22	+2.22
Conservative National	Aaron Nieass	1,561	1.72	+1.72
Total formal votes		90,642	97.00	+1.11
Informal votes		2,799	3.00	−1.11
Turnout		93,441	90.92	−0.79
Two-party-preferred result
Labor	Graham Perrett	47,045	51.90	−2.12
Liberal National	Angela Owen	43,597	48.10	+2.12
Labor hold		Swing	−2.12	

=== Oxley ===
2019 Australian federal election: Oxley
Party	Candidate	Votes	%	±%
Labor	Milton Dick	38,501	42.53	−3.35
Liberal National	Russell Bauer	31,290	34.57	+2.41
Greens	Steven Purcell	10,535	11.64	+2.75
One Nation	Janet Lindbom	5,701	6.30	−1.93
United Australia	Ian Ferguson	2,368	2.62	+2.62
Conservative National	Scott Moerland	1,474	1.63	+1.63
Socialist Equality	Mike Head	654	0.72	+0.72
Total formal votes		90,523	95.25	−0.75
Informal votes		4,516	4.75	+0.75
Turnout		95,039	91.20	+0.34
Two-party-preferred result
Labor	Milton Dick	51,050	56.39	−2.62
Liberal National	Russell Bauer	39,473	43.61	+2.62
Labor hold		Swing	−2.62	

=== Petrie ===
2019 Australian federal election: Petrie
Party	Candidate	Votes	%	±%
Liberal National	Luke Howarth	48,879	48.11	+3.41
Labor	Corinne Mulholland	31,348	30.86	−7.52
Greens	Jason Kennedy	8,877	8.74	+1.37
One Nation	Nikhil Aai Reddy	7,638	7.52	+7.52
United Australia	Troy Hopkins	3,361	3.31	+3.31
Conservative National	Neville Fowler	1,494	1.47	+1.47
Total formal votes		101,597	96.38	+0.40
Informal votes		3,813	3.62	−0.40
Turnout		105,410	91.30	−0.32
Two-party-preferred result
Liberal National	Luke Howarth	59,331	58.40	+6.75
Labor	Corinne Mulholland	42,266	41.60	−6.75
Liberal National hold		Swing	+6.75	

=== Rankin ===
2019 Australian federal election: Rankin
Party	Candidate	Votes	%	±%
Labor	Jim Chalmers	35,156	41.43	−7.91
Liberal National	Clinton Pattison	26,608	31.35	+2.72
Greens	Neil Cotter	7,709	9.08	+2.79
One Nation	Jesse Schneider	7,261	8.56	+8.56
United Australia	Shyamal Reddy	3,134	3.69	+3.69
Liberal Democrats	Ric Davies	2,379	2.80	−1.31
Conservative National	Peter Andrews	1,593	1.88	+1.88
Not affiliated	Yusuf Mohammad	1,024	1.21	+1.21
Total formal votes		84,864	92.27	−1.97
Informal votes		7,111	7.73	+1.97
Turnout		91,975	88.82	−0.24
Two-party-preferred result
Labor	Jim Chalmers	47,893	56.44	−4.86
Liberal National	Clinton Pattison	36,971	43.56	+4.86
Labor hold		Swing	−4.86	

=== Ryan ===
2019 Australian federal election: Ryan
Party	Candidate	Votes	%	±%
Liberal National	Julian Simmonds	46,869	48.61	−3.51
Labor	Peter Cossar	23,560	24.43	+1.46
Greens	Jake Schoermer	19,621	20.35	+1.59
One Nation	Rodney Miles	2,080	2.16	+2.16
Animal Justice	Joanne Webb	1,854	1.92	+1.92
United Australia	Larry Crouch	1,478	1.53	+1.53
Conservative National	Andrew Banks	964	1.00	+1.00
Total formal votes		96,426	97.60	−0.04
Informal votes		2,369	2.40	+0.04
Turnout		98,795	92.98	−0.34
Two-party-preferred result
Liberal National	Julian Simmonds	54,023	56.03	−2.95
Labor	Peter Cossar	42,403	43.97	+2.95
Liberal National hold		Swing	−2.95	

=== Wide Bay ===
2019 Australian federal election: Wide Bay
Party	Candidate	Votes	%	±%
Liberal National	Llew O'Brien	44,204	47.09	+3.23
Labor	Jason Scanes	20,418	21.75	−0.81
One Nation	Aaron Vico	10,166	10.83	−4.73
Greens	Daniel Bryar	9,330	9.94	+1.74
Independent	Tim Jerome	4,220	4.50	+4.50
United Australia	Andrew Schebella	3,385	3.61	+3.61
Conservative National	Jasmine Smith	2,149	2.29	+2.29
Total formal votes		93,872	95.26	+0.26
Informal votes		4,667	4.74	−0.26
Turnout		98,539	91.67	−0.11
Two-party-preferred result
Liberal National	Llew O'Brien	59,279	63.15	+4.96
Labor	Jason Scanes	34,593	36.85	−4.96
Liberal National hold		Swing	+4.96	

=== Wright ===
2019 Australian federal election: Wright
Party	Candidate	Votes	%	±%
Liberal National	Scott Buchholz	43,522	44.92	+3.10
Labor	Pam McCreadie	18,155	18.74	−4.03
One Nation	Chris O'Callaghan	13,576	14.01	−6.89
Greens	Shannon Girard	6,951	7.17	−0.49
Independent	Innes Larkin	5,165	5.33	+5.33
United Australia	David Wright	4,747	4.90	+4.90
Katter's Australian	Matthew Tomlinson	2,613	2.70	+2.70
Conservative National	Rod Smith	2,164	2.23	+2.23
Total formal votes		96,893	93.92	−1.77
Informal votes		6,269	6.08	+1.77
Turnout		103,162	92.01	−0.23
Two-party-preferred result
Liberal National	Scott Buchholz	62,571	64.58	+4.96
Labor	Pam McCreadie	34,322	35.42	−4.96
Liberal National hold		Swing	+4.96	
