= Electoral results for the Division of Dickson =

Australian division election results

This is a list of electoral results for the Division of Dickson in Australian federal elections from the division's creation in 1993 until the present.

== Members ==
| Member | Party | Term |
|---|---|---|
| Michael Lavarch | Labor | 1993–1996 |
| Tony Smith | Liberal | 1996–1998 |
| Tony Smith | Independent | 1998 |
| Cheryl Kernot | Labor | 1998–2001 |
| Peter Dutton | Liberal | 2001–2010 |
| Peter Dutton | Liberal National | 2010–2025 |
| Ali France | Labor | 2025–present |

== Election results ==
=== Elections in the 2020s ===
==== 2025 ====
2025 Australian federal election: Dickson
| Party | Candidate | Votes | % | ±% |
|---|---|---|---|---|
| Liberal National | Peter Dutton | 29,399 | 34.57 | −7.50 |
| Labor | Ali France | 29,107 | 34.22 | +2.52 |
| Independent | Ellie Smith | 10,853 | 12.76 | +12.76 |
| Greens | Vinnie Batten | 6,173 | 7.26 | −5.74 |
| One Nation | Joel Stevenson | 3,280 | 3.86 | −1.50 |
| Legalise Cannabis | David Zaloudek | 2,297 | 2.70 | +2.70 |
| Family First | Suniti Hewett | 1,829 | 2.15 | +2.15 |
| Trumpet of Patriots | Michael Jessop | 1,435 | 1.69 | +1.69 |
| Animal Justice | Maureen Brohman | 680 | 0.80 | +0.80 |
| Total formal votes | | 85,053 | 96.23 | +0.11 |
| Informal votes | | 3,329 | 3.77 | −0.11 |
| Turnout | | 88,382 | 74.02 | −17.33 |
Two-party-preferred result
| Labor | Ali France | 46,966 | 56.52 | +8.22 |
| Liberal National | Peter Dutton | 36,131 | 43.48 | −8.22 |
| Labor gain from Liberal National | | Swing | +8.22 | |

Results are not final. Last updated on 4 May 2025 at 7:32 PM AEST.

==== 2022 ====
2022 Australian federal election: Dickson
| Party | Candidate | Votes | % | ±% |
|---|---|---|---|---|
| Liberal National | Peter Dutton | 41,657 | 42.07 | −3.86 |
| Labor | Ali France | 31,396 | 31.70 | +0.37 |
| Greens | Vinnie Batten | 12,871 | 13.00 | +3.02 |
| One Nation | Tamera Gibson | 5,312 | 5.36 | +0.18 |
| United Australia | Alina Ward | 2,717 | 2.74 | +0.50 |
| Independent | Alan Buchbach | 2,222 | 2.24 | +2.24 |
| Independent | Thor Prohaska | 1,618 | 1.63 | −0.74 |
| Liberal Democrats | Lloyd Russell | 1,236 | 1.25 | +1.25 |
| Total formal votes | | 99,029 | 96.12 | +0.48 |
| Informal votes | | 3,996 | 3.88 | −0.48 |
| Turnout | | 103,025 | 91.35 | −2.32 |
Two-party-preferred result
| Liberal National | Peter Dutton | 51,196 | 51.70 | −2.94 |
| Labor | Ali France | 47,833 | 48.30 | +2.94 |
| Liberal National hold | | Swing | −2.94 | |

Alluvial diagram for preference flows in the seat of Dickson in the 2022 federal election. indicates at what stage the winning candidate had over 50% of the votes and was declared the winner.

=== Elections in the 2010s ===
==== 2019 ====
2019 Australian federal election: Dickson
| Party | Candidate | Votes | % | ±% |
|---|---|---|---|---|
| Liberal National | Peter Dutton | 44,528 | 45.93 | +1.23 |
| Labor | Ali France | 30,370 | 31.33 | −3.66 |
| Greens | Benedict Coyne | 9,675 | 9.98 | +0.13 |
| One Nation | Carrol Halliwell | 5,022 | 5.18 | +5.18 |
| Independent | Thor Prohaska | 2,302 | 2.37 | −1.04 |
| United Australia | Steve Austin | 2,176 | 2.24 | +2.24 |
| Animal Justice | Maureen Brohman | 1,831 | 1.89 | +1.89 |
| Conservative National | Richelle Simpson | 1,044 | 1.08 | +1.08 |
| Total formal votes | | 96,948 | 95.64 | −1.02 |
| Informal votes | | 4,416 | 4.36 | +1.02 |
| Turnout | | 101,364 | 93.67 | −0.18 |
Two-party-preferred result
| Liberal National | Peter Dutton | 52,968 | 54.64 | +2.95 |
| Labor | Ali France | 43,980 | 45.36 | −2.95 |
| Liberal National hold | | Swing | +2.95 | |

==== 2016 ====
2016 Australian federal election: Dickson
| Party | Candidate | Votes | % | ±% |
|---|---|---|---|---|
| Liberal National | Peter Dutton | 40,519 | 44.56 | −3.45 |
| Labor | Linda Lavarch | 31,769 | 34.94 | +3.62 |
| Greens | Michael Berkman | 8,971 | 9.87 | +3.45 |
| Family First | Ray Hutchinson | 3,868 | 4.25 | +2.45 |
| Independent | Thor Prohaska | 3,217 | 3.54 | +3.54 |
| Liberal Democrats | Doug Nicholson | 2,589 | 2.85 | +2.85 |
| Total formal votes | | 90,933 | 96.63 | +0.89 |
| Informal votes | | 3,172 | 3.37 | −0.89 |
| Turnout | | 94,105 | 93.47 | −1.42 |
Two-party-preferred result
| Liberal National | Peter Dutton | 46,922 | 51.60 | −5.12 |
| Labor | Linda Lavarch | 44,011 | 48.40 | +5.12 |
| Liberal National hold | | Swing | −5.12 | |

==== 2013 ====
2013 Australian federal election: Dickson
| Party | Candidate | Votes | % | ±% |
|---|---|---|---|---|
| Liberal National | Peter Dutton | 41,163 | 48.01 | −0.95 |
| Labor | Michael Gilliver | 26,848 | 31.32 | −2.15 |
| Palmer United | Mark Taverner | 8,390 | 9.79 | +9.79 |
| Greens | Tyrone D'Lisle | 5,507 | 6.42 | −4.49 |
| Katter's Australian | Jim Cornwell | 1,697 | 1.98 | +1.98 |
| Family First | Michael McDowell | 1,542 | 1.80 | −1.07 |
| Rise Up Australia | Geoffrey Taylor | 585 | 0.68 | +0.68 |
| Total formal votes | | 85,732 | 95.74 | +0.15 |
| Informal votes | | 3,819 | 4.26 | −0.15 |
| Turnout | | 89,551 | 94.89 | +0.35 |
Two-party-preferred result
| Liberal National | Peter Dutton | 48,631 | 56.72 | +1.59 |
| Labor | Michael Gilliver | 37,101 | 43.28 | −1.59 |
| Liberal National hold | | Swing | +1.59 | |

==== 2010 ====
2010 Australian federal election: Dickson
| Party | Candidate | Votes | % | ±% |
|---|---|---|---|---|
| Liberal National | Peter Dutton | 39,880 | 48.96 | +3.62 |
| Labor | Fiona McNamara | 27,264 | 33.47 | −10.95 |
| Greens | David Colbert | 8,888 | 10.91 | +4.84 |
| Independent | Rebecca Jenkinson | 2,558 | 3.14 | +3.14 |
| Family First | Alan Revie | 2,340 | 2.87 | +0.35 |
| Liberal Democrats | Bob Hunter | 521 | 0.64 | +0.34 |
| Total formal votes | | 81,451 | 95.59 | −1.62 |
| Informal votes | | 3,755 | 4.41 | +1.62 |
| Turnout | | 85,206 | 94.56 | −0.81 |
Two-party-preferred result
| Liberal National | Peter Dutton | 44,902 | 55.13 | +5.89 |
| Labor | Fiona McNamara | 36,549 | 44.87 | −5.89 |
| Liberal National notional gain from Labor | | Swing | +5.89 | |

=== Elections in the 2000s ===
==== 2007 ====
2007 Australian federal election: Dickson
| Party | Candidate | Votes | % | ±% |
|---|---|---|---|---|
| Liberal | Peter Dutton | 38,507 | 46.15 | −6.65 |
| Labor | Fiona McNamara | 36,438 | 43.67 | +9.54 |
| Greens | Howard Nielsen | 5,006 | 6.00 | +0.38 |
| Family First | Dale Shuttleworth | 2,118 | 2.54 | −1.75 |
| Democrats | Peter Kerin | 797 | 0.96 | −0.64 |
| Christian Democrats | Connie Wood | 323 | 0.39 | +0.39 |
| Liberty & Democracy | Brad Cornwell | 258 | 0.31 | +0.31 |
| Total formal votes | | 83,447 | 97.23 | +1.64 |
| Informal votes | | 2,380 | 2.77 | −1.64 |
| Turnout | | 85,827 | 96.05 | +0.10 |
Two-party-preferred result
| Liberal | Peter Dutton | 41,832 | 50.13 | −8.76 |
| Labor | Fiona McNamara | 41,615 | 49.87 | +8.76 |
| Liberal hold | | Swing | −8.76 | |

==== 2004 ====
2004 Australian federal election: Dickson
| Party | Candidate | Votes | % | ±% |
|---|---|---|---|---|
| Liberal | Peter Dutton | 39,810 | 52.09 | +6.55 |
| Labor | Craig McConnell | 27,036 | 35.37 | +2.18 |
| Greens | Howard Robert Nielsen | 4,485 | 5.87 | +2.35 |
| Family First | Dale Shuttleworth | 3,454 | 4.52 | +4.52 |
| Democrats | Kirsty Reye | 1,270 | 1.66 | −3.64 |
| Great Australians | Terry Hyland | 373 | 0.49 | +0.49 |
| Total formal votes | | 76,428 | 95.40 | +1.12 |
| Informal votes | | 3,684 | 4.60 | −1.12 |
| Turnout | | 80,112 | 95.14 | +0.92 |
Two-party-preferred result
| Liberal | Peter Dutton | 44,199 | 57.83 | +1.81 |
| Labor | Craig McConnell | 32,229 | 42.17 | −1.81 |
| Liberal hold | | Swing | +1.81 | |

==== 2001 ====
2001 Australian federal election: Dickson
| Party | Candidate | Votes | % | ±% |
|---|---|---|---|---|
| Liberal | Peter Dutton | 36,390 | 45.58 | +10.79 |
| Labor | Cheryl Kernot | 26,557 | 33.26 | −7.34 |
| Independent | Colin Kessels | 5,203 | 6.52 | +6.52 |
| Democrats | Shayne Turner | 4,296 | 5.38 | +1.30 |
| Greens | Paul Kramer | 2,812 | 3.52 | +1.44 |
| One Nation | Wayne Whitney | 2,575 | 3.23 | −5.29 |
| Independent | Terry Hyland | 1,220 | 1.53 | +1.53 |
| Outdoor Recreation | Gary Kimlin | 485 | 0.61 | +0.61 |
| Independent | J. F. Barnes | 305 | 0.38 | +0.38 |
| Total formal votes | | 79,843 | 94.38 | −2.12 |
| Informal votes | | 4,755 | 5.62 | +2.12 |
| Turnout | | 84,598 | 96.51 | |
Two-party-preferred result
| Liberal | Peter Dutton | 44,688 | 55.97 | +6.09 |
| Labor | Cheryl Kernot | 35,155 | 44.03 | −6.09 |
| Liberal gain from Labor | | Swing | +6.09 | |

=== Elections in the 1990s ===
==== 1998 ====
1998 Australian federal election: Dickson
| Party | Candidate | Votes | % | ±% |
|---|---|---|---|---|
| Labor | Cheryl Kernot | 29,899 | 40.60 | +1.26 |
| Liberal | Rod Henshaw | 25,622 | 34.79 | −6.99 |
| Independent | Tony Smith | 6,595 | 8.96 | +8.96 |
| One Nation | Bruce Camfield | 6,271 | 8.52 | +8.52 |
| Democrats | Lis Manktelow | 3,008 | 4.08 | −1.96 |
| Greens | Kim Pantano | 1,536 | 2.09 | −0.96 |
| Independent | Mark Kelly | 264 | 0.36 | +0.36 |
| Independent | Robert Halliday | 227 | 0.31 | +0.31 |
| Family Law Reform | Eddie Dunne | 224 | 0.30 | +0.30 |
| Total formal votes | | 73,646 | 96.50 | −1.08 |
| Informal votes | | 2,672 | 3.50 | +1.08 |
| Turnout | | 76,318 | 95.69 | −0.33 |
Two-party-preferred result
| Labor | Cheryl Kernot | 36,911 | 50.12 | +4.02 |
| Liberal | Rod Henshaw | 36,735 | 49.88 | −4.02 |
| Labor gain from Independent | | Swing | +4.02 | |

==== 1996 ====
1996 Australian federal election: Dickson
| Party | Candidate | Votes | % | ±% |
|---|---|---|---|---|
| Liberal | Tony Smith | 32,418 | 42.02 | +6.23 |
| Labor | Michael Lavarch | 30,800 | 39.92 | −5.94 |
| Democrats | Tom Spencer | 4,653 | 6.03 | +2.59 |
| National | John Saunders | 4,615 | 5.98 | −0.06 |
| Greens | Kim Pantano | 2,240 | 2.90 | −1.46 |
| Independent | Rona Joyner | 1,154 | 1.50 | +1.50 |
| Indigenous Peoples | Geoffrey Atkinson | 470 | 0.61 | +0.61 |
| Independent | Theoron Toon | 462 | 0.60 | +0.60 |
| Natural Law | Geoff Wilson | 190 | 0.25 | +0.16 |
| Republican | Peter Consandine | 156 | 0.20 | +0.20 |
| Total formal votes | | 77,158 | 97.57 | −0.30 |
| Informal votes | | 1,921 | 2.43 | +0.30 |
| Turnout | | 79,079 | 96.02 | +5.81 |
Two-party-preferred result
| Liberal | Tony Smith | 40,933 | 53.17 | +5.72 |
| Labor | Michael Lavarch | 36,051 | 46.83 | −5.72 |
| Liberal gain from Labor | | Swing | +5.72 | |

==== 1993 supplementary election ====
1993 Dickson supplementary election
| Party | Candidate | Votes | % | ±% |
|---|---|---|---|---|
| Labor | Michael Lavarch | 29,515 | 43.56 | +1.08 |
| Liberal | Bruce Flegg | 22,738 | 33.56 | +3.31 |
| National | Trevor St Baker | 6,921 | 10.21 | −1.47 |
| Greens | Desiree Mahoney | 3,746 | 5.53 | +5.53 |
| Confederate Action | Mal Beard | 1,883 | 2.78 | +2.78 |
| Democrats | Glen Spicer | 1,508 | 2.23 | −13.26 |
| Independent | Michael Darby | 939 | 1.39 | +1.39 |
| Independent | Alan Bawden | 333 | 0.49 | +0.49 |
| | Leonard Matthews | 174 | 0.26 | +0.26 |
| Total formal votes | | 67,757 | 98.03 | −0.02 |
| Informal votes | | 1,360 | 1.97 | +0.02 |
| Turnout | | 69,117 | 90.21 | |
Two-party-preferred result
| Labor | Michael Lavarch | 34,033 | 50.26 | −2.53 |
| Liberal | Bruce Flegg | 33,686 | 49.74 | +2.53 |
| Labor notional hold | | Swing | −2.53 | |
