= Peter Dutton =

Australian politician (born 1970)

The Honourable Peter Dutton
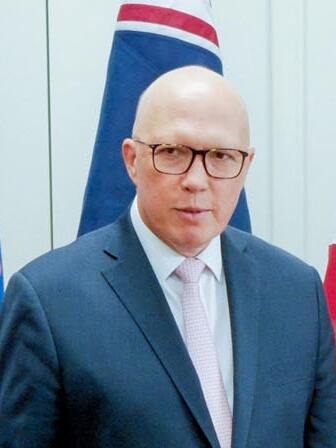
- Dutton in 2024

Leader of the Opposition
- In office 30 May 2022 – 3 May 2025
- Prime Minister: Anthony Albanese
- Deputy: Sussan Ley
- Preceded by: Anthony Albanese
- Succeeded by: Sussan Ley

15th Leader of the Liberal Party
- In office 30 May 2022 – 5 May 2025
- Deputy: Sussan Ley
- Preceded by: Scott Morrison
- Succeeded by: Sussan Ley
Ministerial offices held
Minister for Defence
In office 30 March 2021 – 23 May 2022
Prime Minister	Scott Morrison
Deputy	Andrew Hastie
Preceded by	Linda Reynolds
Succeeded by	Richard Marles
Leader of the House
In office 30 March 2021 – 23 May 2022
Prime Minister	Scott Morrison
Preceded by	Christian Porter
Succeeded by	Tony Burke
Minister for Home Affairs
In office 20 December 2017 – 30 March 2021
Prime Minister	Malcolm Turnbull; Scott Morrison
Succeeded by	Karen Andrews
Minister for Immigration and Border Protection
In office 23 December 2014 – 21 August 2018
Prime Minister	Tony Abbott; Malcolm Turnbull
Preceded by	Scott Morrison
Succeeded by	David Coleman
Minister for Health
In office 18 September 2013 – 23 December 2014
Prime Minister	Tony Abbott
Preceded by	Tanya Plibersek
Succeeded by	Sussan Ley
Minister for Sport
In office 18 September 2013 – 23 December 2014
Prime Minister	Tony Abbott
Preceded by	Don Farrell
Succeeded by	Sussan Ley
Minister for Revenue and Assistant Treasurer
In office 27 January 2006 – 3 December 2007
Prime Minister	John Howard
Preceded by	Mal Brough
Succeeded by	Chris Bowen
Minister for Workforce Participation
In office 26 October 2004 – 27 January 2006
Prime Minister	John Howard
Preceded by	Fran Bailey
Succeeded by	Sharman Stone

Member of the Australian Parliament for Dickson
- In office 10 November 2001 – 3 May 2025
- Preceded by: Cheryl Kernot
- Succeeded by: Ali France

Personal details
- Born: Peter Craig Dutton; 18 November 1970 (age 56) Brisbane, Queensland, Australia
- Party: Liberal (LNP)
- Other political affiliations: Coalition
- Spouse: Kirilly Brumby (m. 2003)
- Children: 3
- Education: Queensland University of Technology (BBus)
- Website: peterdutton.com.au
- Police career
- Department: Queensland Police
- Branch: National Crime Authority, Drug Squad, Sex Offenders Squad
- Service years: 1990–1999
- Rank: Detective Senior Constable (Note: This was the highest rank Dutton achieved prior to leaving the Queensland Police.)

Peter Craig Dutton (born 18 November 1970) is an Australian former politician who served as the leader of the Opposition and the leader of the Liberal Party from 2022 to 2025. He was the member of Parliament (MP) for the Queensland division of Dickson from 2001 to 2025. Dutton previously held various ministerial positions in the Howard, Abbott, Turnbull, and Morrison governments.

Dutton grew up in Brisbane. He worked as a police officer in the Queensland Police for nearly a decade upon leaving school, and later ran a construction business with his father. He joined the Liberal Party as a teenager and was elected to the House of Representatives at the 2001 election, at the age of 30. Following the 2004 election, he was appointed as Minister for Employment Participation. In January 2006, Dutton was promoted to Assistant Treasurer under Peter Costello. After the defeat of the Liberal-National Coalition at the 2007 election, he was appointed to the Shadow Cabinet as Shadow Minister for Health, a role he held for the next six years.

Upon the victory of the Coalition at the 2013 election, Dutton was appointed Minister for Health and Minister for Sport. He was moved to the role of Minister for Immigration and Border Protection in December 2014, where he played a key role in overseeing Operation Sovereign Borders. He was kept in that position after Malcolm Turnbull replaced Tony Abbott as Prime Minister in September 2015. In December 2017, he was also given the new role of Minister for Home Affairs, heading a new "super" department with broad responsibilities brought together from other existing departments.

After the defeat of Abbott, Dutton became widely seen as the leader of the conservative faction in the Liberal Party, and began to be spoken of as a potential leader. In August 2018, after a period of poor opinion polling for the Coalition, Dutton unsuccessfully challenged Turnbull for the leadership. He then was defeated by Scott Morrison in a second leadership ballot days later after Turnbull chose to resign. He was retained as Minister for Home Affairs by Morrison, later becoming Minister for Defence and Leader of the House in March 2021. Dutton went on to succeed Morrison as party leader unopposed after the Coalition's defeat at the 2022 election, becoming leader of the opposition. He was the first Liberal leader to come from Queensland, and the first leader since Alexander Downer to represent a seat outside New South Wales. Dutton led the Coalition to a landslide defeat at the 2025 Australian federal election, reducing the Coalition's 58 seats in 2022 to 43 of 150. Dutton himself lost his own seat of Dickson to Labor candidate Ali France, becoming the first federal Opposition Leader to be voted out by an election. He is also the second incumbent Liberal leader to be voted out by an election after John Howard. In April 2026 Peter Dutton was appointed to the board of the Queensland Investment Corporation (QIC).

== Early life and education ==
Peter Craig Dutton was born on 18 November 1970 in Boondall, Queensland, a northern suburb of Brisbane, to Bruce Dutton and Ailsa Leitch. Dutton is the great-great-grandson of the pastoralist squatter and politician Charles Boydell Dutton. He is also a descendant of Captain Richard James Coley, who was Queensland's first Sergeant-at-Arms, who built Brisbane's first private dwelling and who gave evidence confirming the mass poisonings of Aboriginal Australians at Kilcoy in 1842.

He is the eldest of five children. His father worked as a builder, and his mother worked in childcare. Dutton finished high school at the Anglican St Paul's School, Bald Hills. He worked cash in hand at a butcher shop during his school years, and his parents separated shortly after he graduated.

Dutton joined the Young Liberals in 1988 aged 18. He became the policy vice-chair of the Bayside Young Liberals the following year and chair of the branch in 1990. At the 1989 Queensland state election, the 19-year-old Dutton ran unsuccessfully as the Liberal candidate against Tom Burns, a former state Labor leader, in the safe Labor seat of Lytton.

According to a leaked transcript of his academic record, in 1989 Dutton failed four of six subjects in his first year of a Bachelor of Business degree at Queensland University of Technology. This prompted him to join the police force and study business part time, graduating a decade later.

== Career prior to politics ==
=== Police career ===
Dutton graduated from the Queensland Police Academy in 1990. He was a Queensland Police officer for nearly a decade, working in the drug squad in Brisbane in the early 1990s. He also worked in the sex offenders squad and with the National Crime Authority. In 1999, Dutton left the Queensland Police, having reached the rank of detective senior constable. Documentation filed in the District Court of Queensland in 2000 describes his resignation as being prompted by a loss of driving confidence after a car crash in August 1998. During a covert surveillance operation, he rolled his unmarked Mazda 626 car while in pursuit of an escaped prisoner who was driving erratically. Dutton suffered numerous injuries in the accident, and was hospitalised briefly and bedridden for a week. He sought damages of A$250,000, equivalent to A$472,006 in 2022, from the escaped prisoner's insurance company but dropped the claim in 2005.

=== Business activities ===
On leaving the police, he and his father founded the business Dutton Holdings, which was registered in 2000; it operated under six different trading and business names. The company bought, renovated, and converted buildings into childcare centres. In 2002 it sold three childcare centres to the now defunct ABC Learning, which continued to pay annual rent of A$100,000, equivalent to A$165,647 in 2022, to Dutton Holdings. Dutton Holdings continued to trade under the name Dutton Building & Development.

== Howard government (2001–2007) ==
=== Backbencher, 2001–2004 ===
In early 2001, Dutton won Liberal preselection for the seat of Dickson in Brisbane's northern suburbs, reportedly with the support of Liberal powerbroker Santo Santoro. He was elected to the House of Representatives at the 2001 election, aged 30. He defeated the high-profile incumbent Australian Labor Party (ALP) MP Cheryl Kernot, a shadow cabinet minister and former leader of the Australian Democrats, with Dickson regarded as a key target seat for the Coalition.

Dutton's first overseas trip as an MP was a visit to the site of the September 11 attacks in New York City. In his maiden speech in February 2002 he stated that the "silent majority" and "forgotten people" were dissatisfied with "the boisterous minority and the politically correct" and "the dictatorship of the trade union movement". He was also critical of members of the Queensland Council for Civil Liberties, who he said were "obsessed with the rights of criminals yet do not utter a word of understanding or compassion for the victims of crime".

Dutton had a relatively high profile as a first-term backbencher. He was appointed to the House Standing Committee on Family and Community Affairs in 2002 and served on an inquiry into family law and the Child Support Agency, where he advocated for lawyers to have less of a role in determining parental custody. The inquiry's report was publicly criticised by Alastair Nicholson, the chief justice of the Family Court of Australia, who said its proposals were "impractical and naive".

Dutton also spoke frequently on crime topics, including supporting the death penalty for the perpetrators of the 2002 Bali bombings and supporting legislation that would allow businesses to refuse service to drug addicts. In 2004, following the High Court decision in R v Carroll, he accompanied Faye Kennedy, the mother of murdered infant Deidre Kennedy, on a statewide tour to promote "Deirdre's Law", which sought to amend the double jeopardy provisions of Queensland's criminal code.

=== Minister, 2004–2007 ===
On 26 October 2004, Dutton was appointed Minister for Workforce Participation in the Howard government, following the Coalition's re-election at the 2004 election. He was seen as politically close to Prime Minister John Howard. In July 2005, he was one of the few government ministers to support Howard's suggestion that a national identity card be introduced as an anti-terrorism measure, with a number of cabinet ministers publicly opposing the idea.

Dutton was responsible for the government's suite of "welfare-to-work" policies, which were intended to break generational poverty and welfare dependency. In November 2004, he flagged that the government would be looking at measures to encourage disability support pensioners to enter the workforce. The following year he announced that disability support pensioners deemed capable of working more than 15 hours per week would be moved to the Newstart Allowance. Changes were also made to rules for single parents, with recipients required to prove that they were not in a de facto relationship or face a reduced payment. In April 2005, Dutton announced that single parents would be required to seek employment once their youngest children entered school or receive a decrease in welfare payments. He stated that the changes were necessary to "ensure welfare dependency is not entrenched".

Following a ministerial reshuffle, Dutton was appointed Assistant Treasurer and Minister for Revenue on 27 January 2006. He had previously worked closely with Treasurer Peter Costello on the welfare reforms, and was reportedly a "strident proponent" of WorkChoices, the government's industrial relations reform package. He successfully retained Dickson at the 2007 election, which saw the government lose office; however, his margin was reduced to 217 votes more than Labor's Fiona McNamara.

== Opposition (2007–2013) ==
Following the 2007 election, Dutton was promoted to shadow cabinet by the new Liberal leader Brendan Nelson, as Shadow Minister for Finance, Competition Policy and Deregulation. In 2008, he chose not to be present in the chamber during the apology to the Stolen Generations, which enjoyed bipartisan support. He said "I regarded it as something which was not going to deliver tangible outcomes to kids who are being raped and tortured in communities in the 21st century." Later, in a 2014 interview with the Sydney Morning Herald, Dutton said he regretted boycotting the apology: "I underestimated the symbolic and cultural significance of it." In 2023 Dutton apologised for skipping the apology, saying he had "failed to grasp" its significance.

In September 2008, Nelson was replaced as Liberal leader by Malcolm Turnbull, who appointed Dutton as Shadow Minister for Health and Ageing. He retained that position when Tony Abbott succeeded Turnbull as leader in December 2009. In June 2010, Dutton released the Coalition's mental health policy. The Australian described it as "the most significant announcement by any political party in relation to a targeted, evidence-based investment in mental health", but not all experts agreed.

Dutton retained his seat with a positive swing at the 2010 election, despite an unfavourable redistribution. In the lead-up to the 2013 election, he announced a range of Coalition health policies, which were received favourably by industry groups. The Australian Medical Association said "the Coalition has delivered a strong package of practical, affordable health policies that would strengthen general practice", while Cancer Council Australia said that "Dutton's promise to finalise the bowel cancer screening program by 2020 would save an additional 35,000 lives over the next 40 years".

=== Attempted seat shift ===
As the 2010 election approached, there was a risk that Dutton would lose to the Labor candidate due to a redistribution of division boundaries that had erased his majority and made Dickson notionally Labor. As a result, Dutton sought pre-selection for the merged Liberal National Party in the safe Liberal seat of McPherson on the Gold Coast (despite not living in or near McPherson). Some constituents criticized the decision, and according to a Dickson LNP member, "the abandoning of a seat by a sitting MP halfway through a parliamentary term to contest pre-selection in a seat over 100 kilometres to the south is not looked upon favourably by those constituents abandoned in the first place".

Dutton lost the McPherson pre-selection to Karen Andrews, reportedly due to misgivings from former Nationals in the area. He then asked the LNP for a seat with an uncontested pre-selection, which Liberal MP Alex Somlyay (the chief Opposition whip of the time) said was "unusual". When the state executive did not provide Dutton an uncontested pre-selection, Dutton returned to campaign for the seat of Dickson. In the election, he won the seat with a 5.9% swing towards him.

== Cabinet minister (2013–2022) ==
=== Minister for Health ===
Dutton retained his seat at the 2013 election. He was appointed to the new ministry by Prime Minister Tony Abbott as Minister for Health and Minister for Sport. As Health Minister, Dutton announced the $20 billion Medical Research Future Fund.

Under Dutton, projected funding in the health portfolio increased in the 2014–15 Budget to $66.9 billion, an increase of 7.5 percent from $62.2 billion in 2012–13, the final full year of the Labor government. Projected expenditure on Medicare increased over 9.5 percent from $18.5 billion in 2012–13 under Labor to a projected $20.32 billion in 2014–15 under Dutton. Funding for public hospital services increased by nearly 14 percent under Dutton in the 2014–15 Budget to a projected $15.12 billion compared to $13.28 billion in the last full year of the Labor government in 2012–13. In a 2015 poll by Australian Doctor magazine, based on votes from over 1,100 doctors, Dutton was voted the worst health minister in the last 35 years by 46 percent of respondents.

=== Minister for Immigration (2014–2017) ===
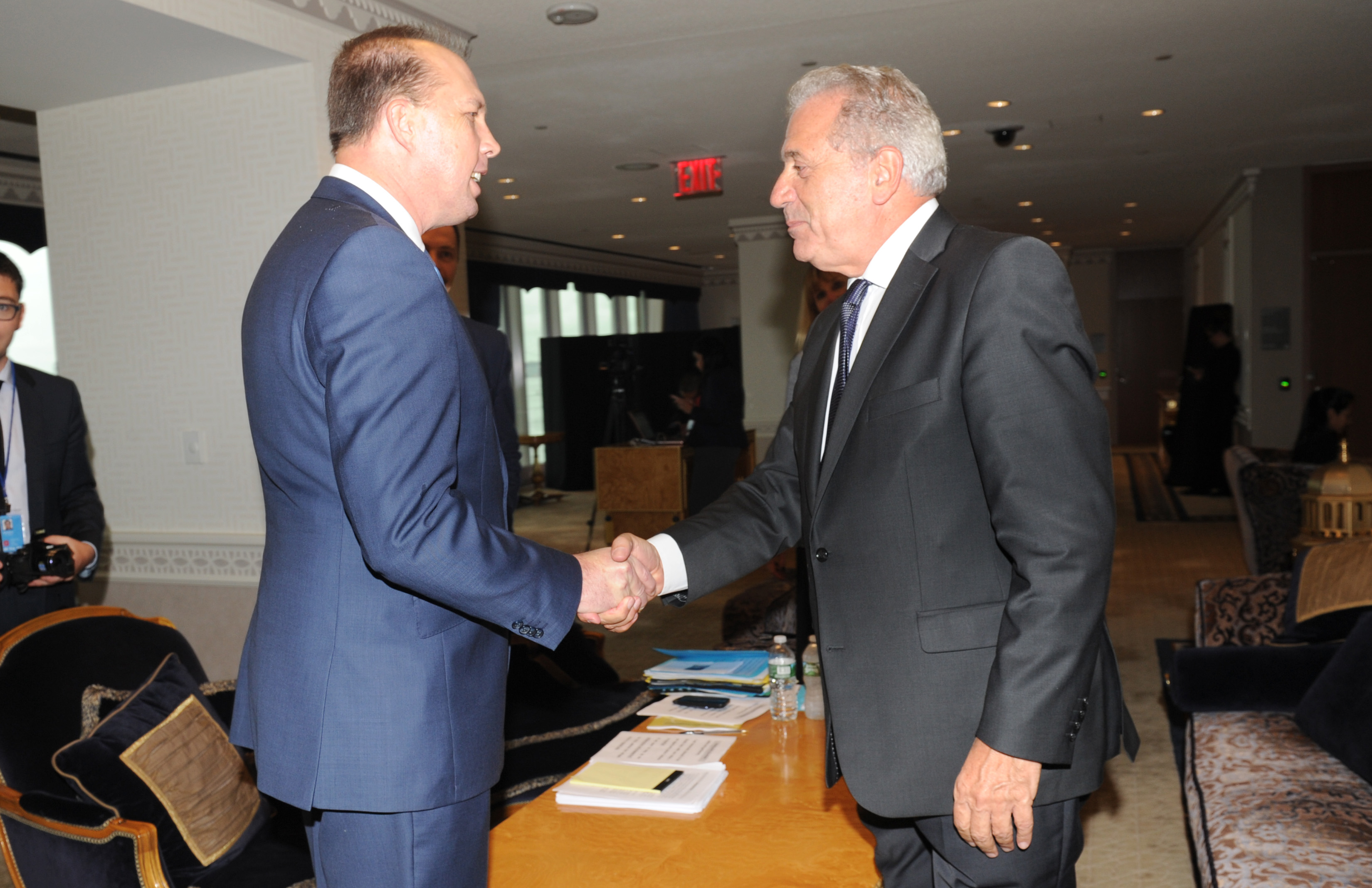
Dutton (left) meeting with EU Migration Commissioner Dimitris Avramopoulos in 2016

On 23 December 2014, Dutton was sworn in as the Minister for Immigration and Border Protection after a cabinet reshuffle. In September 2015, Dutton cancelled the visa of anti-abortion activist Troy Newman, over remarks in his 2000 book Their Blood Cries Out. In 2016, News Corp Sunday political editor Samantha Maiden wrote a column critical of Jamie Briggs. Dutton drafted a text message to Briggs describing Maiden as a "mad fucking witch" but inadvertently sent it to Maiden. Maiden accepted an apology from Dutton.

==== Sarah Hanson-Young spying incident ====
On 5 June 2015, Dutton denied claims made by Greens Senator Sarah Hanson-Young that she was spied on during a visit to Nauru. He called into question Hanson-Young's credibility, saying "I have evidence that Senator Hanson-Young over-states every issue. She gets her facts wrong most of the time. And I just think you need to look at it in the light of experience with Senator Hanson-Young. If she's got evidence, produce it." He also said that "What Sarah Hanson-Young is about is publicity. She loves the camera and she loves to see her own name in the paper. That's the start and finish of Sarah Hanson-Young." Hanson-Young responded that "Peter Dutton can attack and insult me as much as he likes, but nothing will change the fact that my work has revealed systemic child abuse and the rape of young women on Nauru under his watch." The spying claims were later confirmed by the Immigration Department and Wilson Security who carried out the spying operation.

==== Au pair cases ====
In June 2015, an au pair who was detained at Brisbane Airport made a phone call and had her tourist visa reinstated. In November, in a second case, Dutton granted a visa to another au pair, despite his department warning him that she was at risk of breaching her work conditions on her tourist visa. Dutton indicated that he knew neither tourist. In August 2018, Roman Quaedvlieg indicated that he had personal knowledge of one of the cases, and was seeking to correct Hansard if it did not match his knowledge. A third au pair was granted a visa due to lobbying by AFL chief Gillon McLachlan; she was due to stay with his relative Callum Maclachlan. Dutton's department again warned him there were indications that she was intending to work for Callum's family. A Senate inquiry into two of the cases published a report on 11 September 2018. It recommended "that the Senate consider censuring the Minister for Home Affairs (the Hon Peter Dutton MP) ... for failing to observe fairness in making official decisions as required by the Statement of Ministerial Standards."

==== Rising seas joke ====
On 11 September 2015, Dutton was overheard on an open microphone, before a community meeting on Syrian refugees, joking about rising sea levels in the Pacific Islands, saying: "Time doesn't mean anything when you're about to have water lapping at your door". Dutton apologised, after initially refusing to, as the statement was made in a private conversation. The Foreign Minister of the Marshall Islands, Tony deBrum, responded by writing: "insensitivity knows no bounds in the big polluting island down [south]" and the "Next time waves are battering my home [and] my grandkids are scared, I'll ask Peter Dutton to come over, and we'll see if he is still laughing".

==== Manus Island ====
On 15 April 2017, shots were fired by the Papua New Guinea defence force into the Manus Island Detention Centre. Dutton responded saying "There was difficulty, as I understand it, in the community. There was an alleged incident where three asylum seekers were alleged to be leading a local five-year old boy back toward the facility and there was a lot of angst around that, if you like, within the local PNG community." "I think there was concern about why the boy was being led or for what purpose he was being led away back into the regional processing centre. So I think it's fair to say that the mood had elevated quite quickly. I think some of the local residents were quite angry about this particular incident and another alleged sexual assault." The regional police commander on Manus Island said a young boy who was ten, not five, had gone to the centre two weeks earlier to ask for food. He said "It's a total separate incident altogether". The Greens senator Nick McKim said Dutton had lied. "This has disturbing echoes of the children overboard affair lies."

On 31 October 2017, the Papuan government closed down the Manus Island regional processing centre. However, 600 men residing in the processing centre refused to be moved to alternative accommodation in the town of Lorengau and staged a protest. Dutton defended the closure of the processing centre and said that the Papuan authorities had given notice of the camp's impending closure in May 2017. He also rejected Australian Greens Senator Nick McKim's report that there was no safe alternative accommodation available and claimed McKim was causing trouble. Following a prolonged standoff with Papuan security forces, the remaining men were evacuated, many forcibly, to new accommodation. Arrangements have been made to resettle an unspecified number of the asylum seekers in the United States. The others will be moved to either a different part of Papua New Guinea or a different country.

In mid-November 2017, Dutton rejected an offer by the newly-elected New Zealand Prime Minister Jacinda Ardern to resettle 150 asylum seekers from the Manus Island detention centre in New Zealand and warned that it would have repercussions for the two countries' bilateral relations. He also claimed that New Zealand's offer would encourage people smugglers. Dutton also criticised a New Zealand offer to provide $3 million for services for asylum seekers on Manus and Nauru as a "waste of money" that could be spent elsewhere, such as displaced people in Indonesia. In addition, Dutton criticised Australia's Opposition Leader Bill Shorten's call for Australia to accept the New Zealand offer as an attempt to appease the Labor Left with "cheap political stunts and mealy-mouthed words".

=== Minister for Home Affairs (2017–2021) ===
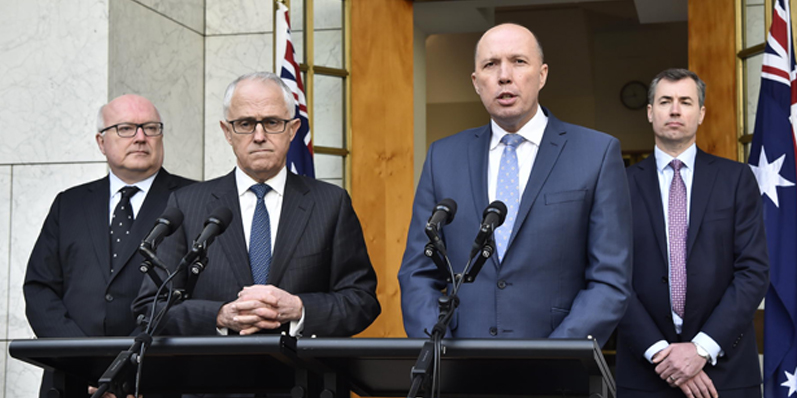
Dutton (second from right) announcing the creation of the new Home Affairs portfolio in July 2017

On 20 December 2017, Dutton was appointed the Minister for Home Affairs with responsibilities of overseeing the Department of Home Affairs which was established on 20 December 2017 by Administrative Arrangement Order. The Home Affairs portfolio is a major re-arrangement of national security, law enforcement, emergency management, transport security, border control, and immigration functions.

==== South African farm attacks ====
In March 2018, Dutton made calls to treat white South African farmers as refugees, stating that "they need help from a civilised country". However, his offer was rejected by Afrikaner rights organisation AfriForum, which stated that the future of Afrikaners was in Africa, as well as by the survivalist group the Suidlanders, which took credit for bringing the issue of a purported "white genocide" to international attention and for Dutton's decision, and was met with "regret" by the South African foreign ministry. The Australian High Commissioner was subsequently summoned by the South African foreign ministry, which expressed its offence at Dutton's statements, and demanded a "full retraction".

His proposal got support from some of his party's backbenchers and Liberal Democrat Senator David Leyonhjelm with Leyonhjelm later clarifying that he thought that South African farmers should be admitted under existing visa programmes, and could not be regarded as refugees. National Party of Australia MP Andrew Broad warned that the mass migration of South African farmers would result in food shortages in South Africa. Economic Freedom Fighters leader Julius Malema encouraged white farmers to take up Dutton's offer. After initially leaving the door open to changes, Australian Foreign Minister Julie Bishop subsequently ruled out any special deals for white South African farmers, emphasising the non-discriminatory nature of Australia's humanitarian visa programme. In a subsequent interview, Dutton vowed to push forward with his plans, saying that his critics were "dead to me".

In April 2018, it emerged that Dutton's department had previously blocked asylum applications by a white farmer, and another white South African woman, with the decisions upheld by the Administrative Appeals Tribunal.

==== Immigration from New Zealand ====
As both Immigration Minister and Home Affairs Minister, Peter Dutton has defended an amendment to the Migration Act 1958 that facilitates the denial or cancellation of Australian visas for non-citizens on "character" grounds. This stringent "character test" also affects non-citizens who have lived most of their lives in Australia or who have families living in the country. New Zealand nationals living in Australia were disproportionately affected by this "character test" with over 1,300 New Zealanders having been deported from Australia in the period between January 2015 and July 2018. According to a Home Affairs Department report, 620 New Zealanders had their visas cancelled on character grounds in 2017 alone.

In July 2017, Dutton's Department of Immigration and Border Protection introduced a special Skilled Independent subclass 189 visa to provide a pathway for New Zealanders holding a Special Category Visa to acquire Australian citizenship. The visa requires NZ nationals to have held a Special Category Visa for five years and to maintain an annual income of $53,900. Between 60,000 and 80,000 New Zealanders residing in Australia are eligible for the Skilled Independent subclass 189 visa. By February 2018, 1,512 skilled independent visas had been issued by late February 2018 with another 7,500 visas still being processed. The Skilled Independent subclass 189 visa was criticised by Australian Greens Senator Nick McKim as a stealth means of favouring "English-speaking, white and wealthy" migrants.

In February 2018, Dutton used his discretionary powers as Minister of Home Affairs to deport New Zealander Caleb Maraku on the grounds that he breached the "character test" provision of the Migration Act 1958. Maraku had been sentenced to 12 months probation for committing a one punch attack on another youth in Queensland's Gold Coast in November 2017. Maraku's perceived lenient sentencing and insensitive behaviour following his sentence had drawn substantial media and public attention, including a 50,000 strong petition calling for his deportation. In response to Maraku's case, Dutton stated:

It's no different to being invited into somebody's home - you don't start assaulting the residents of that house, you don't start assaulting Australian citizens and if you do you are shown the door.

In early July 2018, Dutton ordered the deportation of controversial New Zealand Baptist Pastor Logan Robertson, who had disrupted services at two mosques in Kuraby and Darra in Brisbane. Dutton approved Robertson's visa cancellation on the grounds that he had violated the conditions of his visa, stating that "we have a wonderful tradition in our country of freedom of speech, but we're not going to tolerate people going to a place of worship and harassing others". Robertson had earlier drawn controversy in New Zealand for his homophobic remarks and opposition to same-sex marriage.

In mid-July 2018, Dutton's immigration "character test" became the subject of a controversial Australian Broadcasting Corporation documentary, entitled "Don't Call Australia Home", focusing on New Zealanders who had been deported from Australia. In response, Dutton issued a tweet defending his deportation policy and claiming that deporting 184 "bikies" saved Australia A$116 million. In response, the New Zealand Minister of Justice Andrew Little, who also appeared in the documentary, criticised Australia's deportation laws for lacking "humanitarian ideals." The documentary's release also coincided with the release of a 17-year-old New Zealand youth from an Australian detention centre, which had caused friction between the two governments. In response, Dutton defended his government's policy of deporting non-citizen criminals and chastised New Zealand for not contributing enough to assist Australian naval patrols intercepting the "people smugglers."

In mid-July 2019, Dutton defended Australia's right to deport criminal non-citizens in response to concerns raised by the visiting New Zealand Prime Minister Jacinda Ardern, stating:

We need to stand up for Australians. And the New Zealand prime minister is rightly doing that for her people. But where we've got Australian citizens who are falling victim in certain circumstances where people are sexually offending against children, for example, we've had a big push to try to deport those paedophiles.

In response, Patrick Keyzer and Dave Martin of La Trobe University criticised Dutton's pedophilia remarks as misleading and contended that most deportees from Australia had spent most of their lives in Australia and had little ties to New Zealand.

==== Protests ====
In October and November 2019, Dutton expressed his views on protesters and police response. He stated that when protesters break the law "There needs to be mandatory or minimum sentences imposed... A community expectation is that these people are heavily fined or jailed." He also agreed with an on-air statement made by conservative 2GB radio presenter Ray Hadley that protesters should not receive social security payments. Leader of the Australian Greens Richard Di Natale responded by saying that "Peter Dutton doesn't know what living in a democracy means" and claimed that he's "starting to sound more like a dictator than he is an elected politician. Because somebody says something that he doesn't like, that he doesn't support, he's saying we're going to strip away income support."

In November 2019, Dutton said that the States should make protesters pay for the cost of police response to demonstrations. He said of protesters: "For many of them they don't even believe in democracy... These people are completely against our way of life. These people can protest peacefully, as many people do, but the disruption that they seek to cause, the disharmony that they seek to sow within our society is unacceptable."

==== Policing ====
In December 2019, Dutton announced that airport security measures were to be increased to detect, deter and respond to potential threats to aviation safety. Measures include greater use of dogs and the deployment of extra protective services personnel armed with MK18 short-barreled rifles. Dutton appeared in a video alongside police personnel to announce the policy, sparking criticism of the potential use of police for political purposes. Earlier in March 2019, the Australian Federal Police Association had claimed that the AFP should be removed from the Department of Home Affairs to preserve its integrity and its ability to carry out investigations without government influence. Association president Angela Smith described it as "an embarrassing situation... We look the least independent police force in Australia, surely the other police forces are laughing at us."

==== Leadership challenges ====
On 21 August 2018, Prime Minister Malcolm Turnbull called a snap ballot of the leadership of the Liberal Party following several days of feverish leadership speculation, of which Dutton was at the centre. Dutton responded to Turnbull's ballot call by formally challenging for the leadership of the party and won 35 of 83 votes available, 7 short of a majority. Dutton then resigned from the Ministry despite being offered by Turnbull to retain his position of Minister for Home Affairs, and the media speculated that Dutton and his conservative backers in the party were likely to challenge for the leadership again in the near future.

On 22 August 2018, Dutton described what his policies would be if he were to be elected leader of the Coalition. These included scrapping the GST on electricity, which Scott Morrison described as "an absolute budget blower". He also floated the idea of having a royal commission into electricity companies. Three days later, Dutton called for another leadership spill, and Malcolm Turnbull tendered his resignation to the Governor-General. Dutton was defeated by Treasurer and Acting Home Affairs Minister Scott Morrison by 45 votes to 40. Doubts surrounding Dutton's eligibility to be elected to parliament emerged on the grounds of section 44(v) of the Australian Constitution, as the family trust owned by Dutton operated a child care centre that received over $5.6 million in funding from the Commonwealth government, in a situation similar to Bob Day's case. Although Dutton had received legal advice stating that he was not in breach of section 44(v), Labor had received contrary advice; at Turnbull's request, the Attorney-General referred the matter to the Solicitor-General.

On 23 August 2018, Labor attempted to move a motion to refer Dutton's eligibility as an MP to the High Court, in a similar manner to referrals made during the recent parliamentary citizenship crisis. The motion failed by 69 votes to 68. On 24 August, the Solicitor-General advised that in terms of section 44(v) Dutton was "not incapable" of sitting as an MP, although he added that he had been provided with limited factual information and that, owing to differences of judicial opinion in earlier decisions of the High Court on section 44(v), Dutton's legal position could not be entirely clear without a referral to the High Court. Dutton was reappointed to his former Home Affairs portfolio by Scott Morrison in the Morrison Ministry; however, responsibility for Immigration was stripped from the role and was assigned to David Coleman.

==== 2019 federal election ====
Dutton was re-elected at the 2019 election. The political think tank GetUp! identified Dutton as "Australia's most unwanted hard-right politician" after surveying more than "30,000 members". GetUp! mounted a campaign in an attempt to defeat Dutton in Dickson. In response, Dutton said that GetUp! was "deceptive", "undemocratic" and "unrepresentative", and that he would back "parliamentary processes to bring the activist group to heel". GetUp! has defended the effectiveness of its campaigning in Dutton's electorate.

=== Minister for Defence (2021–22) ===
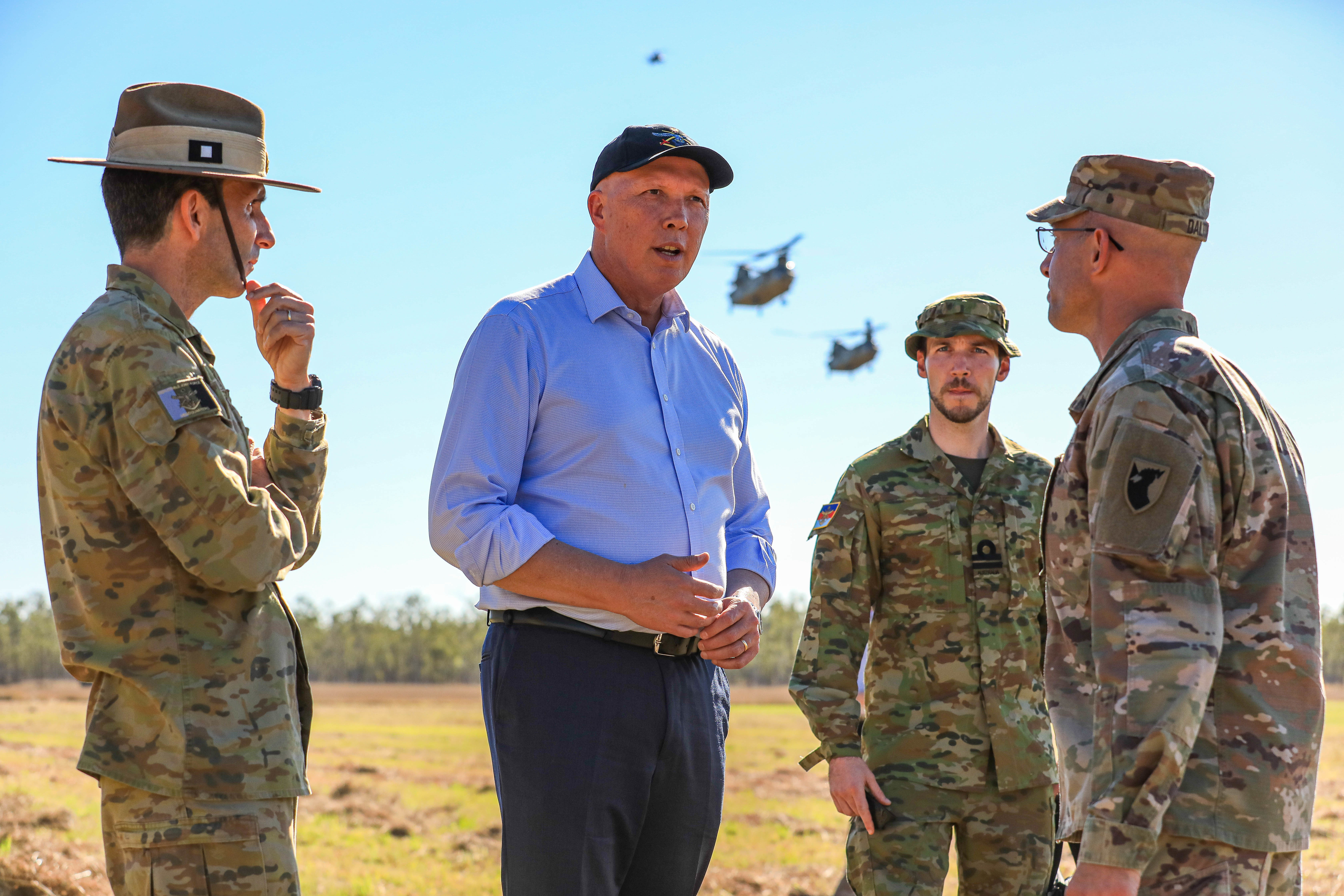
Dutton at Exercise Talisman Sabre 2021, flanked by Major General Jake Ellwood and US Colonel Matthew Dalton

In March 2021, Dutton was appointed Minister for Defence. On 21 May 2021, Dutton directed the department and serving military personnel to stop pursuing a "woke agenda", and cease holding events to mark the International Day Against Homophobia, Biphobia, Interphobia and Transphobia where staff wore rainbow clothing. On 11 July 2021, Dutton announced the end of Australia's military presence in Afghanistan. In October 2021, Dutton said Australia will back up any U.S. effort to defend Taiwan if China attacks. In November 2021, he branded the former Prime Minister Paul Keating as "Grand Appeaser Comrade Keating".

==== Defamation case ====
On 16 June 2021, in the Federal Court, Justice Richard White ordered Dutton to attend mediation over a defamation suit he brought against refugee activist Shane Bazzi over a tweet calling him a "rape apologist". In August 2021, it was announced that this mediation had failed. On 24 November 2021, White ruled in Dutton's favour and awarded $35,000 in defamation damages, but refused Dutton's bid for an injunction to prevent Bazzi tweeting about him. This decision was overturned on 17 May 2022 by the Full Court of the Federal Court, which found that the words "rape apologist", taken in the context of the whole message together with the Guardian article to which it was linked, referred to Dutton's attitude not to rape itself but toward claims of having been raped and accordingly did not amount to defamation.

== Leader of the Opposition (2022–2025) ==
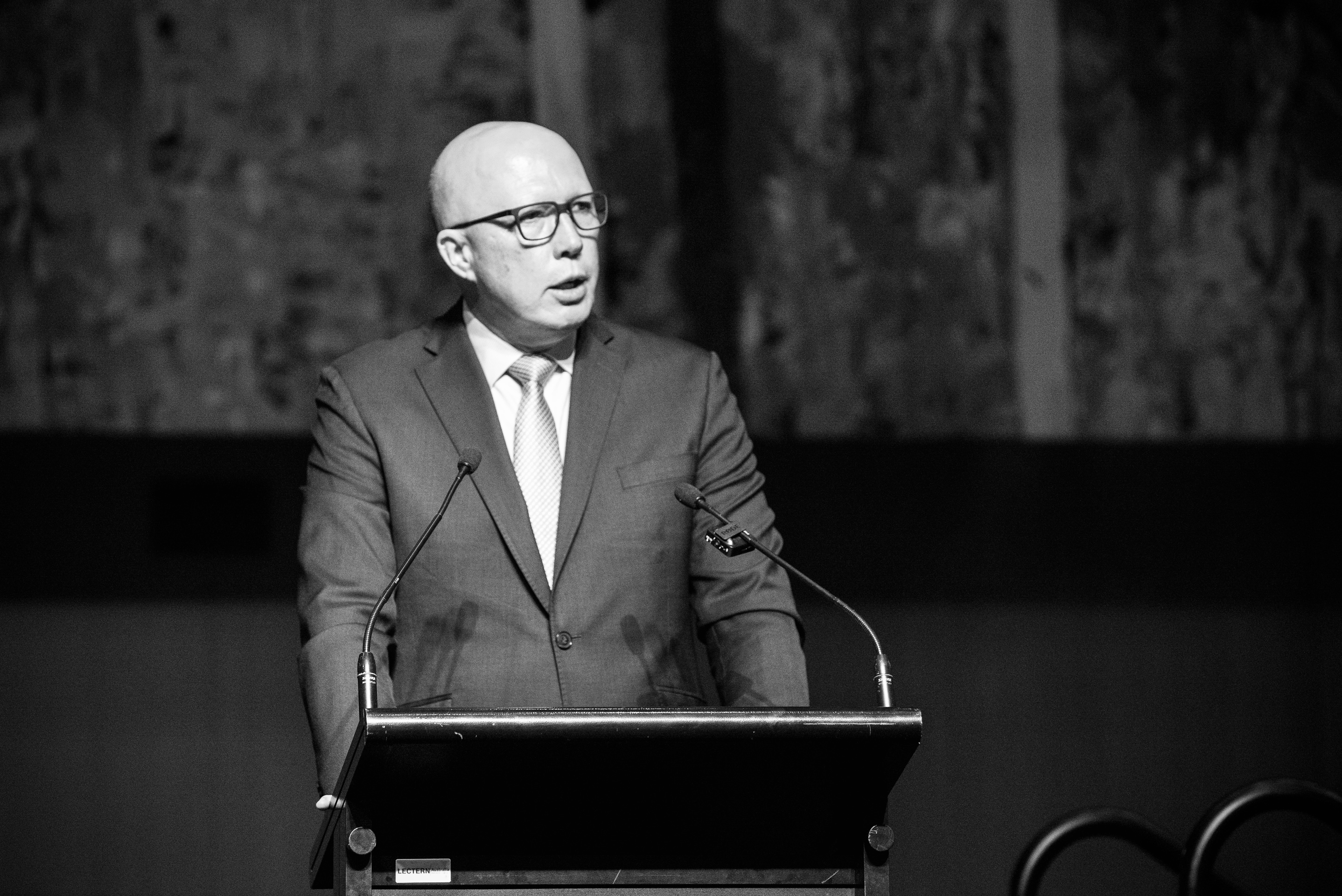
Dutton speaking at an event in 2023

The Coalition was defeated at the 2022 election, with Dutton retaining his seat despite a swing against him. After Scott Morrison resigned as leader of the Liberal Party, Dutton was elected unopposed as the new leader, with Sussan Ley elected as deputy. While in parliament in December 2022, Dutton repeatedly, after multiple corrections, referred incorrectly to Sharon Claydon as "Mr Speaker". On 1 April 2023, a by-election was held in the seat of Aston, triggered by the resignation of Liberal MP Alan Tudge. In a surprise result, the Labor candidate Mary Doyle won the election, marking the first time since 1920 that an Australian government had won a by-election from the opposition. Having said during the campaign that the result would be a "verdict on the leaders", Dutton said afterwards that he accepted responsibility for the result, but still deserved to remain Liberal leader.

In April 2023, Dutton announced that the Liberal Party would oppose the 2023 Australian Indigenous Voice referendum. Although members of the Liberal frontbench were forced to adopt this position, party backbenchers were free to campaign for the referendum. Dutton's stance on the referendum was immediately met with opposition from within the Liberal Party. On 6 April, former Liberal MP Ken Wyatt resigned from the party in protest. The following week, shadow Attorney-General Julian Leeser quit the Liberal frontbench and moved to the backbenches so he could freely campaign in favour of the referendum. The next day, Simon Birmingham, the leader of the Liberal Party in the Senate, also announced that he would not be adopting the party position.

Following a shadow cabinet reshuffle, Jacinta Nampijinpa Price was appointed the shadow Minister for Indigenous Australians on 18 April 2023. Following allegations of sexual harassment and assault made by independent Senator Lidia Thorpe, Dutton removed Liberal Senator David Van from the Liberal party room on 15 June 2023. In August 2023, Dutton said that ballot counting rules in the upcoming 2023 Australian Indigenous Voice referendum were "rigged", attracting criticism from MPs. On 3 September 2023, Dutton committed to hold a second referendum on Indigenous recognition if the Voice referendum failed, while also expressing support for his party's election proposal for a series of legislated local bodies (without a national one). However, following the defeat of the Voice proposal, Dutton stated that his party's prior commitment to symbolic constitutional recognition would be reviewed and that "it's clear the Australian public is probably over the referendum process for some time". On 10 January 2024, Dutton called for a boycott of Woolworths after it confirmed that it will no longer stock Australia Day-themed merchandise due to reduced sales over recent years.

In July 2024, Dutton's remarks relating to Fatima Payman were characterised by Laura Tingle as "an example of how to surgically hit every hot-button issue in one short grab for the cameras" (see § Muslim political alliance). On 29 July 2024, Dutton arrived in Israel for a three-day visit reimbursed by the Australia/Israel & Jewish Affairs Council. He met Israeli prime minister Benjamin Netanyahu and other top officials.

=== Home Affairs revelations ===
In 2023 and 2024, a number of stories regarding Dutton's leadership of the Department of Home Affairs reached the public for the first time. It was revealed that a 2020 report had uncovered serious issues with the department's detention approach, but Dutton had chosen not to act. In February 2024, the independent Richardson Review was published, which uncovered a number of damning failures of governance at the Department of Home Affairs while Dutton was minister. It was revealed that under Dutton's leadership:

- The department had made multi-million dollar contracts with companies suspected of criminal activity, including drug smuggling, corruption, and bypassing US sanctions.
- Dutton had personally intervened with the department to allow a criminal to stay in Australia, stating that it would be in the public interest.
- The department had made an extremely lucrative contract with Paladin without a competitive tender process, and despite the company being registered to a beach shack on Kangaroo Island. In two separate cases, KPMG had audited the wrong company before a contract was awarded.

An editorial in The Age noted that the department seemed to lack accountability, with nobody found responsible for any of the failings. However, media outlets including News Corporation and the ABC largely ignored the scandal. At the same time, the department was involved in another scandal, when $80 million intended for Papua New Guinea disappeared. The payments were in return for resettling refugees from Manus Island, however, service providers stopped receiving payments in 2022, and neither government could explain why. Shortly after these revelations, a group of 30 men arrived in Australia by boat. Dutton blamed the Albanese government, and misleadingly claimed that Labor had cut $600 million from Operation Sovereign Borders.

=== 2025 federal election ===
Dutton led the Liberal-National Coalition to the 2025 election. He ran what was considered by numerous commentators to be a poor campaign, and was beset by policy blunders and gaffes. Early in the campaign, Dutton walked back an election pledge to restrict work-from-home arrangements for public servants and sack 41,000 Canberra-based public servants, conceding that he had "made a mistake". At the election on 3 May, the Coalition suffered its worst ever defeat at a federal election and was reduced to just 43 seats in the House of Representatives, with Labor winning 94. Dutton lost his own seat of Dickson, with Labor challenger Ali France defeating him on her third attempt. Going into the election, Dutton held Dickson on an extremely marginal 1.7 percent. However, he lost over seven percent of his primary vote from 2022 and was defeated on a swing of 7.7 percent after all preferences were distributed. It was the third time since Federation that a major-party leader had lost their own seat, and the first time an Opposition Leader had been defeated in their own seat.

In his concession speech, Dutton accepted responsibility for the party's defeat. His defeat was compared to the loss of the Conservative Party of Canada in the 2025 Canadian federal election held earlier that week, with both results being ascribed to a rise of hostile sentiment toward US President Donald Trump that had a negative effect on conservative parties worldwide. Parallels were also drawn from Dutton to Canadian Conservative party leader Pierre Poilievre, who also lost his own seat.

==== Aftermath ====
On 7 May, Dutton spoke publicly for the first time since his election defeat. He stated that he planned to make a "graceful exit" from politics, but declined to comment on who should replace him as leader of the Liberal Party. Dutton's deputy Sussan Ley defeated Angus Taylor in a leadership election to succeed him as leader. After serving for almost 24 years in the Australian House of Representatives, Dutton is eligible for a pension of approximately $258,000 a year.

Dutton made an appearance at a Liberal-National Party convention in Brisbane in August 2025. He praised Ley and David Littleproud for doing a "great job". Ley similarly paid tribute to her immediate predecessor in her address to the convention. When Dutton was asked about a possible political comeback, he replied "No, mate, I'm too old for that."

In January 2026, it was revealed that Dutton had delayed the public release of the Liberal Party's internal review of the election campaign, after alleging that it contained defamatory material. Leaked portions of the review were highly critical of Dutton's campaigning.

=== Post-political career ===
Dutton was appointed as non-executive director to the board of LifeFlight Commercial in March 2026. He was also appointed as non-executive director to the board of the Queensland Investment Corporation by the state's Liberal-National government.

== Political positions ==
Dutton is aligned with the "National Right" faction of the Liberal Party, which he led and was considered the pre-eminent member of. He has been described as a right-wing populist, with some of his positions being compared to those of Donald Trump and Trumpism, leading to him being mockingly dubbed "Temu Trump" by some media outlets. Dutton is opposed to an Australian republic. In December 2018, Dutton told Sky News Australia that for the prior seventeen years he had regarded "parliament as a disadvantage for sitting governments".

=== Social issues ===
==== Drug prohibition ====
On 26 September 2019, one day after the partial decriminalisation of personal cannabis use by the Australian Capital Territory (ACT) government, Dutton called the decision "unconscionable" and "dangerous" in a 2GB interview. In September 2023, Dutton characterised ACT legislation on the limited decriminalisation of illicit substances as "crazy", saying that Canberra would become a "boom market" for drug gangs.

==== LGBT rights ====
In March 2017, The Sydney Morning Herald reported Dutton had privately expressed the view that the legal recognition of same-sex marriage was inevitable, and that he contended that the Coalition taking the initiative was better than allowing Labor to oversee the process.

In March 2017, 31 CEOs signed a letter to Prime Minister Malcolm Turnbull calling for a free vote in the Australian Parliament on same-sex marriage. In response to this letter, on 16 March, Dutton said that the CEOs "shouldn't shove their views down our throats" and that CEOs who were "doing the wrong thing" should "be publicly shamed". Dutton repeated his criticism at a speech to the LNP State Council in Queensland on 18 March. The Herald then reported that "the forcefulness of Mr Dutton's attack on corporate chief executives last week—in which he told them to "stick to their knitting"—has aroused suspicion among some colleagues who believed he was committed to achieving a breakthrough on [same-sex marriage]". The following month, The Daily Telegraph reported that Dutton was asked by a lesbian for clarification on his position, and he "told her he had been clear that he was against same-sex marriage".

Writing in The Conversation, Michelle Grattan remarked, "those calling for more free speech are squealing increasingly loudly when others exercise their freedom in a way they don't like", comparing Dutton's public confrontation against his stance on Section 18C of the Racial Discrimination Act. Former New South Wales Premier Kristina Keneally commented in The Guardian, "In Dutton's Australia [...] Free speech is great and should be expanded, unless it's an Australian corporate CEO speaking about same-sex marriage. Then they need to shut up." Simon Birmingham expressed disagreement with Dutton's comments.

On 28 September 2017, following the news that US rapper Macklemore would sing a pro-marriage equality song at the NRL Grand Final, Dutton said in the name of free speech that "two songs should be played, one for gay marriage and one against gay marriage".

After becoming Liberal leader in 2022, Dutton stated "We are the Liberal Party. We believe in families – whatever their composition."

==== Gender ====
After US President Donald Trump signed an executive order which stated that the United States federal government will only recognize two genders, male and female, Nationals leader David Littleproud called on Australia to adopt a similar policy. Dutton dismissed Littleproud's comments saying that "We don't have any plans to change our position in relation to that issue."

==== Voting ====
In August 2023, Dutton said that ballot counting rules in the upcoming 2023 Australian Indigenous Voice referendum were "rigged", referring to the possibility for certain ticks — in addition to writing "yes" — to be sporadically treated as valid responses. In response, the Australian Electoral Commission stated that they rejected the assertions "completely and utterly". Senators David Pocock and Sarah Hanson-Young called the allegations a "new low". Independent MP Monique Ryan remarked that Dutton "will do anything, even undermine faith in our democratic processes, to score cheap political points". Rachel Withers, writing in The Monthly, characterised the claims as "Trumpian".

==== Indigenous affairs ====
In December 2024, Dutton stated his opposition to flying the Aboriginal and Torres Strait Islander flags alongside the national flag, viewing them as "a symbol of division" and saying that he would remove them from the official Australian government press conferences.

==== Education ====
In 2018, Dutton expressed support for school-aged children to be required to make a pledge similar to an Oath of Allegiance.

==== Social media ====
In 2024, Dutton supported moves for age verification on social media. Dutton's Coalition supported the Online Safety Amendment (Social Media Minimum Age) Act 2024, which banned users under sixteen years old from creating social media accounts. As Opposition Leader, he pledged to introduce laws that would make it an offence to post content on social media that promoted crime.

=== Environment ===
==== Climate change and energy ====
Dutton has been characterised as a climate change denier, and has said he would "let scientists pass that judgment" when questioned if he believed climate change had contributed to increasing extreme weather events. In 2024 and 2025, Dutton expressed his rejection of the Albanese government's climate policy, the Paris Agreement, and COP 31.

In a July 2023 address to the Institute of Public Affairs, Dutton argued for the adoption of nuclear power, calling it "the only feasible and proven technology" that can "firm up renewables and help us achieve the goals of clean, cost effective and consistent power". ABC journalist Monte Bovill characterised it as "ramping up calls for nuclear power in Australia". Dutton claimed that small modular reactors could be installed at decommissioned coal power plants, saying, "We can convert or repurpose coal-fired plants to use the transmission connections that already exist on those sites."

In October 2023, he expressed opposition to a proposed off-shore wind farm of New South Wales' Hunter Region, saying that the environmental impacts to "rare bird species" and the seabed were unknown. "We're all in favour of renewable energy, but not at any cost, and not where you're destroying jobs and livelihoods and the environment", Dutton remarked. In February and March 2024, Dutton expressed opposition to Labor's proposal to introduce new vehicle fuel efficiency standards. He called it "Mr Albanese's new ute tax and new family car tax". Dutton said that the proposal would increase the price of new vehicles.

Asked at a press conference on 12 March 2024 regarding the annual GenCost report from the Commonwealth Scientific and Industrial Research Organisation (CSIRO) identifying nuclear reactors as being more expensive than fossil fuels and renewable sources, Dutton called the report "discredited" and said that it was "well documented" that the CSIRO was unreliable. CSIRO chief executive Doug Hilton repudiated the allegations.

In November 2022, former Liberal prime minister Malcolm Turnbull called Dutton's claims about the necessity of nuclear power "complete and utter nonsense". On 23 September 2024, Dutton remarked in a speech, "Labor tells you that renewables and nuclear can't work together. It's utter nonsense."

=== Migration ===
==== Humanitarian entrants ====
Before the 2016 election, Dutton voiced opposition to proposals to increase humanitarian visas, saying it could lead to large numbers struggling to integrate. "For many people, they won't be numerate or literate in their own language let alone English", Dutton remarked, adding "These people would be taking Australian jobs, there's no question about that." Turnbull defended Dutton by stating he is an "outstanding Immigration Minister".

==== Housing crisis ====
In the 2025 Australian federal election campaign, housing affordability and its link to immigration were central points of contention between Dutton and Prime Minister Anthony Albanese.

==== Muslim Lebanese–Australians ====
Asked in November 2016 during question time to clarify his earlier controversial comments regarding the "mistakes" made by the Malcolm Fraser government "in bringing some people in", Dutton replied that the majority of people charged with terrorist-related offences were "from second and third generation Lebanese–Muslim background". Tony Burke criticised Dutton, saying that Australian security agencies "would be devastated and shocked that a minister would do that". Foreign Minister Julie Bishop defended Dutton, saying that he was referring to the lack of "significant services" in Fraser's time, and specifically to people charged with terrorism offences, "He made it quite clear that he respects and appreciates the contribution that the Lebanese community make in Australia." According to former national security official Clark Jones, Dutton's remarks risked "creating the terrorists of the future".

On 25 November 2016, 30 Lebanese organisations met in Auburn to discuss the issue. According to The Sydney Morning Herald (SMH), Dutton was criticised for reversing "years of hard work in building cohesion" and "belittling the entire community". One anonymous group leader characterised the comments as "a smear on the 99.99 per cent of Australian Lebanese Muslims who are resiliently getting on with life despite the constant attacks on their identity". He added, "If Mr Dutton wants to play this game perhaps he can release the top three cultural backgrounds of the perpetrators of domestic violence, drunken assaults, paedophilia and rape. He might find the numbers slightly over representative of his own cultural cohort — white males." The Lebanese Muslim Association (LMA) demanded Dutton to either meet with community groups for an "open discussion", or "remain silent".

In a 2023 episode of Kitchen Cabinet, Annabel Crabb asked Dutton about the 2016 comments. He replied, "I have apologised for that". Asked by the SMH in August and September 2024, various community leaders said they were unaware of an apology; one likened the 2016 comments to Dutton's 2024 comments on Gazan refugees. However, Rifi expressed gratitude for Dutton's efforts to repatriate Australian orphans from Syria, saying "The guy is not heartless".

Lech Blaine, author of a 2024 Quarterly Essay piece about Dutton, said that she was unaware of an apology. Mehal Krayem, co-author of a 2019 paper on the subject of Dutton's comments and the media framing, doubted the existence of an apology. According to the SMH, no apology was identified after searches of newspaper archives, Dutton's Twitter publications and speech transcripts on his website. One day after the SMH article was published, Dutton said at a press conference that he had apologised to an unnamed "senior person".

==== "African gang violence" in Victoria ====
In January 2018, Dutton said that people in Melbourne were scared of going out because of "gang violence" involving African Australians. In an ABC interview, Jason Wood, Liberal MP representing the Division of La Trobe, repudiated suggestions that the rhetoric was an attempt at attracting race-based votes. Wood referred to the statistics he had obtained in a parliamentary migration inquiry. News.com.au reported that Dutton was "ridiculed" by Melbourne social media users. Dutton's comments formed part of a wider media discourse linking African immigrants to crime in Melbourne dating back to 2016, after violent disturbances at the Moomba Festival which were attributed by the press to the "Apex gang", a supposed African crime gang for which little evidence existed. According to a 2019 study by Monash University, Dutton's remarks followed a "flurry of 'sensationalist' media pieces about 'African gangs' in Melbourne" and members of the African-Australian community felt "stigmatised and labelled because of their race and perceived association with criminality".

In 2020, Malcolm Turnbull expressed regret over defending Dutton for his comments at the time, suggesting that he was "too trusting" and that he used to attribute the "sometimes offensive remarks" from Dutton to "verbal clumsiness and awkwardness".

==== White South African farmers ====
In 2018, Dutton supported the intake of White South African victims of farm attacks. He described the circumstances as "horrific". BBC News reported that the message of 'white genocide', which had been promoted by the extremist Suidlanders, had resonated with Dutton, who claimed he was considering the provision of fast-track visas to white South African farmers. Dutton referred to the farmers as being "persecuted" and needing help from a "civilised" country. Australian Greens leader Richard Di Natale denounced the proposal as racist, saying that it would be a return to the White Australia Policy.

==== "Anchor babies" ====
In September 2019, Dutton characterised the two children of the Biloela family — asylum claimants detained at Melbourne Immigration Transit Accommodation — as "anchor babies" who were being used to "leverage a migration outcome based on the children".

==== Muslim political alliance ====
In July 2024, Dutton remarked about Fatima Payman's departure from the Labor Party. To Nine News, Dutton said that whilst he did not "have any problem with a party that has a religious view", there were "all sorts of problems" with supporting "a Palestinian cause or a cause outside of Australia" as "a first order of priority". At a press conference on 4 July, Dutton said of prime minister Anthony Albanese, "if he's in a minority government in the next term of parliament, it will include the Greens, it'll include the Green-teals, it'll include Muslim candidates from Western Sydney, it will be a disaster." Laura Tingle characterised the remarks as "an example of how to surgically hit every hot-button issue in one short grab for the cameras". Cricketer Usman Khawaja called his comments "an absolute disgrace" and "bigotry at its finest", contending that he was "fuelling Islamophobia from the very top".

==== Gazan migration ====
On 14 August 2024, Dutton criticised the Labor government in a Sky News Australia interview over what he saw as inadequate vetting of people fleeing from Gaza, saying that he did not think "people should be coming in from that war zone at all at the moment" and that he thought "it puts our national security at risk". He contended that Australians "would be shocked to think that the government's bringing in people from a war zone" and asserted that the Australian Security Intelligence Organisation was "not conducting checks and searches on these people". Later that day, Anthony Albanese reacted in an ABC News Breakfast interview, saying that Dutton "always seeks to divide". He said that the government took advice from intelligence agencies and not "from someone always looking for a fight, always looking for division".

=== Housing ===
==== Negative gearing ====
Dutton opposes any changes to negative gearing which offers tax breaks to property investors, saying in May 2017 that changing it would harm the economy. He owns six properties with his wife, including a shopping centre in Townsville.

== Personal life ==
Dutton married his first wife when he was 22 years of age; the marriage ended after a few months. His eldest child, a daughter, was born in 2002 to another partner, and split time between her parents in a shared parenting arrangement. In 2003, Dutton married his second wife, Kirilly (née Brumby), with whom he has two sons.

Dutton "identifies with the Catholic Church even if he does not attend church regularly".

On 13 March 2020, Dutton announced that he had tested positive for COVID-19, becoming the first federal cabinet member to do so.

Dutton suffers from the skin condition alopecia totalis.

Dutton supports the Brisbane Broncos in the National Rugby League, but also backed the eventually successful membership bid for a second Brisbane team in the league (the Dolphins). In the Australian Football League, he supports the Brisbane Lions.

Dutton formerly owned a large farm estate in Dayboro.

== Electoral performance ==
View source data.

Electoral history
Election	Division	First preference	Two-party vote
2001	Dickson	45.58%	55.97%
2004	Dickson	52.09%	57.83%
2007	Dickson	46.15%	50.13%
2010	Dickson	48.96%	55.13%
2013	Dickson	48.01%	56.72%
2016	Dickson	44.56%	51.60%
2019	Dickson	45.93%	54.64%
2022	Dickson	42.07%	51.70%
2025	Dickson	34.35%	43.45%

== Sources ==
- Blaine, Lech (2024). Bad Cop: Peter Dutton's strongman politics. Quarterly Essay. Black Inc. ISBN 9781743823415.

Parliament of Australia
Preceded by Cheryl Kernot	Member for Dickson; 2001–2025	Succeeded by Ali France
Political offices
Preceded by Fran Bailey as Minister for Employment Services	Minister for Workforce Participation; 2004–2006	Succeeded by Sharman Stone
Preceded by Mal Brough	Minister for Revenue and Assistant Treasurer; 2006–2007	Succeeded by Chris Bowen as Assistant Treasurer
Preceded by Lindsay Tanner as Shadow Minister for Finance	Shadow Minister for Finance, Competition Policy and Deregulation; 2007–2008	Succeeded by Joe Hockey
Preceded by Chris Bowen as Shadow Minister for Revenue and Competition Policy	Shadow Minister for Finance, Competition Policy and Deregulation; 2007–2008	Succeeded by Joe Hockey
Preceded by Joe Hockey	Shadow Minister for Health and Ageing; 2008–2013	Succeeded by Catherine King as Shadow Minister for Health
Preceded by Tanya Plibersek as Minister for Health and Medical Research	Minister for Health; 2013–2014	Succeeded by Sussan Ley
Preceded by Don Farrell	Minister for Sport; 2013–2014	Succeeded by Sussan Ley
Preceded by Scott Morrison	Minister for Immigration and Border Protection; 2014–2018	Succeeded by David Coleman as Minister for Immigration, Citizenship and Multicultural Affairs
Preceded by Jason Clare	Minister for Home Affairs; 2017–2021	Succeeded by Karen Andrews
Preceded by Linda Reynolds	Minister for Defence; 2021–2022	Succeeded by Richard Marles
Preceded by Christian Porter	Leader of the House; 2021–2022	Succeeded by Tony Burke
Preceded by Anthony Albanese	Leader of the Opposition of Australia; 2022–2025	Succeeded by Sussan Ley
Party political offices
Preceded by Scott Morrison	Leader of the Liberal Party of Australia; 2022–2025	Succeeded by Sussan Ley
