= Women's Justice Network =

Australian charity

- Founded: 2008
- Type: Charitable organization
- Purpose: Advocacy, Mentoring, Prison reform, Criminal Justice
- Location: Sydney, Australia
- Region served: New South Wales
- Website: www.womensjusticenetwork.org.au

Women's Justice Network (WJN), formerly known as the Women in Prison Advocacy Network (WIPAN), is an incorporated not-for-profit charity based in Sydney, Australia, focused on advocacy around issues affecting female prisoners.

== History ==
WIPAN was founded in 2008 by Kat Armstrong, Carol Berry, Marissa Sandler and Nicki Petrou, and is managed by a volunteer Management Committee, (The Board). WIPAN's co-founder Kat Armstrong was the organisation’s volunteer Director/CEO from early 2008 to January 2016.

The organisation expanded in 2014, thanks to a grant from the Department of Family and Community Services (NSW), and from early 2016, a new CEO, mentoring coordinator and housing and family coordinator were all able to be employed. WIPAN has also received small, one off charity grants and funding grants of the NSW Government, such as the three years of one-off funding grants from, the NSW Government, Office of Women, used to establish WIPAN's mentoring service in 2009.

WIPAN maintained that 84 per cent of women sent to prison in 2017 had committed non-violent offences.

In 2017, WIPAN rebranded with the trading name WJN and retained WIPAN as its legal name.

== Description and aims ==
It is a volunteer-based organisation and focuses on advocacy around issues affecting female prisoners, providing support to women exiting prison through its mentoring program, with the aim to reduce rates of female incarceration and recidivism.

The organisation's work involves undertaking research and systemic advocacy around the needs of women prisoners and ex-prisoners at an institutional level, whilst also assisting ex-prisoners at an individual level through its mentoring program, the only such non-government service in New South Wales (NSW).

== Activities ==
In consultation with other community groups, as well as partner peak body organisations such as the New South Wales Council of Social Services (NCOSS), WIPAN undertakes a broad range of research and advocacy activities including the production of resources guides, policy and research papers on issues such as the housing and support needs of women leaving prison and prisoner health. The organisation makes submissions to government on policy matters affecting female prisoners and their families such as sentencing, Apprehended Violence Orders (AVO) and prison privatisation.

In 2011, with funding from the Myer Foundation and working with the Public Interest Advocacy Centre (PIAC), WIPAN produced a self-help guide for women prisoners in NSW. The guide was designed to be distributed to female prisoners before release, and assist them to meet their own financial, housing, health, and legal needs, once in the community.

In 2012, with funding from the NSW Office for Women, WIPAN produced The Long Road to Freedom: A guide for women to escape the cycle of domestic violence and jail, a guide designed to assist women experiencing domestic violence who are also affected by the criminal justice system.

WIPAN attends and presents at conferences nationally on issues affecting female prisoners; participating in the 2009 and 2011 Sisters Inside Conferences on Prisons; and in 2012 at the Complex Needs Conference hosted by the University of Sydney.

== Women's Mentoring Program ==
WIPAN operates a volunteer-based mentoring program for women exiting the NSW criminal justice system which aims to reduce rates of recidivism amongst female inmates by providing women leaving prison with a meaningful support network, and to assist ex-prisoners to build connections with the broader community. The role of the mentor in the program is to assist the mentee to access necessary services, and to build a relationship of mutual trust and respect through regular face-to-face meetings, and the provision of social and emotional support. The program was developed and accredited by NSW TAFE up until 2015, and was responsible for training 50 community volunteers to act as mentors in an initial 18-month pilot program from May 2010 until November 2011.

In 2012, after two years of the program 82 percent of the programs 85 participants had not re-offended, despite 92 percent of participants having served between five and seven prior custodial sentences before entering the program.

== Awards and recognition ==
- In 2011, the Law and Justice Foundation of NSW's Justice Award was awarded to WIPAN Director Kat Armstrong.
- In 2012, The Australian Centre For Leadership For Women's Gold Sustaining Women’s Empowerment in Communities and Organisations (SWECO) Award was given to Kat Armstrong for her work in founding WIPAN.
- In 2012 WIPAN was awarded by the Australian Government and Australian Institute of Criminology (AIC) the 2012 Australian Crime & Violence Prevention Award for outstanding work in crime prevention, and for the success of its women’s mentoring program.
