= Ali France =

Australian politician (born 1973)

Ali France MP
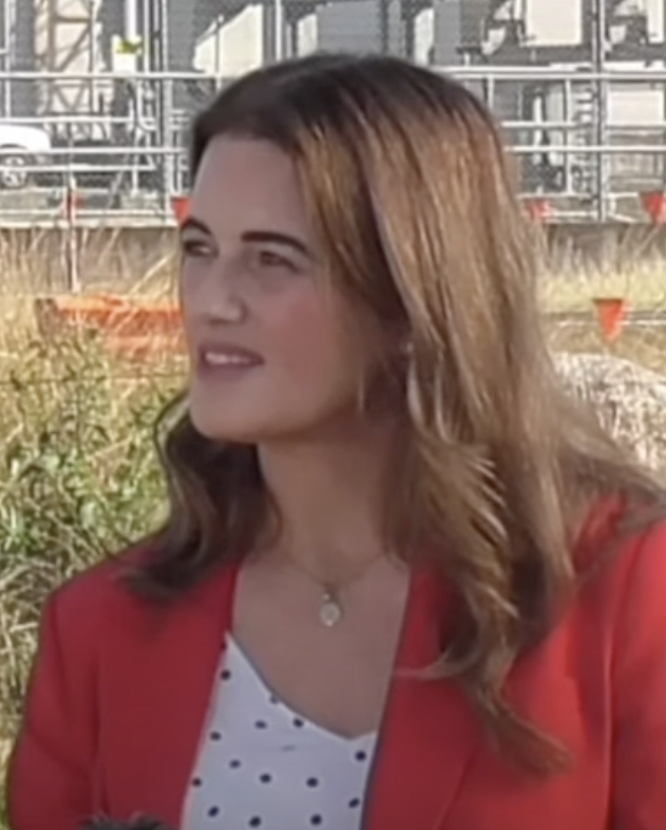

Member of the Australian Parliament for Dickson
- Incumbent
- Assumed office 3 May 2025
- Preceded by: Peter Dutton

Personal details
- Born: Allison Anne Lawlor; 13 May 1973 (age 53) Durban, South Africa
- Citizenship: Australia
- Party: Labor
- Spouse: Clive France (div. 2019)
- Children: 2
- Parent: Peter Lawlor (father)
- Education: University of Southern Queensland
- Profession: Journalist; Disability rights advocate Para-athlete

Allison Anne France (pron. /ˈeɪliː/ "AYY-lee"; née Lawlor; born 13 May 1973) is an Australian politician who has served as the member for Dickson in the House of Representatives since 2025 as a member of the Australian Labor Party (ALP).

France previously contested her seat in 2019 and 2022, both times losing to the incumbent Liberal Party MP Peter Dutton. On her third attempt in the 2025 election, she unseated Dutton, who was the Leader of the Opposition at the time, and became the first Labor MP from Dickson since Cheryl Kernot lost the seat to Dutton in 2001. She also became the first challenger to defeat a sitting Opposition Leader in their own seat.

== Early life and education ==
France is the daughter of Peter Lawlor, former MP for Southport in the Queensland Legislative Assembly. She was born in Durban, South Africa and educated on the Gold Coast, Toowoomba and Canberra.

== Career ==
Prior to entering politics, France was a journalist at The Courier-Mail, as well as in Hong Kong, and worked as communications manager for indigenous production company Carbon Media in Brisbane. She is also a former para-athlete and a disability advocate. A disability rights advocate who campaigned for France, Elly Desmarchelier, has been quoted as stating that "All policy is disability policy".

In 2016, France represented Australia in paracanoeing, winning two team gold medals and a silver at the Outrigger Canoe World Sprint Championships.

France has been a critic of offshore detention, noting that the surgeon who inserted her titanium rod prosthetic leg was a former Iraqi refugee who came to Australia by boat. She ran as the Labor candidate for the seat of Dickson in 2019 and 2022, losing both times to Peter Dutton, who was first elected as the MP for Dickson in 2001. She faced Dutton, then Leader of the Liberal Party and Leader of the Opposition, for a third time at the 2025 Australian federal election, this time defeating him amid a large swing against the Liberals in metropolitan Australia. On the eighth count, over three-fourths of Green preferences flowed to France, allowing her to defeat Dutton on a two-party swing of 7.7 percent. She needed a swing of only 1.8 percent to take the seat off Dutton. France is the third challenger since Federation to defeat a major-party leader in their own seat, and the first to unseat an Opposition Leader.

=== Electoral history ===
Australian House of Representatives
Election year	Electorate	Party	Votes	FP%	+/-	2PP%	+/-	Result
2019	Dickson	Labor	30,370	31.33	▼3.66	45.36	▼2.95	Second
2022	Dickson	Labor	31,396	31.70	▲0.37	48.30	▲2.94	Second
2025	Dickson	Labor	35,502	33.63	▲1.93	55.99	▲7.69	First

== Personal life ==
France and her ex-husband Clive had two sons. The two separated in 2017 and divorce was finalised in 2019. Clive was plagued by health issues for almost a decade and died of cancer in 2023.

In 2011, France and her younger son were at a shopping centre when an elderly man lost control of his car and ran into them. While she pushed her son, who was in his pram at the time, out of the way, she was seriously injured and as a result had her leg amputated.

In 2024, her eldest son died of leukaemia. France faced some criticism on social media for talking about her grief and loss during the election campaign. She responded by saying, "Politics is personal, actually ... my whole life is the reason I got into politics. I will never stop talking about him and I don't care whether it causes people to feel discomfort."

== See also ==
- Bruce Fanjoy, who similarly defeated the leader of the opposition in the Canadian election within the same week of France’s election.
- Political families of Australia

Parliament of Australia
Preceded by Peter Dutton	Member for Dickson; 2025–present	Incumbent
