= Cheryl Kernot =

Australian politician

5th Leader of the Australian Democrats
- In office 23 April 1993 – 15 October 1997
- Deputy: Meg Lees
- Preceded by: John Coulter
- Succeeded by: Meg Lees

Shadow Minister for Regional Development, Infrastructure, Transport and Regional Services
- In office 20 October 1998 – 10 November 2001
- Leader: Kim Beazley
- Preceded by: Simon Crean (Regional Development); Lindsay Tanner (Transport)
- Succeeded by: Martin Ferguson

Member of the Australian Parliament for Dickson
- In office 3 October 1998 – 10 November 2001
- Preceded by: Tony Smith
- Succeeded by: Peter Dutton

Senator for Queensland
- In office 1 July 1990 – 15 October 1997
- Preceded by: Michael Macklin
- Succeeded by: Andrew Bartlett

Personal details
- Born: Cheryl Zena Paton; 5 December 1948 (age 77) Maitland, New South Wales, Australia
- Party: Independent (after 2001)
- Other political affiliations: Democrat (until 1997); Labor (1997–2001)
- Spouses: Philip Young (m. 1972; div. 1975) Gavin Kernot (m. 1981; div. 2002)
- Children: 1
- Education: Maitland Girls' High School
- Alma mater: University of Sydney; University of Newcastle
- Occupation: School teacher (Anglican Church Grammar School) (Department of Education)
- Profession: Academic; Politician

Cheryl Zena Kernot (née Paton, formerly Young; born 5 December 1948) is an Australian politician, academic, and political activist. She was a member of the Australian Senate representing Queensland for the Australian Democrats from 1990 to 1997, and the fifth leader of the Australian Democrats from 1993 to 1997. In 1997, she resigned from the Australian Democrats, joined the Australian Labor Party, and won the seat of Dickson at the 1998 federal election. She was defeated at the 2001 federal election. Kernot was an unsuccessful independent candidate to represent New South Wales in the Australian Senate in the 2010 federal election.

== Early life ==
Kernot was born Cheryl Paton in Maitland, New South Wales, on 5 December 1948. She grew up working class and her father worked two jobs to provide for the family. Her maternal grandfather was an organiser for the Australian Labor Party in the Hunter Valley coalfields. She attended East Maitland Primary School and Maitland Girls' High School.

Kernot received a Commonwealth scholarship to attend the University of Sydney, where she studied government. She received a teaching diploma from the University of Newcastle and spent twelve years as a political activist while working as a school teacher in New South Wales and Queensland. She also worked as an electorate officer and freelance radio producer. In 1984, Kernot was elected Queensland Secretary of the Australian Democrats, and later in the year, Queensland State President, a position she held until 1999. Kernot served as Deputy National President of the party between 1988 until her election to the Senate in 1990.

== Political career ==
=== Democrats ===
Kernot was first elected as a Senator for Queensland at the 1990 election, taking over from the retiring Democrats Senator Michael Macklin.

Kernot surprised party members by immediately contesting the parliamentary deputy leadership, even before taking her place in the Senate on 1 July 1990. In 1991, she controversially acted to discredit and depose the elected leader, Janet Powell, resulting in Powell's replacement by John Coulter. Kernot finally achieved her ambition to become the Democrats' Senate leader after the 1993 election. Meg Lees was elected as her deputy. Inside the party, she spearheaded a drive for central control of the state-based organisations, which resulted in protest resignations of members and the temporary closure of the Western Australian Division. Externally, however, she became a popular media spokesperson, leading the party to one of its best-ever results in the 1996 election and obtaining a primary vote of over 13% for herself.

=== Labor Party ===
On 15 October 1997, Kernot abruptly moved to the Australian Labor Party, resigning her Senate seat and leaving the leadership of the Democrats to her deputy, Meg Lees, in what was described by journalist Monica Attard as a "defection [that] took the country by storm". In her resignation speech, Kernot did not criticise the Democrats, saying her motivation was due to a "growing sense of outrage at the damage being done to Australia by the Howard Government" and that her position leading a minor party in the Senate meant she "had a limited capacity to help minimise that damage". She also stated that she was "well aware of the political risks in this course of action". Some derided Kernot because of her ambition; and, according to journalist Julia Baird, she "found herself at odds with the leadership of the Labor Party". Baird went on to say "...[Kernot]...unravelled publicly under the stress, and she was portrayed in print as a has-been, a whinger and a poor performer".

Kernot narrowly won the outer metropolitan Brisbane seat of Dickson for Labor at the 1998 election, before losing it at the 2001 election to the Liberal Party candidate Peter Dutton. During her period as Member for Dickson, Kernot served in the Shadow Ministry, and held the roles of Shadow Minister for Regional Development, Infrastructure, Transport and Regional Services from 1998 to 1999, and Shadow Minister for Employment and Training from 1999 to 2001.

=== Electoral history ===
Australian Senate
Election year	Electorate	Party	Votes	FP%	+/-	Quota	+/-	Result
1984	Queensland	Democrats	707	0.05	▲0.05	0.04	▲0.04	Eliminated
1987	Queensland	Democrats	830	0.05	0.00	0.04	0.00	Eliminated
1990	Queensland	Democrats	207,086	12.37	▲12.32	0.88	▲0.84	Elected
1996	Queensland	Democrats	253,726	13.20	▲6.20	0.93	▲0.44	Elected
2010	New South Wales	Independent	7,965	0.15	▲0.15	0.13	▲0.13	Eliminated

Australian House of Representatives
Election year	Electorate	Party	Votes	FP%	+/-	2PP%	+/-	Result
1998	Dickson	Labor	29,899	40.60	▲1.26	50.12	▲4.02	First
2001	Dickson	Labor	26,557	33.26	▼7.34	44.03	▼6.09	Second

== Life outside politics ==
After retiring from politics, Kernot wrote an autobiography called Speaking for Myself, which was published in 2002. This book was focused on her political career, particularly her move from the Democrats to Labor. On 3 July 2002, in his regular weekly column in The Bulletin, political journalist Laurie Oakes criticised Kernot for failing to mention an extramarital affair she had with Gareth Evans while she was leader of the Democrats. Evans was deputy leader of the Labor Party and key advocate of her move to Labor. Oakes claimed that the relationship began several years before Kernot joined Labor, and ended in October 1999. He made the claim based on leaked emails in his possession that proved Kernot had a five-year relationship with Evans. Initially, Kernot and Evans made themselves unavailable for comment; however, Evans subsequently confirmed the nature of their relationship.

Kernot worked in the United Kingdom as Programme Director at the Skoll Centre for Social Entrepreneurship at the Said Business School at Oxford University and as the Director of Learning at the School for Social Entrepreneurs in London. Kernot is currently the Director of Social Business at the Centre for Social Impact, based at the University of New South Wales. She has also expressed support for Australia becoming a republic.

== Return to politics ==
On 30 July 2010, Kernot announced that she would run as a candidate for the Australian Senate representing New South Wales as an independent on a platform of "Change politics". She was not successful.

== Other interests ==
Kernot was one of Australia's first fully qualified female cricket umpires. She was patron of the Australian women's cricket team from 1994 to 2000.

Kernot is on the founding committee of a UK charity which works to provide shelter and education for street children in Kampala, Uganda.

In 2014 Kernot became the first patron of the Women in Prison Advocacy Network (WIPAN). WIPAN is a grassroots community charity dedicated to advancing the prospects and wellbeing of women and female youth affected by the criminal justice system. It does so through individual mentoring and advocacy.

Party political offices
Preceded by John Coulter	Leader of the Australian Democrats; 1993–1997	Succeeded by Meg Lees
Parliament of Australia
Preceded by Tony Smith	Member for Dickson; 1998–2001	Succeeded by Peter Dutton
Preceded by Michael Macklin	Senator for Queensland; 1990–1997	Succeeded by Andrew Bartlett
