= 2019 Australian House of Representatives election =

2019 Australian federal election (House of Representatives)
| ← 2016 | 18 May 2019 | 2022 → |
- All 151 seats in the Australian House of Representatives; 76 seats needed for a majority
- Turnout: 91.9%
| Party | Leader | Vote % | Seats | +/– |
|---|---|---|---|---|
| Labor | Bill Shorten | 33.3% | 68 | −1 |
| Liberal | Scott Morrison | 28.0% | 44 | −1 |
| Liberal National | Deb Frecklington | 8.7% | 23 | +2 |
| National | Michael McCormack | 4.5% | 10 | 0 |
| Greens | Richard Di Natale | 10.4% | 1 | 0 |
| Katter's Australian | Bob Katter | 0.5% | 1 | 0 |
| Centre Alliance | None | 0.3% | 1 | 0 |
| Independents | — | 3.4% | 3 | +1 |
This lists parties that won seats. See the complete results below.
Results of the election. The top map shows the first party preference by electorate. The bottom map shows the final two-party preferred vote result by electorate.
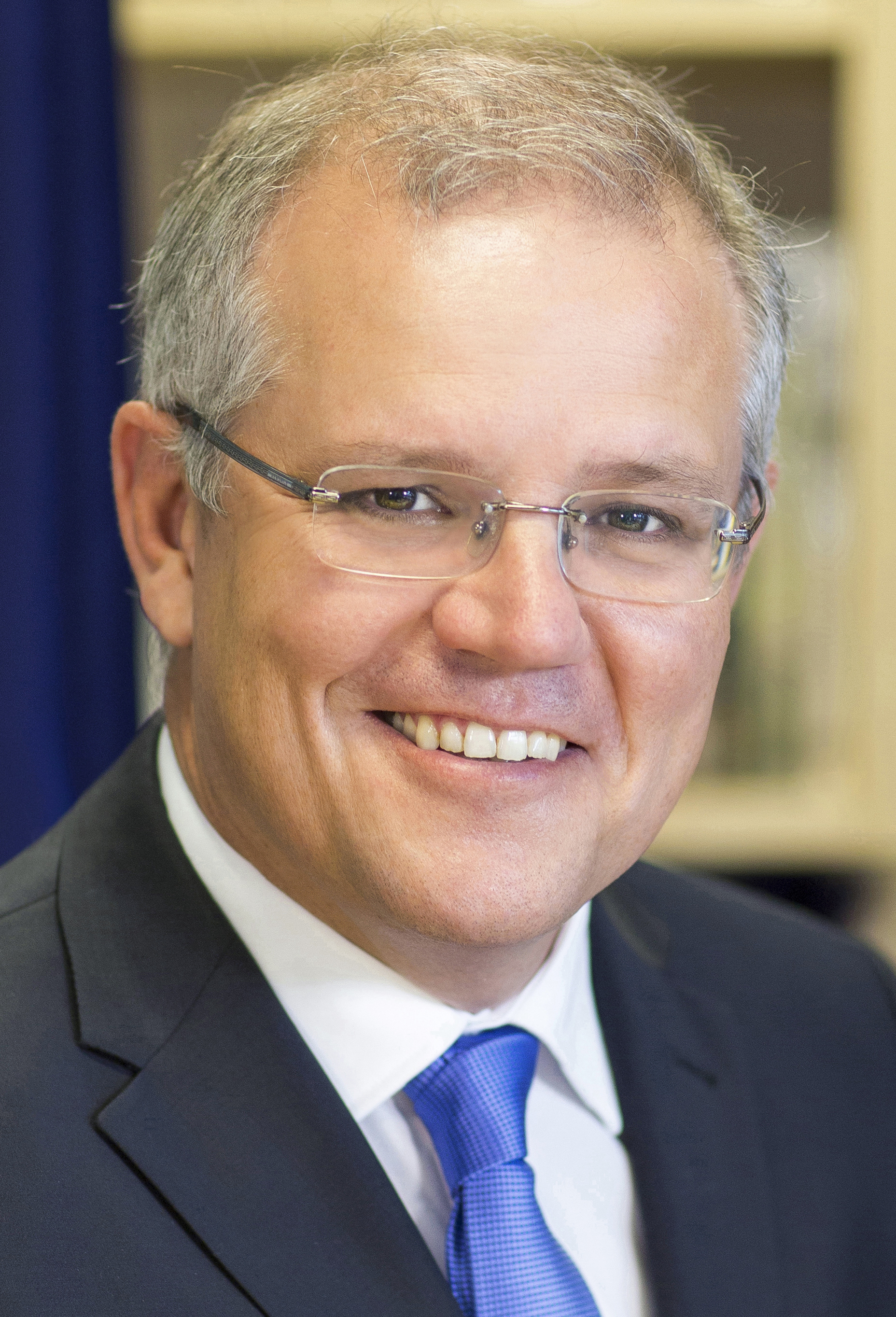

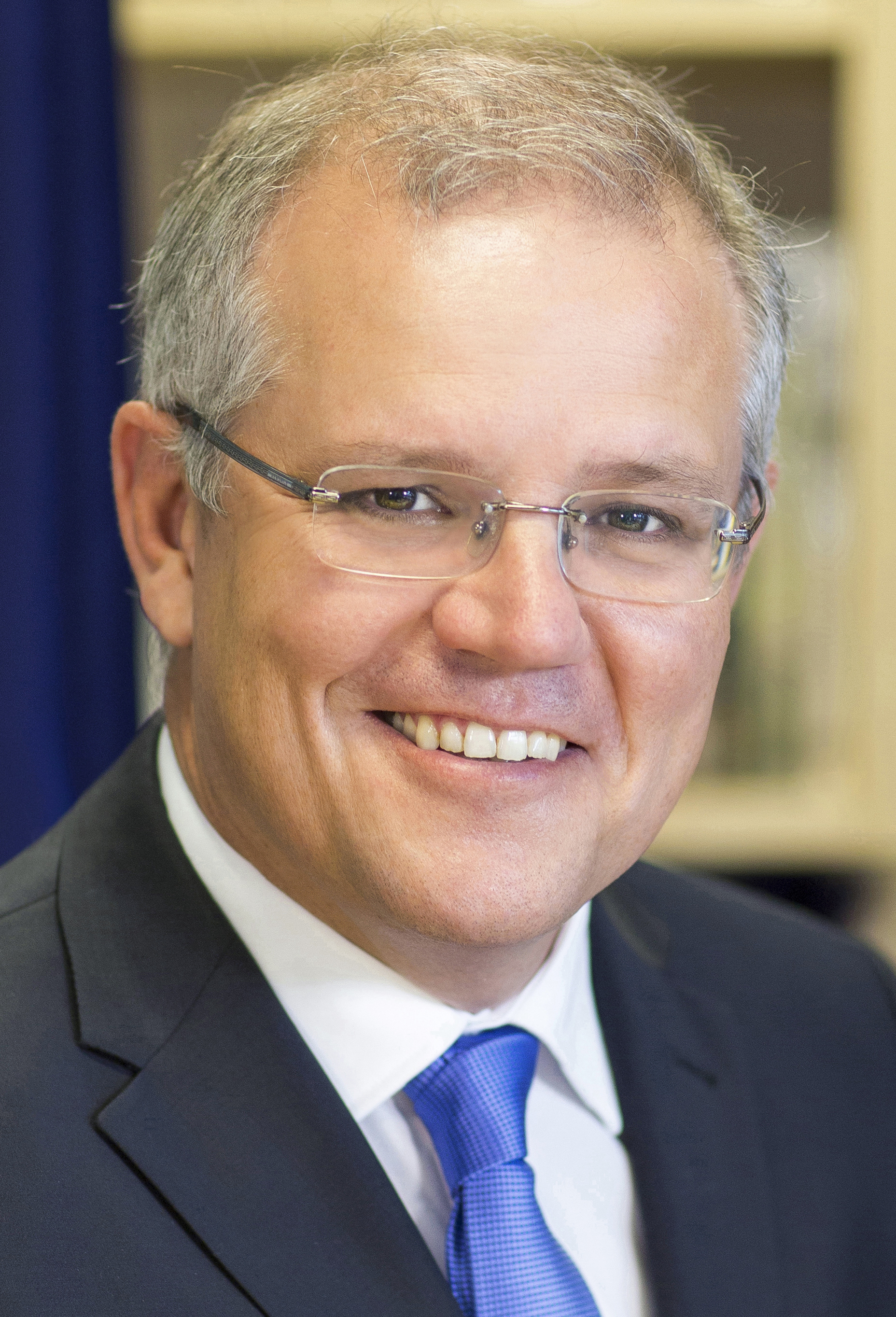
| Prime Minister before | Prime Minister after |
|---|---|
| Scott Morrison; Coalition | Scott Morrison; Coalition |

The state-by-state results in the Australian House of Representatives at the 2019 federal election were: Coalition 77, Labor 68, Australian Greens 1, Centre Alliance 1, Katter's Australian Party 1, and Independents 3.

== Australia ==
House of Representatives (IRV) – Turnout 91.89% (CV)
| Party | Votes | % | Swing (pp) | Seats | Change (seats) |
|---|---|---|---|---|---|
| Liberal/National Coalition | | | | | |
| Liberal Party of Australia | 3,989,404 | 27.99 | −0.68 | 44 | ▼1 |
| Liberal National Party (Qld) | 1,236,401 | 8.67 | +0.15 | 23 | ▲2 |
| National Party of Australia | 642,233 | 4.51 | −0.10 | 10 | Steady |
| Country Liberal Party (NT) | 38,837 | 0.27 | +0.03 | 0 | Steady |
| Coalition total | 5,906,875 | 41.44 | −0.60 | 77 | ▲1 |
| Australian Labor Party | 4,752,160 | 33.34 | −1.39 | 68 | ▼1 |
| Australian Greens | 1,482,923 | 10.40 | +0.17 | 1 | Steady |
| United Australia Party | 488,817 | 3.43 | +3.43 | | |
| Pauline Hanson's One Nation | 438,587 | 3.08 | +1.79 | | |
| Animal Justice Party | 116,675 | 0.82 | +0.12 | | |
| Christian Democratic Party | 97,513 | 0.68 | −0.63 | | |
| Fraser Anning's Conservative National Party | 77,203 | 0.54 | +0.54 | | |
| Katter's Australian Party | 69,736 | 0.49 | −0.05 | 1 | Steady |
| Centre Alliance | 46,931 | 0.33 | −1.52 | 1 | Steady |
| Shooters, Fishers and Farmers Party | 41,479 | 0.29 | +0.18 | | |
| Sustainable Australia | 35,618 | 0.25 | +0.25 | | |
| Liberal Democratic Party | 34,666 | 0.24 | −0.25 | | |
| Derryn Hinch's Justice Party | 26,803 | 0.19 | +0.07 | | |
| Western Australia Party | 25,298 | 0.18 | +0.18 | | |
| Australian Christians | 23,802 | 0.17 | −0.15 | | |
| Democratic Labour Party | 18,287 | 0.13 | +0.11 | | |
| Rise Up Australia Party | 14,032 | 0.10 | −0.41 | | |
| Science Party | 12,617 | 0.09 | −0.02 | | |
| Victorian Socialists | 12,453 | 0.09 | +0.09 | | |
| Reason Party | 8,895 | 0.06 | +0.06 | | |
| Australian Progressives | 7,759 | 0.05 | +0.05 | | |
| Australia First Party | 6,786 | 0.05 | 0.00 | | |
| The Great Australian Party | 5,355 | 0.04 | +0.04 | | |
| Citizens Electoral Council | 3,267 | 0.02 | −0.02 | | |
| Socialist Equality Party | 2,866 | 0.02 | +0.01 | | |
| Socialist Alliance | 2,447 | 0.02 | −0.01 | | |
| Australian Better Families | 2,072 | 0.01 | +0.01 | | |
| Australian Democrats | 2,039 | 0.01 | +0.01 | | |
| Australian Workers Party | 1,676 | 0.01 | +0.01 | | |
| Love Australia or Leave | 1,564 | 0.01 | +0.01 | | |
| Child Protection Party | 1,219 | 0.01 | +0.01 | | |
| Non-Custodial Parents Party (Equal Parenting) | 1,213 | 0.01 | −0.02 | | |
| Involuntary Medication Objectors | 1,179 | 0.01 | +0.01 | | |
| VOTEFLUX | 602 | 0.00 | 0.00 | | |
| Independent | 479,836 | 3.37 | +0.56 | 3 (Note: The independent members were Andrew Wilkie (Clark, Tas), Helen Haines (Indi, Vic) and Zali Steggall (Warringah, NSW).) | ▲1 |
| Non Affiliated | 2,143 | 0.02 | 0.00 | | |
| Total | 14,253,393 | 100.00 | – | 151 | ▲1 |
Two-party-preferred vote
| Liberal/National Coalition | 7,344,813 | 51.53 | +1.17 | | |
| Labor | 6,908,580 | 48.47 | −1.17 | | |
| Invalid/blank votes | 835,223 | 5.54 | +0.49 | | |
| Registered voters/turnout | 16,419,543 | 91.89 | | | |
Source: AEC Tally Room

Popular vote
| Labor | 33.34% |
| Liberal | 27.99% |
| Greens | 10.40% |
| LNP (QLD) | 8.67% |
| National | 4.51% |
| UAP | 3.43% |
| One Nation | 3.08% |
| CLP (NT) | 0.27% |
| Independents | 3.37% |
| Other | 4.94% |

Seats per party
| Labor | 45.03% |
| Liberal | 29.14% |
| LNP (QLD) | 15.23% |
| National | 6.62% |
| Greens | 0.66% |
| Centre Alliance | 0.66% |
| Katter's | 0.66% |
| Independents | 1.99% |

== States ==
=== New South Wales ===
2019 Australian federal election (New South Wales)
| ← 2016 | 18 May 2019 | 2022 → |

All 47 New South Wales seats in the Australian House of Representatives and 6 seats in the Australian Senate
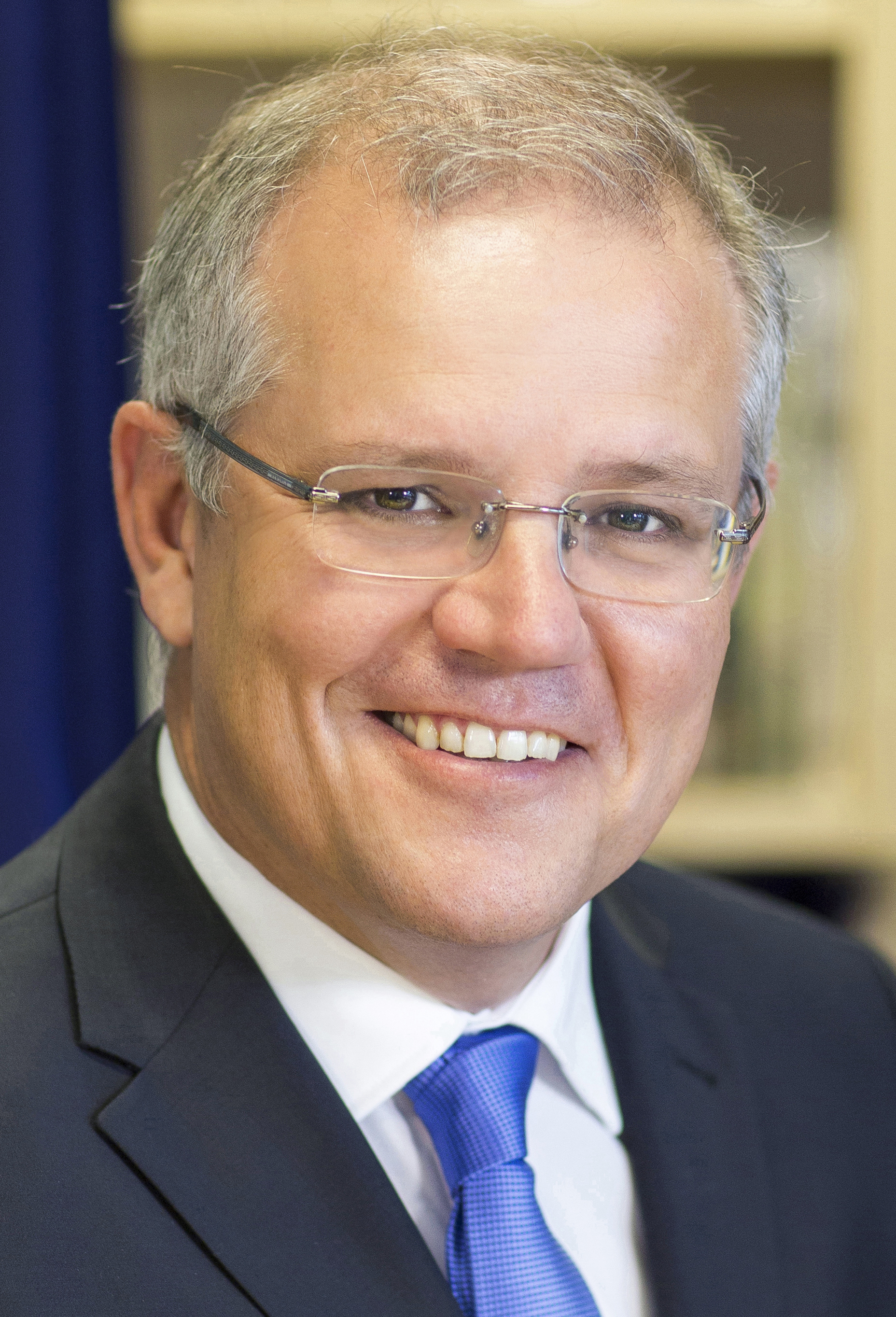

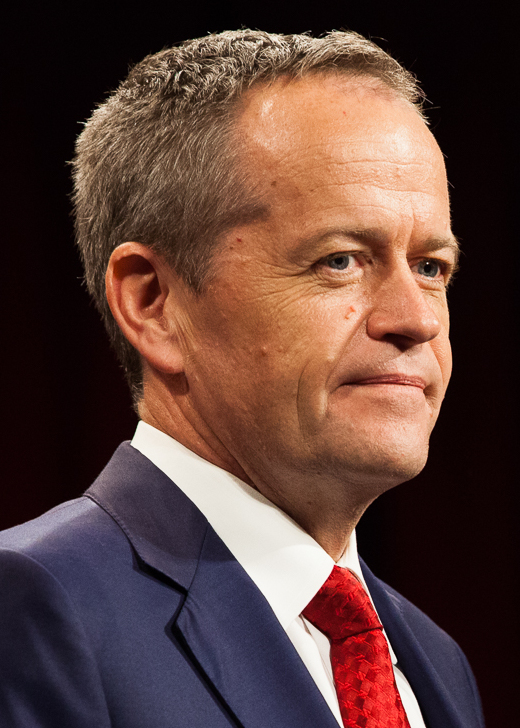
| | First party | Second party |
|---|---|---|
| Leader | Scott Morrison | Bill Shorten |
| Party | Liberal/National coalition | Labor |
| Last election | 23 seats | 24 seats |
| Seats won | 22 seats | 24 seats |
| Seat change | ▼1 | Steady |
| Popular vote | 1,930,426 | 1,568,223 |
| Percentage | 42.54% | 34.56% |
| Swing | ▲0.22 | ▼2.37 |
| TPP | 51.78% | 48.22% |
| TPP swing | ▲1.25 | ▼1.25 |
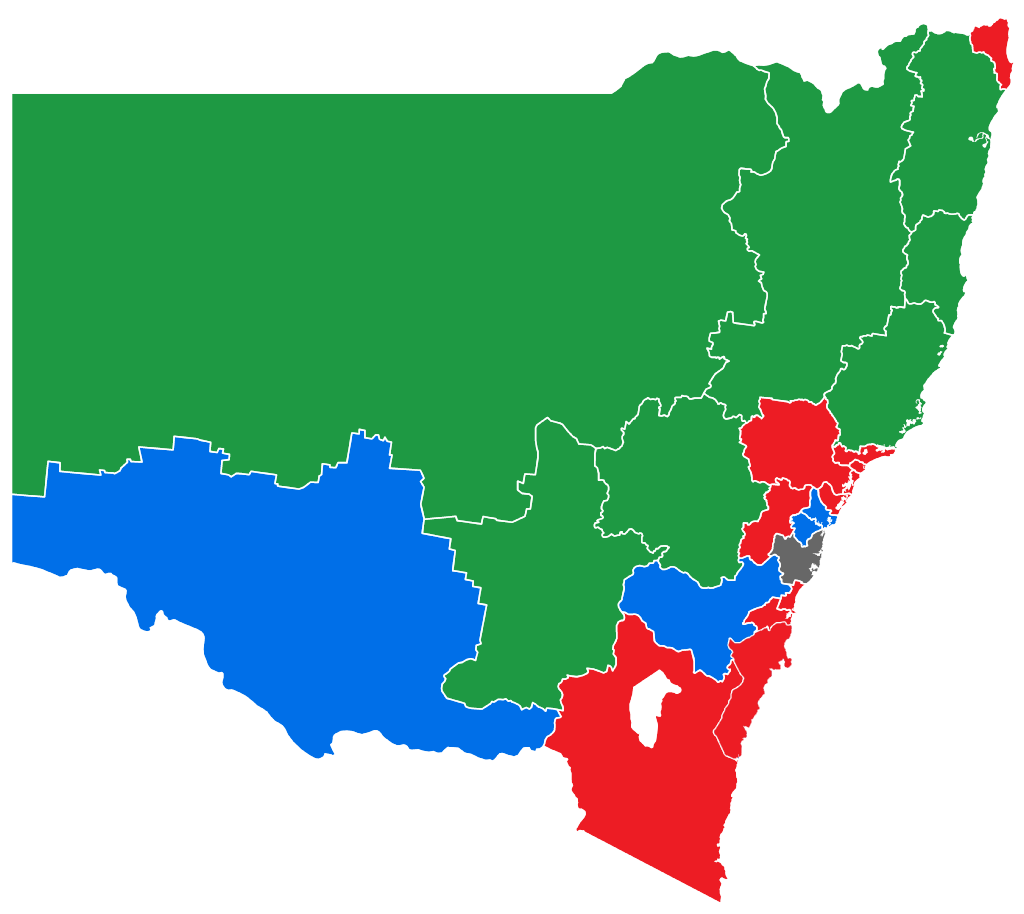
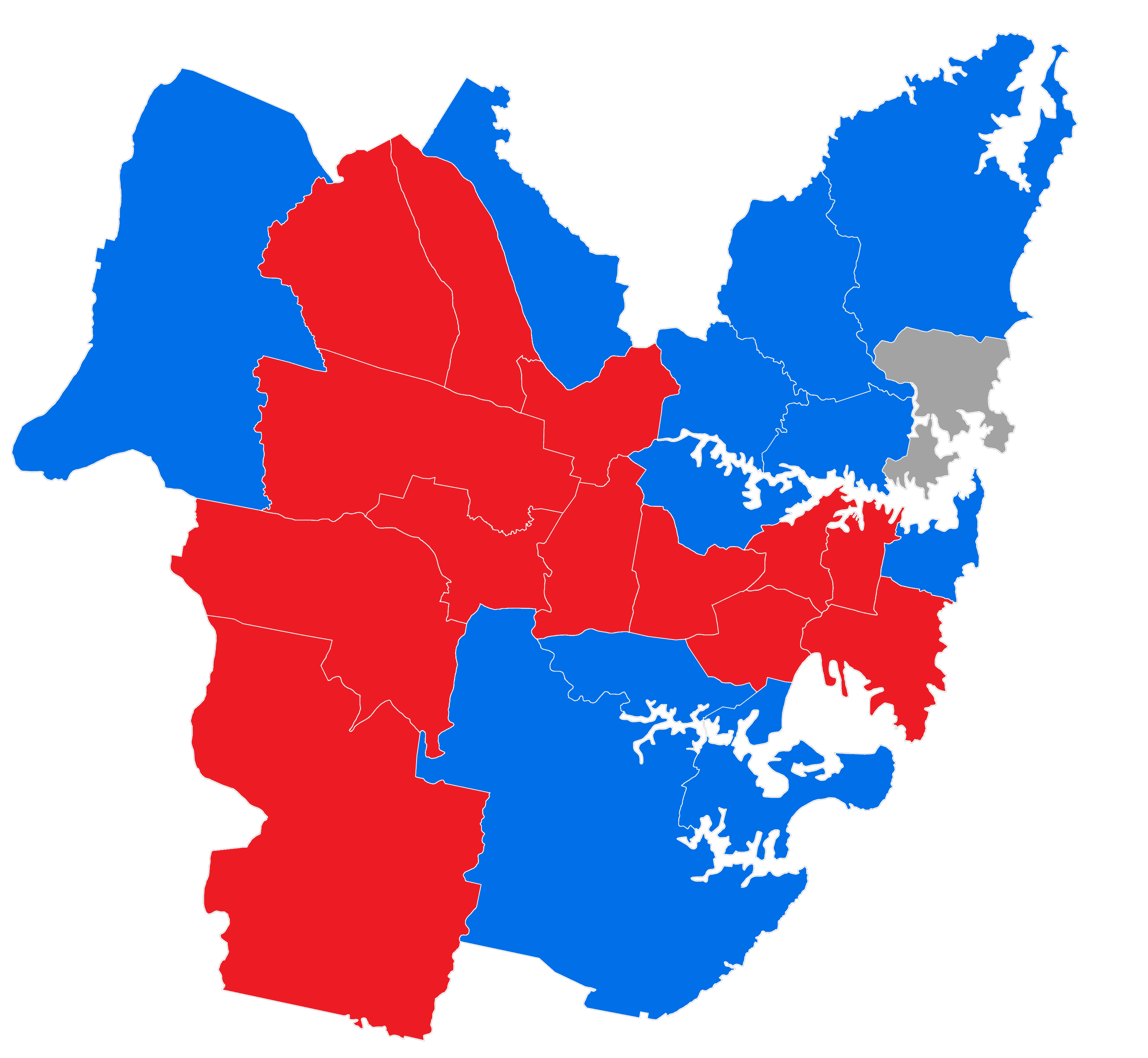

| Party | Votes | % | Swing | Seats | Change |
Liberal/National Coalition
| Liberal Party of Australia | 1,461,560 | 32.21 | −0.47 | 15 | ▼1 |
| National Party of Australia | 468,866 | 10.33 | +0.69 | 7 | Steady |
| Coalition total | 1,930,426 | 42.54 | +0.22 | 22 | ▼1 |
| Australian Labor Party | 1,568,223 | 34.56 | −2.37 | 24 | Steady |
| Australian Greens | 395,238 | 8.71 | −0.24 | | |
| United Australia Party | 153,477 | 3.38 | +3.38 | | |
| Christian Democratic Party | 97,513 | 2.15 | −1.74 | | |
| Pauline Hanson's One Nation | 59,464 | 1.31 | +0.68 | | |
| Animal Justice Party | 29,981 | 0.66 | +0.19 | | |
| Sustainable Australia | 27,399 | 0.60 | +0.59 | | |
| Liberal Democratic Party | 19,291 | 0.43 | −0.03 | | |
| Shooters, Fishers and Farmers Party | 18,129 | 0.40 | +0.32 | | |
| Science Party | 10,791 | 0.24 | −0.10 | | |
| Fraser Anning's Conservative National Party | 7,654 | 0.17 | +0.17 | | |
| Australian Better Families | 2,072 | 0.05 | +0.05 | | |
| Australian Workers Party | 1,676 | 0.04 | +0.04 | | |
| Socialist Equality Party | 1,389 | 0.03 | 0.00 | | |
| Australia First Party | 1,372 | 0.03 | −0.04 | | |
| Non-Custodial Parents Party (Equal Parenting) | 1,213 | 0.03 | −0.05 | | |
| Involuntary Medication Objectors | 1,179 | 0.03 | +0.03 | | |
| The Great Australian Party | 1,086 | 0.02 | +0.02 | | |
| Independent | 209,763 | 4.62 | +0.68 | 1 | ▲1 |
| Total | 4,537,336 | | | 47 | |
Two-party-preferred vote
| Liberal/National Coalition | 2,349,641 | 51.78 | +1.25 | | ▼1 |
| Labor | 2,187,695 | 48.22 | −1.25 | | Steady |
| Invalid/blank votes | 342,051 | 7.01 | +0.84 | | |
| Registered voters/turnout | 5,294,468 | 92.16 | +0.67 | | |
Source: AEC Tally Room

=== Victoria ===
2019 Australian federal election (Victoria)
| ← 2016 | 18 May 2019 | 2022 → |

All 38 Victorian seats in the Australian House of Representatives and 6 seats in the Australian Senate
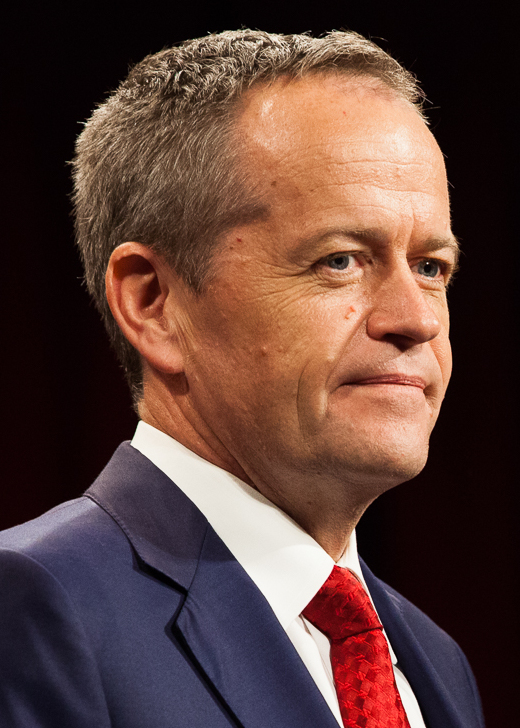

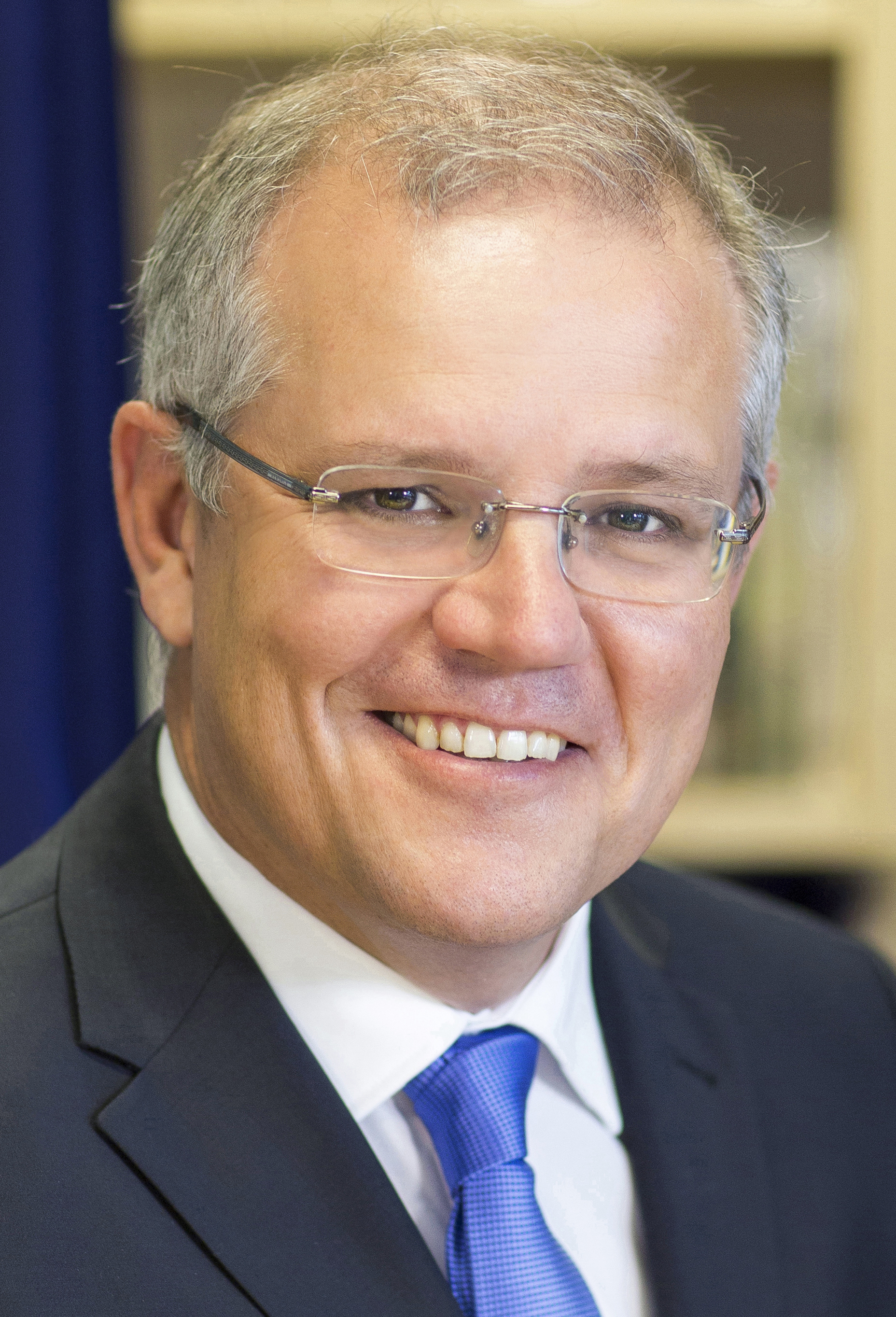

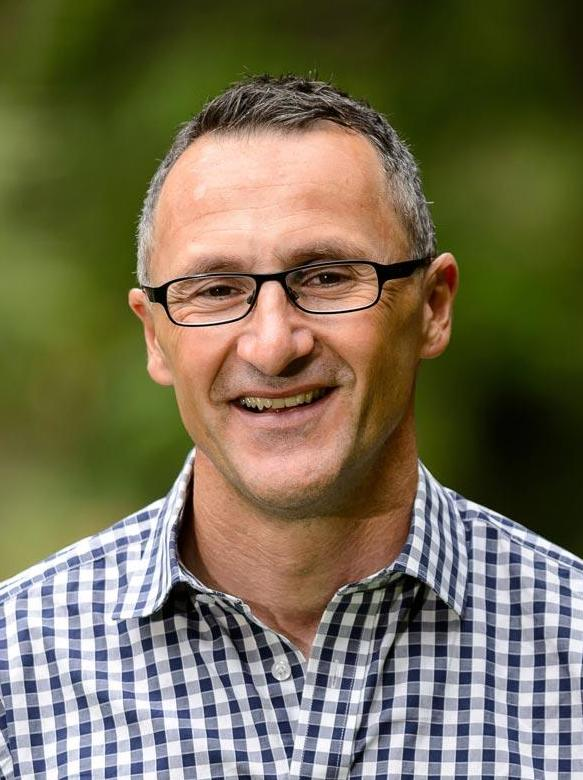
| | First party | Second party | Third party |
|---|---|---|---|
| Leader | Bill Shorten | Scott Morrison | Richard Di Natale |
| Party | Labor | Liberal/National coalition | Greens |
| Last election | 18 seats | 17 seats | 1 seat |
| Seats won | 21 seats | 15 seats | 1 seat |
| Seat change | ▲3 | ▼2 | Steady |
| Popular vote | 1,361,913 | 1,425,542 | 439,169 |
| Percentage | 36.86% | 38.58% | 11.89% |
| Swing | ▲1.28 | ▼3.18 | ▼1.24 |
| TPP | 53.14% | 46.86% |
| TPP swing | ▲1.63 | ▼1.63 |
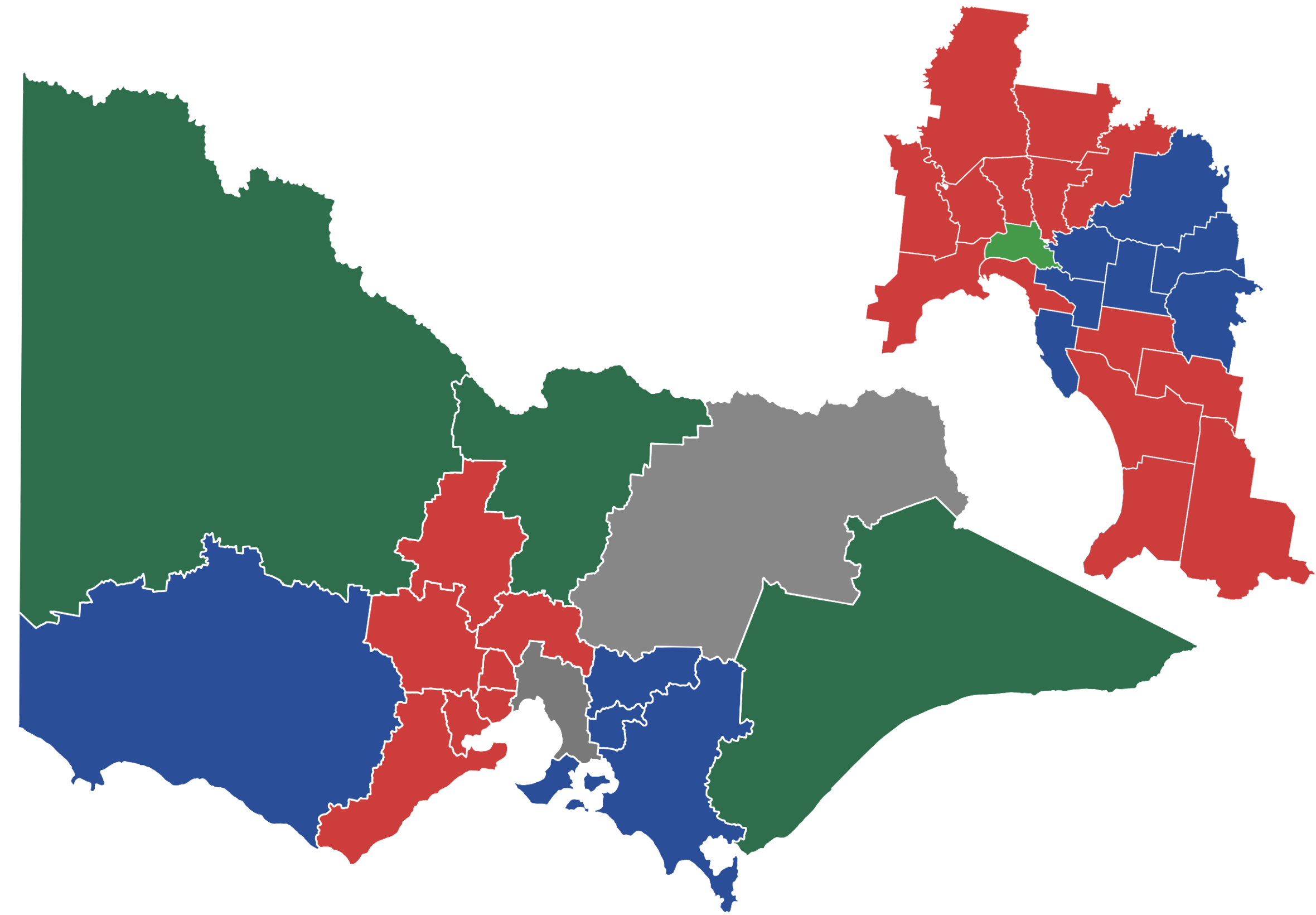
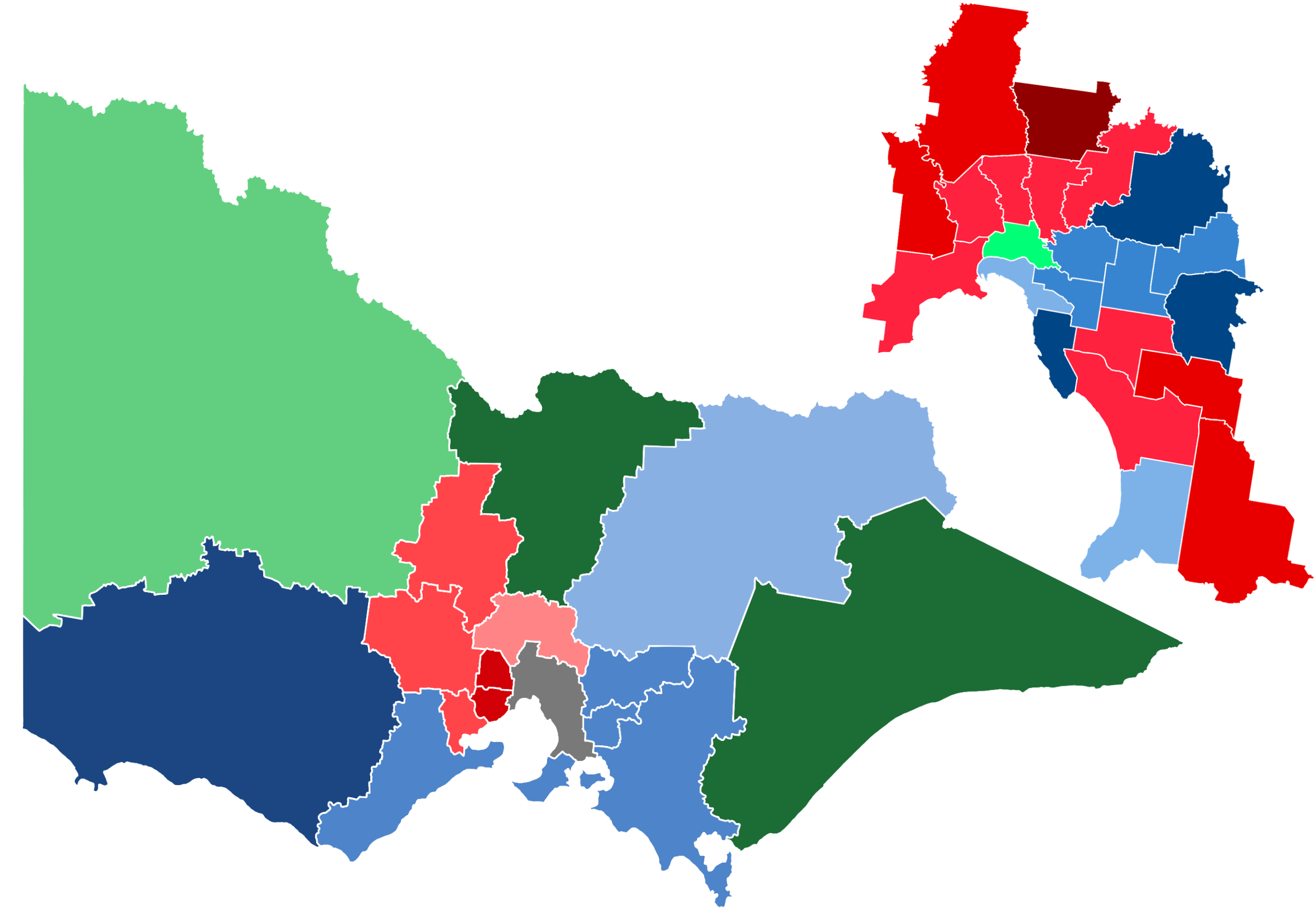
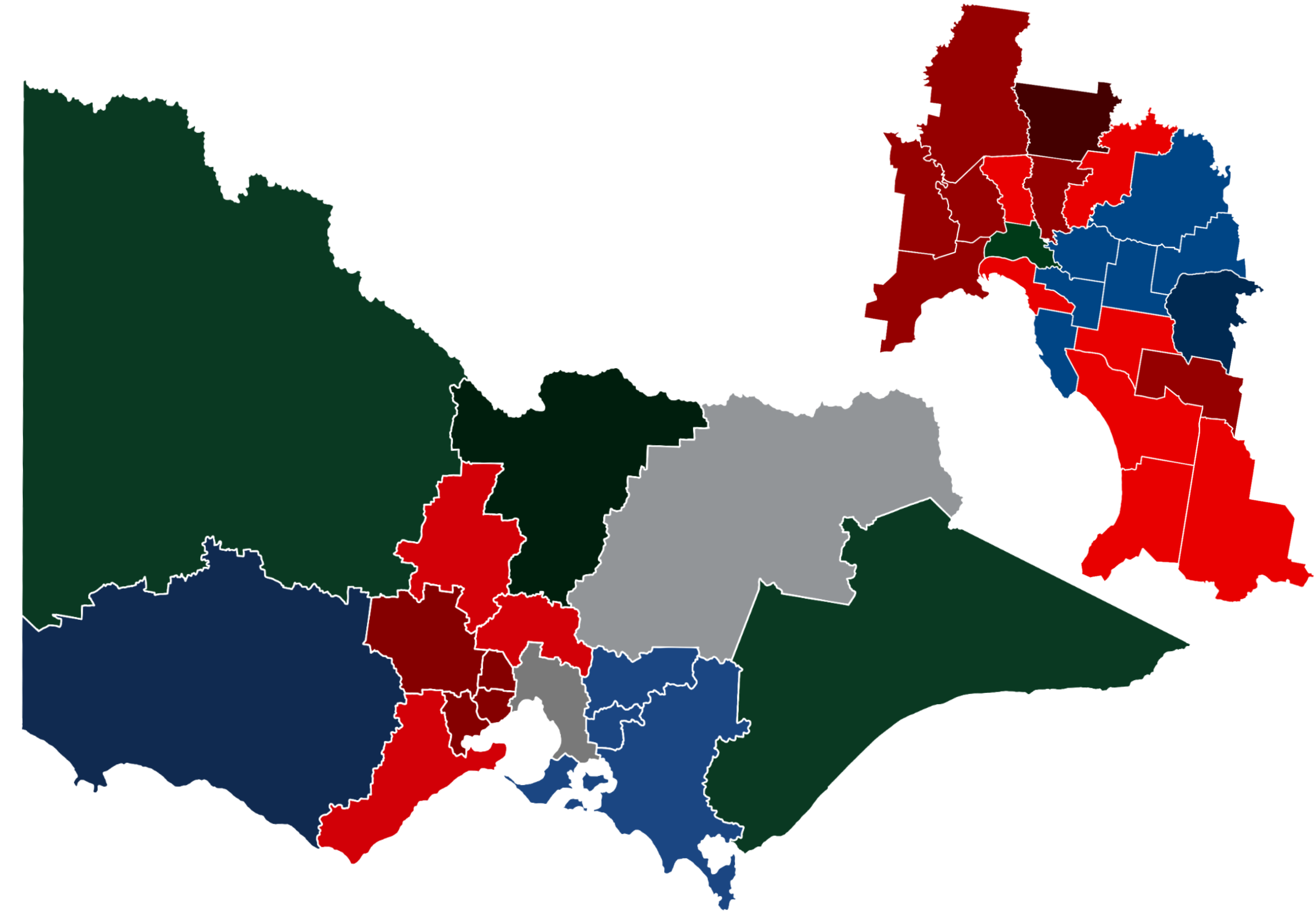

| Party | Votes | % | Swing | Seats | Change |
Liberal/National Coalition
| Liberal Party of Australia | 1,288,805 | 34.88 | −2.13 | 12 | ▼2 |
| National Party of Australia | 136,737 | 3.70 | −1.05 | 3 | Steady |
| Coalition total | 1,425,542 | 38.58 | -3.18 | 15 | ▼2 |
| Australian Labor Party | 1,361,913 | 36.86 | +1.28 | 21 | ▲3 |
| Australian Greens | 439,169 | 11.89 | −1.24 | 1 | Steady |
| United Australia Party | 134,581 | 3.64 | +3.64 | | |
| Animal Justice Party | 41,333 | 1.12 | −0.77 | | |
| Pauline Hanson's One Nation | 35,177 | 0.95 | +0.95 | | |
| Derryn Hinch's Justice Party | 26,803 | 0.73 | +0.33 | | |
| Victorian Socialists | 12,453 | 0.34 | +0.34 | | |
| Shooters, Fishers and Farmers Party | 12,384 | 0.34 | +0.30 | | |
| Fraser Anning's Conservative National Party | 11,504 | 0.31 | +0.31 | | |
| Democratic Labour Party | 11,397 | 0.31 | +0.31 | | |
| Rise Up Australia Party | 10,772 | 0.29 | −0.86 | | |
| Reason Party | 8,895 | 0.24 | +0.24 | | |
| Sustainable Australia | 6,809 | 0.18 | +0.18 | | |
| Australia First Party | 4,094 | 0.11 | +0.02 | | |
| Citizens Electoral Council | 3,267 | 0.09 | +0.03 | | |
| The Great Australian Party | 2,457 | 0.07 | +0.07 | | |
| Socialist Equality Party | 823 | 0.02 | +0.01 | | |
| Science Party | 497 | 0.01 | +0.01 | | |
| Independent | 144,043 | 3.90 | +1.18 | 1 | Steady |
| Non Affiliated | 1,119 | 0.03 | +0.03 | | |
| Total | 3,695,032 | | | 38 | ▲1 |
Two-party-preferred vote
| Labor | 1,963,410 | 53.14 | +1.31 | | |
| Liberal/National Coalition | 1,731,622 | 46.86 | −1.31 | | |
| Invalid/blank votes | 180,426 | 4.66 | −0.11 | | |
| Registered voters/turnout | 4,184,076 | 92.62 | +1.48 | | |
Source: AEC Tally Room

=== Queensland ===
2019 Australian federal election (Queensland)
| ← 2016 | 18 May 2019 | 2022 → |

All 30 Queensland seats in the House of Representatives and 6 seats in the Australian Senate
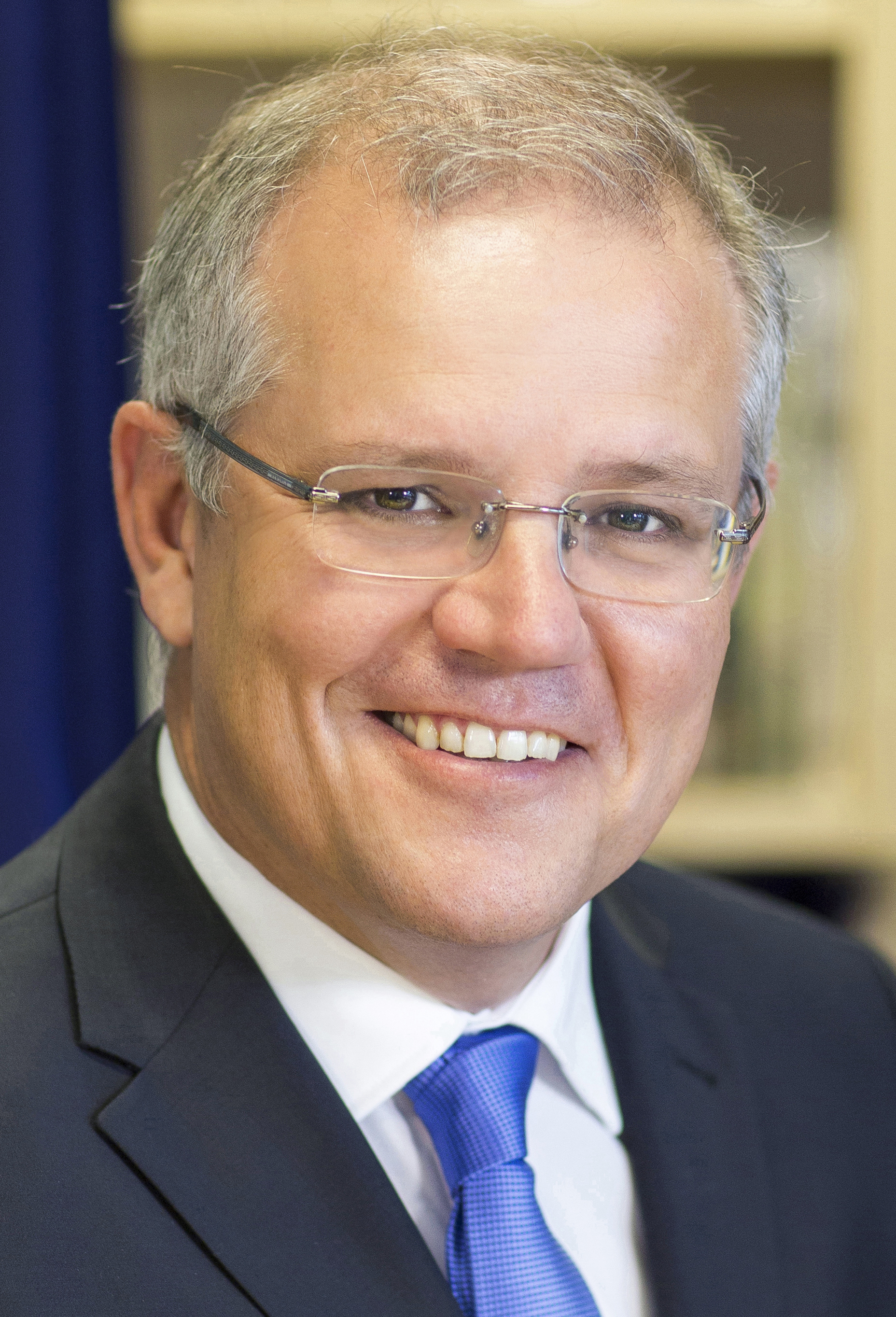

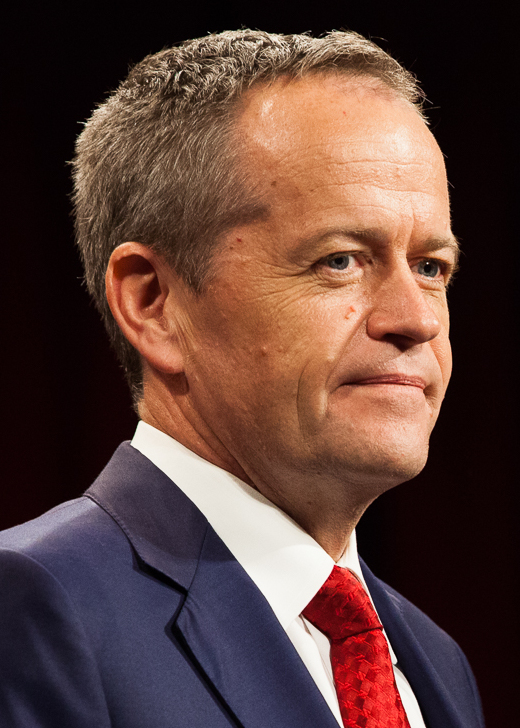

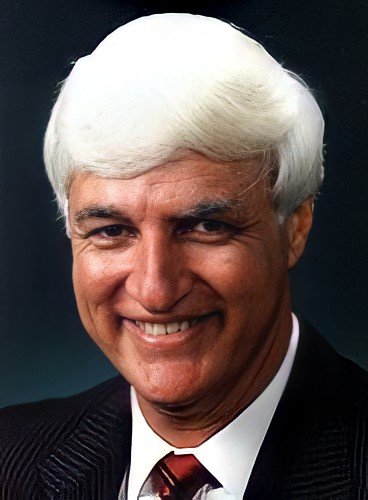
| | First party | Second party | Third party |
|---|---|---|---|
| Leader | Scott Morrison | Bill Shorten | Bob Katter |
| Party | Coalition | Labor | Katter's Australian |
| Leader since | | | 3 June 2011 |
| Leader's seat | | | Kennedy (Qld.) |
| Last election | 21 seats | 8 seats | 1 seat |
| Seats won | 23 seats | 6 seats | 1 seat |
| Seat change | ▲2 | ▼2 | Steady |
| Popular vote | 1,236,401 | 754,792 | 69,736 |
| Percentage | 43.70% | 26.68% | 2.47% |
| Swing | ▲0.51 | ▼4.23 | ▼0.26 |
| TPP | 58.44% | 41.56% |
| TPP swing | ▲4.34 | ▼4.34 |
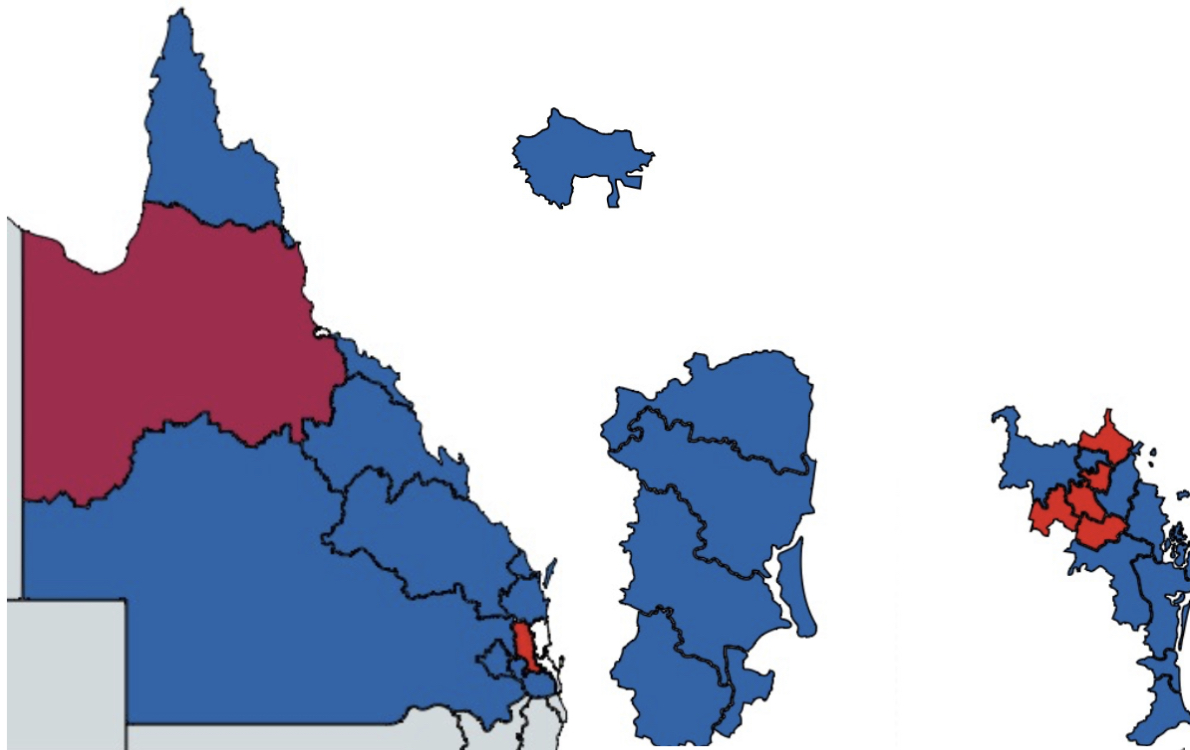
- Results by electorate.

| Party | Votes | % | Swing | Seats | Change |
|---|---|---|---|---|---|
| Liberal National Party | 1,236,401 | 43.70 | +0.51 | 23 | ▲2 |
| Australian Labor Party | 754,792 | 26.68 | −4.23 | 6 | ▼2 |
| Australian Greens | 292,059 | 10.32 | +1.49 | | |
| Pauline Hanson's One Nation | 250,779 | 8.86 | +3.34 | | |
| United Australia Party | 99,329 | 3.51 | +3.51 | | |
| Katter's Australian Party | 69,736 | 2.47 | −0.26 | 1 | Steady |
| Fraser Anning's Conservative National Party | 49,581 | 1.75 | +1.75 | | |
| Liberal Democratic Party | 12,835 | 0.45 | −0.51 | | |
| Animal Justice Party | 12,579 | 0.44 | +0.44 | | |
| Democratic Labour Party | 6,890 | 0.24 | +0.18 | | |
| Love Australia or Leave | 1,564 | 0.06 | +0.06 | | |
| Socialist Alliance | 1,457 | 0.05 | +0.05 | | |
| Sustainable Australia | 1,410 | 0.05 | +0.05 | | |
| Australia First Party | 1,069 | 0.04 | +0.04 | | |
| Australian Progressives | 965 | 0.03 | +0.03 | | |
| Socialist Equality Party | 654 | 0.02 | +0.02 | | |
| Independent | 35,894 | 1.27 | −0.62 | | |
| Non Affiliated | 1,024 | 0.04 | +0.01 | | |
| Total | 2,829,018 | | | 30 | |
Two-party-preferred vote
| Liberal National | 1,653,261 | 58.44 | +4.34 | | ▲2 |
| Labor | 1,175,757 | 41.56 | −4.34 | | ▼2 |
| Invalid/blank votes | 147,290 | 4.95 | +0.25 | – | – |
| Registered voters/turnout | 3,262,898 | 91.22 | +0.05 | – | – |
Source: AEC Tally Room

=== Western Australia ===
2019 Australian federal election (Western Australia)
| ← 2016 | 18 May 2019 | 2022 → |

All 16 Western Australian seats in the Australian House of Representatives and 6 seats in the Australian Senate
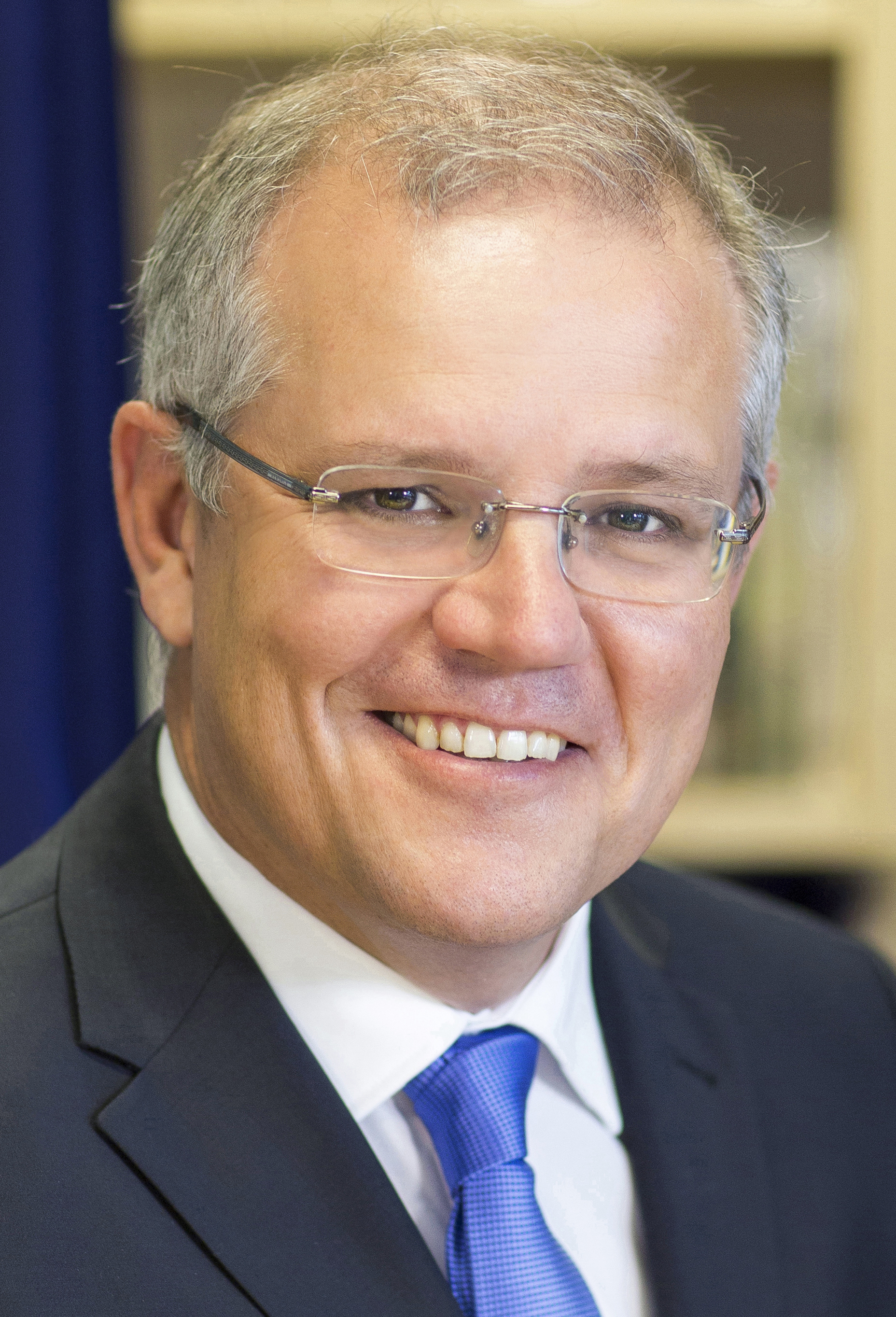

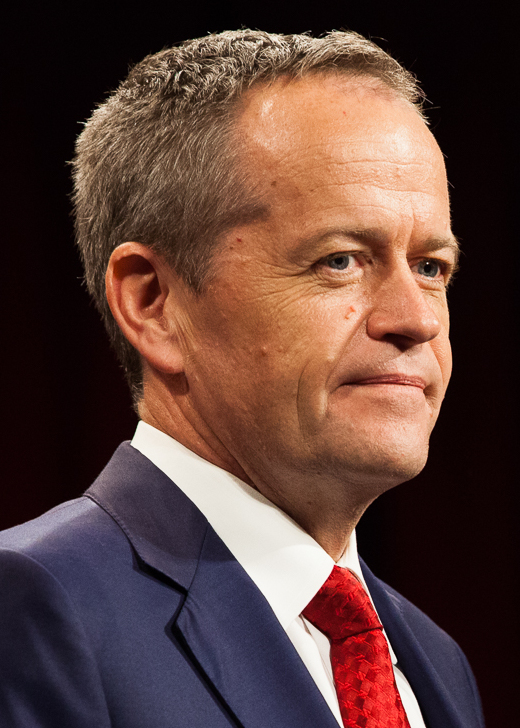
| | First party | Second party |
|---|---|---|
| Leader | Scott Morrison | Bill Shorten |
| Party | Liberal/National coalition | Labor |
| Last election | 11 seats | 5 seats |
| Seats won | 11 seats | 5 seats |
| Seat change | Steady | Steady |
| Popular vote | 633,930 | 417,727 |
| Percentage | 45.22% | 29.80% |
| Swing | ▼3.48 | ▼2.65 |
| TPP | 55.55% | 44.45% |
| TPP swing | ▲0.89 | ▼0.89 |

| Party | Votes | % | Swing | Seats | Change |
Liberal/National Coalition
| Liberal Party of Australia | 613,915 | 43.79 | −1.91 | 11 | Steady |
| National Party of Australia | 20,015 | 1.43 | −1.57 | 0 | Steady |
| Coalition total | 633,930 | 45.22 | -3.48 | 11 | Steady |
| Australian Labor Party | 417,727 | 29.80 | −2.65 | 5 | Steady |
| Australian Greens | 162,876 | 11.62 | −0.44 | | |
| Pauline Hanson's One Nation | 74,478 | 5.31 | +5.31 | | |
| United Australia Party | 28,488 | 2.03 | +2.03 | | |
| Western Australia Party | 25,298 | 1.80 | +1.80 | | |
| Australian Christians | 23,802 | 1.70 | −0.86 | | |
| Shooters, Fishers and Farmers Party | 10,966 | 0.78 | +0.33 | | |
| Fraser Anning's Conservative National Party | 3,575 | 0.26 | +0.26 | | |
| Science Party | 1,329 | 0.09 | +0.09 | | |
| Animal Justice Party | 1,304 | 0.09 | +0.09 | | |
| Socialist Alliance | 990 | 0.07 | −0.03 | | |
| The Great Australian Party | 883 | 0.06 | +0.06 | | |
| VOTEFLUX | 602 | 0.04 | +0.04 | | |
| Australia First Party | 251 | 0.02 | +0.02 | | |
| Independent | 15,375 | 1.10 | −0.20 | | |
| Total | 1,401,874 | | | 16 | |
Two-party-preferred vote
| Liberal/National Coalition | 778,781 | 55.55 | +0.89 | 11 | Steady |
| Labor | 623,093 | 44.45 | −0.89 | 5 | Steady |
| Invalid/blank votes | 80,575 | 5.44 | +1.45 | | |
| Registered voters/turnout | 1,646,262 | 90.05 | +1.67 | | |
Source: AEC Tally Room

=== South Australia ===
2019 Australian federal election (South Australia)
| ← 2016 | 18 May 2019 | 2022 → |

All 10 South Australian seats in the Australian House of Representatives and 6 seats in the Australian Senate
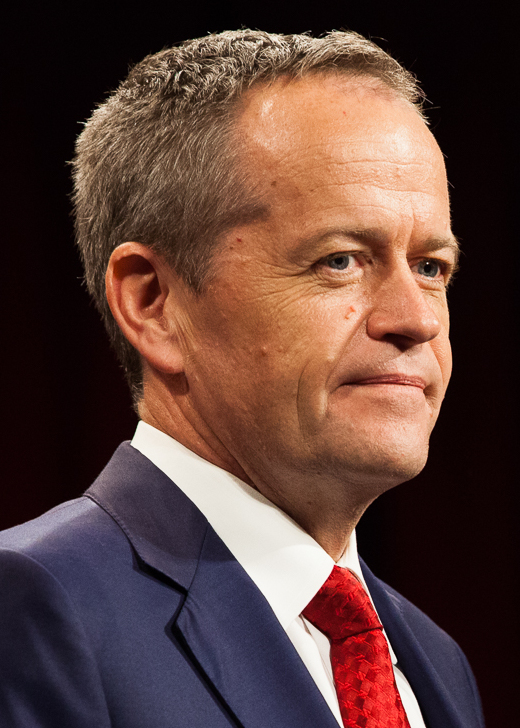

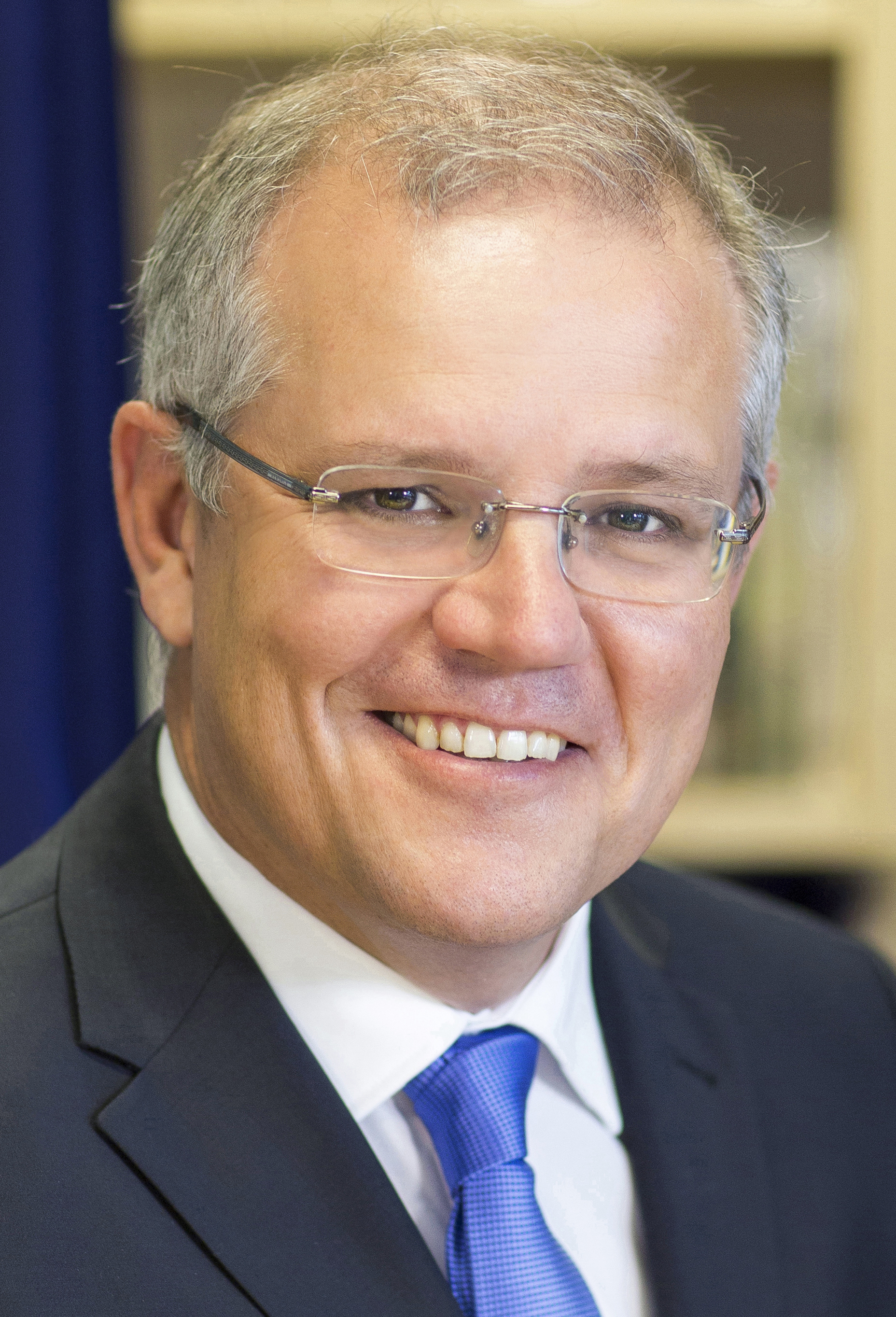

| | First party | Second party | Third party |
|---|---|---|---|
| Leader | Bill Shorten | Scott Morrison | No leader |
| Party | Labor | Liberal/National coalition | Centre Alliance |
| Last election | 6 seats | 4 seats | 1 seat |
| Seats won | 5 seats | 4 seats | 1 seat |
| Seat change | ▼1 | Steady | Steady |
| Popular vote | 379,495 | 438,013 | 46,931 |
| Percentage | 35.38% | 40.83% | 4.38% |
| Swing | ▲3.83 | ▲5.74 | ▼16.88 |
| TPP | 50.71% | 49.29% |
| TPP swing | ▼1.56 | ▲1.56 |

| Party | Votes | % | Swing | Seats | Change |
Liberal/National Coalition
| Liberal Party of Australia | 435,217 | 40.57 | +5.48 | 4 | Steady |
| National Party of Australia | 2,796 | 0.26 | +0.26 | | Steady |
| Coalition total | 438,013 | 40.83 | +5.74 | 4 | Steady |
| Australian Labor Party | 379,495 | 35.38 | +3.83 | 5 | ▼1 |
| Australian Greens | 103,036 | 9.61 | +3.40 | | |
| Centre Alliance | 46,931 | 4.38 | −16.88 | 1 | Steady |
| United Australia Party | 46,007 | 4.29 | +4.29 | | |
| Animal Justice Party | 29,811 | 2.78 | +1.93 | | |
| Pauline Hanson's One Nation | 8,990 | 0.84 | +0.84 | | |
| Fraser Anning's Conservative National Party | 2,920 | 0.27 | +0.27 | | |
| Australian Democrats | 2,039 | 0.19 | +0.19 | | |
| Child Protection Party | 1,219 | 0.11 | +0.11 | | |
| Rise Up Australia Party | 603 | 0.06 | +0.06 | | |
| Australian Progressives | 565 | 0.05 | +0.05 | | |
| Independent | 13,019 | 1.21 | +0.47 | | |
| Total | 1,072,648 | | | 10 | ▼1 |
Two-party-preferred vote
| Labor | 543,898 | 50.71 | −1.56 | 5 | ▼2 |
| Liberal/National Coalition | 528,750 | 49.29 | +1.56 | 4 | ▲1 |
| Invalid/blank votes | 54,202 | 4.81 | +0.63 | | |
| Registered voters/turnout | 1,210,817 | 93.07 | +1.26 | | |
Source: AEC Tally Room

=== Tasmania ===
2019 Australian federal election (Tasmania)
| ← 2016 | 18 May 2019 | 2022 → |

All 5 Tasmanian seats in the Australian House of Representatives and 6 seats in the Australian Senate
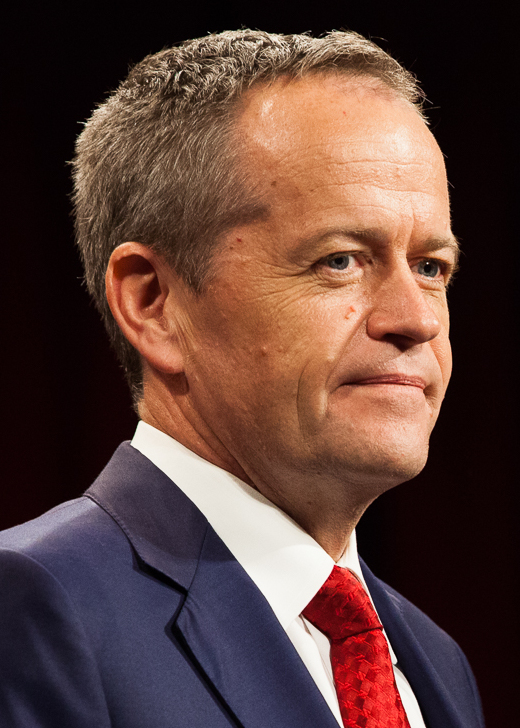

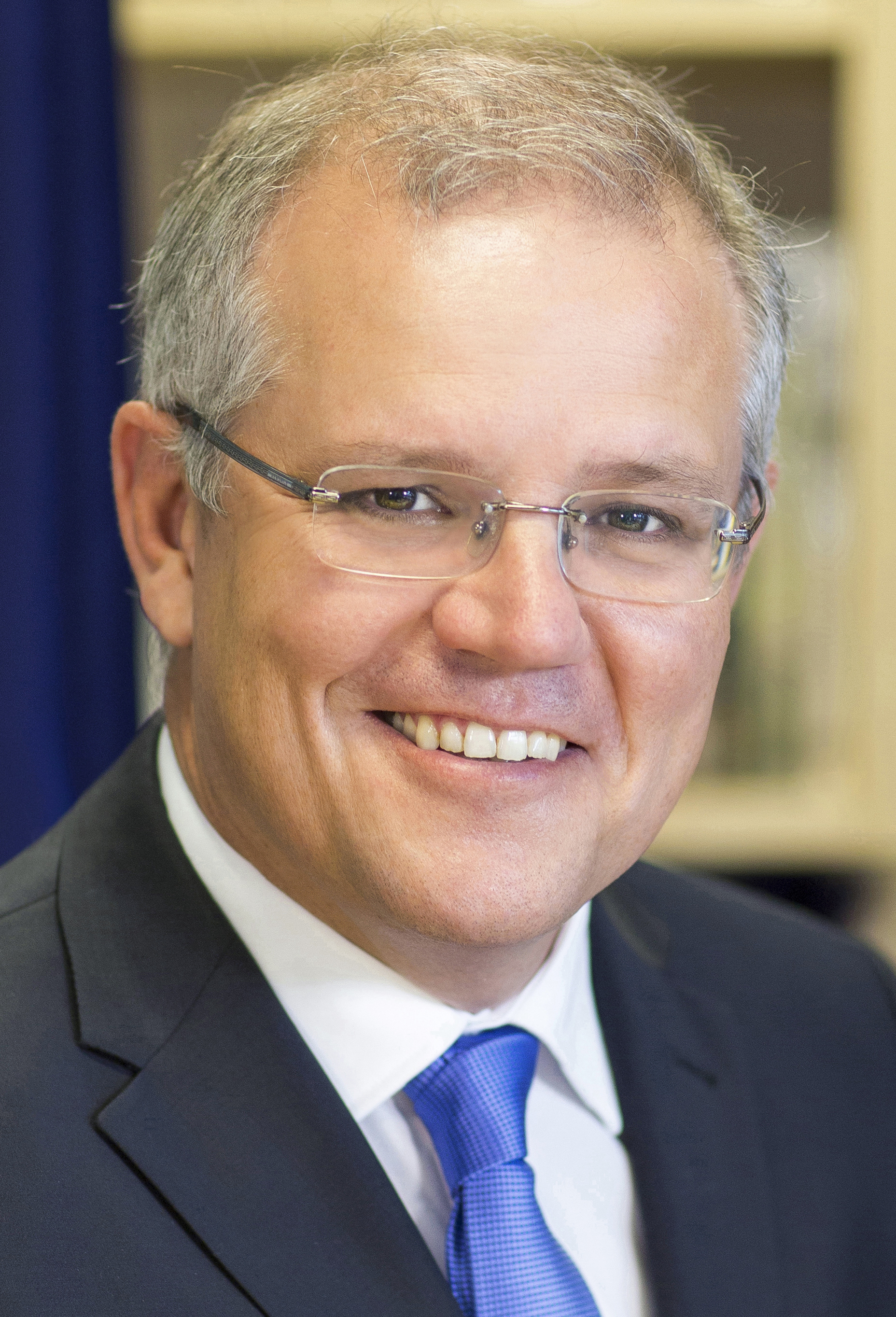
| | First party | Second party |
|---|---|---|
| Leader | Bill Shorten | Scott Morrison |
| Party | Labor | Liberal/National coalition |
| Last election | 4 seats | 0 seats |
| Seats won | 2 seats | 2 seats |
| Seat change | ▼2 | ▲2 |
| Popular vote | 116,955 | 120,415 |
| Percentage | 33.61% | 34.60% |
| Swing | ▼4.29 | ▼0.84 |
| TPP | 55.96% | 44.04% |
| TPP swing | ▼1.40 | ▲1.40 |
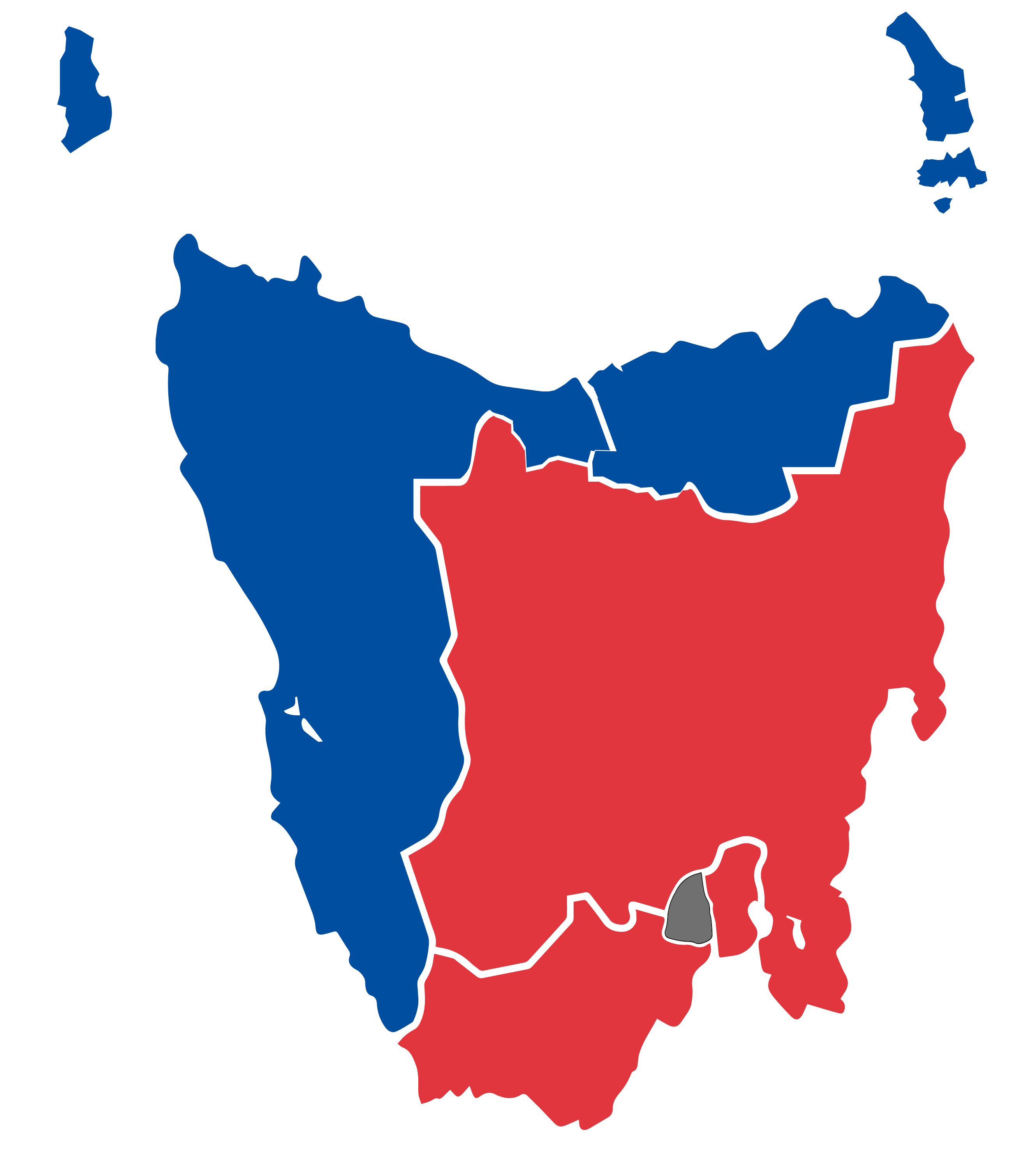
- Results by electorate

| Party | Votes | % | Swing | Seats | Change |
Liberal/National Coalition
| Liberal Party of Australia | 106,596 | 30.63 | −4.81 | 2 | ▲2 |
| National Party of Australia | 13,819 | 3.97 | +3.97 | 0 | Steady |
| Coalition total | 120,415 | 34.60 | -0.84 | 2 | ▲2 |
| Australian Labor Party | 116,955 | 33.61 | −4.29 | 2 | ▼2 |
| Australian Greens | 35,229 | 10.12 | −0.10 | | |
| United Australia Party | 16,868 | 4.85 | +4.85 | | |
| Pauline Hanson's One Nation | 9,699 | 2.79 | +2.79 | | |
| Fraser Anning's Conservative National Party | 1,969 | 0.57 | +0.57 | | |
| Animal Justice Party | 1,667 | 0.48 | +0.48 | | |
| Independent | 45,190 | 12.99 | +4.24 | 1 | Steady |
| Total | 347,992 | | | 5 | |
Two-party-preferred vote
| Labor | 194,746 | 55.96 | −1.40 | | |
| Liberal/National Coalition | 153,246 | 44.04 | +1.40 | | |
| Invalid/blank votes | 15,970 | 4.39 | +0.41 | – | – |
| Registered voters/turnout | 385,816 | 94.34 | +0.75 | – | – |
Source: AEC Tally Room

== Territories ==
=== Australian Capital Territory ===
2019 Australian federal election (Australian Capital Territory)
| ← 2016 | 18 May 2019 | 2022 → |

All 3 Australian Capital Territory seats in the Australian House of Representatives and all 2 seats in the Australian Senate
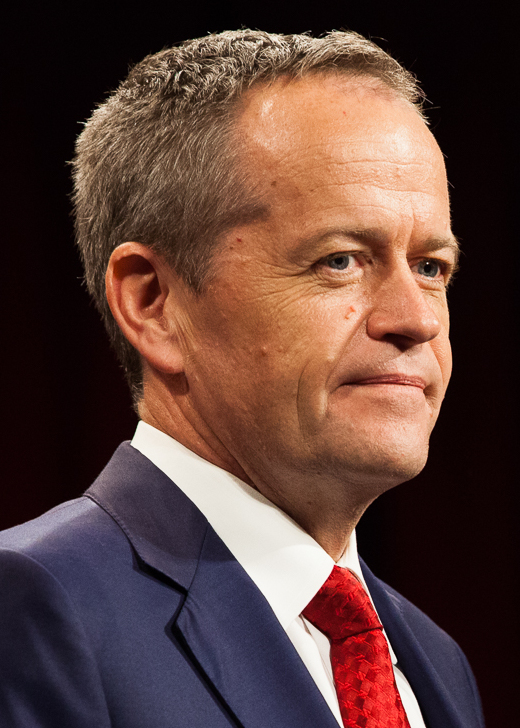

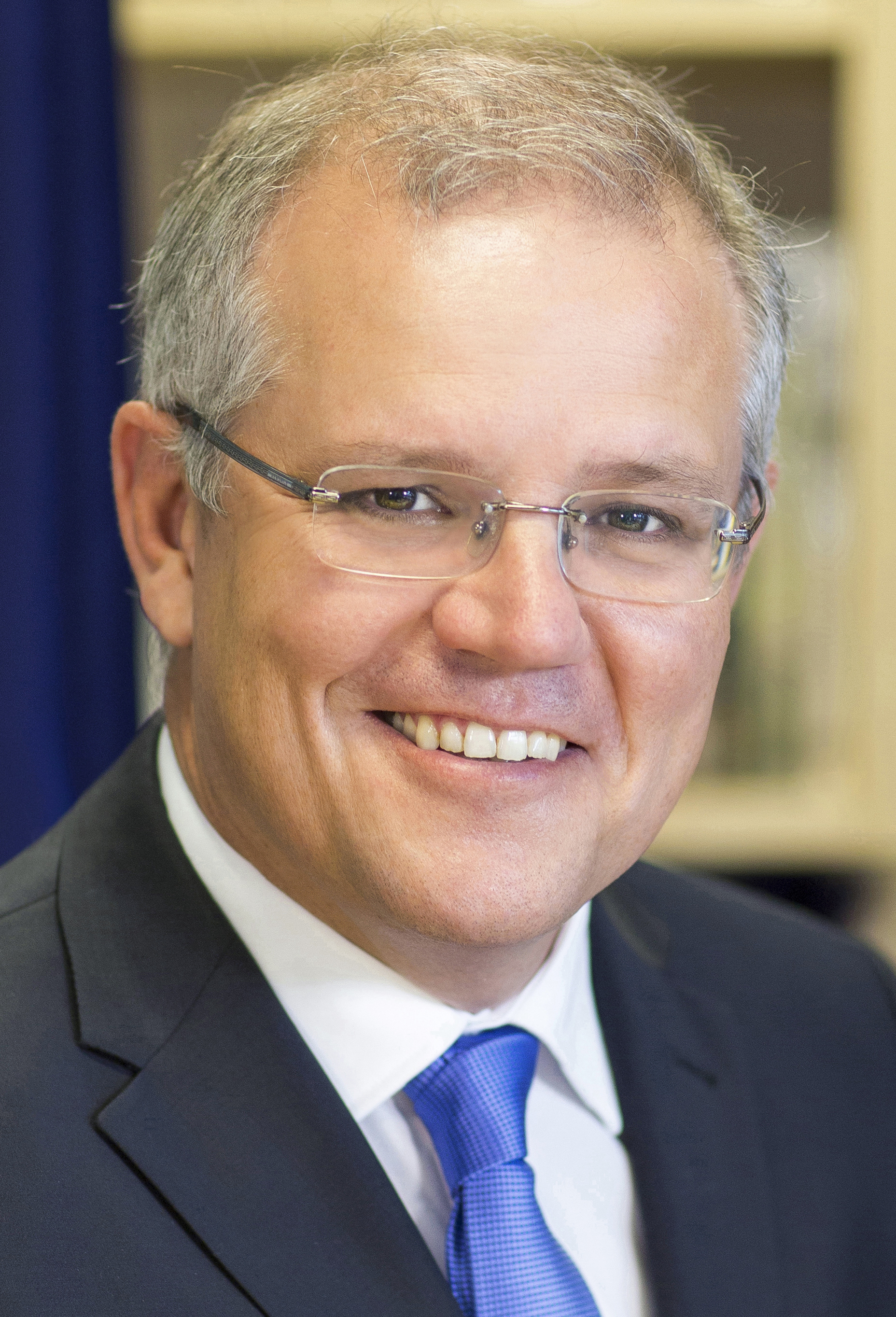
| | First party | Second party |
|---|---|---|
| Leader | Bill Shorten | Scott Morrison |
| Party | Labor | Liberal |
| Last election | 2 seats | 0 seats |
| Seats won | 3 seats | 0 seats |
| Seat change | ▲1 | Steady |
| Popular vote | 109,300 | 83,311 |
| Percentage | 41.09% | 31.32% |
| Swing | ▼3.18 | ▼3.24 |
| TPP | 61.61% | 38.39% |
| TPP swing | ▲0.48 | ▼0.48 |
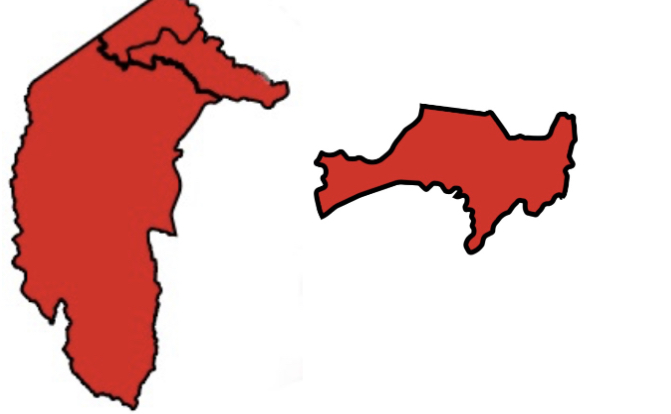
- Results by electorate.

| Party | Votes | % | Swing | Seats | Change |
|---|---|---|---|---|---|
| Australian Labor Party | 109,300 | 41.09 | −3.18 | 3 | ▲1 |
| Liberal Party of Australia | 83,311 | 31.32 | −3.24 | 0 | Steady |
| Australian Greens | 44,804 | 16.85 | +1.76 | | |
| United Australia Party | 7,117 | 2.68 | +2.68 | | |
| Australian Progressives | 6,229 | 2.34 | +2.34 | | |
| Liberal Democratic Party | 2,540 | 0.95 | +0.95 | | |
| The Great Australian Party | 929 | 0.35 | +0.35 | | |
| Independent | 11,745 | 4.42 | +2.56 | | |
| Total | 265,975 | | | 3 | ▲1 |
Two-party-preferred vote
| Labor | 163,878 | 61.61 | +0.48 | | ▲1 |
| Liberal | 102,097 | 38.39 | −0.48 | | Steady |
| Invalid/blank votes | 9,616 | 3.49 | +0.73 | | |
| Registered voters/turnout | 295,847 | 93.15 | +0.99 | | |
Source: AEC Tally Room

=== Northern Territory ===
2019 Australian federal election (Northern Territory)
| ← 2016 | 18 May 2019 | 2022 → |

All 2 Northern Territory seats in the Australian House of Representatives and all 2 seats in the Australian Senate
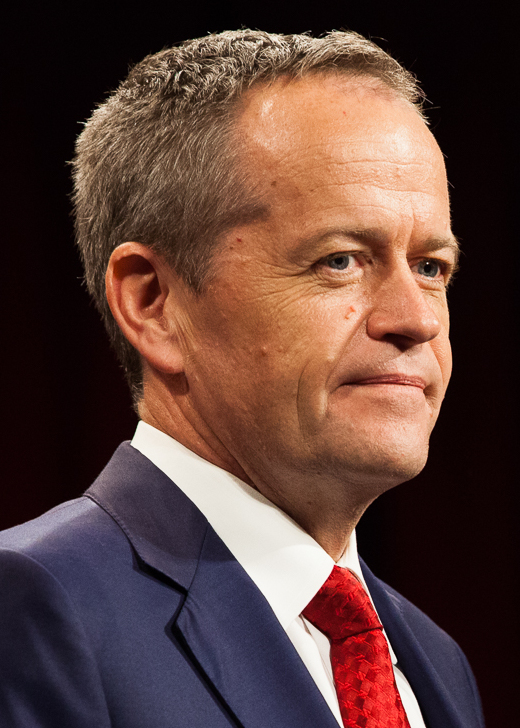

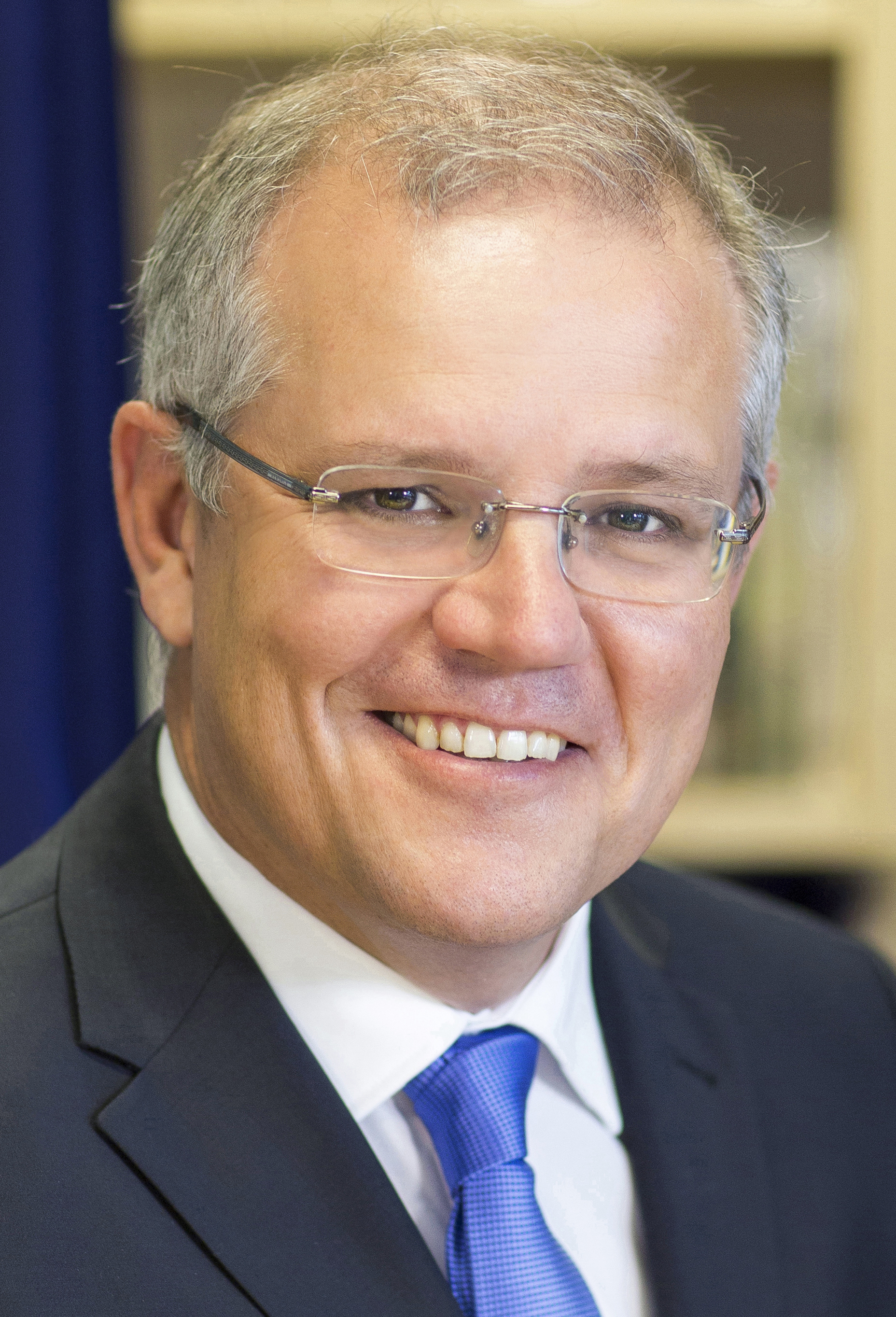
| | First party | Second party |
|---|---|---|
| Leader | Bill Shorten | Scott Morrison |
| Party | Labor | Coalition |
| Last election | 2 seats | 0 seats |
| Seats won | 2 seats | 0 seats |
| Seat change | Steady | Steady |
| Popular vote | 43,755 | 38,837 |
| Percentage | 42.27% | 37.52% |
| Swing | ▲1.88 | ▲4.27 |
| TPP | 54.20% | 45.80% |
| TPP swing | ▼2.86 | ▲2.86 |
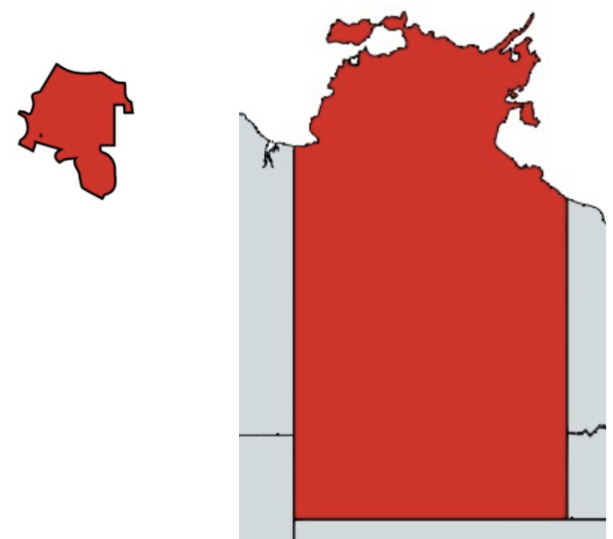
- Results by electorate.

| Party | Votes | % | Swing | Seats | Change |
|---|---|---|---|---|---|
| Australian Labor Party | 43,755 | 42.27 | +1.88 | 2 | Steady |
| Country Liberal Party | 38,837 | 37.52 | +4.27 | 0 | Steady |
| Australian Greens | 10,512 | 10.15 | +1.06 | | |
| United Australia Party | 2,950 | 2.85 | +2.85 | | |
| Rise Up Australia Party | 2,657 | 2.57 | +0.02 | | |
| Independent | 4,807 | 4.64 | −1.24 | | |
| Total | 103,518 | | | 2 | |
Two-party-preferred vote
| Australian Labor Party | 56,103 | 54.20 | −2.86 | 2 | Steady |
| Country Liberal Party | 47,415 | 45.80 | +2.86 | 0 | Steady |
| Invalid/blank votes | 5,093 | 4.69 | −2.66 | | |
| Registered voters/turnout | 139,359 | 77.94 | −1.07 | | |
Source: AEC Tally Room

== Two party preferred preference flow ==
House of Representatives (IRV – Turnout 89.82% (CV)
| Party | Liberal/National Coalition | | | Labor Party | | |
| Party | Votes | % | ± | Votes | % | ± |
|---|---|---|---|---|---|---|
| Greens | 263,830 | 17.79% | –0.27 | 1,219,093 | 82.21% | +0.27 |
| One Nation | 286,049 | 65.22% | +14.75 | 152,538 | 34.78% | –14.75 |
| United Australia | 318,413 | 65.14% | +28.0 | 170,404 | 34.86% | –28.0 |
| Liberal Democrats | 26,776 | 77.24% | +7.13 | 7,890 | 22.76% | –7.13 |
| Christian Democrats | 72,575 | 74.43% | +1.23 | 24,938 | 25.57% | –1.23 |
| Conservative Nationals | 55,437 | 71.81% | – | 21,766 | 28.19% | – |
| Democratic Labour | 7,271 | 39.76% | +4.01 | 11,016 | 60.24% | –4.01 |
| Rise Up Australia | 8,481 | 60.44% | +7.47 | 5,551 | 39.56% | –7.47 |
| Australia First | 3,830 | 56.44% | +10.60 | 2,956 | 43.56% | –10.60 |
| Love Australia or Leave | 852 | 54.48% | – | 712 | 45.52% | – |
| Animal Justice Party | 44,824 | 38.42% | +1.17 | 71,851 | 61.58% | –1.17 |
| Federation | | | | | | |
| Katter's Australian | 46,754 | 67.04% | +14.00 | 22,982 | 32.96% | –14.00 |
| Centre Alliance | 15,438 | 32.90% | | 31,493 | 67.10% | |
| Western Australia | 12,390 | 48.98% | – | 12,908 | 51.02% | – |
| The Great Australian | 2,842 | 53.07% | – | 2,513 | 46.93% | – |
| Victorian Socialists | 1,546 | 12.41% | – | 10,907 | 87.59% | – |
| Informed Medical Options | 429 | 36.39% | – | 750 | 63.61% | – |
| Australian Christians | 19,229 | 80.79% | +8.52 | 4,573 | 19.21% | –8.52 |
| Shooters, Fishers and Farmers | 24,498 | 59.06% | +13.25 | 16,981 | 40.94% | –13.25 |
| Fusion | 4,105 | 32.54% | – | 8,512 | 67.46% | – |
| Socialist Alliance | 495 | 20.23% | –5.72 | 1,952 | 79.77% | +5.72 |
| Justice | 12,393 | 46.24% | –2.77 | 14,410 | 53.76% | +2.77 |
| Australian Citizens | 863 | 26.42% | –26.04 | 2,404 | 73.58% | +26.04 |
| Sustainable Australia | 16,389 | 46.01% | –5.48 | 19,229 | 53.99% | +5.48 |
| Reason | 2,776 | 31.21% | +0.00 | 6,119 | 68.79% | +0.00 |
| Australian Progressives | 2,543 | 32.77% | – | 5,216 | 67.23% | – |
| Australian Democrats | 631 | 30.95% | – | 1,408 | 69.05% | – |
| Independents | 194,826 | 40.60% | +0.00 | 285,010 | 59.40% | +0.00 |
| Total | 14,659,042 | 100.00 | | | 151 | Steady |
Two-party-preferred vote
| Liberal/National Coalition | 7,344,813 | 51.53% | +1.17 | | | |
| Labor | 7,642,161 | 48.47% | –1.17 | | | |
| Invalid/blank votes | 802,376 | 5.19 | –0.35 | – | – | – |
| Turnout | 15,461,418 | 89.82 | –2.07 | – | – | – |
| Registered voters | 17,213,433 | – | – | – | – | – |
Source: AEC for both votes

== Maps ==
=== Results by electoral division ===
First preference vote

Two-candidate-preferred vote

=== Results by state and territory ===
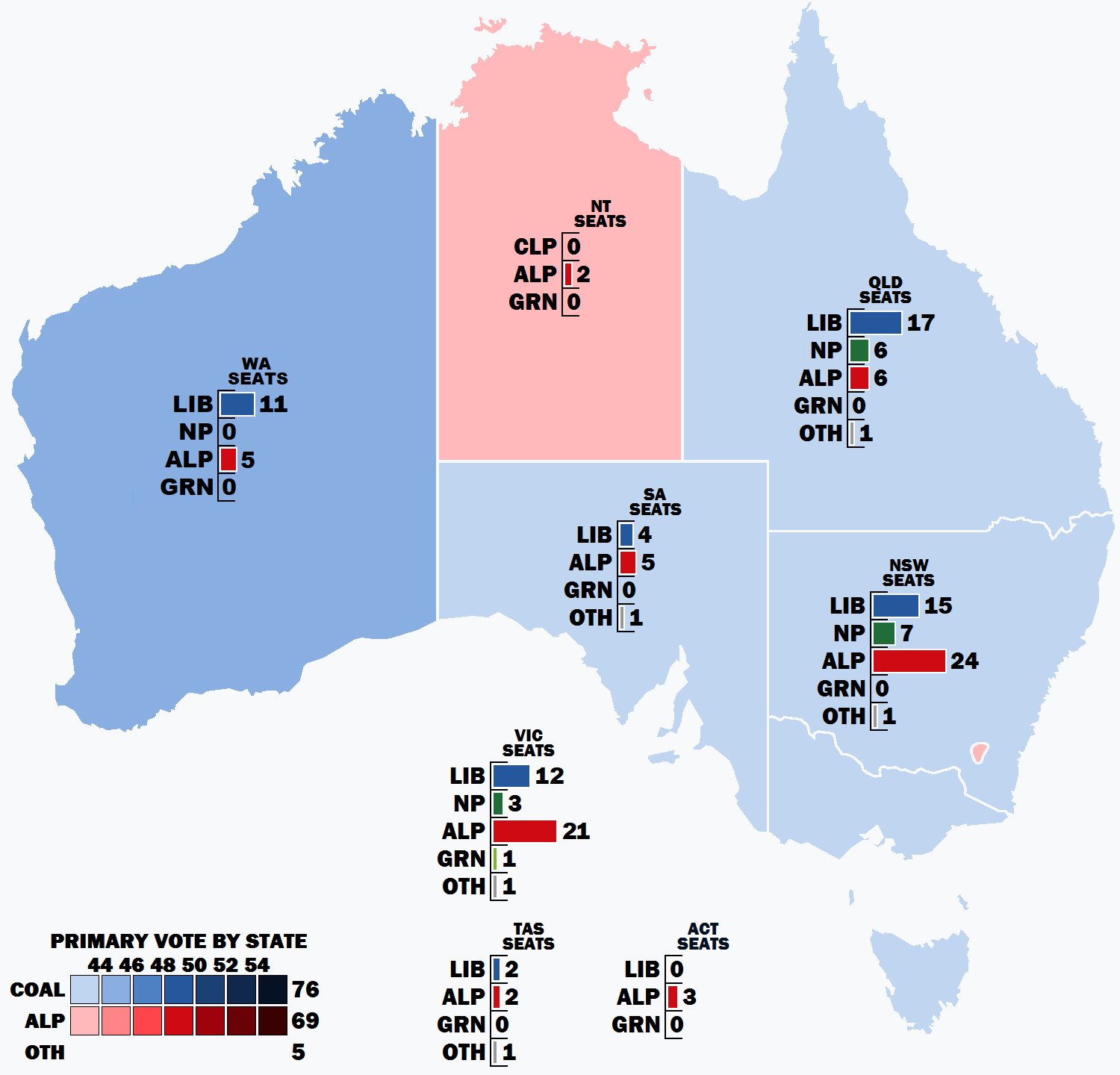
First preference vote and seat totals
