= Results of the 2022 Australian federal election in territories =

Federal election results in territories of Australia

This is a list of division results for the 2022 Australian federal election in the Australian Capital Territory and the Northern Territory.

This election was held using Instant-runoff voting. In this election, in the Australian Capital Territory (ACT) and the Northern Territory, there were no "turn-overs." In each district, the candidate leading in the first count took the seat, either in the first count or in the end.

== Australian Capital Territory ==
2022 Australian federal election (Australian Capital Territory)
| ← 2019 | 21 May 2022 | 2025 → |

All 3 Australian Capital Territory seats in the Australian House of Representatives and all 2 seats in the Australian Senate
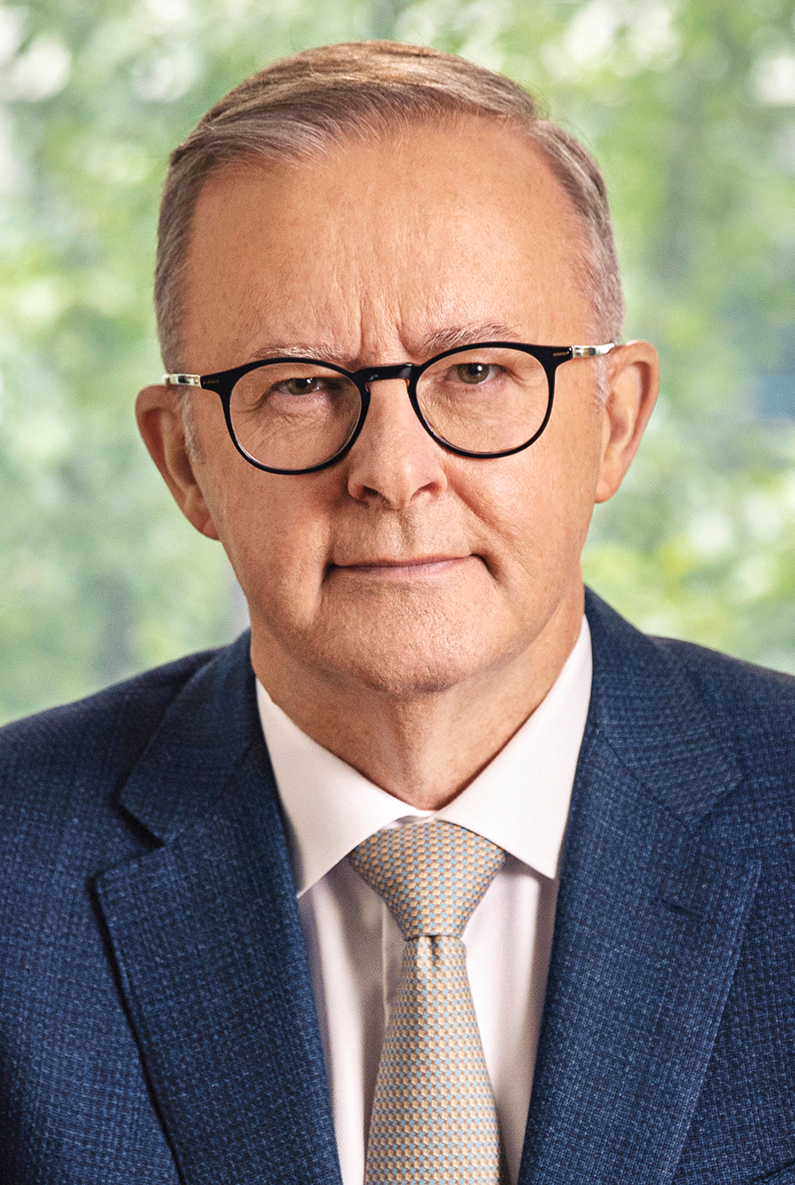

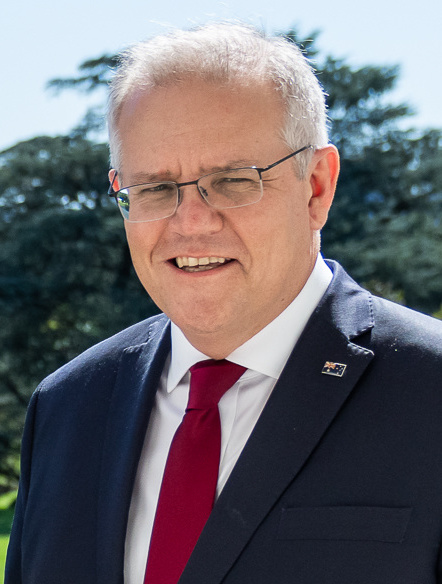
| | First party | Second party |
|---|---|---|
| Leader | Anthony Albanese | Scott Morrison |
| Party | Labor | Liberal |
| Last election | 3 seats | 0 seats |
| Seats won | 3 seats | 0 seats |
| Seat change | Steady | Steady |
| Popular vote | 126,595 | 74,759 |
| Percentage | 44.89% | 26.51% |
| Swing | ▲3.80 | ▼4.81 |
| TPP | 66.95% | 33.05% |
| TPP swing | ▲5.34 | ▼5.34 |
- Results by division for the House of Representatives, shaded by winning party's margin of victory.

=== Overall results ===
House of Representatives (IRV) – Turnout 92.07% (CV)
| Party | Votes | % | Swing (pp) | Seats | Change (seats) |
|---|---|---|---|---|---|
| Australian Labor Party | 126,595 | 44.89 | +3.80 | 3 | Steady |
| Liberal Party of Australia | 74,759 | 26.51 | −4.81 | 0 | Steady |
| Australian Greens | 52,648 | 18.67 | +1.82 | 0 | Steady |
| United Australia Party | 6,864 | 2.43 | −0.25 | 0 | Steady |
| Pauline Hanson's One Nation | 6,630 | 2.35 | +2.35 | 0 | Steady |
| Liberal Democratic Party | 1,706 | 0.60 | –0.35 | 0 | Steady |
| Independent | 12,795 | 4.54 | +0.12 | 0 | Steady |
| Total | 281,997 | 100.00 | | 3 | Steady |
| Invalid/blank votes | 7,116 | 2.46 | −1.03 | – | – |
| Turnout | 289,113 | 92.07 | –1.08 | – | – |
| Registered voters | 314,025 | – | – | – | – |
Two-party-preferred vote
| Labor | 188,799 | 66.95 | +5.34 | – | – |
| Liberal | 93,198 | 33.05 | –5.34 | – | – |
Source: AEC for both votes and seats

=== Results by division ===
==== Bean ====
2022 Australian federal election: Bean
| Party | Candidate | Votes | % | ±% |
|---|---|---|---|---|
| Labor | David Smith | 41,060 | 41.73 | +3.59 |
| Liberal | Jane Hiatt | 29,241 | 29.72 | −1.72 |
| Greens | Kathryn Savery | 14,559 | 14.80 | +1.71 |
| Independent | Jamie Christie | 8,023 | 8.15 | −0.12 |
| United Australia | Sean Conway | 2,831 | 2.88 | +0.48 |
| One Nation | Benjamin Ambard | 2,680 | 2.72 | +2.72 |
| Total formal votes | | 98,394 | 97.12 | +2.27 |
| Informal votes | | 2,915 | 2.88 | −2.27 |
| Turnout | | 101,309 | 92.58 | −1.20 |
Two-party-preferred result
| Labor | David Smith | 61,935 | 62.95 | +5.43 |
| Liberal | Jane Hiatt | 36,459 | 37.05 | −5.43 |
| Labor hold | | Swing | +5.43 | |

Alluvial diagram for preference flows in the seat of Bean in the 2022 federal election. indicates at what stage the winning candidate had over 50% of the votes and was declared the winner.

==== Canberra ====
2022 Australian federal election: Canberra
| Party | Candidate | Votes | % | ±% |
|---|---|---|---|---|
| Labor | Alicia Payne | 41,435 | 44.88 | +4.38 |
| Greens | Tim Hollo | 22,795 | 24.69 | +1.38 |
| Liberal | Slade Minson | 20,102 | 21.77 | −6.08 |
| Independent | Tim Bohm | 4,772 | 5.17 | +0.47 |
| United Australia | Catherine Smith | 1,687 | 1.83 | +0.25 |
| One Nation | James Miles | 1,531 | 1.66 | +1.66 |
| Total formal votes | | 92,322 | 98.23 | +0.39 |
| Informal votes | | 1,668 | 1.77 | −0.39 |
| Turnout | | 93,990 | 92.08 | −0.54 |
Notional two-party-preferred count
| Labor | Alicia Payne | 66,898 | 72.46 | +5.38 |
| Liberal | Slade Minson | 25,424 | 27.54 | −5.38 |
Two-candidate-preferred result
| Labor | Alicia Payne | 57,421 | 62.20 | −4.89 |
| Greens | Tim Hollo | 34,901 | 37.80 | +37.80 |
| Labor hold | | | | |

Alluvial diagram for preference flows in the seat of Canberra in the 2022 federal election. indicates at what stage the winning candidate had over 50% of the votes and was declared the winner.

==== Fenner ====
2022 Australian federal election: Fenner
| Party | Candidate | Votes | % | ±% |
|---|---|---|---|---|
| Labor | Andrew Leigh | 44,100 | 48.31 | +3.45 |
| Liberal | Nathan Kuster | 25,416 | 27.84 | −6.82 |
| Greens | Natasa Sojic | 15,294 | 16.75 | +2.33 |
| One Nation | Lucia Grant | 2,419 | 2.65 | +2.65 |
| United Australia | Timothy Elton | 2,346 | 2.57 | −1.50 |
| Liberal Democrats | Guy Jakeman | 1,706 | 1.87 | +1.87 |
| Total formal votes | | 91,281 | 97.30 | +0.29 |
| Informal votes | | 2,533 | 2.70 | −0.29 |
| Turnout | | 93,814 | 91.51 | −1.50 |
Two-party-preferred result
| Labor | Andrew Leigh | 59,966 | 65.69 | +5.13 |
| Liberal | Nathan Kuster | 31,315 | 34.31 | −5.13 |
| Labor hold | | Swing | +5.13 | |

Alluvial diagram for preference flows in the seat of Fenner in the 2022 federal election. indicates at what stage the winning candidate had over 50% of the votes and was declared the winner.

== Northern Territory ==
2022 Australian federal election (Northern Territory)
| ← 2019 | 21 May 2022 |

All 2 Northern Territory seats in the Australian House of Representatives and all 2 seats in the Australian Senate
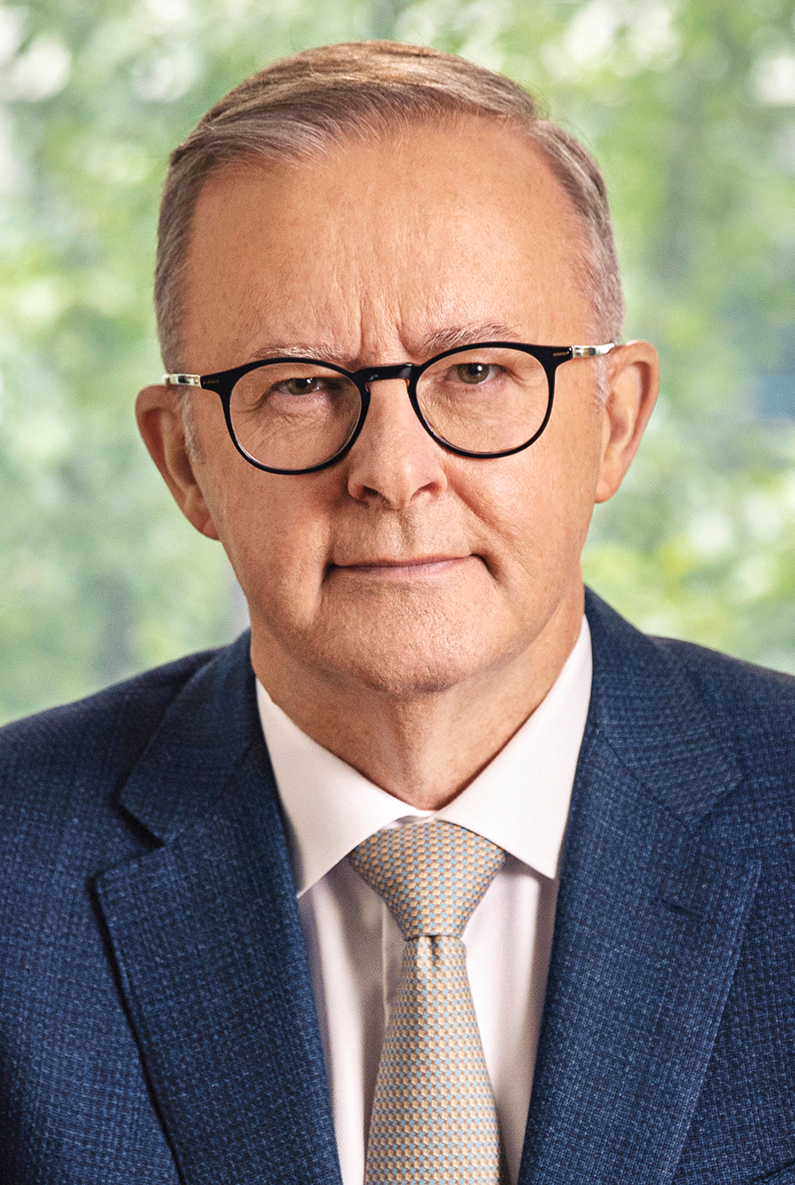

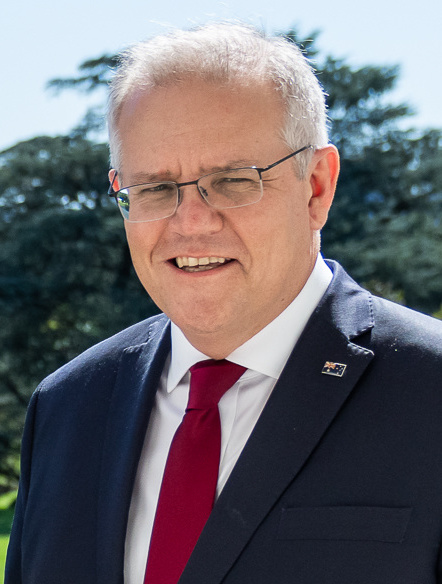
| | First party | Second party |
|---|---|---|
| Leader | Anthony Albanese | Scott Morrison |
| Party | Labor | Coalition |
| Last election | 2 seats | 0 seats |
| Seats won | 2 | 0 |
| Seat change | Steady | Steady |
| Popular vote | 38,522 | 29,664 |
| Percentage | 38.16% | 29.39% |
| Swing | ▼4.11 | ▼8.13 |
| TPP | 55.54% | 44.46% |
| TPP swing | ▲1.34 | ▼1.34 |
- Results by division for the House of Representatives, shaded by winning party's margin of victory.

=== Overall results ===
House of Representatives (IRV) – Turnout 73.08% (CV)
| Party | Votes | % | Swing (pp) | Seats | Change (seats) |
|---|---|---|---|---|---|
| Australian Labor Party | 38,522 | 38.16 | −4.11 | 2 | Steady |
| Country Liberal Party | 29,664 | 29.39 | −8.13 | 0 | Steady |
| Australian Greens | 13,182 | 13.06 | +2.91 | 0 | Steady |
| Liberal Democratic Party | 7,787 | 7.71 | +7.71 | 0 | Steady |
| Pauline Hanson's One Nation | 5,418 | 5.37 | +5.37 | 0 | Steady |
| United Australia Party | 4,510 | 4.47 | +1.62 | 0 | Steady |
| Australian Citizens Party | 497 | 0.49 | +0.49 | 0 | Steady |
| Independent | 1,357 | 1.34 | −3.30 | 0 | Steady |
| Total | 100,937 | 100.00 | | 2 | Steady |
| Invalid/blank votes | 5,658 | 5.31 | +0.62 | – | – |
| Turnout | 106,595 | 73.08 | –4.86 | – | – |
| Registered voters | 145,851 | – | – | – | – |
Two-party-preferred vote
| Labor | 56,065 | 55.54 | +1.34 | – | – |
| Liberal | 44,872 | 44.46 | –1.34 | – | – |
Source: AEC for both votes and seats

=== Results by division ===
==== Lingiari ====
2022 Australian federal election: Lingiari
| Party | Candidate | Votes | % | ±% |
|---|---|---|---|---|
| Labor | Marion Scrymgour | 16,747 | 36.56 | −8.24 |
| Country Liberal | Damien Ryan | 15,893 | 34.69 | −2.22 |
| Greens | Blair McFarland | 5,018 | 10.95 | +2.71 |
| One Nation | Tim Gallard | 2,470 | 5.39 | +5.39 |
| Liberal Democrats | George Kasparek | 1,948 | 4.25 | +4.25 |
| United Australia | Allan McLeod | 1,882 | 4.11 | +1.29 |
| Independent | Michael Gravener | 948 | 2.07 | +2.07 |
| Citizens | Thong Sum Lee | 497 | 1.08 | +1.08 |
| Independent | Imelda Adamson Agars | 409 | 0.89 | +0.89 |
| Total formal votes | | 45,812 | 92.63 | −2.32 |
| Informal votes | | 3,647 | 7.37 | +2.32 |
| Turnout | | 49,459 | 66.83 | −6.02 |
Two-party-preferred result
| Labor | Marion Scrymgour | 23,339 | 50.95 | −4.51 |
| Country Liberal | Damien Ryan | 22,473 | 49.05 | +4.51 |
| Labor hold | | Swing | −4.51 | |

Alluvial diagram for preference flows in the seat of Lingiari in the 2022 federal election. indicates at what stage the winning candidate had over 50% of the votes and was declared the winner.

==== Solomon ====
2022 Australian federal election: Solomon
| Party | Candidate | Votes | % | ±% |
|---|---|---|---|---|
| Labor | Luke Gosling | 21,775 | 39.50 | −0.54 |
| Country Liberal | Tina Macfarlane | 13,771 | 24.98 | −13.07 |
| Greens | Aiya Goodrich Carttling | 8,164 | 14.81 | +2.97 |
| Liberal Democrats | Kylie Bonanni | 5,839 | 10.59 | +10.59 |
| One Nation | Emily Lohse | 2,948 | 5.35 | +5.35 |
| United Australia | Tayla Selfe | 2,628 | 4.77 | +1.90 |
| Total formal votes | | 55,125 | 96.48 | +0.85 |
| Informal votes | | 2,011 | 3.52 | −0.85 |
| Turnout | | 57,136 | 79.53 | −3.55 |
Two-party-preferred result
| Labor | Luke Gosling | 32,726 | 59.37 | +6.29 |
| Country Liberal | Tina Macfarlane | 22,399 | 40.63 | −6.29 |
| Labor hold | | Swing | +6.29 | |

Alluvial diagram for preference flows in the seat of Solomon in the 2022 federal election. indicates at what stage the winning candidate had over 50% of the votes and was declared the winner.
