= Endorsements in the 2019 Australian federal election =

Various newspapers, organisations and individuals endorsed parties or individual candidates for the 2019 Australian federal election.

== Endorsements for parties ==
=== Newspapers and magazines ===
==== National daily newspapers ====
National daily newspapers
Newspapers	Endorsement
The Australian	Coalition
The Australian Financial Review	Coalition

Metropolitan and provincial dailies
Newspapers	Endorsement
Daily Telegraph	Coalition
Herald Sun	Coalition
Courier-Mail	Coalition
The Sydney Morning Herald	Labor
The West Australian	Coalition
Adelaide Advertiser	Coalition
The Age	Labor
NT News	Labor
Geelong Advertiser	Coalition
Townsville Bulletin	Coalition

Sunday editions
Newspapers	Endorsement	Notes
The Sunday Mail (Brisbane)	Coalition	

Online publications
Newspapers	Endorsements		Notes
	Primary endorsement	Secondary endorsement	
Guardian Australia	Labor	Greens	Also advocated voting Green for "For those with more a progressive leaning and a conviction Australia should work faster to reduce emissions", and "For more conservative voters....credible independent candidates".

- Various newspapers, organisations and individuals endorsed parties or individual candidates for the 2019 Australian federal election.

=== Individuals ===
==== Liberal Party of Australia ====
- Charles Bass, entrepreneur, business executive, co-founder of Aquila Resources
- Mark Bouris AM, businessman, entrepreneur, and media personality
- Paul Darrouzet, businessman
- Rowan Dean, editor of the Spectator Australia, and Sky News Australia co-host of Outsiders
- John Gandel AC, billionaire entrepreneur, property developer and philanthropist
- Robert Gerard AO, businessman and former member of the Reserve Bank of Australia
- John Howard OM AC SSI, 25th prime minister of Australia
- Alan Jones AO, 2GB and Sky News Australia broadcaster
- Grant Lewis Kelley, chief executive and director of Vicinity Centres
- Jeff Kennett AC, 43rd premier of Victoria, and president of the Hawthorn Football Club
- Harold Mitchell AC, entrepreneur, philanthropist and humanitarian
- Alfred Moufarrige, CEO of Servcorp
- Paul Murray, Sky News Australia broadcaster
- Roslyn Packer AC, philanthropist and widow of billionaire media mogul Kerry Packer
- Rita Panahi, Sky News Australia host of The Friday Show and opinion columnist
- Andrew Peacock AC GCL, former Minister for Foreign Affairs, Minister for Defence, Australian Ambassador to the United States, and Leader and Deputy Leader of the Liberal Party
- Allan Pidgeon, businessman, president of the National Flag Association (Qld), and director of the Queensland Private Enterprise Centre
- Mark Stockwell, Olympic swimmer, businessman
- Harry Triguboff AO, billionaire real estate developer, and managing director of Meriton
- Robert Webster, company director, grazier and former National Party of Australia NSW Member of Parliament
- Paul Wheelton, businessman, founder of The Wheelton Group, and philanthropist
- Geoff Wilson, founder of Wilson Asset Management

==== National Party of Australia ====
- Michael Crouch AC, industrialist, philanthropist and chairman of Australian private company Midgeon Holdings

==== Australian Labor Party ====
- Van Badham, writer and social commentator
- Jimmy Barnes AO, rock singer, songwriter and member of Cold Chisel
- Peter Beattie AC, 36th premier of Queensland, and chair of the Australian Rugby League Commission
- Cate Blanchett AC, actress and theatre director
- Mike Carlton AM, media commentator and author
- Michael Caton, television, film and stage actor, comedian and television host
- Blanche d'Alpuget, writer and widow of the 23rd Prime Minister of Australia Bob Hawke
- Julia Gillard AC, 27th prime minister of Australia
- Bob Hawke AC GCL, 23rd prime minister of Australia (deceased)
- Bill Hayden AC, 21st governor-general of Australia, and former leader of the Australian Labor Party
- Paul Keating, 24th prime minister of Australia
- Bill Kelty AC, former secretary of the Australian Council of Trade Unions (ACTU), member of the Reserve Bank of Australia, and commissioner of the Australian Football League
- Fr. Bob Maguire AM RFD, Roman Catholic priest, community worker and media personality
- Sally McManus, secretary of the Australian Council of Trade Unions (ACTU)
- Molly Meldrum, music critic, journalist, record producer and musical entrepreneur
- Annastacia Palaszczuk, premier of Queensland
- Kevin Rudd AC, 26th prime minister of Australia
- Jordan Shanks, YouTuber and comedian

==== Australian Greens ====
- Chilla Bulbeck, former emeritus professor of women's studies at University of Adelaide
- Graeme Wood, digital entrepreneur, philanthropist and environmentalist

==== Australian Conservatives ====
- Sam Kekovich, media personality, sports commentator, 'Australian Lambassador' and former Australian rules football player

==== Sustainable Australia ====
- Dick Smith AC, entrepreneur, businessmen, aviator and philanthropist

=== Liberal Party of Australia ===
- Cartwheel Resources
- Consolidated Travel Group
- Evans Dixon Limited
- KTQ Developments
- Master Builders Association of Australia
- Menzies Research Centre
- Meriton
- NIB Health Funds
- Servcorp

=== National Party of Australia ===
- Chalmers Legal Studio
- Clubs Australia
- Page Research Centre
- Phillip Morris International – donated to both the National Party of Australia and the Liberal Democratic Party

=== Country Liberal Party ===
- Michael Crouch AC, industrialist, philanthropist and chairman of Australian private company Midgeon Holdings

=== Australian Labor Party ===
- Australian Council of Trade Unions (ACTU)
- Australian Education Union (AEU)
- Australian Fabian Society
- Australian Rail, Tram and Bus Industry Union (RTBU)
- Australian Workers Union (AWU)
- Chifley Research Centre
- Construction, Forestry, Maritime, Mining and Energy Union (CFMMEU)
- Destroy The Joint, feminist movement
- Electrical Trades Union of Australia (ETU) – donated to both the Australian Labor Party and the Australian Greens
- Maurice Blackburn (law firm)
- United Voice
- Victorian Trades Hall Council

=== Australian Greens ===
- Electrical Trades Union of Australia (ETU) – donated to both the Australian Labor Party and the Australian Greens

=== Pauline Hanson's One Nation ===
- Adani Group – donated to both Pauline Hanson's One Nation and the Liberal Party of Australia (A.C.T. Division)

=== Katter's Australian Party ===
- Glencore
- Sporting Shooters Association of Australia

=== Liberal Democratic Party ===
- Phillip Morris International – donated to both the National Party of Australia and the Liberal Democratic Party

=== Shooters, Fishers and Farmers Party ===
- NSW Amateur Pistol Association

== New South Wales electorates ==
=== Division of Banks ===
For Chris Gambian (Labor):

- Charles Firth, comedian and member of The Chaser
- Kevin Rudd AC, 26th prime minister of Australia

=== Division of Barton ===
For Linda Burney (Labor):

- EMILY's List Australia
- Kevin Rudd AC, 26th prime minister of Australia

=== Division of Bennelong ===
For John Alexander (Liberal):

- John Howard OM AC SSI, 25th prime minister of Australia

For Brian Owler (Labor):

- Kevin Rudd AC, 26th prime minister of Australia

=== Division of Cook ===
For Scott Morrison (Liberal):

- Ben Fordham, 2GB presenter, and host of Australian Ninja Warrior
- John Howard OM AC SSI, 25th prime minister of Australia
- Alan Jones AO, 2GB and Sky News Australia broadcaster
- Jeff Kennett AC, 43rd premier of Victoria, and president of the Hawthorn Football Club
- Paul Murray, Sky News Australia broadcaster

For Simon O'Brien (Labor):

- GetUp!

For Jon Doig (Greens):

- GetUp!

For Gaye Cameron (One Nation):

- Mark Latham, state leader of One Nation in New South Wales, and former leader of the Australian Labor Party

=== Division of Cowper ===
For Pat Conaghan (National):

For Rob Oakeshott (Independent):

- Mike Cannon-Brookes, billionaire co-founder and co-CEO of Atlassian
- Russell Crowe, actor, producer, and musician
- GetUp!
- Margo Kingston, journalist, author, commentator

For Andrew Woodward (Labor):

- GetUp!

For Lauren Edwards (Greens):

- GetUp!

=== Division of Cunningham ===
For Sharon Bird (Labor):

- EMILY's List Australia

=== Division of Farrer ===
For Kevin Mack (Independent):

- Margo Kingston, journalist, author and commentator

=== Division of Gilmore ===
For Katrina Hodgkinson (Nationals):

- Joanna Gash AM, former mayor of the City of Shoalhaven, Liberal member for Gilmore (1996–2013) (Liberal)
- John Sharp, former Minister for Transport and Regional Development, member for Gilmore (1984–1993)
- Ann Sudmalis, former Liberal member for Gilmore (2013–2019) (Liberal)

For Warren Mundine (Liberal):

- John Howard OM AC SSI, 25th prime minister of Australia
- Paul Murray, Sky News Australia broadcaster

For Fiona Phillips (Labor):

- EMILY's List Australia

=== Division of Hughes ===
For Craig Kelly (Liberal):

For Diedree Steinwall (Labor):

- GetUp!

For Mitchell Shakespeare (Greens):

- GetUp!

=== Division of Hume ===
For Angus Taylor (Liberal):

For Aoife Champion (Labor):

- GetUp!

For David Powell (Greens):

- GetUp!

For Huw Kingston (Independent):

- Mike Cannon-Brookes, billionaire co-founder and co-CEO of Atlassian
- GetUp!
- Margo Kingston, journalist, author and commentator

=== Division of Lindsay ===
For Melissa McIntosh (Liberal):

- John Howard OM AC SSI, former prime minister of Australia and Leader of the Liberal Party of Australia

For Diane Beamer (Labor):

=== Division of Lyne ===
For Jeremy Miller (Independent):

- Margo Kingston, journalist, author and commentator

=== Division of Mackellar ===
For Alice Thompson (Independent):

- Mike Cannon-Brookes, billionaire co-founder and co-CEO of Atlassian
- Margo Kingston, journalist, author and commentator

=== Division of Macquarie ===
For Susan Templeman (Labor):

- EMILY's List Australia

For Sarah Richards (Liberal):

=== Division of Newcastle ===
For Sharon Claydon (Labor):

- EMILY's List Australia

=== Division of New England ===
For Barnaby Joyce (Nationals):

For Adam Blakester (Independent):

- Margo Kingston, journalist, author and commentator

=== Division of Parramatta ===
For Julie Owens (Labor):

- EMILY's List Australia

=== Division of Reid ===
For Fiona Martin (Liberal):

- John Howard OM AC SSI, 25th prime minister of Australia

For Sam Crosby (Labor):

- Kevin Rudd AC, 26th prime minister of Australia

=== Division of Robertson ===
For Lucy Wicks (Liberal):

- John Howard OM AC SSI, 25th prime minister of Australia

For Anne Charlton (Labor):

- EMILY's List Australia
- GetUp!

For Cath Connor (Greens):

- GetUp!

=== Division of Sydney ===
For Tanya Plibersek (Labor):

- EMILY's List Australia

=== Division of Warringah ===
For Tony Abbott (Liberal):

- John Anderson AO, former deputy prime minister of Australia, and former leader of the National Party
- Mike Baird AO, 44th premier of New South Wales
- Gladys Berejiklian, premier of New South Wales
- Andrew Bolt, Herald Sun columnist, Sky News Australia and 2GB broadcaster
- Roger Corbett AO, businessman and former CEO of Woolworths Limited
- Christine Forster, councillor of the City of Sydney, and sister to Tony Abbott
- John Howard OM AC SSI, 25th prime minister of Australia
- Brett Lee, Australian cricketer, film actor and Fox Sports commentator
- Greg Sheridan AO, foreign affairs journalist and conservative commentator

For Zali Steggall (Independent):

- Layne Beachley AO, world champion surfer
- Mike Cannon-Brookes, billionaire co-founder and co-CEO of Atlassian
- Peter FitzSimons AM, journalist, radio and television presenter, author and chair of the Australian Republican Movement
- Rickard Gardell, managing director and co-founder of Pacific Equity Partners
- GetUp!
- Margo Kingston, journalist, author and commentator
- Guy Leech, former Ironman surf lifesaving champion
- Kerryn Phelps AM, independent member for Wentworth, and former president of the Australian Medical Association

For Susan Moylan-Coombs (Independent)

- GetUp!

For Kristyn Glanville (Greens)

- GetUp!

For Dean Harris (Labor):

- GetUp!

=== Division of Wentworth ===
For Dave Sharma (Liberal):

- Julie Bishop, former Minister for Foreign Affairs and Deputy Leader of the Liberal Party
- Harries Carroll, Bondi Rescue lifeguard
- David Gonski AC, businessman and chancellor of the University of New South Wales
- John Howard OM AC SSI, 25th prime minister of Australia
- Solomon Lew, businessman and chairman of Premier Investments
- James Packer, billionaire businessman and investor
- Malcolm Turnbull, 29th prime minister of Australia

For Kerryn Phelps (Independent):

- Darrin Barnett, press secretary to the 27th Prime Minister of Australia Julia Gillard
- Layne Beachley AO, world champion surfer
- Mike Cannon-Brookes, billionaire co-founder and co-CEO of Atlassian
- GetUp!
- John Hewson AM, former Leader of the Liberal Party
- Margo Kingston, journalist, author and commentator

For Tim Murray (Labor):

- Michael Caton, television, film and stage actor, comedian and television host
- GetUp!
- Graham Richardson AO, Sky News Australia host of Richo, political commentator, and former Minister for the Environment, Minister for Health, Minister for Transport and Communications, Minister for Social Security, and senator for New South Wales
- Alex Turnbull, fund manager and son of former Prime Minister Malcolm Turnbull

For Dominic Wy (Greens):

- GetUp!

== Victorian electorates ==
=== Division of Ballarat ===
For Catherine King (Labor):

- EMILY's List Australia

=== Division of Bendigo ===
For Lisa Chesters (Labor):

- EMILY's List Australia

=== Division of Chisholm ===
For Gladys Liu (Liberal):

For Jennifer Yang (Labor):

- Daniel Andrews, premier of Victoria
- EMILY's List Australia
- Kevin Rudd AC, 26th prime minister of Australia

=== Division of Cooper ===
For Ged Kearney (Labor):

- EMILY's List Australia
- Julia Gillard AC, 27th prime minister of Australia

=== Division of Corangamite ===
For Sarah Henderson (Liberal)

- Geelong Advertiser

For Libby Coker (Labor)

- EMILY's List Australia
- Victorian Trades Hall Council

For Damien Cole (Independent):

- Layne Beachley, world champion surfer

=== Division of Corio ===
For Richard Marles (Labor):

- Geelong Advertiser

=== Division of Deakin ===
For Michael Sukkar (Liberal):

- Advance Australia

For Shireen Morris (Labor):

- Daniel Andrews, premier of Victoria
- Steve Bracks, 44th premier of Victoria
- EMILY's List Australia
- Noel Pearson, Indigenous Australian lawyer and activist, and founder of the Cape York Institute
- Kevin Rudd AC, 26th prime minister of Australia
- Victorian Trades Hall Council

=== Division of Dunkley ===
For Chris Crewther (Liberal):

For Peta Murphy (Labor)

- EMILY's List Australia

=== Division of Flinders ===
For Greg Hunt (Liberal):

- Advance Australia
- Alexander Downer AC, former Minister for Foreign Affairs, former leader of the Liberal Party and High Commissioner to the United Kingdom
- Jeff Kennett AC, 43rd premier of Victoria, and president of the Hawthorn Football Club

For Josh Sinclair (Labor):

- GetUp!
- Victorian Trades Hall Council

For Julia Banks (Independent):

- Mike Cannon-Brookes, billionaire co-founder and co-CEO of Atlassian
- GetUp!
- Margo Kingston, journalist, author and commentator
- Alex Turnbull, fund manager and son of former Prime Minister Malcolm Turnbull
- Malcolm Turnbull, 29th prime minister of Australia

For Nathan Lesslie (Greens):

- GetUp!

=== Division of Gippsland ===
For Darren Chester (National):

For Antoinette Holm (Labor):

- EMILY's List Australia

=== Division of Higgins ===
For Katie Allen (Liberal):

- Jeff Kennett, 43rd premier of Victoria and president of the Hawthorn Football Club

For Fiona McLeod (Labor):

- Daniel Andrews, premier of Victoria
- EMILY's List Australia
- Mary Gaudron QC, first female Justice of the High Court of Australia
- Julia Gillard AC, 27th prime minister of Australia
- Barry Jones, polymath, writer, teacher, lawyer, social activist, quiz champion, Minister for Science and Technology in the Hawke government, and Australian Living Treasure
- Bob Maguire, Roman Catholic priest, community worker and media personality
- Maxine McKew, former Australian Broadcasting Corporation (ABC) journalist, and former Member for Bennelong
- Gillian Triggs, Assistant Secretary-General of the United Nations, former president of the Australian Human Rights Commission and former dean of the Sydney Law School

For Jason Ball (Greens):

- Julian Burnside, barrister and activist

=== Division of Indi ===
For Helen Haines (Independent):

- Mike Cannon-Brookes, billionaire co-founder and co-CEO of Atlassian
- Margo Kingston, journalist, author and commentator
- Cathy McGowan, former Independent MP for Indi

=== Division of Jagajaga ===
For Kate Thwaites (Labor):

- EMILY's List Australia

=== Division of Kooyong ===
For Josh Frydenberg (Liberal):

- Andrew Peacock AC GCL, former Minister for Foreign Affairs, Minister for Defence, Australian Ambassador to the United States, and Leader and Deputy Leader of the Liberal Party

For Julian Burnside (Greens):

- GetUp!
- Ian Macphee AO, Minister for Immigration and Ethnic Affairs in the Fraser government
- Gillian Triggs, Assistant Secretary-General of the United Nations, former president of the Australian Human Rights Commission and former dean of the Sydney Law School

For Jana Stewart (Labor):

- Daniel Andrews, premier of Victoria
- EMILY's List Australia
- GetUp!

For Oliver Yates (Independent):

- Mike Cannon-Brookes, billionaire co-founder and co-CEO of Atlassian
- GetUp!
- Margo Kingston, journalist, author and commentator

=== Division of Lalor ===
For Joanne Ryan (Labor):

- EMILY's List Australia

=== Division of Macnamara ===
For Josh Burns (Labor):

- Julia Gillard AC, 27th prime minister of Australia
- Bob Maguire AM RFD, Roman Catholic priest, community worker and media personality

For Kate Ashmor (Liberal):

For Steph Hodgins-May (Greens):

- Gillian Triggs, Assistant Secretary-General of the United Nations, former president of the Australian Human Rights Commission and former dean of the Sydney Law School

=== Division of Mallee ===
For Ray Kingston (Independent):

- Mike Cannon-Brookes, billionaire founder and co-CEO of Atlassian
- Margo Kingston, journalist, author and commentator

=== Division of Maribyrnong ===
For Bill Shorten (Labor):

- Peter Beattie AC, 36th premier of Queensland and chairman of the Australian Rugby League Commission
- Mike Carlton, media commentator and author
- Julia Gillard AC, 27th prime minister of Australia
- Bob Hawke AC GCL, 23rd prime minister of Australia (deceased)
- Bill Kelty AC, former secretary of the Australian Council of Trade Unions (ACTU), member of the Reserve Bank of Australia, and commissioner of the Australian Football League
- Bob Maguire AM RFD, Roman Catholic priest, community worker and media personality

=== Division of Melbourne ===
For Adam Bandt (Greens):

- Mike Cannon-Brookes, billionaire co-founder and co-CEO of Atlassian

=== Division of Menzies ===
For Kevin Andrews (Liberal):

For Stella Yee (Labor)

- EMILY's List Australia
- GetUp!
- Kevin Rudd AC, 26th prime minister of Australia

For Robert Humphreys (Greens):

- GetUp!

=== Division of Monash ===
For Jessica O'Donnell (Labor)

- EMILY's List Australia

== Queensland electorates ==
=== Division of Bonner ===
For Ross Vasta (Liberal National):

For Jo Briskey (Labor):

- EMILY's List Australia

=== Division of Brisbane ===
For Trevor Evans (Liberal National):

For Paul Newbury (Labor):

- Kevin Rudd AC, 26th prime minister of Australia

=== Division of Dawson ===
For George Christensen (Liberal National):

For Belinda Hassan (Labor):

- EMILY's List Australia
- GetUp!

For Imogen Lindenberg (Greens):

- GetUp!

=== Division of Dickson ===
For Peter Dutton (Liberal National):

- Advance Australia
- Janet Albrechtsen, chairman of the Institute of Public Affairs, opinion columnist for The Australian
- Andrew Bolt, Sky News Australia host of The Bolt Report, 2GB presenter and Herald Sun columnist
- John Howard OM AC SSI, 25th prime minister of Australia

For Ali France (Labor):

- EMILY's List Australia
- GetUp!
- Paul Keating, 24th prime minister of Australia

For Benedict Coyne (Greens):

- GetUp!

=== Division of Fadden ===
For Stuart Robert (Liberal National):

For Luz Stanton (Labor):

- EMILY's List Australia

=== Division of Griffith ===
For Terri Butler (Labor):

- EMILY's List Australia

For Olivia Roberts (Liberal National):

For Max Chandler-Mather (Greens):

=== Division of Herbert ===
For Cathy O'Toole (Labor):

- EMILY's List Australia

For Phillip Thompson (Liberal National):

=== Division of Leichhardt ===
For Warren Entsch (Liberal National):

For Elida Faith (Labor):

- EMILY's List Australia

=== Division of Longman ===
For Susan Lamb (Labor):

- EMILY's List Australia

For Terry Young (Liberal National):

=== Division of Maranoa ===
For David Littleproud (Liberal National):

For Linda Little (Labor):

- EMILY's List Australia

=== Division of Moreton ===
For Graham Perrett (Labor):

- Kevin Rudd, 26th prime minister of Australia

For Angela Owen (Liberal National):

=== Division of Petrie ===
For Luke Howarth (Liberal National):

For Corinne Mulholland (Labor):

- EMILY's List Australia

== Western Australian electorates ==
=== Division of Brand ===
For Madeleine King (Labor):

- EMILY's List Australia

=== Division of Canning ===
For Andrew Hastie (Liberal):

- Advance Australia
- Master Builders Association of Western Australia

For Mellisa Teede (Labor):

- EMILY's List Australia
- GetUp!

For Jodie Moffat (Greens):

- GetUp!

=== Division of Curtin ===
For Celia Hammond (Liberal):

- Julie Bishop, former Minister of Foreign Affairs, former Deputy Leader of the Liberal Party and former Minister for Education and Science
- John Howard OM AC SSI, 25th prime minister of Australia

=== Division of Hasluck ===
For Ken Wyatt (Liberal):

- John Howard OM AC SSI, 25th prime minister of Australia

=== Division of Moore ===
For Ian Goodenough (Liberal):

- Master Builders Association of Western Australia

=== Division of Pearce ===
For Christian Porter (Liberal):

- Advance Australia
- John Howard OM AC SSI, 25th prime minister of Australia
- Master Builders Association of Western Australia

For Kim Travers (Labor)

- EMILY's List Australia
- GetUp!

For Eugene Marshall (Greens)

- GetUp!

=== Division of Swan ===
For Steve Irons (Liberal):

- John Howard OM AC SSI, 25th prime minister of Australia

For Hannah Beazley (Labor):

- EMILY's List Australia

=== Division of Tangney ===
For Ben Morton (Liberal):

For Marion Boswell (Labor):

- EMILY's List Australia

== South Australian electorates ==
=== Division of Boothby ===
For Nicolle Flint (Liberal):

- Advance Australia
- Alexander Downer AC, former Minister for Foreign Affairs, former leader of the Liberal Party, and High Commissioner to the United Kingdom
- John Howard OM AC SSI, 25th prime minister of Australia

For Nadia Clancy (Labor):

- EMILY's List Australia
- GetUp!

For Stef Rozitis (Greens):

- GetUp!

=== Division of Grey ===
For Rowan Ramsey (Liberal):

For Karin Bolton (Labor):

- EMILY's List Australia

=== Division of Mayo ===
For Rebekha Sharkie (Centre Alliance):

- Mike Cannon-Brookes, billionaire co-founder and co-CEO of Atlassian
- GetUp!
- Margo Kingston, journalist, author and commentator

For Georgina Downer (Liberal):

- Alexander Downer AC, former Minister for Foreign Affairs, former leader of the Liberal Party, High Commissioner to the United Kingdom, and father of Georgina

For Anne Bourne (Greens):

- GetUp!

For Saskia Gerhardy (Labor):

- GetUp!

=== Division of Sturt ===
For James Stevens:

- Carolyn Hewson AO, businesswoman and director of BHP
- Christopher Pyne, former Minister for Defence, Minister for Defence Industry, Leader of the House, Minister for Industry, Science and Innovation, Minister for Education and Training, Minister for Ageing, Member for Sturt (1993–2019)
- Amanda Vanstone AO, former Minister for Immigration and Multicultural Affairs, Minister for Family and Community Services, Minister for Justice, Minister for Education, Minister for Employment, senator for South Australia and Ambassador to Italy

== Tasmanian electorates ==
=== Division of Bass ===
For Bridget Archer (Liberal):

For Ross Hart (Labor):

For Todd Lambert (Recreational Fishers):

- Construction, Forestry, Maritime, Mining and Energy Union (CFMMEU)

=== Division of Braddon ===
For Justine Keay (Labor):

- EMILY's List Australia

For Gavin Pearce (Liberal):

For Brett Smith (Independent):

- Construction, Forestry, Maritime, Mining and Energy Union (CFMMEU)

=== Division of Clark ===
For Andrew Wilkie (Independent)

- GetUp!
- Margo Kingston, journalist, author and commentator

For Ben McGregor (Labor)

- GetUp!

For Juniper Shaw (Greens)

- GetUp!

=== Division of Lyons ===
For Brian Mitchell (Labor):

For Jessica Whelan (Liberal):

For Deanna Hutchison (National):

=== Division of Franklin ===
For Julie Collins (Labor):

- EMILY's List Australia

== Senate candidates ==
=== Australian Capital Territory ===
For the Liberal Party of Australia (A.C.T. Division)

- Adani Group – donated to both Pauline Hanson's One Nation and the Liberal Party of Australia (A.C.T. Division)

For Katy Gallagher (Labor):

- GetUp!

For Alicia Payne (Labor):

- EMILY's List Australia

For Nancy Waites (Labor):

- EMILY's List Australia

For Penny Kyburz (Greens)

- GetUp!

For Anthony Pesec (Independent):

- Mike Cannon-Brookes, billionaire co-founder and co-CEO of Atlassian
- GetUp!
- Margo Kingston, journalist, author and commentator
- Alex Turnbull, fund manager and son of the 29th Prime Minister of Australia Malcolm Turnbull

=== New South Wales ===
For the Liberal Party of Australia (New South Wales Division)

- Brook Adcock, chairman of Adcock Private Equity
- Companion Systems
- Michael Crouch AC, industrialist, philanthropist and chairman of Australian private company Midgeon Holdings
- Evans Dixon Limited
- NIB Health Funds
- Pacific Blue Capital

For the Australian Labor Party (New South Wales Branch):

- Australian Rail, Tram and Bus Industry Union (RTBU)
- GetUp!

For the Greens New South Wales:

- GetUp!

For Jim Molan (Liberal):

- Andrew Bolt, Sky News Australia host of The Bolt Report and conservative columnist
- Russell Crowe, actor, producer and musician
- Bob Fulton, former professional rugby league player, coach and commentator
- Peter Hartcher, journalist and the Political and International Editor of the Sydney Morning Herald
- Alan Jones, 2GB and Sky News Australia broadcaster
- Erin Molan, Nine Network sports presenter and daughter of Jim Molan

For Simonne Pengelly (Labor):

- EMILY's List Australia

For Rod Bower (Independents for Climate Action Now)

- Mike Cannon-Brookes, billionaire co-founder and co-CEO of Atlassian
- Margo Kingston, journalist, author and commentator

=== Northern Territory ===
For Malarndirri McCarthy (Labor):

- EMILY's List Australia

For Sam McMahon (Country Liberal):

=== Queensland ===
For the Liberal National Party of Queensland

- Paul Darrouzet, businessman
- Brian Flannery, billionaire investor, and owner of Ilwella Pty Ltd
- JJ Richards & Sons
- Lancini Group
- Pacific Blue Capital
- Mark Stockwell, Olympic swimmer, and businessman

For the Australian Labor Party (Queensland Branch):

- Australian Rail, Tram and Bus Industry Union (RTBU)
- GetUp!
- Hawker Britton
- Holding Redlich

For the Queensland Greens:

- GetUp!

For Nita Green (Labor):

- EMILY's List Australia

=== South Australia ===
For the Australian Labor Party (South Australian Branch):

- Balgra Shopping Centre Management
- GetUp!

For the Liberal Party of Australia (South Australian Division):

- Cartwheel Resources
- Robert Gerard, businessman and former member of the Reserve Bank of Australia
- Hugh MacLachlan, pastoralist

For the Greens South Australia:

- GetUp!

For Sarah Hanson-Young (Greens):

- Jane Caro, social commentator, writer and lecturer
- Jason Gillespie, cricket coach and former cricketer
- Alex Greenwich, Independent Member for Sydney in the New South Wales Legislative Assembly, and LGBTQI+ rights activist
- John Hewson, former Leader of the Liberal Party, and former Leader of the Opposition

For Centre Alliance:

- GetUp!

For Emily Gore (Labor):

- EMILY's List Australia

For Larissa Harrison (Labor):

- EMILY's List Australia

=== Tasmania ===
For the Australian Labor Party (Tasmanian Branch):

- Australian Rail, Tram and Bus Industry Union (RTBU)
- Australian Workers Union (AWU)
- Construction, Forestry, Maritime, Mining and Energy Union (CFMMEU)
- GetUp!
- Kalis Hospitality

For the Tasmanian Greens:

- GetUp!

=== Victoria ===
For the Australian Labor Party (Victorian Branch):

- Corrs Chambers Westgarth
- GetUp!
- Hawker Britton
- Holding Redlich

For Kimberley Kitching (Labor):

- Bob Maguire, Roman Catholic priest, community worker and media personality

For Jess Walsh (Labor):

- EMILY's List Australia

For Karen Douglas (Labor):

- EMILY's List Australia

For Louise Crawford (Labor):

- EMILY's List Australia

For the Liberal Party of Australia (Victorian Division):

- Bensons Property Group
- Consolidated Travel Group
- Evans Dixon Limited
- Phil Munday, team principal of 23Red Racing
- Riverlee Corporation
- Paul Wheelton, businessman, founder of The Wheelton Group, and philanthropist

For the Australian Greens - Victoria:

- GetUp!

For Derryn Hinch's Justice Party:

- GetUp!

=== Western Australia ===
For the Liberal Party of Australia (Western Australian Division)

- Michael Crouch AC, industrialist, philanthropist and chairman of Australian private company Midgeon Holdings
- Helicopter Film Services
- Master Builders Association of Western Australia
- Stan Perron AC, billionaire businessman, founder of the Perron Group (deceased)

For the Australian Labor Party (Western Australian Branch):

- GetUp!
- Hawker Britton

For the Greens Western Australia

- GetUp!

For Anne Aly (Labor):

- EMILY's List Australia

For Louise Pratt (Labor):

- EMILY's List Australia
