= 2019 Australian Senate election =

2019 Australian federal election (Senate)
- 18 May 2019

40 of the 76 seats in the Australian Senate 39 seats needed for a majority
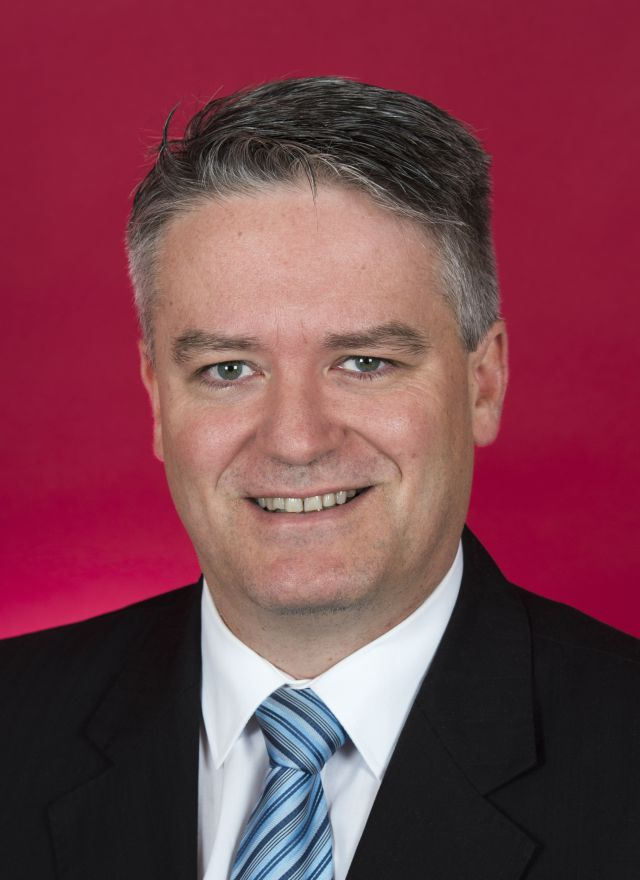

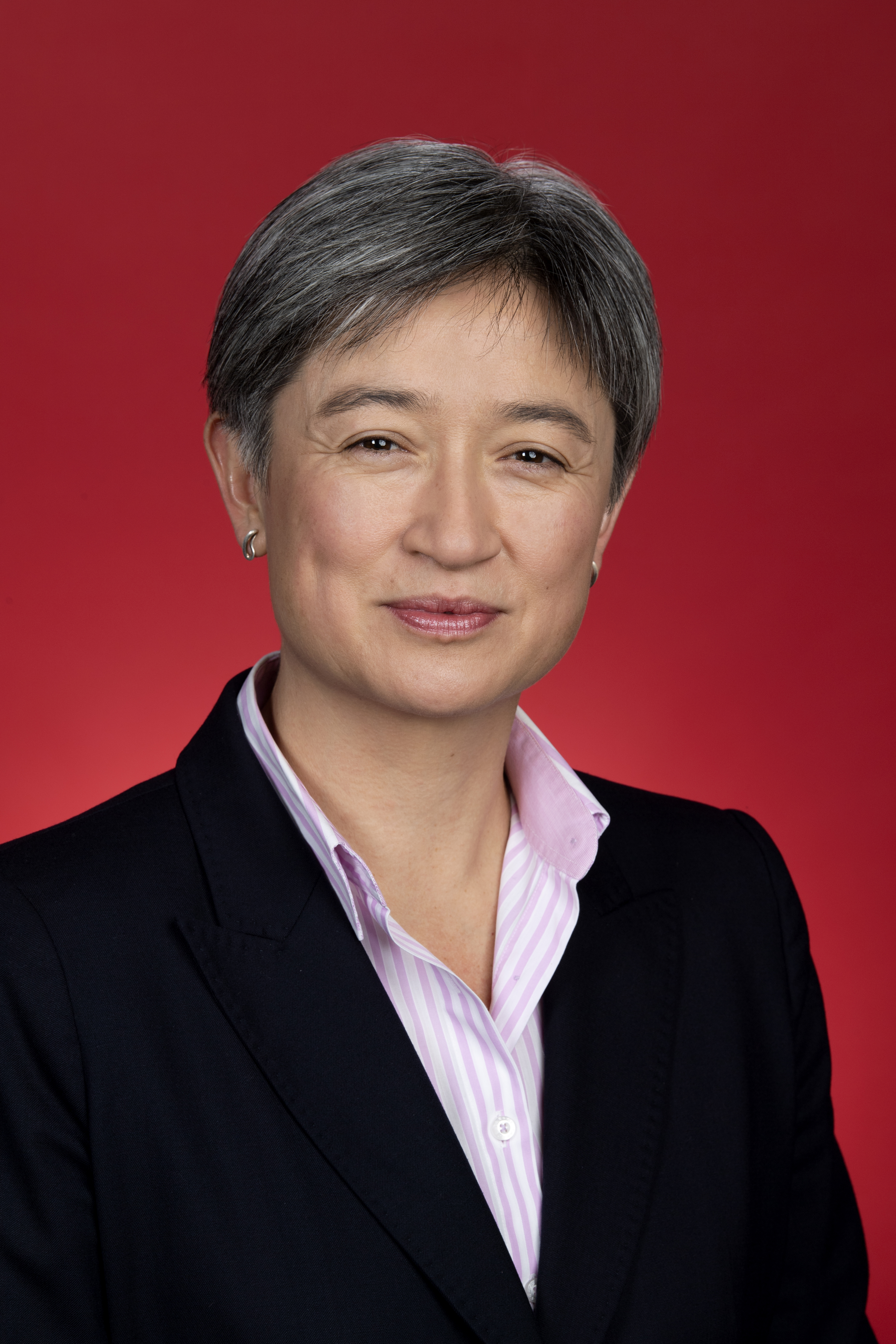

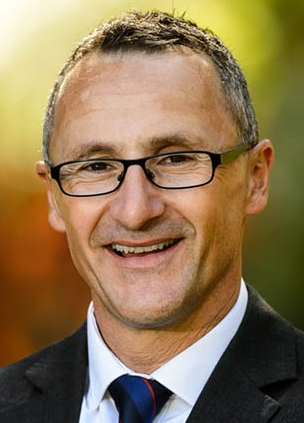

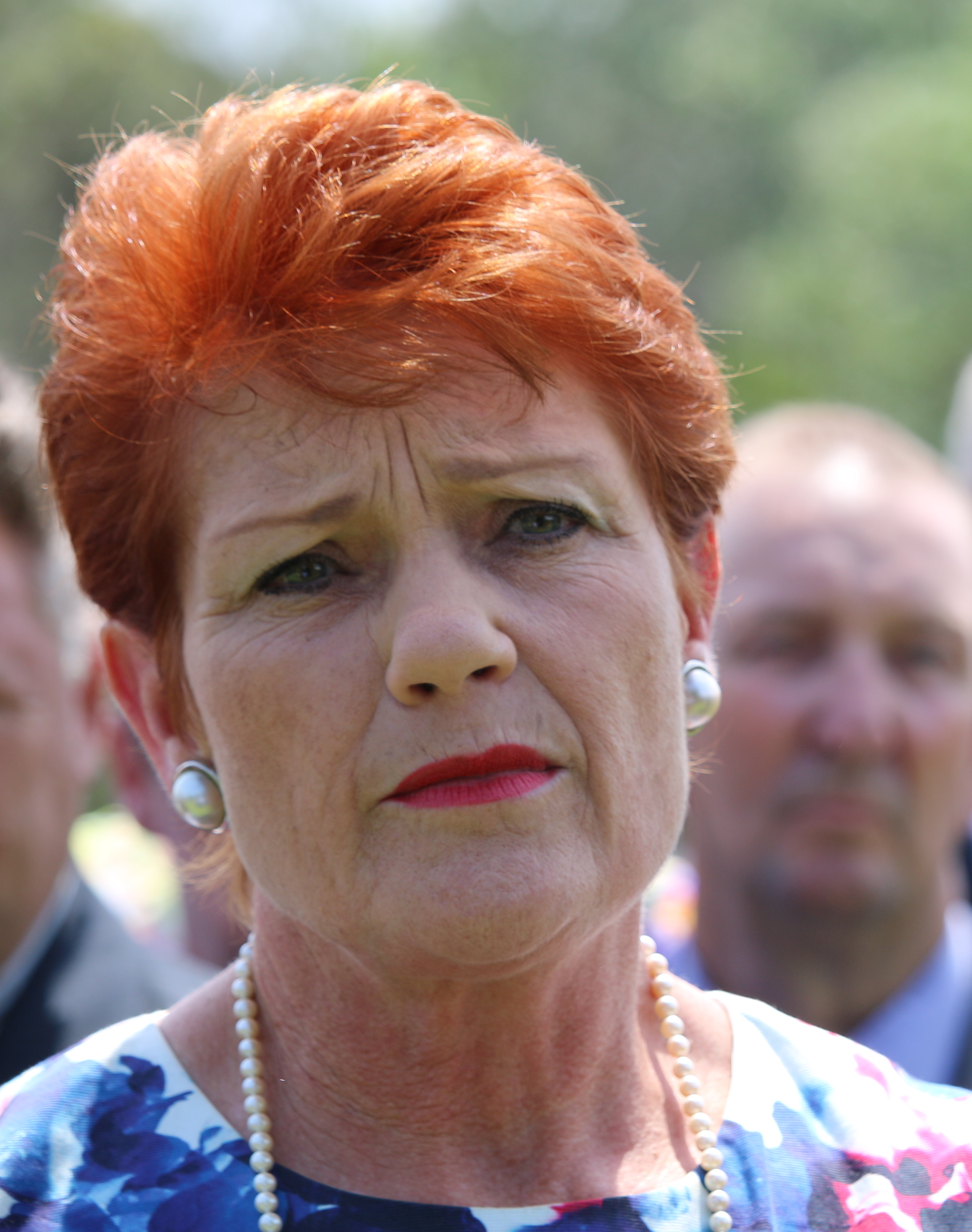

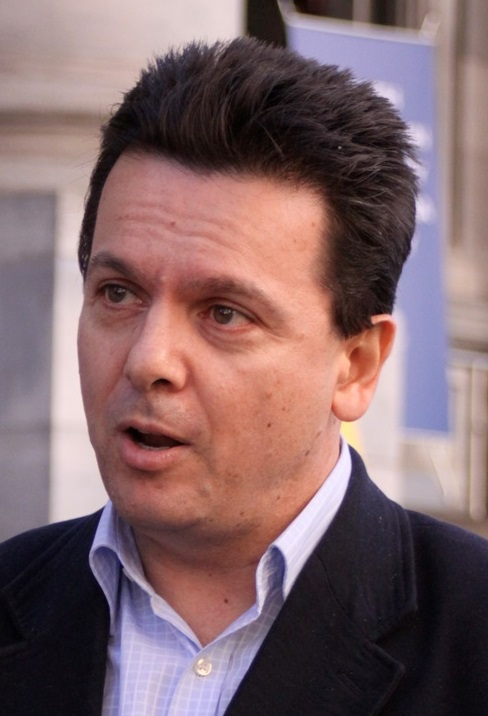

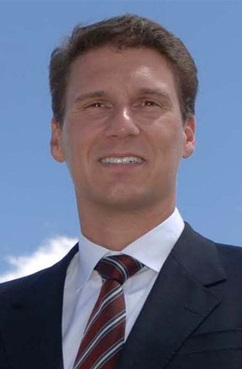

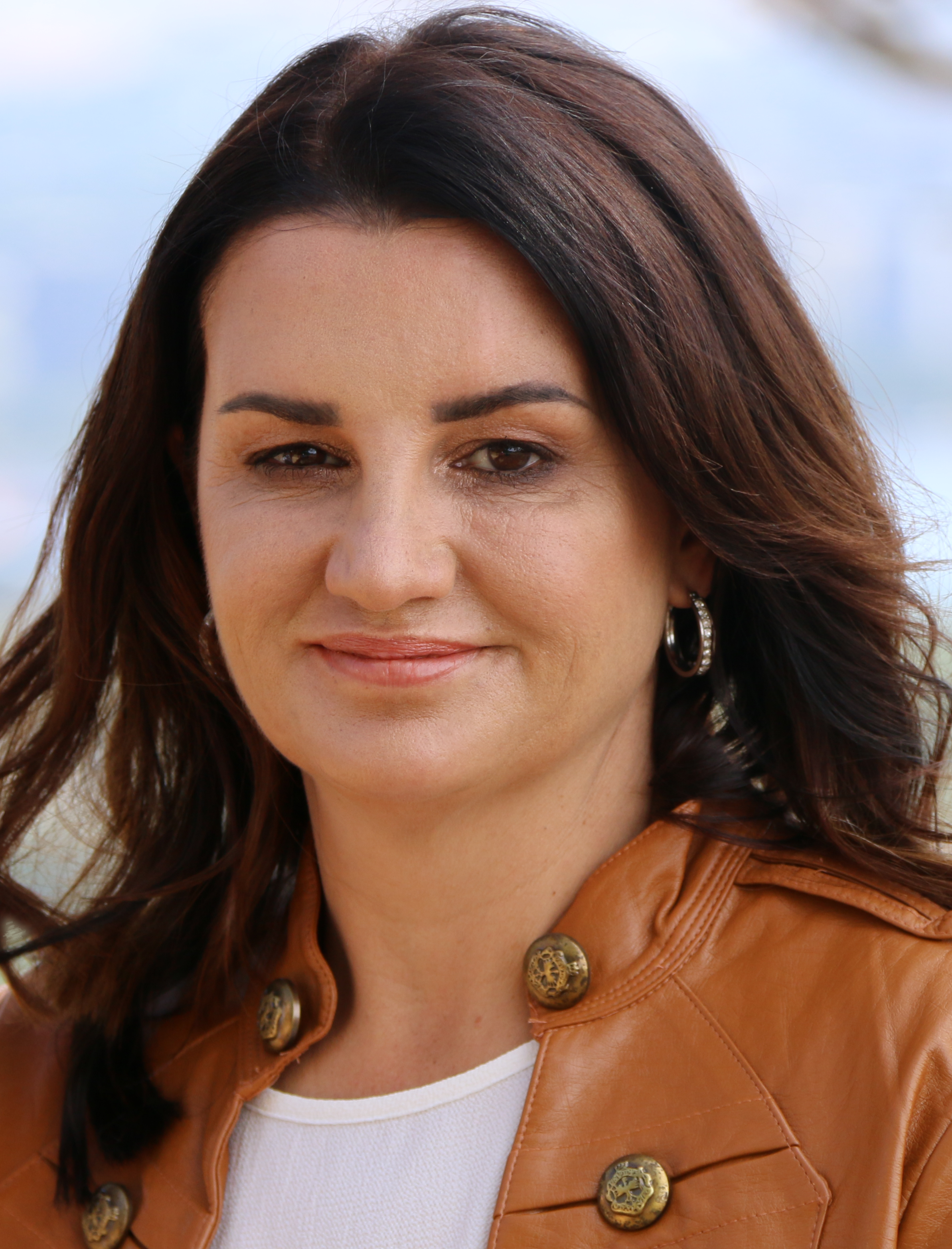

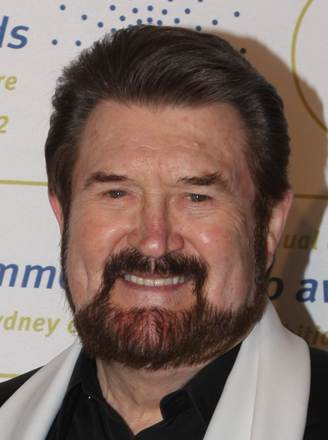
	First party	Second party	Third party
Leader	Mathias Cormann (Note: Cormann was the Leader of the Government in the Senate, whereas the leader of the Coalition in the Australian House of Representatives was Prime Minister Scott Morrison.)	Penny Wong (Note: Wong was the Leader of the Opposition in the Senate, whereas the leader of the Labor Party in the Australian House of Representatives was Opposition Leader Bill Shorten.)	Richard Di Natale
Party	Liberal/National Coalition	Labor	Greens
Leader since	20 December 2017	26 June 2013	6 May 2015
Leader's seat	Western Australia	South Australia	Victoria
Seats before	30	26	9
Seats won	19	13	6
Seats after	35	26	9
Seat change	▲5	Steady	Steady
Popular vote	5,548,142	4,204,313	1,488,427
Percentage	37.99%	28.79%	10.19%
Swing	▲2.80	▼1.01	▲1.54
	Fourth party	Fifth party	Sixth party
Leader	Pauline Hanson	Nick Xenophon	Cory Bernardi
Party	One Nation	Centre Alliance	Conservatives
Leader's seat	Queensland	South Australia	South Australia
Seats before	4 (Note: Including Brian Burston, who left One Nation to join the United Australia Party.)	3	1
Seats won	1	0	0
Seats after	2	2	1
Seat change	▼2	▼1	Steady
Popular vote	788,203	28,416	102,769
Percentage	5.40%	0.19%	0.64%
Swing	▲1.12	▼3.10	▲0.64
	Seventh party	Eighth party	Ninth party
		LDP
Leader	Jacqui Lambie	Duncan Spender	Derryn Hinch
Party	JLN	Liberal Democrats	Justice
Leader's seat	Tasmania	New South Wales (lost seat)	Victoria (lost seat)
Seats before	1	1	1
Seats won	1	0	0
Seats after	1	0	0
Seat change	Steady	▼1	▼1
Popular vote	31,383	169,735	105,459
Percentage	0.21%	1.16%	0.72%
Swing	▼0.28	▼1.00	▼1.20
- Results by state or territory
Leader of the Senate before election
Mathias Cormann
Liberal/National coalition
Elected Leader of the Senate
Mathias Cormann
Liberal/National coalition

These are the results for the Australian Senate at the 2019 Australian federal election.

== Australia ==
Senate (STV) – Turnout 92.48% (CV)
Party	Votes	%	±	Seats			
Party	Votes	%	±	Seats won	Not up	New total	Seat change
Liberal/National Coalition							
Liberal/National joint ticket	3,152,483	21.59	+1.57	6	6	12	▲2
Liberal	1,204,039	8.24	+0.53	9	7	16 (Note: Cory Bernardi had resigned from the Liberal Party in February 2017 to form a separate party, the Australian Conservatives.) (Note: Lucy Gichuhi resigned from Family First and joined the Liberal Party.)	▲2
Liberal National (Qld)	1,128,730	7.73	+0.79	3	3	6	▲1
Country Liberal (NT)	38,513	0.26	−0.00	1	0	1	Steady
National	24,377	0.17	−0.08	0	0	0	Steady
Coalition total	5,548,142	37.99	+2.80	19	16	35	▲5
Labor (Note: Including Country Labor Party in New South Wales.)	4,204,313	28.79	−1.01	13	13	26	Steady
Greens	1,488,427	10.19	+1.54	6	3	9	Steady
One Nation	788,203	5.40	+1.12	1	1	2	▼2
United Australia	345,199	2.36	+1.86				Steady
HEMP	262,426	1.80	+1.59				
Shooters, Fishers and Farmers	253,267	1.73	+0.34				
Animal Justice	183,996	1.26	+0.11				
Liberal Democrats	169,735	1.16	−1.00	0	0	0	▼1
Democratic Labour	149,970	1.03	+0.35				
Justice	105,459	0.72	−1.20	0	0	0	▼1
Conservatives	102,769	0.70	+0.70	0	1	1 (Note: Lucy Gichuhi resigned from Family First and joined the Liberal Party.)	Steady
Christian Democrats	94,301	0.65	−0.52				
Conservative National	94,130	0.64	+0.64				
Rise Up Australia	64,344	0.44	+0.18				
Sustainable Australia	59,349	0.41	+0.22				
Pirate	53,888	0.37	+0.12				
ICAN	53,453	0.37	0.37				
Katter's Australian	51,407	0.35	−0.03				
Health Australia	39,643	0.27	−0.35				
Great Australian	34,199	0.23	+0.23				
Small Business	32,751	0.22	+0.22				
Lambie Network	31,383	0.21	−0.28	1	0	1	Steady
Climate Action!	31,113	0.21	+0.12				
Centre Alliance	28,416	0.19	−3.10	0	2	2	▼1
Australian Workers	28,381	0.19	+0.19				
Democrats	24,992	0.17	+0.17				
Christians	23,983	0.16	−0.32				
Better Families	19,285	0.13	+0.13				
Science	18,972	0.13	+0.12				
Affordable Housing	17,330	0.12	+0.12				
Western Australia	17,213	0.12	+0.12				
Involuntary Medication Objectors	17,055	0.12	+0.12				
Women's Party	16,461	0.11	+0.11				
Socialist Equality	14,515	0.10	+0.04				
Australian People's Party	11,931	0.08	+0.08				
Citizen's Electoral Council	10,230	0.07	+0.00				
Love Australia or Leave	10,099	0.07	+0.07				
VOTEFLUX	8,119	0.06	−0.09				
Socialist Alliance	7,905	0.05	−0.02				
Republican	7,762	0.05	+0.05				
Seniors United	6,999	0.05	−0.11				
Together	6,127	0.04	+0.04				
Secular	4,001	0.03	−0.05				
Yellow Vest Australia	3,263	0.02	−0.72				
Unendorsed/ungrouped	60,019	0.41	+0.23				
Total	14,604,925	100.00	–	40	36	76	
Invalid/blank votes	579,160	3.81	−0.13				
Registered voters/turnout	16,419,543	92.48	+0.55				
Source: AEC Tally Room

== New South Wales ==
2019 Australian federal election: Senate, New South Wales
Party	Candidate	Votes	%	±%
Quota		670,761		
Liberal/National Coalition	1. Hollie Hughes (elected 1); 2. Andrew Bragg (elected 3); 3. Perin Davey (elected 5); 4. Jim Molan; 5. Sam Farraway; 6. Michael Feneley	1,810,121	38.55	+2.70
Labor	1. Tony Sheldon (elected 2); 2. Tim Ayres (elected 4); 3. Jason Yat-Sen Li; 4. Simonne Pengelly; 5. Aruna Chandrala; 6. Charlie Sheahan	1,400,295	29.82	−1.46
Greens	1. Mehreen Faruqi (elected 6); 2. Rachael Jacobs; 3. Louise Steer; 4. Philippa Clark; 5. Roz Chia; 6. Sylvie Ellsmore	409,790	8.73	+1.32
One Nation	1. Kate McCulloch; 2. Barry Reed	232,865	4.96	+0.86
Shooters, Fishers, Farmers	1. Brett Cooke; 2. Wayne Borsak	119,408	2.54	+0.56
HEMP	1. Andrew Katelaris; 2. Michael Balderstone	99,644	2.12	+1.46
Liberal Democrats	1. Duncan Spender; 2. Codie Neville	89,833	1.91	−1.18
Christian Democrats	1. Silvana Nile; 2. Annie Wright	75,510	1.61	−1.09
United Australia	1. Brian Burston; 2. Christine Bernier; 3. Wayne Moore	69,911	1.49	+1.49
Animal Justice	1. Angela Pollard; 2. Michael Dello-Iacovo; 3. Carol Bellenger	48,989	1.04	+0.19
Rise Up Australia	1. Maree Nichols; 2. Vladimir Shigrov; 3. Leo Toop	33,269	0.71	+0.54
ICAN	1. Rod Bower; 2. Jim Tait; 3. Annette Schnider	26,734	0.57	+0.57
Democratic Labour	1. Daniel Hanna; 2. Benedict O'Brien	26,439	0.56	−0.59
Health Australia	1. Molly Knight; 2. Jason Fairbairn	23,181	0.49	−0.69
Conservatives	1. Sophie York; 2. Riccardo Bosi	23,152	0.49	+0.49
Sustainable Australia	1. William Bourke; 2. Warren Grzic	20,235	0.43	+0.26
Science	1. Andrea Leong; 2. Eve Slavich; 3. Peter Furness; 4. Greg Parker	18,972	0.40	+0.40
Conservative National	1. Carolyn Thomson; 2. Gary Young; 3. Paul Swann; 4. Ian Wharton	17,911	0.38	+0.38
Affordable Housing	1. Andrew Potts; 2. Anthony Ziebell	17,330	0.37	+0.37
Pirate	1. John August; 2. Sara Joyce	16,887	0.36	+0.11
Women's Party	1. Divvi De Vendre; 2. Penelope Lloyd	16,461	0.35	+0.35
Small Business	1. Angela Vithoulkas; 2. Fiona Douskou	14,217	0.30	+0.30
People's Party	1. Steven Georgantis; 2. Susan Tsangaris	11,931	0.25	+0.25
Democrats	1. Peter Mailler; 2. Chris Buckman	8,735	0.19	+0.19
Great Australian	1. Matthew Hopkins; 2. Karen Burge	7,880	0.17	+0.17
Australian Workers	1. Mark Ptolemy; 2. Maria Nguyen	7,684	0.16	+0.16
Better Families	1. Jewell Drury; 2. Peter Moujalli	7,550	0.16	+0.16
Seniors United	1. Paul Gerantonis; 2. Helen Ducker	6,999	0.15	−0.34
Climate Action!	1. Nick Debenham; 2. Guy Forsyth	6,417	0.14	+0.00
Together	1. Mark Swivel; 2. Belinda Kinkead; 3. Kate McDowell	6,127	0.13	+0.13
Socialist Alliance	1. Susan Price; 2. Joel McAlear	6,058	0.13	+0.01
Involuntary Medication Objectors	1. Michael O'Neill; 2. Marelle Burnum Burnum	5,024	0.11	+0.11
VOTEFLUX.ORG	1. Ben Rushton; 2. Joanne Cotterill	3,562	0.08	−0.20
Socialist Equality	1. Richard Phillips; 2. John Davis	2,100	0.04	−0.03
Citizens Electoral Council	1. Ann Lawler; 2. Robert Butler	1,478	0.03	−0.01
Ungrouped	John Carmichael; Chifley Haddad; Phil Baker; Graeme Doyle; John John Romanous; Hussein Faraj; Russell Barber; Sandra Lazarus; Glenn Wagner; David O'Brien; Wayne Bell; Michael Kirkwood; Pamela Johnstone; Carolyn Crossman	2,627	0.06	−0.09
Total formal votes		4,695,326	95.72	+0.25
Informal votes		210,146	4.28	−0.25
Turnout		4,905,472	92.65	+0.10

Elected	#	Senator	Party
2019	1	Hollie Hughes	Liberal
2019	2	Tony Sheldon	Labor
2019	3	Andrew Bragg	Liberal
2019	4	Tim Ayres	Labor
2019	5	Perin Davey	Nationals
2019	6	Mehreen Faruqi	Greens
2016
2016	1	Marise Payne	Liberal
2016	2	Kristina Keneally	Labor
2016	3	Arthur Sinodinos	Liberal
2016	4	Jenny McAllister	Labor
2016	5	Concetta Fierravanti-Wells	Liberal
2016	6	Deborah O'Neill	Labor

== Victoria ==
2019 Australian federal election: Senate, Victoria
Party	Candidate	Votes	%	±%
Quota		534,207		
Liberal/National Coalition	1. James Paterson (elected 1); 2. Jane Hume (elected 3); 3. David Van (elected 6); 4. Anita Rank; 5. Kyle Hoppitt; 6. Julian Mulcahy	1,342,362	35.90	+2.79
Labor	1. Raff Ciccone (elected 2); 2. Jess Walsh (elected 4); 3. Gavin Marshall; 4. Parvinder Sarwara; 5. Karen Douglas; 6. Louise Crawford	1,163,853	31.12	+0.39
Greens	1. Janet Rice (elected 5); 2. Apsara Sabaratnam; 3. Claire Proctor; 4. Nakita Thomson; 5. Alice Barnes; 6. Judy Cameron	397,133	10.62	−0.25
One Nation	1. James Hallam; 2. Ian Cameron	106,742	2.85	+1.04
Justice	1. Derryn Hinch; 2. Simone O'Brien	105,459	2.82	−3.23
Democratic Labour	1. Jennifer Bowden; 2. Chris McCormack; 3. Kathryn Breakwell	94,720	2.53	+2.01
United Australia	1. Catriona Thoolen; 2. Katie O'Connor; 3. Roger McKay	92,691	2.48	+2.48
Shooters, Fishers, Farmers	1. Ricky Muir; 2. Damian Stock	69,322	1.85	+0.80
Animal Justice	1. Ben Schultz; 2. Fiona McRostie	57,287	1.53	−0.21
HEMP	1. Frances Hood; 2. Heather Gladman	56,117	1.50	+1.50
Liberal Democrats	1. Robert Kennedy; 2. Kirsty O'Sullivan	35,719	0.96	−0.63
Conservatives	1. Kevin Bailey; 2. Nina van Strijp; 3. Trent Thomas	24,443	0.65	+0.65
Christian Democrats	1. Bob Payne; 2. Kevin Murphy	18,791	0.50	+0.23
Small Business	1. Simon Kemp; 2. Peter Graham	18,534	0.50	+0.50
Conservative National	1. Bruce Stevens; 2. Rita Mazalevskis; 3. Benjamin Williamson	16,585	0.44	+0.44
ICAN	1. Paul Wittwer; 2. Kammy Cordner Hunt	15,183	0.41	+0.41
Pirate	1. Tania Briese; 2. Shannon Smith	15,043	0.40	+0.02
Sustainable Australia	1. Allan Doensen; 2. Madeleine Wearne	14,133	0.38	+0.08
Health Australia	1. Isaac Golden; 2. Andrew Hicks	12,899	0.34	−0.15
Socialist Equality	1. Tessa Pietsch; 2. Jason Wardle	12,415	0.33	+0.24
Climate Action!	1. Philip Ayton; 2. Monika Kompara	12,363	0.33	+0.33
Australian Workers	1. Narelle Everard; 2. Kevin Gaynor	10,710	0.29	+0.29
Democrats	1. David Collyer; 2. Marc Williams	9,760	0.26	+0.26
Republican	1. Geoff Lutz; 2. Peter Consandine	7,762	0.21	+0.21
Rise Up Australia	1. Rosalie Crestani; 2. Danny Nalliah	6,591	0.18	−0.11
Great Australian	1. Darryl O'Bryan; 2. Helen Edwards	5,194	0.14	+0.14
Secular	1. Harris Sultan; 2. John Perkins	4,001	0.11	+0.04
Citizens Electoral Council	1. Craig Isherwood; 2. Gabrielle Peut	3,251	0.09	+0.03
Group Z	1. Sunny Chandra; 2. Robert Whitehill	3,138	0.08	+0.08
VOTEFLUX.ORG	1. Dustin Perry; 2. Seb Carrie-Wilson	2,418	0.06	−0.02
Yellow Vest Australia	1. Daniel Jones; 2. Kenneth Nicholls	2,229	0.06	−0.60
Ungrouped	Kenneth Betts; Max Dicks; Murray McInnis; Karl Morris	2,595	0.07	−0.01
Total formal votes		3,739,443	95.98	+0.18
Informal votes		156,793	4.02	−0.18
Turnout		3,896,236	93.12	+0.95

Elected	#	Senator	Party
2019	1	James Paterson	Liberal
2019	2	Raff Ciccone	Labor
2019	3	Jane Hume	Liberal
2019	4	Jess Walsh	Labor
2019	5	Janet Rice	Greens
2019	6	David Van	Liberal
2016
2016	1	Mitch Fifield	Liberal
2016	2	Kim Carr	Labor
2016	3	Richard Di Natale	Greens
2016	4	Bridget McKenzie	National
2016	5	Kimberley Kitching	Labor
2016	6	Scott Ryan	Liberal

== Queensland ==
2019 Australian federal election: Senate, Queensland
Party	Candidate	Votes	%	±%
Quota		414,495		
Liberal National	1. Paul Scarr (elected 1); 2. Susan McDonald (elected 3); 3. Gerard Rennick (elected 5); 4. Ian Macdonald; 5. Amanda Camm; 6. Nicole Tobin	1,128,730	38.90	+3.63
Labor	1. Nita Green (elected 2); 2. Chris Ketter; 3. Frank Gilbert; 4. Tania Major; 5. Stacey Schinnerl; 6. Christina Warry	654,774	22.57	−3.81
One Nation	1. Malcolm Roberts (elected 4); 2. Steve Dickson	297,994	10.27	+1.08
Greens	1. Larissa Waters (elected 6); 2. Navdeep Singh Sidhu; 3. Johanna Kloot; 4. Raelene Ellis; 5. Miranda Bertram; 6. Kirsten Kennedy	288,320	9.94	+3.12
United Australia	1. Clive Palmer; 2. Martin Brewster; 3. Yodie Batzke	102,230	3.52	+3.52
Katter's Australian	1. Joy Marriott; 2. Gregory Wallace; 3. Alan Webb	51,407	1.77	−0.02
HEMP	1. John Jiggens; 2. Frank Jordan	50,828	1.75	+1.75
Animal Justice	1. Karagh-Mae Kelly; 2. Leah Coutts; 3. Belinda Hardy	38,624	1.33	+0.14
Conservative National	1. Fraser Anning; 2. Paul Taylor; 3. Mark Absolon; 4. Nancy Sandford; 5. Brad Cameron	37,184	1.28	+1.28
Shooters, Fishers, Farmers	1. Jeff Hodges; 2. Andrew Pope	29,329	1.01	−0.08
Conservatives	1. Lyle Shelton; 2. Joanna Lindgren; 3. Kate Horan	29,096	1.00	+1.00
Democratic Labour	1. Lindsay Temple; 2. Sheila Vincent	28,811	0.99	+0.42
Liberal Democrats	1. Gabe Buckley; 2. Lloyd Russell	24,000	0.83	−2.02
Rise Up Australia	1. Graham Healy; 2. Lionel Henaway	22,529	0.78	+0.57
Group R	1. Hetty Johnston; 2. Sue Mureau	18,341	0.63	+0.63
Pirate	1. Brandon Selic; 2. Miles Whiticker	13,432	0.46	+0.08
Climate Action!	1. Kris Bullen; 2. Robyn Stevenson	12,333	0.43	+0.23
Better Families	1. Darren Caulfield; 2. Adam Finch; 3. Rod Fox	11,735	0.40	+0.40
ICAN	1. Andrew Lewis; 2. Cornel Lokkers; 3. Gary Pead	11,536	0.40	+0.40
Love Australia or Leave	1. Kim Vuga; 2. Gavin Wyatt	10,099	0.35	+0.35
Australian Workers	1. Gregory Bradley; 2. Kathleen Wellstead	9,987	0.34	+0.34
Sustainable Australia	1. Cameron Murray; 2. Chris Simpson	8,446	0.29	+0.09
Involuntary Medication Objectors	1. Allona Lahn; 2. Adam Rowe	8,240	0.28	+0.28
Great Australian	1. Arjay Martin; 2. Tania Moohin	5,231	0.18	+0.18
Citizens Electoral Council	1. Jan Pukallus; 2. Stephen Harding	2,003	0.07	+0.00
Group X	1. Tony R. Moore; 2. Cartia Moore	1,557	0.05	+0.05
Ungrouped	Debby Lo-Dean; Gary Sharpe; Paul Larcombe; Jane Hasler; John Woodward; Nicholas McArthur-Williams; Hassan Ghulam; Wayne Wharton; Amanda Murphy; Paul Stevenson	4,668	0.16	+0.01
Total formal votes		2,901,464	96.74	+0.14
Informal votes		97,908	3.26	−0.14
Turnout		2,999,372	91.92	+0.23

Elected	#	Senator	Party
2019	1	Paul Scarr	LNP
2019	2	Nita Green	Labor
2019	3	Susan McDonald	LNP
2019	4	Malcolm Roberts	One Nation
2019	5	Gerard Rennick	LNP
2019	6	Larissa Waters	Greens
2016
2016	1	Amanda Stoker	LNP
2016	2	Murray Watt	Labor
2016	3	Pauline Hanson	One Nation
2016	4	Matt Canavan	LNP
2016	5	Anthony Chisholm	Labor
2016	6	James McGrath	LNP

== Western Australia ==
2019 Australian federal election: Senate, Western Australia
Party	Candidate	Votes	%	±%
Quota		206,661		
Liberal	1. Linda Reynolds (elected 1); 2. Slade Brockman (elected 3); 3. Matt O'Sullivan (elected 4); 4. Trischa Botha	591,860	40.91	+2.40
Labor	1. Pat Dodson (elected 2); 2. Louise Pratt (elected 5); 3. Alana Herbert; 4. Tom French; 5. Varun Ghosh; 6. Alison Vaughan	399,639	27.63	−0.73
Greens	1. Jordon Steele-John (elected 6); 2. Giz Watson; 3. Heather Lonsdale; 4. Bhuwan Khadka; 5. Jacqueline van Grootel; 6. Jordan Cahill	170,871	11.81	+1.48
One Nation	1. Peter Georgiou; 2. Martin Suter	85,129	5.88	+1.89
United Australia	1. James McDonald; 2. Russel Sewell; 3. Patrick Hardwick	25,296	1.75	+1.75
HEMP	1. Nick Lethbridge; 2. Mark Rayner	24,404	1.69	+1.69
Christians	1. Ellen Joubert; 2. Trevor Young	23,983	1.66	+0.04
National	1. Nick Fardell; 2. Siobhan Blake; 3. Louise Kingston	20,336	1.41	−1.13
Western Australia	1. Julie Matheson; 2. David Freilich; 3. Bruce Thompson; 4. Ron Norris; 5. Rod Bradley	17,213	1.19	+1.19
Shooters, Fishers, Farmers	1. Stuart Ostle; 2. Ronald Lean	17,072	1.18	−0.68
Animal Justice	1. Katrina Love; 2. Courtney Henry	14,130	0.98	+0.04
Liberal Democrats	1. John Gray; 2. Wesley Du Preez	10,438	0.72	−0.07
Pirate	1. Clive Myers; 2. Paul de Abel	8,526	0.59	+0.59
Conservative National	1. David Archibald; 2. Meredith Campbell	8,425	0.58	+0.58
Conservatives	1. Jonathan Crabtree; 2. Peter Castieau; 3. Matt Brazier	6,111	0.42	+0.42
Sustainable Australia	1. Yasmin Bartlett; 2. Colin Scott	4,994	0.35	+0.35
Involuntary Medication Objectors	1. Judith Wilyman; 2. Michelle Kinsella	3,791	0.26	+0.26
Health Australia	1. Teddy Craies; 2. Emily Wallis	3,563	0.25	−0.10
Great Australian	1. Rod Culleton; 2. Wayne Glew	3,196	0.22	+0.22
VOTEFLUX.ORG	1. Melissa Taaffe; 2. Leo Treasure	2,139	0.15	+0.05
Socialist Alliance	1. Petrina Harley; 2. Alex Salmon	1,847	0.12	−0.02
Citizens Electoral Council	1. Jean Robinson; 2. Barry Mason	1,097	0.08	−0.07
Yellow Vest Australia	1. Debbie Robinson; 2. Catherine Gorman	1,034	0.07	−1.34
Ungrouped	Valentine-Clive Pegrum; Ben Mullings; Glenn Hutchinson; Murray Jones; Brian Carew-Hopkins	1,529	0.11	−0.12
Total formal votes		1,446,623	96.60	−0.05
Informal votes		50,909	3.40	+0.05
Turnout		1,497,532	90.97	+1.35

Elected	#	Senator	Party
2019	1	Linda Reynolds	Liberal
2019	2	Pat Dodson	Labor
2019	3	Slade Brockman	Liberal
2019	4	Matt O'Sullivan	Liberal
2019	5	Louise Pratt	Labor
2019	6	Jordon Steele-John	Greens
2016
2016	1	Mathias Cormann	Liberal
2016	2	Sue Lines	Labor
2016	3	Rachel Siewert	Greens
2016	4	Michaelia Cash	Liberal
2016	5	Glenn Sterle	Labor
2016	6	Dean Smith	Liberal

== South Australia ==
2019 Australian federal election: Senate, South Australia
Party	Candidate	Votes	%	±%
Quota		156,404		
Liberal	1. Anne Ruston (elected 1); 2. David Fawcett (elected 3); 3. Alex Antic (elected 6); 4. Lucy Gichuhi	413,957	37.81	+5.16
Labor	1. Alex Gallacher (elected 2); 2. Marielle Smith (elected 4); 3. Emily Gore; 4. Larissa Harrison	332,399	30.36	+3.04
Greens	1. Sarah Hanson-Young (elected 5); 2. Major Sumner; 3. Gwydion Rozitisolds; 4. Robyn Seto	119,470	10.91	+5.03
One Nation	1. Jennifer Game; 2. Emma Illies	53,314	4.87	+1.88
United Australia	1. Kristian Rees; 2. Kerry Kovacs; 3. Sharon Hoskin	33,191	3.03	+3.03
Centre Alliance	1. Skye Kakoschke-Moore; 2. Craig Bossie	28,416	2.60	−19.16
HEMP	1. Angela Adams; 2. Matthew Iverson	23,265	2.13	+2.13
Animal Justice	1. Louise Pfeiffer; 2. Wendy Davey	20,445	1.87	+1.02
Conservatives	1. Rikki Lambert; 2. Carl Teusner	16,145	1.47	+1.47
Great Australian	1. Mark Aldridge; 2. Gary Matthews	12,698	1.16	+1.16
Shooters, Fishers, Farmers	1. John Hahn; 2. Wayne Kirk	12,003	1.10	+0.36
Conservative National	1. Peter Manuel; 2. Tim Dwyer	7,829	0.72	+0.72
Liberal Democrats	1. Kimbra Ransley; 2. Stephen Humble	7,345	0.67	+0.02
Democrats	1. Tim Burrow; 2. Andrew Castrique	6,497	0.59	+0.59
Sustainable Australia	1. Graham Davies; 2. Robyn Coleman	5,295	0.48	+0.48
Citizens Electoral Council	1. Sean Allwood; 2. Paul Siebert	1,611	0.15	+0.10
Ungrouped	Michael Lesiw; Brett O'Donnell; Henry Cox	943	0.09	+0.01
Total formal votes		1,094,823	96.50	−0.17
Informal votes		39,733	3.50	+0.17
Turnout		1,134,556	93.70	+0.91

Elected	#	Senator	Party
2019	1	Anne Ruston	Liberal
2019	2	Alex Gallacher	Labor
2019	3	David Fawcett	Liberal
2019	4	Marielle Smith	Labor
2019	5	Sarah Hanson-Young	Greens
2019	6	Alex Antic	Liberal
2016
2016	1	Simon Birmingham	Liberal
2016	2	Penny Wong	Labor
2016	3	Rex Patrick	Centre Alliance
2016	4	Cory Bernardi	Conservatives (Note: Lucy Gichuhi resigned from Family First and joined the Liberal Party.)
2016	5	Don Farrell	Labor
2016	6	Stirling Griff	Centre Alliance

== Tasmania ==
2019 Australian federal election: Senate, Tasmania
Party	Candidate	Votes	%	±%
Quota		50,285		
Liberal	1. Richard Colbeck (elected 1); 2. Claire Chandler (elected 3); 3. Tanya Denison	110,730	31.46	−1.07
Labor	1. Carol Brown (elected 2); 2. Catryna Bilyk (elected 5); 3. John Short; 4. Lisa Singh; 5. Wayne Roberts; 6. Robert Flanagan	107,670	30.59	−3.00
Greens	1. Nick McKim (elected 4); 2. Helen Hutchinson; 3. Simone Marsh	44,236	12.57	+1.41
Lambie	1. Jacqui Lambie (elected 6); 2. Glynn Williams; 3. Chris Reynolds	31,383	8.92	+0.62
One Nation	1. Matthew Stephen; 2. Adam Lambert	12,159	3.45	+0.88
United Australia	1. Kevin Morgan; 2. David Williams; 3. Craig Gunnis	9,281	2.64	+2.64
Shooters, Fishers, Farmers	1. Rebecca Byfield; 2. Kim Swanson	6,133	1.74	+0.36
Animal Justice	1. Karen Bevis; 2. Isobel Turner	4,521	1.28	+0.58
HEMP	1. Alfred Informal; 2. Matt Owen	4,141	1.18	+1.18
National	1. Steve Martin; 2. Wendy Hilditch	4,041	1.15	+1.15
Conservatives	1. Justin Stringer; 2. Nigel Frame	3,822	1.09	+1.09
Group O	1. Craig Garland; 2. Mark Duncan	3,649	1.03	+1.03
Liberal Democrats	1. Clinton Mead; 2. Matthew Rabey	2,400	0.68	+0.19
Sustainable Australia	1. Todd Dudley; 2. Christopher Maclay	1,783	0.51	+0.51
Conservative National	1. Michael Jones; 2. Frank Falzon	1,528	0.43	+0.43
Citizens Electoral Council	1. Ray Williams; 2. Steve Kucina	329	0.09	+0.04
Ungrouped	Greg Beck; Steve Mav; Francis Flannery; Karen Street	4,182	1.19	+1.04
Total formal votes		351,988	96.36	−0.16
Informal votes		13,284	3.64	+0.16
Turnout		365,272	94.68	+0.59

Elected	#	Senator	Party
2019	1	Richard Colbeck	Liberal
2019	2	Carol Brown	Labor
2019	3	Claire Chandler	Liberal
2019	4	Nick McKim	Greens
2019	5	Catryna Bilyk	Labor
2019	6	Jacqui Lambie	Lambie
2016
2016	1	Eric Abetz	Liberal
2016	2	Anne Urquhart	Labor
2016	3	Jonathon Duniam	Liberal
2016	4	Peter Whish-Wilson	Greens
2016	5	Wendy Askew	Liberal
2016	6	Helen Polley	Labor

== Territories ==
=== Australian Capital Territory ===
2019 Australian federal election: Senate, Australian Capital Territory
Party	Candidate	Votes	%	±%
Quota		90,078		
Labor	1. Katy Gallagher (elected 1); 2. Nancy Waites	106,330	39.35	+1.41
Liberal	1. Zed Seselja (elected 2); 2. Robert Gunning	87,492	32.38	−0.83
Greens	1. Penny Kyburz; 2. Emma Davidson	47,855	17.71	+1.61
Group C	1. Anthony Pesec; 2. Gary Kent	12,604	4.66	+4.66
United Australia	1. Peter Walter; 2. Rebecah Hodgson	6,130	2.27	+2.27
Sustainable Australia	1. John Haydon; 2. Joy Angel	4,463	1.65	+0.60
Conservative National	1. Shane van Duren; 2. Scott Birkett	2,461	0.91	+0.91
Ungrouped	Nick Houston; Gary Cowton; David Kim	2,896	1.07	+0.67
Total formal votes		270,231	97.68	−0.11
Informal votes		6,420	2.32	+0.11
Turnout		276,651	93.51	+1.14

Elected	#	Senator	Party
2019	1	Katy Gallagher	Labor
2019	2	Zed Seselja	Liberal

=== Northern Territory ===
2019 Australian federal election: Senate, Northern Territory
Party	Candidate	Votes	%	±%
Quota		35,010		
Labor	1. Malarndirri McCarthy (elected 1); 2. Wayne Kurnorth	39,353	37.47	+0.03
Country Liberal	1. Sam McMahon (elected 2); 2. Joshua Burgoyne	38,513	36.67	+0.25
Greens	1. Anna Sri; 2. Lia Gill	10,752	10.24	−0.54
United Australia	1. Michael Wolf; 2. Ross McRobert	6,469	6.16	+6.16
HEMP	1. Andrew Kavasilas; 2. Lance Lawrence	4,027	3.83	+3.83
Conservative National	1. Jan Pile; 2. Leslie Harris	2,207	2.10	+2.10
Rise Up Australia	1. Carol Ordish; 2. John Ordish	1,955	1.86	−4.77
Group D	1. Braedon Early; 2. Crystal Johnson	1,290	1.23	+1.23
Citizens Electoral Council	1. Trudy Campbell; 2. Ian Barry	461	0.44	−0.79
Total formal votes		105,027	96.36	−0.31
Informal votes		3,967	3.64	+0.31
Turnout		108,994	78.21	−1.07

Elected	#	Senator	Party
2019	1	Malarndirri McCarthy	Labor
2019	2	Sam McMahon	CLP
