= Alan Dixon =

Alan Dixon may refer to:

- Alan J. Dixon, American politician from Illinois
- Alan Dixon (cricketer), English cricketer
- Alan Dixon, Australian businessman and investor with Dixon Advisory
