= Peter Georgiou =

Australian politician (born 1974)

Senator for Western Australia
- In office 27 March 2017 – 30 June 2019
- Preceded by: Rod Culleton

Party Whip of Pauline Hanson's One Nation in the Senate
- In office 24 May 2018 – 30 June 2019
- Leader: Pauline Hanson
- Preceded by: Brian Burston

Personal details
- Born: Panagiotis Georgiou; 13 January 1974 (age 52) Perth, Western Australia, Australia
- Citizenship: Australian
- Party: One Nation
- Relations: Rod Culleton (brother-in-law)
- Occupation: Electrical construction contracting director (Self-employed)
- Profession: Businessman politician
- Website: https://www.petergeorgiouwa.com/

Panagiotis "Peter" Georgiou (born 13 January 1974) is a former Australian politician, who served as a Senator for Western Australia between 2017 and 2019. He was the second candidate on the Senate ticket for Pauline Hanson's One Nation party in the 2016 Australian federal election. The lead candidate on the ticket was Rod Culleton, Georgiou's brother-in-law. Culleton was declared to have been elected to the Senate when the writs were returned. However, the High Court, sitting as the Court of Disputed Returns, ruled on 3 February 2017 that Culleton had been ineligible to be elected at the time of the election. A consequence of that ruling was that a special recount of the votes was undertaken, as if Culleton had not been on the ballot, and Georgiou was elected in his place. Georgiou was sworn in as a Senator on 27 March 2017.

On 2017 when Cory Bernardi moved a motion to ban abortion on gender grounds, Georgiou was one of the ten who voted 'Yes' to the motion. It was voted down, 10–36.

In May 2018, he was promoted to party whip. He was defeated at the 2019 election.

== See also ==
- Members of the Australian Senate, 2016–2019
- Official Website
