= Daryl Dixon (economic writer) =

Australian economic writer and consultant (born 1942)

Daryl Albert Dixon (born 26 June 1942 in Bundaberg, Queensland) is an Australian economic and investment writer and consultant. Presently the Executive Chairman of Dixon Advisory and Superannuation Services, he writes regular columns on personal investing, economic commentary and self managed superannuation in The Canberra Times, Australian Financial Review, The Australian and the former Smart Investor magazine.

== Education ==
He attended Bundaberg State High School and Queensland University graduating in economics, and at Cambridge University on a Shell Postgraduate Scholarship to Clare College gaining a further degree with First Class Honours.

== Career ==
Two years as Associate Professor of Economics at the University of Calgary, Canada and then lecturing in Economics at the Australian National University (ANU). He was seconded from the ANU to the Department of the Treasury (6 months), then three years with the International Monetary Fund (IMF) in Washington DC focusing on taxation issues in Thailand, Kenya, Barbados and Swaziland all resulting in detailed reports.

As a consultant to Treasury he worked on a Taxation Review and in various public service positions in taxation and public finance. Key roles included Research Director of the Committee of Inquiry into Inflation and Taxation (chaired by Professor Russell Mathews) and assisting Professor Trevor Swan with the Review of the personal income tax system for the 1975–76 Hayden Budget.

From 1978 until 1986, he was Policy Co-ordinator for the Social Welfare Policy Secretariat and continued as Head of this Policy Co-ordination Unit. Significant policy papers and reports include Alternative strategies to meet the income needs of the aged and Tax credits and reform of the tax and social security systems.

From 1986, he has been an independent writer and consultant. He has worked for the Australian Commission for the Future comparing the savings policies of Australia and Singapore.

Daryl also worked as a consultant to the Social Welfare Policy branch of the Brotherhood of St Laurence producing significant published discussion papers including The way ahead in fiscal policy.

In 1986 Daryl began writing the many newspaper articles and published books on personal investment, taxation and superannuation for which he became widely known in Australia.

In 1986 Daryl started Dixon Advisory, then Daryl Dixon Writer and Consultant.

In 2007 there was a playful reference in The Canberra Times newspaper to his understanding of superannuation in Australia which claimed that there were only three people who really understood super in Australia – "one is dead, one went mad and the other is Daryl Dixon". (A play on words from Lord Palmerston who is reported to have said: “Only three people have ever really understood the Schleswig-Holstein business—the Prince Consort, who is dead, a German professor, who has gone mad, and I, who have forgotten all about it.")

In 2012, The Strategic Super Investor magazine made Daryl the subject of their annual in Focus profile.

Daryl Dixon continues to write for the Australian press on economic, superannuation and investment issues.

Dixon Advisory collapsed in 2022 after multiple compensation claims and three legal actions were launched against it in the year prior.

== Publications ==
Books include:

- Dixon, Daryl (5 June 2012), Securing your superannuation future : how to start and run a self-managed super fund, John Wiley & Sons, ISBN 978-0-7303-7778-8
- Dixon, Daryl (2000), Super strategies for the 21st century : post GST, Information Australia, ISBN 978-1-86350-316-7
- Dixon, Daryl; Flack, George (1994), How to retire – & live well : increasing income and protecting assets, Business Library, ISBN 978-1-86350-167-5
- Dixon, Daryl; Brotherhood of St. Laurence; Monash University. Public Sector Management Institute (1993), Superannuation : the costs and benefits, Brotherhood of St Laurence and Public Sector Management Institute, Monash University, ISBN 978-0-947081-61-4
- Dixon, Daryl; Brotherhood of St. Laurence (1992), Unemployment : the economic and social costs (2nd ed.), Brotherhood of St Laurence, ISBN 978-0-947081-57-7
- Dixon, Daryl; Brotherhood of St. Laurence; Monash University. Public Sector Management Institute (1991), The way ahead in fiscal policy : discussion paper, Brotherhood of St. Laurence & Public Sector Management Institute, Monash University, ISBN 978-0-947081-47-8
- Dixon, Daryl; Flack, George (1990), The Australian pensions guide : how to get the age or service pension and maximise your benefits, Investment Library, ISBN 978-1-86350-046-3
- Dixon, Daryl; Martyn, Barry (1989), The new super made easy : your guide to superannuation as investment ([New ed.] ed.), Australian Investment Library, ISBN 978-1-86337-003-5

Journal and magazine articles include:

- Dixon, Daryl; Walsh, Max (2010–2012), "Purchasing Residential Property in Your SMSF", Equity, 24 (12): 17, ISSN 1323-5303
- Dixon, Daryl (29 October 2002), "Win and bear it: the bear market offers big tax advanteages for DIY super funds, explains Daryl Dixon", The Bulletin with Newsweek, 120 (6348), A C P Computer Publications: 79(1), ISSN 1440-7485
- Dixon, Daryl (11 June 2002), "Credits squeeze: a campaign by the Australian Bankers Association for a cut in upfront superannuation taxes threatens the imputation credit system, of which the banks are a big beneficiary, writes Daryl Dixon", The Bulletin with Newsweek, 120 (6328), A C P Computer Publications: 49(1), ISSN 1440-7485
- Dixon, Daryl (20 November 2001), "Battler boost: the re-election of the Coalition government may be bad news for the superannuation industry but, as Daryl Dixon reports, it's the bee's knees for low income earners.(Illustration) (Statistical Data Included)", The Bulletin with Newsweek, 119 (6302), A C P Computer Publications: 76(1), ISSN 1440-7485
- Dixon, Daryl (July 1991), "The tax file", Australasian Catholic Record, 68 (3): 314–317, ISSN 0727-3215
- Dixon, Daryl (May 1991), "The Tax fix. -Changes to tax systems to encourage investment and savings and equity to the poor-", Independent Monthly (May 1991): 13
- Dixon, Daryl (June 1988), "The corporate tax breaks", Australian Accountant, 58 (5): 33–35, ISSN 0004-8631
- Dixon, Daryl (October 1987), "Tax shelters: the $6 billion story", Australian Society, 6 (10): 14–16

Newspaper articles include:

- Dixon, Daryl (1 December 2012). "UniSuper members fear fund shortfall". The Australian. Australia: News Limited. ISSN 1038-8761.
- Sydney Morning Herald supplement on the 1998 Mini-Budget, Labor's strategy opens way for flat tax system, Tax reform on the cheap and Mortgage-holder the losers, (13 April 1989), Sydney Morning Herald, p. 2s
