= Rod Bower (activist) =

Australian Anglican priest and social activist

The Venerable Rod Bower
- Born: 1962 (age 63–64); Newcastle, New South Wales
- Occupation: Priest
- Employer: Anglican church
- Known for: Human rights activism Criticism of the Christian right
- Political party: Independents For Climate Action Now

Rodney Scott Bower (born 1962) is an Australian Anglican priest and social activist. He was formerly the Rector of Gosford, on the New South Wales Central Coast, and Archdeacon for Justice Ministries and Chaplaincy in the Anglican Diocese of Newcastle, and is now their Director of Mission. He is most known for his church signs that advocate progressive causes.

== Theology ==
Bower has said:

"When we explore, perhaps, what I mean when I use the word 'God' we can come close to a common ground [with atheists] because I'm not talking about some divine being. God is the very act of existing. And so there's a point of meeting for atheists and people of faith. I don't really believe in Heaven and Hell at least not in the traditional sense. If there is a Heaven it must be a bit like Mardi Gras."

== Activism ==
Bower is known for his controversial political activism in which he promotes progressive causes through the Gosford Anglican church's message sign. He has promoted issues relating to gay marriage, refugee rights, gun control, anti-nationalism, and anti-Rupert Murdoch's media monopoly. Bower also supports abortion. He says euthanasia should be considered and that there is a need for illicit drug testing.

He has stated his views have been inspired by the liberation theology proponent Dom Helder Camara.

Bower first began his activism in 2013 when he put up, "DEAR CHRISTIANS, SOME PPL ARE GAY. GET OVER IT. LOVE GOD" after delivering the last rites to a dying man whose family hid the man's partner due to fear of the church's stance on homosexuality. After an image of the sign became popular online, he continued using it as a method of activism. In 2014, he began participating in the Sydney Gay and Lesbian Mardi Gras wearing his clerical attire.

Israel Folau quoted from the Bible, 1 Corinthians 6:9-10. Bower says, "FOLAU IS WRONG, DON'T LISTEN TO HIM". Bower, along with others, set up a GoFundMe page in response to one set up by Folau.

In 2017, Bower was criticised for a Gosford Anglican church sign, referring to Peter Dutton, the Australian immigration minister, which said, "DUTTON IS A SODOMITE". Bower stated he was referring to the biblical story of Sodom, which in his interpretation was "about hospitality, or more to the point lack thereof, and particularly about the condition of the heart that leads to inhospitable behaviour". However, there is an alternative Biblical explanation for the word 'sodomite' from that articulated by Bower. The assistant archbishop of Melbourne said the term Sodomite was, "a very personal slur on a government minister".

In 2017, Bower chained himself to Kirribilli House to protest the Manus Island detention centres.

His controversial signs relating to multiculturalism and anti-nationalism has led to counter-demonstrations by right-wing groups. In 2016, The Party for Freedom interrupted his service clothed in Islamic dress to protest his "social justice agenda". In April 2018, after putting up a sign stating "Lest we forget Manus & Nauru", he received a threat by a member of the Australian Defence Force that they would "set that church on fire". Later in the same year, a group interrupted the service wielding fake weaponry.

In 2016, Bower was criticised by Andrew Bolt for his relationship with the Grand Mufti of Australia, Ibrahim Abu Mohamed, who had called homosexuality an "evil act". In 2019, Bower was criticised by the Australian Jewish Association for comparing the Nauru processing centre to the Holocaust.

== Political career ==
In 2018, Bower announced he would run in the 2019 federal election for a New South Wales senate seat "to give a voice to the marginalised". He has expressed an emphasis on policies surrounding "climate change, refugees and basic human rights". Bower ran under the Independents For Climate Action Now party ticket in New South Wales, receiving only 0.6% of the vote and was not elected.

== Bibliography ==
- Outspoken: Because Justice is Always Social (Sydney: Ebury Australia, 2018)
