= The Together Party =

- Abbreviation: Together
- Founder: Mark Swivel
- Founded: 4 April 2019; 5 years ago
- Ideology: Social democracy
- Political position: Centre-left
- Colors: Purple & Yellow
- Slogan: Rebuilding our Common Wealth

Website
- thetogetherparty.org.au

The Together Party was an Australian political party founded in 2018. It advocated policies to restore "Government in the public interest".

Founder Mark Swivel is a lawyer, performer and writer based in Mullumbimby, New South Wales. He is the company secretary at Enova Energy, and an Ambassador for the microfinance non-profit Good Return. He is one of the party's three candidates for senators to represent New South Wales at the 2019 Australian federal election.

== History ==
The Together Party was registered on 4 April 2019. The 550 minimum initial membership requirement was met within a period of several weeks through word-of-mouth on social media.

The Together Party fielded three candidates to represent New South Wales in the Australian Senate at the 2019 Australian federal election: Mark Swivel, Belinda Kinkead, engineer, and Kate McDowell, writer and performer. The party polled 6,127 votes, a total of 0.13% of the state's Senate vote.

The party was deregistered on 30 June 2021 for failing to meet the requirements of having 500 members.

== Manifesto ==
The Together Party says it campaigns for the restoration of Government in the public interest, as a constructive force for positive change across Australian society.

== Policies ==
The Together Party says it has policies that aim to make three broad changes:

- Re-prioritise taxation and government spending to better invest in education, renewables, small business, health, and climate.
- Bolster the people's voice, agency for Indigenous Australians, NGOs, the arts, the representation of women in parliament, workers’ rights, and corporate social responsibility.
- Build greater accountability in government through transparent governing (including dealings with businesses, consultants, lobbyists), strengthening the public service, re-nationalising failing NGO service providers, establishing anti-corruption and water allocation watchdogs, and moving Australia towards becoming a republic.
