= EMILY's List Australia =

Women's political action organisation in Australia

- Formation: 1996
- Founder: Joan Kirner; Carmen Lawrence
- Founded at: Canberra, Australia
- Type: Nonprofit Incorporated Association
- Registration no.: A0033881F
- Headquarters: Queen Victoria Women's Centre; 210 Lonsdale Street, Melbourne, Australia
- Co-Convenors: Sharon Claydon; Leigh Svendsen
- Chief Executive Officer: Pamela Anderson
- Key people: Marjorie O'Neill (NSW Co-convenor); Meg Brown (Tas Co-convenor); Katrina Stratton (WA Co-convenor); Sonja Terpstra (VIC Co-convenor)
- Affiliations: Australian Labor Party
- Website: emilyslist.org.au

EMILY's List Australia is a political network in Australia that supports progressive Labor Party (ALP) women candidates seeking election to political office. Founded in 1996, EMILY's List Australia was inspired by EMILY's List, a political action committee with similar goals in the United States.

Issues central to the organisation's support of candidates are the principles of equity, diversity, reproductive rights, and the provision of equal pay and childcare. The organisation supports candidates through directed donations, "Early Money" financial support, gender gap research and volunteer support. Over 284 EMILY's List members had been elected to state and federal Australian Parliaments as of 2013.

== Etymology ==
The name EMILY comes from its United States equivalent and is an acronym for "Early Money Is Like Yeast" from the political saying, "Early money is like yeast, because it helps to raise the dough".

== History ==
=== 1990s ===
On 26 November 1994, at Fire with Fire: The Feminist Forum held at the Sydney Town Hall, Joan Kirner mentioned the plan currently before the ALP National Executive to introduce an Australian version of the US Emily's List.

In 1994, the ALP National Conference passed an Affirmative Action Rule requiring that women be pre-selected in 35 per cent of winnable seats, in all elections, by 2002. This was at the same time as passing of the Affirmative Action (Equal Employment Opportunity for Women) Act 1986. In 1995 the ALP decided to form an internal version of EMILY's List, and in 1996 Kirner established EMILY's List Australia outside the party. with the aim of attaining 45% female membership in both the House of Representatives and the Senate.

=== 2000s ===
In the 2004 Federal Election campaign EMILY's List donated a total of $100,000 to candidates. Research conducted by EMILY's List and submitted to the Labor Party's national executive stated that Labor women regarded then health spokeswoman Julia Gillard as the best performer during the campaign, with then Prime Minister John Howard in second place. Of Mark Latham their submission stated; "the most common themes were: perceived aggression, concern he had been watered down for the campaign, inexperience, constantly going on about background, glib answers, bully boy tactics of the past."

=== 2010–present ===
In the 2010 Federal Election campaign EMILY's List undertook Gender Gap research in six key marginal seats and undertook a targeted campaign incorporating materials along the themes of 'We Can't Trust Tony', 'Let's Make History' and 'Torpedo the Speedo'.

In the 2012 Australian Capital Territory and Northern Territory elections, for the first time EMILY's List endorsed every female Labor Party candidate contesting those elections.

Australia's first female prime minister, Julia Gillard, was a founding member of EMILY's List Australia and assisted to prepare their initial constitution. She presented the Inaugural EMILY's List Oration at Parliament House, Canberra in September 2011.

== Organisational structure ==
EMILY's List Australia is run by a National Committee which includes parliamentarians, volunteers and women unionists. Although it is a partisan organisation, is not controlled by the formal structures of the ALP. At the State and Territory level there are "Action Groups" (ELAG) which have their own organisational structures. Sharon Claydon, Member of the Australian House of Representatives and Leigh Svendsen are currently the National Co-convenors.

== See also ==
- Women and government in Australia
- Women in the Australian House of Representatives
- Women in the Australian Senate
