= Rod Culleton =

Australian politician (born 1964)

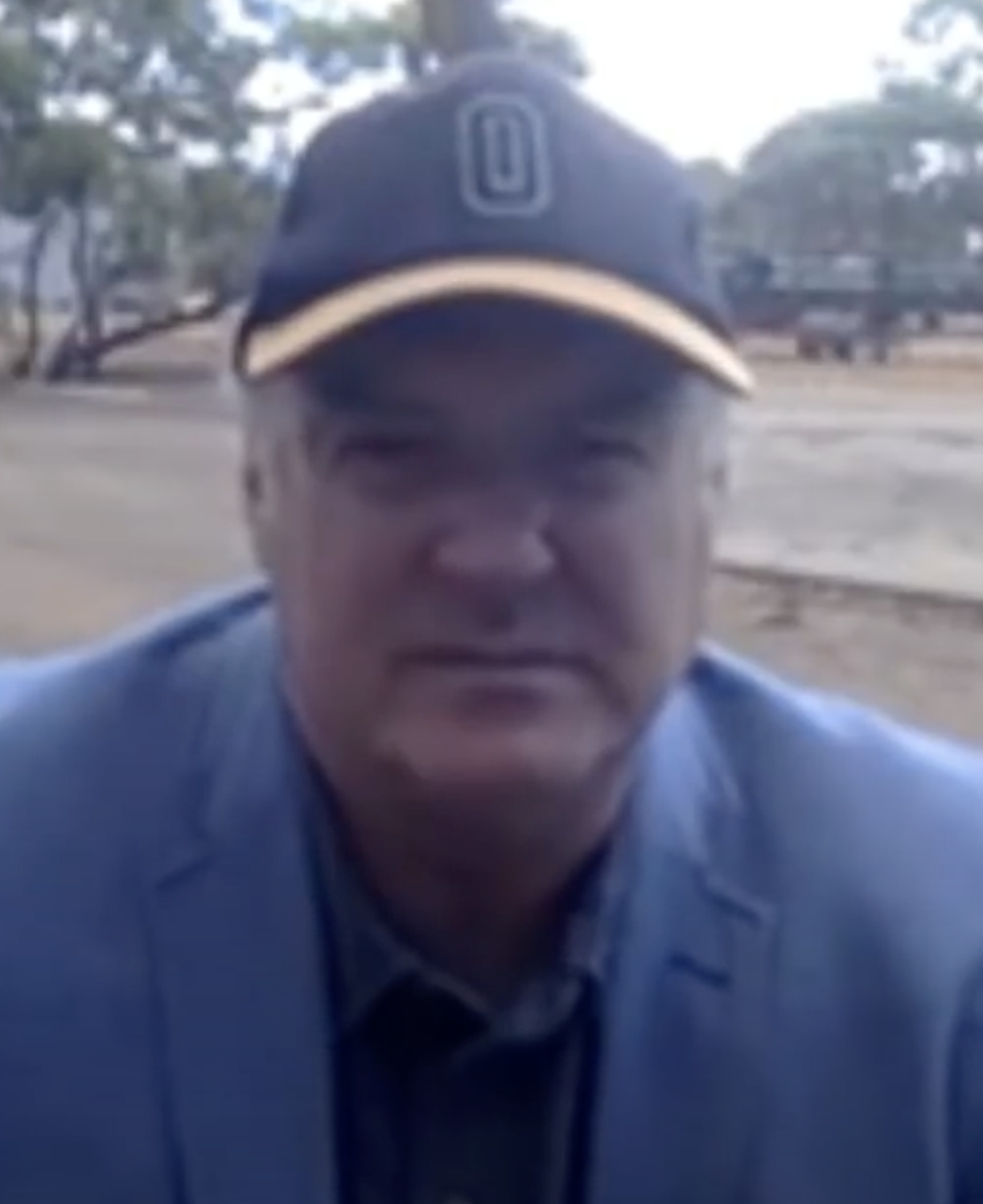

Leader of The Great Australian Party
- Incumbent
- Assumed office 7 April 2019
- Preceded by: Position established

Senator for Western Australia
- In office 2 July 2016 – 11 January 2017
- Preceded by: Zhenya Wang
- Succeeded by: Peter Georgiou

Personal details
- Born: Rodney Norman Culleton (Note: Culleton appeared on the ballot at the 2025 federal election as Rodney "Cullerton" as that is how he has spelt his name on the electoral roll.); 5 June 1964 (age 62) Narrogin, Western Australia, Australia
- Party: The Great Australian Party (since 2019)
- Other political affiliations: One Nation (2015–16); Independent (2016)
- Spouse: Ioanna Georgiou
- Children: 3
- Relatives: Peter Georgiou (brother-in-law)
- Education: Narrogin Senior High School
- Alma mater: Challenger Institute of Technology
- Occupation: Corporate grain agriculturer (Self-employed); Purchasing agent (AWB Limited)
- Website: senatorculleton.com.au

Rodney Norman Culleton (born 5 June 1964) is an Australian politician who was sworn in and sat as a Senator for Western Australia following the 2016 federal election. At that time he was a member of the Pauline Hanson's One Nation party, but on 18 December 2016 he resigned from the party to sit as an independent.

On 23 December 2016 the Federal Court of Australia held that Culleton was bankrupt. On 11 January 2017 the President of the Senate, Stephen Parry, wrote to the Governor of Western Australia, Kerry Sanderson, advising her that as a result of Culleton's bankruptcy his seat in the Senate was vacant. Culleton disputed the effect of the court's order and claimed still to be a Senator. His appeal against the bankruptcy order, to the Full Court of the Federal Court, was dismissed on 3 February 2017. On the same day, the High Court determined that Culleton had, in any case, been ineligible for election to the Senate due to a criminal matter in New South Wales. The Senate vacancy left by Culleton was later filled by his brother-in-law Peter Georgiou, One Nation's second Senate candidate for WA in the 2016 election, after an official recount.

Culleton established The Great Australian Party in April 2019.

== Senate ==
Culleton was declared as elected as a Senator for Western Australia on 2 July 2016 as the lead candidate on the Pauline Hanson's One Nation ticket during the 2016 election. At the time he had been convicted in absentia on a larceny charge over a vehicle key in New South Wales, but had not yet been sentenced.

On 18 December 2016 Culleton announced on Twitter that he had resigned from One Nation, citing a lack of party support and "un-Australian behaviour". Party leader Pauline Hanson responded that Culleton had been "a pain in my backside" and that she was "glad to see the back of him".

== Debt and legal proceedings ==
Culleton was involved in a long and complex history of legal proceedings in relation to claims he owed money to a number of different companies.

- Macquarie Leasing Pty Ltd obtained a judgment in the WA District Court against Culleton in March 2013 for $94,304. In 2014 Culleton was bankrupted over this debt, however in 2015 the bankruptcy was set aside by consent. (Note: Because the judgment was by consent, it is not known what were considered to be the arguable grounds of appeal.)
- In May 2013 Permanent Custodians, part of the ANZ Bank group, foreclosed on the Culletons' farm which was near Williams, Western Australia, obtaining judgment against the Culletons for $4,672,859 plus interest. The Culletons unsuccessfully attempted to have this set aside, in 2014, and 2016. Culleton referred to his dispute with the ANZ Bank in his submissions to a Parliamentary Joint Committee, and in his first speech to the Senate.
- Elite Grains, a company associated with Culleton had been placed in liquidation and the report to creditors said that Elite Grains had $5.4 million in secured debt, $656,000 in unsecured liabilities and that "There will not be a dividend to any class of creditor in this liquidation".
- Balwyn Nominees, a company associated with former Wesfarmers director Dick Lester, obtained judgement against the Culletons for $205,536 plus interest in 2013. The Culletons have unsuccessfully attempted to overturn this judgment in WA Courts in 2015, 2016, and 2017. In 2016 Culleton commenced proceedings in the Federal Court seeking to overturn the judgment but the application was dismissed as being erroneous and "entirely unarguable".

=== Creditors petition and bankruptcy ===
Balwyn Nominees sought an order in the Federal Court that Culleton be made bankrupt. On 23 December 2016, after a tumultuous hearing, the Federal Court rejected Culleton's application for trial by jury, found that the technical requirements of the Bankruptcy Act had been met and held Culleton's various other submissions were unarguable and totally without merit. The court ordered sequestration of Culleton's assets, with the effect of declaring him bankrupt. The court granted a 21-day stay on proceedings under the sequestration order, with Culleton announcing that he would appeal the decision. Culleton's appeal was dismissed by a full court of the Federal Court on 3 February 2017 (see below).

Under Sections 44 and 45 of the Constitution of Australia, a Senator who faces an undischarged bankruptcy during his term automatically forfeits his seat. After receiving an official copy of the trial judgment from the Federal Court as well as documentation from the Inspector-General in Bankruptcy, on 11 January the President of the Senate, Stephen Parry, wrote to the Governor of Western Australia, Kerry Sanderson, to notify her that Culleton's seat had become vacant due to his having become an undischarged bankrupt on 23 December 2016. Parry added that, since the matter of initial ineligibility was still before the High Court sitting as the Court of Disputed Returns, he was currently unable to advise that the ordinary procedure for filling a casual vacancy (section 15 of the Constitution) applied and he would provide further advice following the Court's decision, expected "in the near future". Culleton immediately announced that he would lodge a High Court challenge to the President's ruling as "premature" since the 21-day stay was to run until 13 January.

On 12 January, the Federal Court extended the stay of proceedings under the sequestration orders by one week. Culleton maintained that it was also a stay of the declaration of bankruptcy, so that he continued to be a Senator. However, he was already listed on the Parliament website as a "former Senator". On 19 January it was reported that Culleton's lawyer had received a letter from Parry's office which warned that, in continuing to identify himself as a Senator, Culleton could be committing the serious offence of impersonating a public official, and that in response Culleton had amended his parliamentary Facebook page to read "Rod Culleton – 'Senator' for WA – Gone Fishin'", and changed the signature on his parliamentary emails to "Rod Culleton | Federal Senator for Western Australia (Gone Fishin')". On 31 January 2017, Justice Gageler in the High Court rejected challenges by Culleton to the Court's jurisdiction and to Parry's decision.

On 3 February 2017, the full court of the Federal Court unanimously dismissed Culleton's appeal against the sequestration order. It rejected Culleton's claim that the trial judge had treated him unfairly, finding that the judge had dealt properly with his "unfocused and erratic" submissions. It also rejected his argument that a sequestration order does not necessarily involve a finding of bankruptcy, confirming that "insolvency, not judgment execution or debt collection, is the essence of an application for a sequestration order". Culleton unsuccessfully sought a stay of the sequestration order in the High Court.

== Criminal charges ==
In April 2014 Culleton was involved in a dispute with a tow truck driver in Guyra, NSW. The tow truck driver was attempting to repossess a truck and the key to the tow truck was lost. Culleton was charged with larceny in relation to the missing key. When the matter came before the local court in March 2016 Culleton was not present, saying he did not have time to travel to the Court as he was required to be in court in WA the day before on unrelated larceny charges (see below). Culleton was convicted in his absence. He successfully applied to set aside the conviction, with the conviction being annulled on 8 August 2016. Culleton then pleaded guilty to the offence, and was ordered to pay the truck driver's costs but a conviction was not recorded.

A second, unrelated, larceny charge, concerning a hire car in Western Australia in March 2015. The allegations are that receivers had attended the property of Mr Dixon near Cuballing, Western Australia, with the ANZ Bank alleging he had defaulted on a loan. While the receivers were inside the farm house talking to Mr Dixon, the hire car was blocked in by hay bales. The car was subsequently moved and it is alleged that Culleton tried to obtain a key. While the charge was expected to be heard in August 2016, it was listed to be heard in the Perth Magistrates Court over a four-day period, in September 2017. When the case was heard, Culleton represented himself, shouted at the magistrate and threw his eyeglasses in her direction (they hit a table); a police officer removed him from the court, but he apologised to the court and was allowed to return to cross-examine witnesses. However, since the case was set to run for only one more day and there were a large number of witnesses, the hearing was adjourned until 2018.

In March 2022, Culleton was charged with breaching quarantine directions during the COVID-19 pandemic in Western Australia. He appeared in the Kalgoorlie Magistrate's Court on 4 April 2022. He did not enter a plea and indicated that he intended to elevate the case to the High Court of Australia on constitutional grounds. He was granted four weeks adjournment.

== Senate ineligibility ==
Under section 44(ii) of the Constitution, any person who "has been convicted and is under sentence, or subject to be sentenced, for any offence punishable under the law of the Commonwealth or of a State by imprisonment for one year or longer" is "incapable of being chosen or of sitting" in either house of Parliament. Previous time in prison was not a disqualification and there have been numerous politicians who had spent time in prison before their election. The High Court had previously observed that the disqualification is not simply for the conviction for an offence, nor serving time in prison. The disqualification required both conviction and that the person was imprisoned at the time or awaiting sentence. The WA larceny charge did not give rise to any question of disqualification as Culleton had only been charged and had not been convicted. At the time of Culleton's nomination and election, he had been convicted for the New South Wales offence but had not been sentenced. A former colleague lodged a petition with the High Court (sitting as the Court of Disputed Returns), claiming that Culleton was not able to nominate for the election as he was convicted and awaiting sentence in New South Wales at the time of the election. Subsequently, the Australian Government asked the Senate to also refer the matter to the High Court; the reference included a request to determine what should be done if Culleton's seat were found to be vacant. The primary issues before the High Court concerned the effect of the subsequent annulment of Culleton's conviction and whether Culleton was subject to be sentenced to a term of imprisonment for one year or longer.

On 3 February 2017, the High Court determined the Senate reference, unanimously finding that Culleton had been ineligible for election to the Senate. At the time of the 2016 election he was subject to being sentenced to imprisonment for up to two years, which under Constitution section 44(ii) rendered him ineligible for election. This had not been affected by the subsequent annulment of the finding of guilt; the annulment had operated only from the time of the annulment. The vacancy should be filled by a special count of the ballot papers. Any directions necessary to give effect to the conduct of the special count should be made by a single Justice. However, the Court anticipated that a simple recount, as if Culleton had not been a candidate, would make the votes cast for him (so far as they were "above the line", which was 96% of them) would flow through to the next One Nation candidate. The Court ordered, as the Commonwealth had previously agreed, that most (with specific exceptions) of Culleton's costs of the action would be borne by the Commonwealth (Culleton had initially represented himself, but eventually he had been provided with counsel).

The majority stated, in an introductory summary of their judgment (with which Nettle J differed only as to reasoning):

Senator Culleton was a person who had been convicted and was subject to be sentenced for an offence punishable by imprisonment for one year or longer at the date of the 2016 election. That was so, both as a matter of fact and as a matter of law. The subsequent annulment of the conviction had no effect on that state of affairs. It follows from s 44(ii) that Senator Culleton was "incapable of being chosen" as a Senator. In the result, there is a vacancy in the representation of Western Australia in the Senate for the place for which Senator Culleton was returned.

The beneficiary of the recount, as determined by the High Court on 10 March 2017, was Culleton's brother-in-law, Peter Georgiou.

When the Senate resumed on 7 February, the President of the Senate, Stephen Parry, informed the house of the High Court's decision that Culleton had been ineligible to nominate for the Senate, rendering his election void. Parry stated that this did not invalidate any Senate proceedings in which Culleton had taken part, by reference to the High Court decision in Vardon v O'Loghlin. He added that any salary paid to Culleton as a Senator had been paid without authority and accordingly was now a debt due to the Commonwealth; and that whether any of that debt should be waived was a decision for the government, on which Parry had sought advice from the finance minister.

In May 2017, Culleton was informed by the Commonwealth Department of Finance that "payments made to you and in relation to you since the election on 2 July 2016 are a debt to the commonwealth" and might include superannuation payments, other entitlements and staff payments. Culleton was invited to consider his options, which could include providing evidence of his financial circumstances. Culleton told media that he would not be answering the Department's letter. "I'm just going to hang in like a flea in between the shoulder blades of a dog", he said, "right where it can't scratch." Special Minister of State Scott Ryan confirmed that this department, as well as the Senate, had so written to Culleton and also to disqualified Family First Senator Bob Day; he indicated that they could apply for the debts to be waived. Culleton commented that he intended to appeal the High Court judgment against him to the Privy Council: on being reminded that this has been virtually impossible since the Australia Act 1986, he said that he disagreed.

On 8 August 2017 the President of the Senate reported that he had received correspondence from Culleton's lawyers "requesting the Senate to refer matters relating to Mr Culleton back to the High Court for reconsideration" and added, "I am advised that the Senate has no power to comply with this request."

In July 2018, Culleton applied to the High Court to reopen its earlier decision that found him ineligible to sit as a senator. He argued that the Senate lacked a quorum when it referred his case to the Court of Disputed Returns. On 10 August 2018, the High Court dismissed the application and ordered him to pay costs.

== The Great Australian Party ==
In 2018, Culleton initiated the process to establish a new political party, The Great Australian Party, to stand candidates for the Senate in the 2019 Australian federal election. He continued to refer to himself as a "senator-in-exile" and sought to appeal his disqualification to the Privy Council of the United Kingdom. Other policies of the proposed party were to remove personal income tax, nationalise the Commonwealth Bank and abolish the Family Court of Australia. The party was formally registered by the Australian Electoral Commission on 7 April 2019.

Culleton became the party's lead candidate for the Senate in Western Australia in the May 2019 election. His nomination was immediately referred to the Australian Federal Police to clarify the possibility that he had made a false declaration on his nomination form. The party recorded 0.2% of the vote, coming 19th of the 23 contesting parties and falling well short of electing a candidate.

During the 2022 Australian federal election Culleton again nominated to stand for the Senate as the leader of the Great Australian Party. The Australian Electoral Commission issued a statement noting that he may be ineligible to stand as he is listed as an undischarged bankrupt and referred the matter to the Australian Federal Police for investigation. In September 2022, Culleton was charged with giving false information to the AEC when he nominated for the Senate as a candidate for The Great Australian Party. It was alleged that Culleton was listed as an "undischarged bankrupt" on the National Personal Insolvency Index in April 2022, which would make him ineligible for election. After he failed to appear in the Perth Magistrates Court on 30 September, an arrest warrant for him was issued. Speaking in New South Wales, Culleton said the claim he was bankrupt was "absolutely nonsense" and that he had never been bankrupt in the past.

== 2025 federal election ==
At the 2025 Australian federal election Culleton once again nominated to stand for election to the Senate. The Australian Electoral Commission issued a statement that it had again referred his nomination to the Australian Federal Police but that notwithstanding the irregularity of his nomination, his name would appear on ballot papers.

Culleton failed in his bid to get elected. He was later convicted for lying on his nomination forms when he falsely stated he was not bankrupt.

== Personal life ==
Culleton is separated from wife Ioanna (née Georgiou) who is of Greek heritage. Her family came to Australia in the 1970s, when she was five years old. While a member of the One Nation Party, Culleton did not support the party position that multiculturalism had failed. He became an advocate for farmers after his own farm at Williams was foreclosed in 2013. Culleton is linked to at least three companies, including Elite Grains, that were in liquidation in 2016.
