= Michael Crouch (businessman) =

Chairman of Midgeon Holdings Pty Ltd. (1933-2018)

Michael Crouch AC
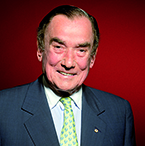
- Born: Michael Jenkins Crouch; 27 May 1933; Sydney, Australia
- Died: 9 February 2018 (aged 84)
- Occupation: Industrialist
- Children: 3

Michael Jenkins Crouch AC (27 May 1933 – 9 February 2018) was Chairman of Australian private company Midgeon Holdings Pty Ltd. Midgeon acted as a holding vehicle for his long-term investments which include interests in Australian manufacturing, beef production, meat processing and property. Until December 2013 he was also Executive Chairman of Zip Industries, a manufacturing company he founded following his acquisition in 1962 of Zip Heaters.

== Biography ==
In 1962 Michael Crouch acquired a small Australian company, Zip Heaters, which had been formed in 1947 to market kitchen and bathroom water heaters. Under his management, Zip expanded its product range to include a variety of hot water appliances and in the 1970s introduced the world's first small instant boiling water heaters now widely used in homes, offices and restaurant kitchens. From 1970, Zip also developed under-bench drinking water appliances dispensing both instant boiling water and chilled filtered drinking water. Newer models also dispense sparkling chilled filtered water.

From 1982, Crouch appointed Zip distributors in Singapore, Taiwan, the Philippines and Thailand to cover South-East Asia. A distributor for Great Britain was engaged in 1987, and Zip products were introduced to Europe at trade shows in 1989 and 1991. A wholly owned subsidiary was formed in 1991 to handle UK distribution, and a distributor for Europe was appointed in 2002. A Zip subsidiary to handle distribution in New Zealand was established in 1996, and a joint venture partner in South Africa handles African marketing.

Michael Crouch maintained his position as CEO of Zip until December 2013. From then until his death in 2018 he continued as Chairman of Midgeon Holdings Pty Ltd, an Australian private company acting as a holding vehicle for his long-term investments in Australian manufacturing, beef production, meat processing and property.

== Community ==
Michael was appointed (2008 - 2012) Board Director of the Duke of Edinburgh's International Award - Australia and from 2012 to his death was Vice President of The Friends of The Duke of Edinburgh Award in Australia. He became sponsor in 2008 and a Benefactor of the Award in 2012.

== Honours and awards ==
- 1988. Appointed Member of the Order of Australia (AM) for service to conservation and the community.
- 2001. Awarded Centenary Medal for "service to Australian society through international trade development".
- 2004. Appointed Officer of the Order of Australia (AO) for service to the manufacturing sector, to the development of export markets in the Asia-Pacific region and to the community through a range of conservation and charitable organizations.
- 2017. Appointed Companion of the Order of Australia (AC) for eminent service to the community through philanthropic contributions to youth, cultural, medical research and health care organisations, to business in the areas of manufacturing and international trade, and as a supporter of innovation and higher education.
- 2016. Gold Distinguished Service Medal, The Duke of Edinburgh's International Award - Australia

== Personal life ==
Michael Crouch died on 9 February 2018 and was survived by his wife, one son and two daughters.
