= Dixon Advisory =

Superfund provider in Australia

- Founded: 1986
- Founders: Daryl Dixon and Kate Dixon
- Defunct: 2022
- Fate: Voluntary insolvency
- Parent: Evans Dixon
- Website: www.dixon.com.au

Dixon Advisory was the fourth largest self-managed superfund provider in Australia, and a subsidiary of Evans Dixon. Founded in 1986, the company filed for voluntary administration in 2022.

== History ==
=== Founding and growth ===
Dixon Advisory was established by Daryl Dixon and his wife Kate Dixon in 1986 and served as executive chairman of the company. By 2000 the firm had grown to 350 employees. Dixon Advisory was the fourth largest self-managed super fund provider in Australia. In 2012, Daryl Dixon's son, Alan Dixon, assumed leadership of the company.

By 2015 the company had 4500 SMSFs under management, worth about $5 billion, and had around 8000 SMSF members. Dixon Advisory officials have also discussed national financial issues in the Australian media.

In 2017 the company merged with Evans & Partners into the company Evans Dixon, which became Dixon Advisory's parent company. The resulting company was a combined $18 billion wealth advisor firm. In 2018, its parent company was listed on the Australian Stock Exchange, raising $170 million in its IPO. After its first day of trading, the company had a $580.2 million market capitalization.

=== Investment in U.S. property market ===
In the mid 2010s, Dixon Advisory began operating its own investments for the first time, including creating and running United States-invested property funds. Many of its properties were located in Jersey City, New Jersey and, according to Jacobin, it was landlord to "scores of Jersey City renters".

The Dixon investments in the U.S. property market ultimately crashed, with some funds losing up to 90 percent of their value and the firm's investors claiming to have lost more than $350 million.

==== Political activity ====
The firm donated heavily to the political campaigns of Jersey City mayor Steven Fulop, including a $200,000 donation to a Fulop-aligned Super PAC. Fulop subsequently cancelled property value reassessments that threatened to raise taxes on Dixon Advisory-owned properties. The firm also helped renovate both the mayor's primary residence and his Rhode Island beach home for what one local real estate website estimated was almost at-cost. In a separate deal, Fulop arranged to purchase a "trophy" property from Dixon Advisory for his personal use that was never advertised to the public.

=== Insolvency ===
Alan Dixon stepped down from the company in 2019 and, in 2020, the Australian Securities and Investments Commission, initiated action in the Federal Court of Australia against the company, leading to a $7.2 million penalty against the firm for not acting in the best interest of its clients. In 2021, a class action lawsuit was filed against Dixon Advisory by investors who alleged they had lost significant sums of money due to its advice.

In 2022, it was announced that Dixon Advisory had filed for voluntary administration, with the company facing an increasing number of claims and potential liabilities. The company's former clients were expected to recoup their losses at four cents on the dollar after the liquidation of its assets.

== US business ==
In the United States, the company operated under the name Dixon Advisory USA. Investments included the purchase and renovation of residential property in New York City. Dixon Advisory USA has since been closed. The department previously oversaw a $590 million US Residential Masters Property fund.
