= Independents CAN =

- Abbreviation: ICAN
- Founder: Jim Tait
- Founded: 10 April 2019; 7 years ago
- Ideology: Climate change action

Website
- www.independentscan.com.au

Independents CAN, formerly Independents For Climate Action Now (ICAN), is an Australian political party which was registered on 10 April 2019. It seeks to prosecute policies relating to climate change, such as planning for climate change related emergencies and phasing out fossil fuels to replace with renewable energy.

In 2018, lead candidate Rod Bower announced the party would run in the 2019 federal election for a New South Wales senate seat "to give a voice to the marginalised". The party would emphase policies surrounding "climate change, refugees and basic human rights". The party did not win a seat, receiving 0.6% of all votes.

The party changed its name from "Independents for Climate Action Now" to "Independents CAN" in 2021. The party was de-registered on 12 January 2022 by the Australian Electoral Commission for failing to meet the increased registration requirement of 1500 members.
