= Candidates of the 2019 Australian federal election =

This is a list of candidates for the 2019 Australian federal election, held on 18 May 2019.

There were 1,514 candidates in total (1,056 for the House of Representatives and 458 for the Senate).

== Retiring members ==
Members of Parliament and Senators who chose not to renominate for the 2019 election were as follows:

=== Labor ===
- Gai Brodtmann MP (Canberra, ACT) – announced retirement 13 August 2018
- Michael Danby MP (Melbourne Ports, Vic) – announced retirement 5 July 2018
- Kate Ellis MP (Adelaide, SA) – announced retirement 9 March 2017
- Emma Husar MP (Lindsay, NSW) – announced retirement 11 April 2019
- Jenny Macklin MP (Jagajaga, Vic) – announced retirement 6 July 2018
- Wayne Swan MP (Lilley, Qld) – announced retirement 10 February 2018
- Senator Doug Cameron (NSW) – announced retirement 24 July 2016
- Senator Claire Moore (Qld) – announced retirement 31 July 2018

=== Liberal ===
- Julie Bishop MP (Curtin, WA) – announced retirement 21 February 2019
- Steven Ciobo MP (Moncrieff, Qld) – announced retirement 1 March 2019
- Michael Keenan MP (Stirling, WA) – announced retirement 25 January 2019
- Craig Laundy MP (Reid, NSW) – announced retirement 15 March 2019
- Kelly O'Dwyer MP (Higgins, Vic) – announced retirement 19 January 2019
- Jane Prentice MP (Ryan, Qld) – lost preselection 12 May 2018, delivered valedictory 4 April 2019
- Christopher Pyne MP (Sturt, SA) – announced retirement 2 March 2019
- Ann Sudmalis MP (Gilmore, NSW) – announced retirement 17 September 2018

=== Nationals ===
- Andrew Broad MP (Mallee, Vic) – announced retirement 18 December 2018
- Luke Hartsuyker MP (Cowper, NSW) – announced retirement 8 August 2018
- Senator Barry O'Sullivan (Qld) – lost preselection 6 July 2018
- Senator Nigel Scullion (NT) – announced retirement 26 January 2019
- Senator John Williams (NSW) – announced retirement 31 May 2016

=== Independent ===
- Cathy McGowan MP (Indi, Vic) – announced retirement 14 January 2019
- Senator Tim Storer (SA) – announced retirement 17 April 2019

== House of Representatives ==
Sitting members are listed in bold text. Successful candidates are highlighted in the relevant colour. Where there is possible confusion, an asterisk is used.

=== Australian Capital Territory ===
Electorate	Held by	Labor candidate	Liberal candidate	Greens candidate	UAP candidate	Progressive candidate	Other candidates
Bean	Labor (notional)	David Smith	Ed Cocks	Johnathan Davis	Tony Hanley	Therese Faulkner	Jamie Christie (Ind); Matt Donnelly (LDP); Ben Rushton (GAP)
Canberra	Labor	Alicia Payne	Mina Zaki	Tim Hollo	Greg De Maine	Robert Knight	Tim Bohm (Ind)
Fenner	Labor	**Andrew Leigh**	Leanne Castley	Andrew Braddock	Glen Hodgson	Kagiso Ratlhagane	

=== New South Wales ===
Electorate	Held by	Labor candidate	Coalition candidate	Greens candidate	UAP candidate	Other candidates
Banks	Liberal	Chris Gambian	**David Coleman** (Lib)	Gianluca Dragone	Reginald Wright	Ki Man Ho (CDP); Anjali Thakur (AJP)
Barton	Labor	**Linda Burney**	Pramej Shrestha (Lib)	Connor Parissis	Ben Liu	Phillip Pollard (PHON); Sonny Susilo (CDP)
Bennelong	Liberal	Brian Owler	**John Alexander** (Lib)	Qiu Yue Zhang	Andrew Marks	Julie Worsley (CDP)
Berowra	Liberal	Katie Gompertz	**Julian Leeser** (Lib)	Monica Tan	Craig McLachlan	Brendan Clarke (Sci); Mick Gallagher (Ind); Simon Taylor (CDP); Justin Thomas (Sus); Roger Woodward (Ind)
Blaxland	Labor	**Jason Clare**	Oz Guney (Lib)	James Rooney	Nadeem Ashraf	Veronica Rowe (CDP)
Bradfield	Liberal	Chris Haviland	**Paul Fletcher** (Lib)	Tony Adams	Marcus Versace	Stephen Molloy (Sus)
Calare	National	Jess Jennings	**Andrew Gee** (Nat)	Stephanie Luke	Beverley Cameron	Stephen Bisgrove (LDP); Shuyi Chen (CDP); Sam Romano (SFF)
Chifley	Labor	**Ed Husic**	Livingston Chettipally (Lib)	Brent Robertson	Joseph O'Connor	Josh Green (CDP); Ammar Khan (Ind)
Cook	Liberal	Simon O'Brien	**Scott Morrison** (Lib)	Jon Doig	John McSweyn	Roger Bolling (CDP); Gaye Cameron (PHON); Peter Kelly (CNP)
Cowper	National	Andrew Woodward	Pat Conaghan (Nat)	Lauren Edwards	Lex Stewart	Allan Green (Ind); Ruth Meads (CDP); Rob Oakeshott (Ind); Kellie Pearce (AJP)
Cunningham	Labor	**Sharon Bird**	Chris Atlee (Lib)	Rowan Huxtable	Grace Younger	John Flanagan (NCP); John Gill (Sus)
Dobell	Labor	**Emma McBride**	Jilly Pilon (Lib)	Scott Rickard	Aaron Harpley-Carr	Paula Grundy (CDP); Gregory Stephenson (Ind)
Eden-Monaro	Labor	**Mike Kelly**	Fiona Kotvojs (Lib); Sophie Wade (Nat)	Pat McGinlay	Chandra Singh	Thomas Harris (CDP); James Holgate (Ind); David Sheldon (Ind)
Farrer	Liberal	Kieran Drabsch	**Sussan Ley** (Lib)	Dean Moss	Mike Rose	Mark Ellis (LDP); Ross Hamilton (SUS); Kevin Mack (Ind); Brian Mills (Ind); Philip Langfield (CDP)
Fowler	Labor	**Chris Hayes**	Wayne Blewitt (Lib)	Seamus Lee	Joshua Jabbour	Francesca Mocanu (CDP)
Gilmore	Liberal	Fiona Phillips	Katrina Hodgkinson (Nat); Warren Mundine (Lib)	Carmel McCallum	Milton Leslight	Serah Kolukulapally (CDP); Grant Schultz (Ind)
Grayndler	Labor	**Anthony Albanese**	Derek Henderson (Lib)	Jim Casey	Paris King-Orsborn	Gui Dong Cao (CDP); Majella Morello (Sci)
Greenway	Labor	**Michelle Rowland**	Allan Green (Lib)	Damien Atkins	Scott Feeney	Graham McFarland (ABF); Osbourn Rajadurai (CDP)
Hughes	Liberal	Diedree Steinwall	**Craig Kelly** (Lib)	Mitchell Shakespeare	Terry Keep	Matt Bryan (Ind); Gae Constable (AJP); Leo-Ning Liu (CDP)
Hume	Liberal	Aoife Champion	**Angus Taylor** (Lib)	David Powell	Lynda Abdo	Tanya Hargraves (CNP); Huw Kingston (Ind); Ian Nebauer (CDP)
Hunter	Labor	**Joel Fitzgibbon**	Josh Angus (Nat)	Janet Murray	Paul Davies	Max Boddy (SEP); Stuart Bonds (PHON); James Murphy (AJP); Richard Stretton (CDP)
Kingsford Smith	Labor	**Matt Thistlethwaite**	Amanda Wilmot (Lib)	James Cruz	Adam Watson	Petra Campbell (Sus); James Jansson (Sci); Adrian Manson (CDP)
Lindsay	Labor	Diane Beamer	Melissa McIntosh (Lib)	Nick Best	Christopher Buttel	Geoff Brown (Sus); Brandon Lees (CNP); Mark Moody-Basedow (CDP); Jim Saleam (AFP); Mark Tyndall (Ind)
Lyne	National	Phil Costa	**David Gillespie** (Nat)	Stuart Watson	Garry Bourke	Ed Caruana (AWP); Ryan Goldspring (CNP); Dean McCrae (LDP); Jeremy Miller (Ind); Catherine Zhao (CDP)
Macarthur	Labor	**Mike Freelander**	Riley Munro (Lib)	Jayden Rivera	Nathan Murphy	James Gent (CDP); Shane Norman (PHON); Matt Stellino (AJP)
Mackellar	Liberal	Declan Steele	**Jason Falinski** (Lib)	Pru Wawn	David Lyon	Suzanne Daly (Sus); Greg Levett (CDP); Alice Thompson (Ind)
Macquarie	Labor	**Susan Templeman**	Sarah Richards (Lib)	Kingsley Liu	Tony Pettitt	Greg Keightley (AJP)
McMahon	Labor	**Chris Bowen**	Vivek Singha (Lib)	Astrid O'Neill	Meg Wrightson	Damian Commane (PHON); Zeeshan Francis (CDP)
Mitchell	Liberal	Immanuel Selvaraj	**Alex Hawke** (Lib)	Lawrence Murphy	Roy Hoppenbrouwer	Craig Hall (CDP)
New England	National	Yvonne Langenberg	**Barnaby Joyce** (Nat)	Tony Lonergan	Cindy Duncan	Adam Blakester (Ind); Julie Collins (CDP); Natasha Ledger (Ind); Rob Taber (Ind)
Newcastle	Labor	**Sharon Claydon**	Katrina Wark (Lib)	John MacKenzie	Geoff Scully	Darren Brollo (AJP); Barry Futter (GAP); Pam Wise (CDP)
North Sydney	Liberal	Brett Stone	**Trent Zimmerman** (Lib)	Daniel Keogh	Peter Vagg	Arthur Chesterfield-Evans (Ind); Greg Graham (Sus); David Vernon (CDP)
Page	National	Patrick Deegan	**Kevin Hogan** (Nat)	Dan Reid	John Mudge	Fiona Leviny (Ind); Peter Walker (CDP); Alison Waters (AJP)
Parkes	National	Jack Ayoub	**Mark Coulton** (Nat)	David Paull (disendorsed)	Petrus Van Der Steen	Daniel Jones (LDP); Will Landers (Ind)
Parramatta	Labor	**Julie Owens**	Charles Camenzuli (Lib)	Phil Bradley	Gary Loke	Oscar Grenfell (SEP); Asma Payara (CDP)
Paterson	Labor	**Meryl Swanson**	Sachin Joshi (Lib)	Jan Davis	Graham Burston	Neil Turner (PHON); Christopher Vale (CDP)
Reid	Liberal	Sam Crosby	Fiona Martin (Lib)	Charles Jago	Young Lee	Rohan Laxmanalal (AJP); Keith Piper (CDP)
Richmond	Labor	**Justine Elliot**	Matthew Fraser (Nat)	Michael Lyon	Hamish Mitchell	Tom Barnett (IMO); Morgan Cox (CDP); Ray Karam (Ind); Ronald McDonald (Sus)
Riverina	National	Mark Jeffreson	**Michael McCormack** (Nat)	Michael Bayles	Richard Foley	
Robertson	Liberal	Anne Charlton	**Lucy Wicks** (Lib)	Cath Connor	Robert Marks	David Abrahams (Ind); Sean Bremner Young (AJP); Judy Singer (Sus); Fiona Stucken (CDP)
Shortland	Labor	**Pat Conroy**	Nell McGill (Lib)	Wylie Campbell	Dani Rifai	Bryan McGrath (AJP); Susan Newbury (Sus); Xing Yu (CDP)
Sydney	Labor	**Tanya Plibersek**	Jacqui Munro (Lib)	Matthew Thompson	Adam Holt	Aaron Hammond (Sci); Rebecca Reddin (CDP)
Warringah	Liberal	Dean Harris	**Tony Abbott** (Lib)	Kristyn Glanville	Suellen Wrightson	Heather Barnes (AJP); Jason Blaiklock (CDP); Brian Clare (CNP); Susan Moylan (Ind); Emanuele Paletto (Sus); Zali Steggall* (Ind)
Watson	Labor	**Tony Burke**	Mohammad Zaman (Lib)	Emmet de Bhaldraithe	Dean Wrightson	Karl Schubert (CDP); Raymond Zeng (Sci)
Wentworth	Independent	Tim Murray	Dave Sharma (Lib)	Dominic Wy Kanak	Mike Bloomfield	Matthew Drake-Brockman (Ind); **Kerryn Phelps** (Ind); Paul Treacy (CDP)
Werriwa	Labor	**Anne Stanley**	Shayne Miller (Lib)	Signe Westerberg	Ignatius Tsiriplis	Narelle Storey (CDP); Michael White (Ind)
Whitlam	Labor	**Stephen Jones**	Stephen Wentworth (Nat)	Jamie Dixon	Angelo Cuda	Ken Davis (Sus); Frank Nero (CDP)

=== Northern Territory ===
Electorate	Held by	Labor candidate	CLP candidate	Greens candidate	UAP candidate	Other candidates
Lingiari	Labor	**Warren Snowdon**	Jacinta Price	George Hanna	Daniel Hodgson	Hamish MacFarlane (Ind); Regina McCarthy (RUAP)
Solomon	Labor	**Luke Gosling**	Kathy Ganley	Timothy Parish	Raj Samson	Sue Fraser-Adams (Ind); Lorraine Gimini (RUAP)

=== Queensland ===
Electorate	Held by	Labor candidate	LNP candidate	Greens candidate	One Nation candidate	UAP candidate	Other candidates
Blair	Labor	**Shayne Neumann**	Robert Shearman	Michelle Duncan	Sharon Bell	Majella Zimpel	Peter Fitzpatrick (CNP); Simone Karandrews (Ind); John Quinn (DLP); John Turner (Ind)
Bonner	LNP	Jo Briskey	**Ross Vasta**	Barbara Bell	Ian Symes	Simon Flitcroft	Alex Maynard (CNP)
Bowman	LNP	Tom Baster	**Andrew Laming**	Emerald Moon	Glen Wadsworth	Shane Clarke	David Anderson (CNP)
Brisbane	LNP	Paul Newbury	**Trevor Evans**	Andrew Bartlett	Anne Perry	Aaron Whittaker	Kamala Emanuel (SA); Rod Jeanneret (CNP)
Capricornia	LNP	Russell Robertson	**Michelle Landry**	Paul Bambrick	Wade Rothery	Lindsay Sturgeon	George Birkbeck (KAP); Ken Murray (Ind); Grant Pratt (CNP); Richard Temple (DLP)
Dawson	LNP	Belinda Hassan	**George Christensen**	Imogen Lindenberg	Deb Lawson	Colin Thompson	Brendan Bunyan (KAP); Lachlan Queenan (Ind); Michael Turner (CNP); Ann-Maree Ware (DLP)
Dickson	LNP	Ali France	**Peter Dutton**	Benedict Coyne	Carrol Halliwell	Stephen Austin	Maureen Brohman (AJP); Thor Prohaska (Ind); Richelle Simpson (CNP)
Fadden	LNP	Luz Stanton	**Stuart Robert**	Scott Turner	Darren Eather	Mara Krischker	Allan Barber (CNP); Jake Welch (LDP)
Fairfax	LNP	Julie McGlone	**Ted O'Brien**	Sue Etheridge	Paul Henselin	Kylie Cowling	Sinim Australie (Ind); Richard Belcher (Sus); Bertrand Cadart (LDP); Jake Ryan (CNP)
Fisher	LNP	Daniel Parsell	**Andrew Wallace**	Tracy Burton	Chris Paterson	Trevor Gray	Mike Jessop (CNP); Paul Monaghan (LAOL)
Flynn	LNP	Zac Beers	**Ken O'Dowd**	Jaiben Baker	Sharon Lohs	Nathan Harris	Marcus Hiesler (CNP); Murray Peterson (Ind); Duncan Scott (Ind)
Forde	LNP	Des Hardman	**Bert van Manen**	Kirsty Petersen	Ian Bowron	Paul Creighton	Les Innes (CNP)
Griffith	Labor	**Terri Butler**	Olivia Roberts	Max Chandler-Mather	Julie Darlington	Christian Julius	Tony Murray (CNP)
Groom	LNP	Troy Kay	**John McVeigh**	Alyce Nelligan	David Kin	Kenneth Law	Perry Adrelius (CNP)
Herbert	Labor	**Cathy O'Toole**	Phillip Thompson	Sam Blackadder	Amy Lohse	Greg Dowling	Tamara Durant (CNP); Nanette Radeck (KAP); Mackenzie Severns (AJP)
Hinkler	LNP	Richard Pascoe	**Keith Pitt**	Anne Jackson	Damian Huxham	Joseph Ellul	Amy Byrnes (AJP); Aaron Erskine (CNP); David Norman (Ind); Moe Turaga (Ind); Adrian Wone (Ind)
Kennedy	KAP	Brett McGuire	Frank Beveridge	Lyle Burness		Sue Bertuch	Ian Hackwell (CNP); **Bob Katter*** (KAP)
Leichhardt	LNP	Elida Faith	**Warren Entsch**	Gary Oliver	Ross Macdonald	Jen Sackley	Chad Anderson (Ind); Jo Ashby (CNP); Daniel McCarthy (KAP)
Lilley	Labor	Anika Wells	Brad Carswell	John Meyer	Tracey Bell-Henselin	David McClaer	Don Coles (CNP); Mike Crook (SA)
Longman	Labor	**Susan Lamb**	Terry Young	Simone Dejun	Matthew Thomson	Bailey Maher	Dave Paulke (CNP); Peter Schuback (AFP); Jono Young (AP)
Maranoa	LNP	Linda Little	**David Littleproud**	Emmeline Chidley	Rosemary Moulden	Julie Saunders	Darren Christiansen (CNP); Anthony Wallis (KAP)
McPherson	LNP	Aaron Santelises	**Karen Andrews**	Alan Quinn	John Spellman	Fiona MacKenzie	Scott Crowe (LDP); Sean Gaffy (CNP); Michael Kaff (Ind); Renee Stewart (AJP)
Moncrieff	LNP	Tracey Bell	Angie Bell	Sally Spain	Vanessa Sibson	Garry Eilola	Karla Freeman (AJP); Sly Gryphon (LDP); Darren Long (CNP)
Moreton	Labor	**Graham Perrett**	Angela Owen	Patsy O'Brien	William Lawrence	Jenny-Rebecca Brown	Aaron Nieass (CNP)
Oxley	Labor	**Milton Dick**	Russell Bauer	Steven Purcell	Janet Lindbom	Ian Ferguson	Mike Head (SEP); Scott Moerland (CNP)
Petrie	LNP	Corinne Mulholland	**Luke Howarth**	Jason Kennedy	Nikhil Aai Reddy	Troy Hopkins	Neville Fowler (CNP)
Rankin	Labor	**Jim Chalmers**	Clinton Pattison	Neil Cotter	Jesse Schneider	Shyamal Reddy	Peter Andrews (CNP); Ric Davies (LDP); Yusuf Mohammad (-)
Ryan	LNP	Peter Cossar	Julian Simmonds	Jake Schoermer	Rodney Miles	Larry Crouch	Andrew Banks (CNP); Joanne Webb (AJP)
Wide Bay	LNP	Jason Scanes	**Llew O'Brien**	Daniel Bryar	Aaron Vico	Andrew Schebella	Tim Jerome (Ind); Jasmine Smith (CNP)
Wright	LNP	Pam McCreadie	**Scott Buchholz**	Shannon Girard	Chris O'Callaghan	David Wright	Innes Larkin (Ind); Rod Smith (CNP); Matthew Tomlinson (KAP)

=== South Australia ===
Electorate	Held by	Labor candidate	Liberal candidate	Greens candidate	UAP candidate	AJP candidate	Other candidates
Adelaide	Labor	**Steve Georganas**	Shaun Osborn	Barbara Pocock	Antonio Rea	Deanna Kangas	Chris James (Dem)
Barker	Liberal	Mat O'Brien	**Tony Pasin**	Rosa Hillam	Bert Bacher	Karen Eckermann	Kelly Gladigau (CA); Miles Hannemann (Nat)
Boothby	Liberal	Nadia Clancy	**Nicolle Flint**	Stef Rozitis	Peter Salerno	Geoff Russell	Adrian Cheok (CNP); Trevor Jones (Ind); Carol Wong (RUAP)
Grey	Liberal	Karin Bolton	**Rowan Ramsey**	Candace Champion	Alexander Warren	Jacqui Edgecombe	Richard Carmody (Ind); Andrea Broadfoot (CA); David Stone (PHON)
Hindmarsh	Labor	**Mark Butler**	Jake Hall-Evans	Matt Farrell	Rose Morris	Alison Kelty	Rajan Vaid (CNP)
Kingston	Labor	**Amanda Rishworth**	Laura Curran	Nikki Mortier	Jodie Hoskin	Kellie Somers	
Makin	Labor	**Tony Zappia**	Hemant Dave	Stephanie Stewart	Rachel Collis	Lyn Gaston	
Mayo	Centre Alliance	Saskia Gerhardy	Georgina Downer	Anne Bourne	Michael Cane	Helen Dowland	**Rebekha Sharkie** (CA)
Spence	Labor	**Nick Champion**	Kathleen Bourne	Daniel Jury	Ron Fiedler	Rita Kuhlmann	Nathan Herbert (Ind)
Sturt	Liberal	Cressida O'Hanlon	James Stevens	Paul Boundy	Hedley Harding	Harbinda Roberts	Angela Fulco (AP); Nick Larcombe (Ind); Colin Thomas (CPP)

=== Tasmania ===
Electorate	Held by	Labor candidate	Liberal candidate	Greens candidate	UAP candidate	Other candidates
Bass	Labor	**Ross Hart**	Bridget Archer	Tom Hall	Allan Roark	Carl Cooper (Nat); Todd Lambert (Ind); Susan Woodbury (AJP)
Braddon	Labor	**Justine Keay**	Gavin Pearce	Phill Parsons	Karen Spaulding	Shane Allan (CNP); Craig Brakey (Ind); Graham Gallaher (PHON); Sally Milbourne (Nat); Brett Smith (Ind)
Clark	Independent	Ben McGregor	Amanda-Sue Markham	Juniper Shaw	Jim Starkey	**Andrew Wilkie** (Ind)
Franklin	Labor	**Julie Collins**	Dean Young	Kit Darko	Darren Winter	Darren Hawes (CNP)
Lyons	Labor	**Brian Mitchell**	Jessica Whelan (disendorsed)	Gary Whisson	Mick Warne	Deanna Hutchinson (Nat); Tennille Murtagh (PHON)

=== Victoria ===
Electorate	Held by	Labor candidate	Coalition candidate	Greens candidate	UAP candidate	Other candidates
Aston	Liberal	Kadira Pethiyagoda	**Alan Tudge** (Lib)	Asher Cookson	Matthew Sirianni-Duffy	Anna Kennedy (DLP)
Ballarat	Labor	**Catherine King**	Tim Vo (Lib)	Karen McAloon	Peter Cozyn	Alex Graham (Ind); Bryn Hills (AJP); Nick Shady (Ind)
Bendigo	Labor	**Lisa Chesters**	Sam Gayed (Lib)	Robert Holian	Adam Veitch	Sharon Budde (RUAP); Julie Hoskin (CNP); Vaughan Williams (PHON)
Bruce	Labor	**Julian Hill**	John MacIsaac (Lib)	Rhonda Garad	Mubahil Ahmed	Tim Boyanton (CNP)
Calwell	Labor	**Maria Vamvakinou**	Genevieve Hamilton (Lib)	Polly Morgan	Prakul Chhabra	Peter Byrne (SEP); Keith Kerr (CEC); Jerome Small (VS); Adam Vail (CNP)
Casey	Liberal	Bill Brindle	**Tony Smith** (Lib)	Jenny Game-Lopata	Wendy Starkey	Travis Barker (AJP); Antony Calabro (RUAP); Peter Charleton (Ind); Ryan Clark (DHJP); Ross McPhee (DLP); Jayden O'Connor (GAP)
Chisholm	Liberal	Jennifer Yang	Gladys Liu (Lib)	Luke Arthur	George Zoraya	Ian Dobby (Ind); Angela Dorian (RUAP); Philip Jenkins (DLP); Rosemary Lavin (AJP); Anne Wicks (DHJP)
Cooper	Labor	**Ged Kearney**	Andrew Bell (Lib)	David Risstrom	Brett Nangle	Kath Larkin (VS); Nadine Richings (AJP); Sarah Russell (RP); Teresa van Lieshout (Ind)
Corangamite	Labor (notional)	Libby Coker	**Sarah Henderson** (Lib)	Simon Northeast	Neil Harvey	Naomi Adams (AJP); Damien Cole (Ind); Ian Erskine (RUAP); Mandy Grimley (DHJP)
Corio	Labor	**Richard Marles**	Alastair Thomson (Lib)	Amber Forbes	Desmond Sanborn	
Deakin	Liberal	Shireen Morris	**Michael Sukkar** (Lib)	Sophia Sun	Milton Wilde	Vinita Costantino (AJP); Vickie Janson (Ind); Ellie Jean Sullivan (DHJP); Joel van der Horst (DLP)
Dunkley	Labor (notional)	Peta Murphy	**Chris Crewther** (Lib)	Emily Green	Ron Jean	Yvonne Gentle (RUAP); Christopher James (CNP); Elizabeth Johnston (AJP); Lachlan O'Connell (DHJP)
Flinders	Liberal	Josh Sinclair	**Greg Hunt** (Lib)	Nathan Lesslie	Christine McShane	**Julia Banks** (Ind); Susie Beveridge (Ind); Harry Dreger (Ind); James Persson (AJP); Reade Smith (Sus)
Fraser	Labor (notional)	Daniel Mulino	Peter Bain (Lib)	Rebecca Scorgie	Vinh Chau	Tony Dobran (GAP); Van Tran (Ind)
Gellibrand	Labor	**Tim Watts**	Anthony Mitchell (Lib)	Bernadette Thomas	Lisa Bentley	
Gippsland	National	Antoinette Holm	**Darren Chester** (Nat)	Deb Foskey	Kerri Brewer	Sonia Buckley (Ind); David Snelling (SFF); Neville Tickner (CNP)
Goldstein	Liberal	Daniel Pollock	**Tim Wilson** (Lib)	Sue Pennicuik	Wayne Connolly	John Casley (Ind); Brandon Hoult (Sus)
Gorton	Labor	**Brendan O'Connor**	Nathan Di Noia (Lib)	Harkirat Singh	Richard Turton	Jarrod Bingham (Ind)
Higgins	Liberal	Fiona McLeod	Katie Allen (Lib)	Jason Ball	Tim Ryan	Michaela Moran (Sus); Alicia Walker (AJP)
Holt	Labor	**Anthony Byrne**	Jennifer van den Broek (Lib)	Jess Wheelock	Jatinder Singh	
Hotham	Labor	**Clare O'Neil**	George Hua (Lib)	Jess Gonsalvez	Jin Luan	Dennis Bilic (Sus); Peter Dorian (RUAP)
Indi	Independent	Eric Kerr	Mark Byatt (Nat); Steve Martin (Lib)	Helen Robinson	Shane Wheatland	Helen Haines* (Ind); Jason Whalley (DHJP)
Isaacs	Labor	**Mark Dreyfus**	Jeremy Hearn (Lib) (disendorsed)	Kim Samiotis	Anthony Seals	Bronwyn Currie (AJP); Ash Puvimanasinghe (RUAP)
Jagajaga	Labor	Kate Thwaites	Richard Welch (Lib)	Paul Kennedy	Maria Rigoni	Jeff Truscott (RUAP)
Kooyong	Liberal	Jana Stewart	**Josh Frydenberg** (Lib)	Julian Burnside	Steven D'Elia	Bill Chandler (Ind); Davina Hinkley (AJP); Oliver Yates (Ind); Angelina Zubac (Ind)
La Trobe	Liberal	Simon Curtis	**Jason Wood** (Lib)	Amy Gregorovich	Duncan Dean	Esther Baker (PHON); Norman Baker (RUAP); Asher Calwell-Browne (DHJP)
Lalor	Labor	**Joanne Ryan**	Gayle Murphy (Lib)	Jay Dessi (disendorsed)	Jeffrey Robinson	Susan Jakobi (AFP); Aijaz Moinuddin (-)
Macnamara	Labor	Josh Burns	Kate Ashmor (Lib)	Steph Hodgins-May	Helen Paton	Steven Armstrong (SUS); Christine Kay (RUAP); Craig McPherson (AJP); Ruby O'Rourke (Ind); Chris Wallis (Ind)
Mallee	National	Carole Hart	Serge Petrovich (Lib); Anne Webster* (Nat)	Nicole Rowan	Rick Millar	Leigh Firman (Sci); Rick Grosvenor (CNP); Ray Kingston (Ind); Chris Lahy (CEC); Cecila Moar (Ind); Jason Modica (Ind); Philip Mollison (RUAP); Dan Straub (SFF)
Maribyrnong	Labor	**Bill Shorten**	Christine Stow (Lib)	James Williams	Sarwar Hasan	
McEwen	Labor	**Rob Mitchell**	Phillip Fusco (Lib)	Neil Barker	Chris Hayman	Deb Butler (DHJP); Ronnie Graham (PHON); Robert Hyndman (Ind); Ruth Parramore (AJP)
Melbourne	Greens	Luke Creasey (disendorsed)	Lauren Sherson (Lib)	**Adam Bandt**	Tony Pecora (disendorsed)	David Blake (Ind); Lawrence Pope (AJP); Judy Ryan (RP)
Menzies	Liberal	Stella Yee	**Kevin Andrews** (Lib)	Robert Humphreys	Brett Fuller	Teresa Kelleher (DLP); Rachel Payne (RP)
Monash	Liberal	Jessica O'Donnell	**Russell Broadbent** (Lib)	William Hornstra	Matthew Sherry	Michael Fozard (Ind); John Verhoeven (Ind); Jeff Waddell (PHON)
Nicholls	National	Bill Lodwick	**Damian Drum** (Nat)	Nickee Freedman	Stewart Hine	Andrew Bock (Ind); Nigel Hicks (Ind); Jeremy Parker (Ind); Rikkie-Lee Tyrrell (PHON)
Scullin	Labor	**Andrew Giles**	Gurpal Singh (Lib) (disendorsed)	Cynthia Smith	Firas Hasan	Yassin Albarri (Ind); Rod Whitfield (AJP)
Wannon	Liberal	Maurice Billi	**Dan Tehan** (Lib)	Zephlyn Taylor	Joshua Wallace	Alex Dyson (Ind)
Wills	Labor	**Peter Khalil**	Peter Killin (Lib) (disendorsed)	Adam Pulford	Manju Venkat	Sue Bolton (VS); Chris Miles (AJP)

=== Western Australia ===
Electorate	Held by	Labor candidate	Liberal candidate	Greens candidate	UAP candidate	PHON candidate	Other candidate
Brand	Labor	**Madeleine King**	Jack Pleiter	Jody Freeman	Trevor Jones	Travis Carter	Karen-Lee Mills (CNP); Blake Phelan (WAP); Janine Vander Ven (AC)
Burt	Labor	**Matt Keogh**	David Goode	Simone Collins	Sahil Chawla	Nicole Devincentis	Warnar Spyker (AC); Naomi Nation (Ind); Peter Raffaelli (SFF); Sarcha Sagisaka (WAP)
Canning	Liberal	Mellisa Teede	**Andrew Hastie**	Jodie Moffat	Steve Veevers	Jackson Wreford	Brett Clarke (WAP); Malcolm Heffernan (CNP); Jamie van Burgel (AC)
Cowan	Labor	**Anne Aly**	Isaac Stewart	Mark Cooper	Peter Westcott	Sheila Mundy	Paul Bedford (SFF); Andre Lebrasse (AC)
Curtin	Liberal	Rob Meecham	Celia Hammond	Cameron Pidgeon	Joan Lever	Bill Edgar	Deonne Kingsford (AC); Andrew Mangano (WAP); Louise Stewart (Ind)
Durack	Liberal	Sharyn Morrow	**Melissa Price**	Johani Mamid	Brenden Hatton	Grahame Gould	Scott Bourne (Nat); Gary Mounsey (WAP)
Forrest	Liberal	Wayne Sanford	**Nola Marino**	Nerilee Boshammer	Dale Bromley	Kalven Jamieson	Alexander Marsden (Ind); Mark McCall (SFF); Ian Molyneux (WAP)
Fremantle	Labor	**Josh Wilson**	Nicole Robins	Jesse Hutchinson	Fatima Lever	Brett Weary	Janetia Knapp (WAP); Laetisia Mulder (AC); Sam Wainwright (SA)
Hasluck	Liberal	James Martin	**Ken Wyatt**	Lee-Anne Miles	Mike Dale	Tim Orr	Stephen Phelan (WAP); Fiona White-Hartig (SFF); Brady Williams (AC)
Moore	Liberal	Tony O'Gorman	**Ian Goodenough**	Daniel Vujcich	Rod Chilcott	Tyler Walsh	Rex Host (AC); Jen Jacobs (WAP); Ziggi Murphy (Ind)
O'Connor	Liberal	Shelley Payne	**Rick Wilson**	Nelson Gilmour	Anthony Fels	Dean Smith	John Hassell (Nat); Nicholas Robinson (GAP); Peter Swift (WAP); Ian 't Hart (AC)
Pearce	Liberal	Kim Travers	**Christian Porter**	Eugene Marshall	Rob Forster	Sandy Old	Steve Blythe (Nat); Colin Butland (Ind); Michael Calautti (WAP); Magdeleen Strauss (AC); Ross Williamson (SFF)
Perth	Labor	**Patrick Gorman**	Jim Grayden	Caroline Perks	Chas Hopkins	Mel Lownds	Jane Boxall (WAP); Gary Davies (Sci); Curtis Greening (FLUX)
Stirling	Liberal	Melita Markey	Vince Connelly	Judith Cullity	Dorothy Hutton	Angus Young	Kevin Host (AC); Elizabeth Re (WAP)
Swan	Liberal	Hannah Beazley	**Steve Irons**	Liberty Cramer	Peter McLernon	Tshung-Hui Chang	Carmel Addink (CNP); Michael Chehoff (AFP); Sharron Hawkins Zeeb (WAP); Steve Klomp (AC); Virginia Thomas-Wurth (AJP)
Tangney	Liberal	Marion Boswell	**Ben Morton**	Martin Spencer	Chris Fernandez	Scott Rafferty	Jillian Horton (Ind); Mark Staer (AC); Paul Waddy (Ind); Gavin Waugh (WAP)

== Senate ==
=== Australian Capital Territory ===
There were 17 Senate candidates for the ACT.

Two seats were up for election. The Labor Party was defending one seat. The Liberal Party was defending one seat.

Labor candidates	Liberal candidates	Greens candidates	UAP candidates	Sustainable candidates
1. Katy Gallagher*; 2. Nancy Waites	1. Zed Seselja*; 2. Robert Gunning	1. Penny Kyburz; 2. Emma Davidson	1. Peter Walter; 2. Rebecah Hodgson	1. John Haydon; 2. Joy Angel
CNP candidates	Group C candidates	Ungrouped candidates		
1. Shane van Duren; 2. Scott Birkett	1. Anthony Pesec; 2. Gary Kent	Nick Houston; Gary Cowton; David Kim (CDP)		

=== New South Wales ===
There were 105 candidates for the Senate in New South Wales.

Six seats were up for election. The Labor Party was defending one seat. The Liberal-National Coalition was defending two seats. The Greens were defending one seat. One Nation was defending one seat, although sitting senator Brian Burston had defected to the United Australia Party. The Liberal Democrats was defending one seat. Senators Concetta Fierravanti-Wells (Liberal), Kristina Keneally (Labor), Jenny McAllister (Labor), Deborah O'Neill (Labor), Marise Payne (Liberal) and Arthur Sinodinos (Liberal) were not up for re-election.

Labor candidates	Coalition candidates	Greens candidates	LDP candidates	One Nation candidates
1. Tony Sheldon*; 2. Tim Ayres*; 3. Jason Yat-Sen Li; 4. Simonne Pengelly; 5. Aruna Chandrala; 6. Charlie Sheahan	1. Hollie Hughes* (Lib); 2. Andrew Bragg* (Lib); 3. Perin Davey* (Nat); 4. Jim Molan (Lib); 5. Sam Farraway (Nat); 6. Michael Feneley (Lib)	1. Mehreen Faruqi*; 2. Rachael Jacobs; 3. Louise Steer; 4. Philippa Clark; 5. Roz Chia; 6. Sylvie Ellsmore	1. Duncan Spender; 2. Codie Neville	1. Kate McCulloch; 2. Barry Reed
UAP candidates	RUAP candidates	HEMP candidates	Health candidates	Pirate candidates
1. Brian Burston; 2. Christine Bernier; 3. Wayne Moore	1. Maree Nichols; 2. Vladimir Shigrov; 3. Leo Toop	1. Andrew Katelaris; 2. Michael Balderstone	1. Molly Knight; 2. Jason Fairbairn	1. John August; 2. Sara Joyce
AAHP candidates	SFF candidates	People's candidates	Socialist Alliance candidates	Together candidates
1. Andrew Potts; 2. Anthony Ziebell	1. Brett Cooke; 2. Wayne Borsak	1. Steven Georgantis; 2. Susan Tsangaris	1. Susan Price; 2. Joel McAlear	1. Mark Swivel; 2. Belinda Kinkead; 3. Kate McDowell
Conservatives candidates	Great Australian candidates	CNP candidates	CDP candidates	ICAN candidates
1. Sophie York; 2. Riccardo Bosi	1. Matthew Hopkins; 2. Karen Burge	1. Carolyn Thomson; 2. Gary Young; 3. Paul Swann; 4. Ian Wharton	1. Silvana Nile; 2. Annie Wright	1. Rod Bower; 2. Jim Tait; 3. Annette Schnider
Women's candidates	Seniors United candidates	SEP candidates	Workers candidates	ABF candidates
1. Divvi De Vendre; 2. Penelope Lloyd	1. Paul Gerantonis; 2. Helen Ducker	1. Richard Phillips; 2. John Davis	1. Mark Ptolemy; 2. Maria Nguyen	1. Jewell Drury; 2. Peter Moujalli
IMO candidates	DLP candidates	Action candidates	AJP candidates	Flux candidates
1. Michael O'Neill; 2. Marelle Burnum Burnum	1. Daniel Hanna; 2. Benedict O'Brien	1. Nick Debenham; 2. Guy Forsyth	1. Angela Pollard; 2. Michael Dello-Iacovo; 3. Carol Bellenger	1. Ben Rushton; 2. Joanne Cotterill
Science candidates	CEC candidates	Sustainable candidates	Democrats candidates	Small Business candidates
1. Andrea Leong; 2. Eve Slavich; 3. Peter Furness; 4. Greg Parker	1. Ann Lawler; 2. Robert Butler	1. William Bourke; 2. Warren Grzic	1. Peter Mailler; 2. Chris Buckman	1. Angela Vithoulkas; 2. Fiona Douskou
Ungrouped candidates
John Carmichael; Chifley Haddad; Phil Baker; Graeme Doyle; John John Romanous; Hussein Faraj; Russell Barber (LAL); Sandra Lazarus; Glenn Wagner; David O'Brien; Wayne Bell; Michael Kirkwood; Pamela Johnstone; Carolyn Crossman

=== Northern Territory ===
There were 18 Senate candidates for the NT.

Two seats were up for election. The Labor Party was defending one seat. The Country Liberal Party was defending one seat.

Labor candidates	CLP candidates	Greens candidates	UAP candidates	RUAP candidates
1. Malarndirri McCarthy*; 2. Wayne Kurnorth (disendorsed)	1. Sam McMahon*; 2. Joshua Burgoyne	1. Anna Sri; 2. Lia Gill	1. Michael Wolf; 2. Ross McRobert	1. Jan Pile; 2. Leslie Harris
HEMP candidates	CEC candidates	CNP candidates	Group D candidates	
1. Andrew Kavasilas; 2. Lance Lawrence	1. Trudy Campbell; 2. Peter Flynn	1. Mark Dickson; 2. James Wheeler	1. Braedon Early; 2. Crystal Johnson	

=== Queensland ===
There were 83 candidates for the Senate in Queensland.

Six seats were up for election. The Labor Party was defending two seats. The Liberal National Party was defending two seats. The Greens were defending one seat. One Nation was defending one seat, although sitting senator Fraser Anning had defected to his own Conservative National Party. Senators Matt Canavan (Liberal National), Anthony Chisholm (Labor), Pauline Hanson (One Nation), James McGrath (Liberal National), Amanda Stoker (Liberal National) and Murray Watt (Labor) were not up for re-election.

Labor candidates	LNP candidates	Greens candidates	One Nation candidates	CNP candidates
1. Nita Green*; 2. Chris Ketter; 3. Frank Gilbert; 4. Tania Major; 5. Stacey Schinnerl; 6. Christina Warry	1. Paul Scarr*; 2. Susan McDonald*; 3. Gerard Rennick*; 4. Ian Macdonald; 5. Amanda Camm; 6. Nicole Tobin	1. Larissa Waters*; 2. Navdeep Singh Sidhu; 3. Johanna Kloot; 4. Raelene Ellis; 5. Miranda Bertram; 6. Kirsten Kennedy	1. Malcolm Roberts*; 2. Steve Dickson (disendorsed)	1. Fraser Anning; 2. Paul Taylor; 3. Mark Absolon; 4. Nancy Sandford; 5. Brad Cameron
UAP candidates	KAP candidates	LDP candidates	RUAP candidates	SFF candidates
1. Clive Palmer; 2. Martin Brewster; 3. Yodie Batzke	1. Joy Marriott; 2. Gregory Wallace; 3. Alan Webb	1. Gabe Buckley; 2. Lloyd Russell	1. Graham Healy; 2. Lionel Henaway	1. Jeff Hodges; 2. Andrew Pope
Conservatives candidates	LAOL candidates	ICAN candidates	Sustainable candidates	Pirate candidates
1. Lyle Shelton; 2. Joanna Lindgren; 3. Kate Horan	1. Kim Vuga; 2. Gavin Wyatt	1. Andy Lewis; 2. Cornel Lokkers; 3. Gary Pead	1. Cameron Murray; 2. Chris Simpson	1. Brandon Selic; 2. Miles Whiticker
IMO candidates	AJP candidates	ABF candidates	Action candidates	CEC candidates
1. Allona Lahn; 2. Adam Rowe	1. Karagh-Mae Kelly; 2. Leah Coutts; 3. Belinda Hardy	1. Darren Caulfield; 2. Adam Finch; 3. Rod Fox	1. Kris Bullen; 2. Robyn Stevenson	1. Jan Pukallus; 2. Danny Hope
Great Australian candidates	Workers candidates	HEMP candidates	DLP candidates	Group R candidates
1. Arjay Martin; 2. Tania Moohin	1. Gregory Bradley; 2. Kathleen Wellstead	1. John Jiggens; 2. Frank Jordan	1. Lindsay Temple; 2. Sheila Vincent	1. Hetty Johnston; 2. Sue Mureau
Group X candidates	Ungrouped candidates			
1. Tony R. Moore; 2. Cartia Moore	Debby Lo-Dean; Gary Sharpe; Paul Larcombe; Jane Hasler; John Woodward; Nicholas McArthur-Williams; Hassan Ghulam; Wayne Wharton; Amanda Murphy; Paul Stevenson (MHP)			

=== South Australia ===
There were 42 Senate candidates for the Senate in South Australia.

Six seats were up for election. The Labor Party was defending one seat. The Liberal Party was defending two seats. The Greens were defending one seat. The Centre Alliance, formerly the Nick Xenophon Team, was defending one seat, although sitting senator Tim Storer, who retired, had sat as an independent. One seat had been held by the Family First Party, which was absorbed by the Australian Conservatives; however, sitting senator Lucy Gichuhi defected to the Liberal Party. Senators Cory Bernardi (Conservatives, elected as Liberal), Simon Birmingham (Liberal), Don Farrell (Labor), Stirling Griff (Centre), Rex Patrick (Centre) and Penny Wong (Labor) were not up for re-election.

Labor candidates	Liberal candidates	Greens candidates	Centre candidates	Conservatives candidates
1. Alex Gallacher*; 2. Marielle Smith*; 3. Emily Gore; 4. Larissa Harrison	1. Anne Ruston*; 2. David Fawcett*; 3. Alex Antic*; 4. Lucy Gichuhi	1. Sarah Hanson-Young*; 2. Major Sumner; 3. Gwydion Rozitisolds; 4. Robyn Seto	1. Skye Kakoschke-Moore; 2. Craig Bossie	1. Rikki Lambert; 2. Carl Teusner
HEMP candidates	One Nation candidates	UAP candidates	AJP candidates	SFF candidates
1. Angela Adams; 2. Matthew Iverson	1. Jennifer Game; 2. Emma Illies	1. Kristian Rees; 2. Kerry Kovacs; 3. Sharon Hoskin	1. Louise Pfeiffer; 2. Wendy Davey	1. John Hahn; 2. Wayne Kirk
CNP candidates	Democrats candidates	Great Australian candidates	CEC candidates	Sustainable candidates
1. Peter Manuel; 2. Tim Dwyer	1. Tim Burrow; 2. Andrew Castrique	1. Mark Aldridge; 2. Gary Matthews	1. Sean Allwood; 2. Paul Siebert	1. Graham Davies; 2. Robyn Coleman
LDP candidates	Ungrouped candidates			
1. Kimbra Ransley; 2. Stephen Humble	Michael Lesiw; Brett O'Donnell; Henry Cox			

=== Tasmania ===
There were 44 Senate candidates for Tasmania.

Six seats were up for election. The Labor Party was defending three seats. The Liberal Party was defending one seat. The Greens were defending one seat. The Jacqui Lambie Network was defending one seat, although sitting senator Steve Martin had defected to the National Party. Senators Eric Abetz (Liberal), Wendy Askew (Liberal), Jonathon Duniam (Liberal), Helen Polley (Labor), Anne Urquhart (Labor) and Peter Whish-Wilson (Greens) were not up for re-election.

Labor candidates	Liberal candidates	Greens candidates	Lambie candidates	Nationals candidates
1. Carol Brown*; 2. Catryna Bilyk*; 3. John Short; 4. Lisa Singh; 5. Wayne Roberts; 6. Robert Flanagan	1. Richard Colbeck*; 2. Claire Chandler*; 3. Tanya Denison	1. Nick McKim*; 2. Helen Hutchinson; 3. Simone Marsh	1. Jacqui Lambie*; 2. Glynn Williams; 3. Chris Reynolds	1. Steve Martin; 2. Wendy Hilditch
One Nation candidates	Conservatives candidates	LDP candidates	UAP candidates	AJP candidates
1. Matthew Stephen; 2. Adam Lambert	1. Justin Stringer; 2. Nigel Frame	1. Clinton Mead; 2. Matthew Rabey	1. Kevin Morgan; 2. David Williams; 3. Craig Gunnis	1. Karen Bevis; 2. Isobel Turner
Sustainable candidates	CEC candidates	CNP candidates	HEMP candidates	SFF candidates
1. Todd Dudley; 2. Christopher Maclay	1. Ray Williams; 2. Steve Kucina	1. Michael Jones; 2. Frank Falzon	1. Alfred Informal; 2. Matt Owen	1. Rebecca Byfield; 2. Kim Swanson
Group O candidates	Ungrouped candidates			
1. Craig Garland; 2. Mark Duncan	Greg Beck (ABF); Steve Mav; Francis Flannery; Karen Street (LAL)			

=== Victoria ===
There were 82 candidates for the Senate in Victoria.

Six seats were up for election. The Labor Party was defending two seats. The Liberal-National Coalition was defending two seats. The Greens were defending one seat. Derryn Hinch's Justice Party was defending one seat. Senators Kim Carr (Labor), Richard Di Natale (Greens), Mitch Fifield (Liberal), Kimberley Kitching (Labor), Bridget McKenzie (National) and Scott Ryan (Liberal) were not up for re-election.

Labor candidates	Coalition candidates	Greens candidates	Justice candidates	UAP candidates
1. Raff Ciccone*; 2. Jess Walsh*; 3. Gavin Marshall; 4. Parvinder Sarwara; 5. Karen Douglas; 6. Louise Crawford	1. James Paterson* (Lib); 2. Jane Hume* (Lib); 3. David Van* (Lib); 4. Anita Rank (Nat); 5. Kyle Hoppitt (Lib); 6. Julian Mulcahy (Lib)	1. Janet Rice*; 2. Apsara Sabaratnam; 3. Claire Proctor; 4. Nakita Thomson; 5. Alice Barnes; 6. Judy Cameron	1. Derryn Hinch; 2. Simone O'Brien	1. Catriona Thoolen; 2. Katie O'Connor; 3. Roger McKay
One Nation candidates	Conservatives candidates	CDP candidates	Rise Up Australia candidates	Flux candidates
1. James Hallam; 2. Ian Cameron	1. Kevin Bailey; 2. Nina van Strijp; 3. Trent Thomas	1. Bob Payne; 2. Kevin Murphy	1. Rosalie Crestani; 2. Danny Nalliah	1. Dustin Perry; 2. Seb Carrie-Wilson
ICAN candidates	Sustainable candidates	AJP candidates	Democrats candidates	Great Australian candidates
1. Paul Wittwer; 2. Kammy Cordner Hunt	1. Allan Doensen; 2. Madeleine Wearne	1. Ben Schultz; 2. Fiona McRostie	1. David Collyer; 2. Marc Williams	1. Darryl O'Bryan; 2. Helen Edwards
SEP candidates	Pirate candidates	SFF candidates	Republican candidates	Small Business candidates
1. Tessa Pietsch; 2. Jason Wardle	1. Tania Briese; 2. Shannon Smith	1. Ricky Muir; 2. Damian Stock	1. Geoff Lutz; 2. Peter Consandine	1. Simon Kemp; 2. Peter Graham
Action candidates	HEMP candidates	CEC candidates	LDP candidates	Secular candidates
1. Philip Ayton; 2. Monika Kompara	1. Frances Hood; 2. Heather Gladman	1. Craig Isherwood; 2. Gabrielle Peut	1. Robert Kennedy; 2. Kirsty O'Sullivan	1. Harris Sultan; 2. John Perkins
DLP candidates	Workers candidates	CNP candidates	Yellow Vest candidates	Health candidates
1. Jennifer Bowden; 2. Chris McCormack; 3. Kathryn Breakwell	1. Narelle Everard; 2. Kevin Gaynor	1. Bruce Stevens; 2. Rita Mazalevskis; 3. Benjamin Williamson	1. Siobhann Brown; 2. Terri Franklin	1. Isaac Golden; 2. Andrew Hicks
Group Z candidates	Ungrouped candidates			
1. Sunny Chandra; 2. Robert Whitehill	Kenneth Betts; Max Dicks; Murray McInnis; Karl Morris			

=== Western Australia ===
There were 67 Senate candidates for Western Australia.

Six seats were up for election. The Labor Party was defending two seats. The Liberal Party was defending two seats. The Greens were defending one seat. One Nation was defending one seat. Senators Michaelia Cash (Liberal), Mathias Cormann (Liberal), Sue Lines (Labor), Rachel Siewert (Greens), Dean Smith (Liberal) and Glenn Sterle (Labor) were not up for re-election.

Labor candidates	Liberal candidates	Greens candidates	One Nation candidates	Nationals candidates
1. Pat Dodson*; 2. Louise Pratt*; 3. Alana Herbert; 4. Tom French; 5. Varun Ghosh; 6. Alison Vaughan	1. Linda Reynolds*; 2. Slade Brockman*; 3. Matt O'Sullivan*; 4. Trischa Botha	1. Jordon Steele-John*; 2. Giz Watson; 3. Heather Lonsdale; 4. Bhuwan Khadka; 5. Jacqueline van Grootel; 6. Jordan Cahill	1. Peter Georgiou; 2. Martin Suter	1. Nick Fardell; 2. Siobhan Blake; 3. Louise Kingston
Conservatives candidates	UAP candidates	Christians candidates	LDP candidates	WAP candidates
1. Jonathan Crabtree; 2. Peter Castieau; 3. Matt Brazier	1. James McDonald; 2. Russell Sewell; 3. Patrick Hardwick	1. Ellen Joubert; 2. Trevor Young	1. John Gray; 2. Wesley Du Preez	1. Julie Matheson; 2. David Freilich; 3. Bruce Thompson; 4. Ron Norris; 5. Rod Bradley
Great Australian candidates	Socialist Alliance candidates	IMO candidates	AJP candidates	Flux candidates
1. Rod Culleton; 2. Wayne Glew	1. Petrina Harley; 2. Alex Salmon	1. Judith Wilyman; 2. Michelle Kinsella	1. Katrina Love; 2. Courtney Henry	1. Melissa Taaffe; 2. Leo Treasure
Pirate candidates	CNP candidates	HEMP candidates	CEC candidates	SFF candidates
1. Clive Myers; 2. Paul de Abel	1. David Archibald; 2. Meredith Campbell	1. Nick Lethbridge; 2. Mark Rayner	1. Jean Robinson; 2. Barry Mason	1. Stuart Ostle; 2. Ronald Lean
Health candidates	Yellow Vest candidates	Sustainable candidates	Ungrouped candidates	
1. Teddy Craies; 2. Emily Wallis	1. Debbie Robinson; 2. Catherine Gorman	1. Yasmin Bartlett; 2. Colin Scott	Valentine-Clive Pegrum; Ben Mullings (MHP); Glenn Hutchinson; Murray Jones; Brian Carew-Hopkins	

== Summary by party ==
Beside each party is the number of seats contested by that party in the House of Representatives for each state, as well as an indication of whether the party contested the Senate election in the respective state.

Party	NSW		Vic		Qld		WA		SA		Tas		ACT		NT		Total	
Party	HR	S	HR	S	HR	S	HR	S	HR	S	HR	S	HR	S	HR	S	HR	S
Australian Labor Party	47	*	38	*	30	*	16	*	10	*	5	*	3	*	2	*	151	8
Liberal Party of Australia	37	*	36	*			16	*	10	*	5	*	3	*			107	6
Liberal National Party of Queensland					30	*											30	1
National Party of Australia	12	*	4	*			3	*	1		3	*					23	4
Country Liberal Party (NT)															2	*	2	1
Australian Greens	47	*	38	*	30	*	16	*	10	*	5	*	3	*	2	*	151	8
United Australia Party	47	*	38	*	30	*	16	*	10	*	5	*	3	*	2	*	151	8
Pauline Hanson's One Nation	6	*	5	*	29	*	16	*	1	*	2	*					59	6
Fraser Anning's Conservative National Party	5	*	6	*	30	*	3	*	2	*	2	*		*		*	48	8
Animal Justice Party	12	*	16	*	6	*	1	*	10	*	1	*					46	6
Christian Democratic Party	42	*		*										*			42	3
Sustainable Australia	13	*	5	*	1	*		*		*		*		*			19	7
Western Australia Party							15	*									15	1
Rise Up Australia Party		*	11	*		*			1						2	*	14	4
Australian Christians							13	*									13	1
Liberal Democratic Party	4	*		*	5	*		*		*		*	1				10	6
Shooters, Fishers and Farmers Party	1	*	2	*		*	5	*		*		*					8	6
Democratic Labour Party		*	5	*	3	*											8	3
Derryn Hinch's Justice Party			8	*													8	1
Science Party	5	*	1				1										7	1
Katter's Australian Party					7	*											7	1
The Great Australian Party	1	*	2	*		*	1	*		*			1				5	5
Australian Progressives					1				1				3				5	
Australia First Party	1		1		1		1										4	
Socialist Equality Party	1	*	1	*	1												3	2
Socialist Alliance		*			2		1	*									3	2
Centre Alliance									3	*							3	1
Victorian Socialists			3														3	
Reason Australia			3														3	
Citizens Electoral Council		*	2	*		*		*		*		*				*	2	7
Australian Better Families	1	*				*						*					1	3
Australian Workers Party	1	*		*		*											1	3
Involuntary Medication Objectors (Vaccination/Fluoride) Party	1	*				*		*									1	3
Australian Democrats		*		*					1	*							1	3
Love Australia or Leave		*			1	*						*					1	3
VOTEFLUX.ORG	*		*				1	*									1	3
Non-Custodial Parents Party	1																1	
Child Protection Party									1								1	
Help End Marijuana Prohibition (HEMP) Party		*		*		*		*		*		*				*		7
Australian Conservatives		*		*		*		*		*		*						6
Pirate Party Australia		*		*		*		*										4
Health Australia Party		*		*				*										3
Independents For Climate Action Now		*		*		*												3
Climate Action! Immigration Action! Accountable Politicians!		*		*		*												3
The Small Business Party		*		*														2
Yellow Vest Australia				*				*										2
The Australian Mental Health Party						*		*										2
Australian Affordable Housing Party		*																1
Australian People's Party		*																1
The Together Party		*																1
The Women's Party		*																1
Seniors United Party of Australia		*																1
Republican Party of Australia				*														1
Secular Party of Australia				*														1
Jacqui Lambie Network												*						1
Independent and other	29	*	33	*	16	*	7	*	4	*	4	*	2	*	2	*	97	8

== Disendorsements and resignations ==
There were a number of disendorsements and resignations after the close of nominations on 23 April 2019. As the disendorsements and resignations took place after the close of nominations, their names and party affiliation will still appear on ballot papers.

Date	Party	Candidate	Seat	Details
13 March	United Australia	Bryan Wiseman	Cook	Resigned as candidate following the emergence that UAP campaign material was Made in China despite the party's stance on Local Jobs.
29 April	Labor	Wayne Kurnoth	Senate (NT)	Disendorsed due to "questionable" social media posts, including posting antisemitic conspiracy theories.
30 April	One Nation	Steve Dickson	Senate (Qld)	Resigned from all One Nation positions after footage of him groping and disparaging women at a Washington DC strip club were broadcast.
1 May	Liberal	Jeremy Hearn	Isaacs	Disendorsed after anti-Muslim comments he made in a 2018 online video were revealed.
1 May	Liberal	Peter Killin	Wills	Resigned after homophobic comments he made on a Christian activist blog come to light, directed at Liberal MP Tim Wilson.
3 May	Liberal	Jessica Whelan	Lyons	Resigned after anti-Muslim, anti-immigrant social media posts were revealed. Whelan initially suggested some social media posts were not hers, but later acknowledged she had made other inappropriate posts which had not been declared to the party.
3 May	Labor	Luke Creasey	Melbourne	Resigned after the release of sexist and misogynist jokes he had made in social media posts seven years earlier.
8 May	Greens	Jay Dessi	Lalor	Resigned as candidate following the emergence of racist jokes made on social media.
9 May	Liberal	Gurpal Singh	Scullin	Resigned as candidate after criticising a victim of rape, stating that her husband was the "real victim", having previously compared same-sex marriage to paedophilia.
9 May	United Australia	Tony Pecora	Melbourne	Disendorsed after social media posts were revealed in which he purported numerous conspiracy theories, including that "globalist forces" were responsible for the September 11 attacks.
14 May	Greens	David Paull	Parkes	Resigned as candidate following the emergence of conspiracy theories about the Port Arthur Massacre.

=== Candidate controversies ===
Date	Party	Candidate	Seat	Details
	One Nation	Dean Smith	O'Connor	Was a target of recruitment for Neo-Nazi group The Base. In secretly recorded tapes of his "interview" by a recruiter, Smith tells of his hatred of immigrants and his wish to "save the race". He tells the recruiter that he had become "more and more extreme and passionate about my views", and disillusioned with One Nation and the possibility of a political solution. However, he was deemed too great a risk for The Base because of his political profile, so was not admitted into their ranks.

=== Allegations of Chinese interference ===
In late 2019, media outlets around the world have reported on alleged efforts by the People's Republic of China to infiltrate the Parliament of Australia by recruiting a spy to run in a constituency during the 2019 Australian federal election.
