= Feminist Party =

The Feminist Party can be:

- The Feminist Party of Germany
- The Feminist Party of Canada (founded 1979, now defunct)
- The Feminist Party (United States), short lived vehicle for presidential campaign of Shirley Chisholm, founded by Florynce Kennedy
- The Feminist Party (Finland)
- An alternative name for several parties called the Feminist Initiative, the Women's Party, or the Women's List.
