= Women's Party =

Women's Party is the name of several political parties:

- The Women's Party (Australia)
- Women's Party (Finland); see List of political parties in Finland
- Women's Party (Greenland)
- Women's Party (Israel)
- Women's Party (Japan) Josei-tō; see List of political parties in Japan
- Women's Party (Poland)
- Women's Party (South Korea)
- Women's Party (Turkey)
- Women's Party (UK)
- Women's Party of Chile
- Women's Party of Iran

== See also ==
- Australian Women's Party (disambiguation)
- Feminist Party (disambiguation)
- National Woman's Party
- New Zealand Women's Political Party
- Party of Women (UK)
- Women's Equality Party (UK)
- Women's Equality Party (New York)
- Women's Rights Party (New Zealand)
