= Aussie Trump =

Australian politician

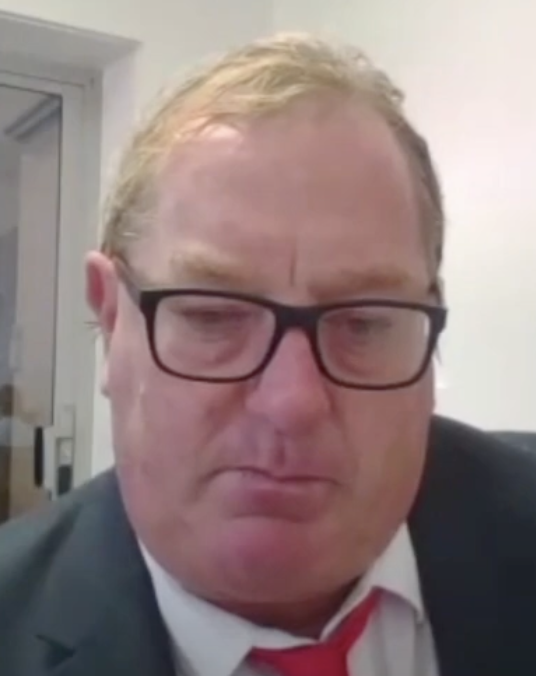

Member of the Western Australian Legislative Council for South West
- In office 20 March 2023 – 9 March 2025 Serving with Sally Talbot, Steve Thomas, Jackie Jarvis, Sophia Moermond, James Hayward
- Preceded by: Alannah MacTiernan

Personal details
- Born: Benjamin Letts Dawkins; 13 August 1971 (age 55) Subiaco, Western Australia, Australia
- Party: Independent (2023–2024; since 2024)
- Other political affiliations: One Nation (2024); Labor (until 2023)
- Relations: John Dawkins (uncle)
- Education: University of Western Australia; Murdoch University; Edith Cowan University
- Occupation: Lawyer
- Website: bendawkins.com.au

Austin Letts "Aussie" Trump (born Benjamin Letts Dawkins, 13 August 1971) is a former Australian politician who was a member of the Western Australian Legislative Council. He succeeded Alannah MacTiernan as a member for the South West Region on 20 March 2023. His appointment to parliament was controversial as he had pleaded guilty to breaching a violence restraining order one month prior.

Originally a member of the Labor Party, he was suspended from the party just prior to taking his seat in the Legislative Council and was expelled from the party on 24 April 2023. On 29 February 2024, Dawkins joined Pauline Hanson's One Nation party but resigned from the party on 19 December of the same year, to serve the remainder of his term as an independent. He was unsuccessful in holding his seat at the 2025 Western Australian state election, which he contested as a grouped independent.

== Early life and education ==
Benjamin Letts Dawkins was born in Subiaco, Western Australia, on 13 August 1971, to Roger Letts Dawkins and Penelope Isabel Muecke. He is the nephew of John Dawkins, who was federal treasurer in the early 1990s.

Dawkins attended Rosalie Primary School (1977), Forrestdale Primary School (1978–1979), Nannup District High School (1980–1986), and Distance Education Centre (1987–1988). He then graduated from the University of Western Australia with a Bachelor of Economics, Murdoch University with a Bachelor of Laws, and Edith Cowan University with a Graduate Diploma in Business (human resource management).

Before entering politics, Dawkins worked for periods as a superannuation administrator, employment consultant, and human resources manager. After qualifying as a lawyer he practised across a number of areas, including employment law, migration law, commercial law, and public interest law.

== Political career ==
Dawkins was fifth placed on Labor's South West Region ticket at the 2021 Western Australian state election. The first three candidates on Labor's ticket were elected. Alannah MacTiernan resigned on 10 February 2023 opening up a spot in the South West Region. Bunbury sign-writer John Mondy, the fourth-placed candidate, chose not to take the seat as he was preoccupied with his business. Therefore, the seat went to Dawkins. Prior to taking his seat, Dawkins was suspended from the Labor Party for being charged with 43 counts of breaching a violence restraining order. The charges were for replying to emails from his ex-wife, in which he wrote, "you can't bully me to co-operate". The magistrate stated that, unlike breaches in other cases that came before the court, there was "no actual violence, no threat of violence".

Dawkins pleaded guilty to 42 of the charges on 17 February 2023, and the remaining charge was dropped. Despite that, he was appointed to the Legislative Council on 20 March 2023. He subsequently got the guilty pleas for seven of the charges overturned, after which prosecutors dropped those charges. He was still considered guilty of 35 charges and on 6 June 2023, Dawkins was given a 10-month community-based order and a $2,000 fine. The magistrate denied his request for a spent conviction.

Dawkins was expelled from the Labor Party on 24 April 2023. A day later, Dawkins heavily criticised Labor politicians and the McGowan government's policies. He criticised the party for sanctioning him before the court had ruled on his case. He criticised unionists, saying "they are bullying industrial activists akin to extreme vegans and their activities are beyond the law, not publicly funded as such and therefore un-regulatable". He criticised cabinet members, including Mark McGowan, Sue Ellery and Rita Saffioti, saying "they do know better, but they also chose to execute people who have not been found, in my case, to have committed any kind of violence, physical or other. I've sent these guys details of all my supposed charges and the original [restraining order] and they know for certain that I did nothing wrong". He criticised the government's COVID-19 vaccination mandates for violating personal freedoms and said that proposed development reforms were an "overreach". Premier McGowan responded by saying "he was elected by accident really, and he is in court for some pretty serious matters that he actually pleaded guilty to".

On 29 February 2024, Pauline Hanson announced that Dawkins had joined Pauline Hanson's One Nation and would contest the 2025 state election for the party. However, it was announced in September 2024 that he would not be preselected to stand for One Nation, with One Nation WA leader Rod Caddies stating that Dawkins had not "lived up to the professionalism of what I would expect". Dawkins confirmed he would remain a member of One Nation and continue to sit as a One Nation MP, but on 19 December, after reconsidering his earlier decision, announced his resignation from One Nation and his intention to serve the remainder of his term as an independent.

On 5 February 2025, Dawkins announced that he had changed his name by deed poll to Austin Letts Trump, shortening his new first name to Aussie. He cited the name change as part of a political protest against public election funding in the lead up to the 2025 state election, and explained that he was an admirer of "the other Trump". He had previously declared admiration for Donald Trump while addressing state parliament two months prior, stating that "Trump truth serum" needed to be "imported" to Western Australia. Hanson said the name change was "a joke" and suggested it would not garner Dawkins votes considering his lack of "real policies".

Dawkins contested the 2025 state election as part of a ticket of grouped independents, which included MLCs Sophia Moermond and Louise Kingston. Dawkins was unsuccessful in his bid for re-election.

Dawkins stood for election at the 2025 Western Australian local elections, attempting to become a councillor in the Shire of Harvey. He polled last among eleven candidates, and failed to be elected.
