= Australian Women's Party =

Australian Women's Party may refer to:*

- Australian Women's Party (1943)
- Australian Women's Party (1995)
- The Women's Party (2018)
- Australian Women's Party (2019)

== See also ==
- Women's Party (disambiguation)
