= Australian Better Families =

- Abbreviation: ABF
- Founder: Leith Erikson
- Founded: 31 August 2018; 8 years ago
- Headquarters: Robina, Queensland
- Ideology: Anti-feminism; Men's rights
- National affiliation: Australian Brotherhood of Fathers
- Slogan: Better families for a Better Nation

Website
- www.betterfamilies.org.au

Australian Better Families (ABF) was an Australian political party registered on 31 August 2018 and deregistered by the Australian Electoral Commission on 13 October 2021 after failing to have 500 members. The party's focus was the rights and welfare of men within the Family Court of Australia system. The party was a branch of the Australian Brotherhood of Fathers organisation.

== Introduction ==
The Australian Better Families party was established in 2018 by Leith Erikson as a political arm of the Australian Brotherhood of Fathers.

Seven party members were candidates in the 2019 Australian federal election. Jewell Drury and Peter Moujalli were senate candidates for New South Wales; Darren Cauldfield, Adam Finch and Rodney Fox for Queensland; and Gregory Beck for Tasmania. Graham McFarland contested the Division of Greenway. None succeeded.

Between 2018 and 2020, party member Paul Gleeson was a member of the Redland City Council.

Pauline Hanson's One Nation party supported the Australian Better Families party by hosting party events and providing the party founders with a social media connection to One Nation party members.

== Policy ==
The party proposed that there be a federal government portfolio called Minister for Men. In 2020, Pauline Hanson expressed support for an Australian Minister for Men. A Minister for Men would complement the Minister for Women's remit.

While rejecting the classification of domestic violence as a gendered issue the party sought changes to family law in Australia in favour of the rights of men. For example, in 2020, the party suggested that there be a category of crime for "low-risk domestic violence" and the issue of women filing false domestic violence claims.

Through raising awareness, the party encouraged men to refuse to attend court to respond to domestic violence, apprehended violence, violence restraining orders and matters of instant offense unless they proceed to trial. Although such orders are produced in the civil court, to not attend as a respondent is a criminal offense.

The party opined that family court proceedings were biased towards victims (predominantly women) of domestic violence and that male victims of domestic violence should be recognised.

== Leith Erikson ==
The party's founder, Leith Erikson, is a men's rights activist. Erikson began a "#21fathers" movement, based on the discredited claim by Barry Williams and Sue Price that 21 Australian men commit suicide each week because of family law issues such as child support and domestic violence orders.

At a 2017 International Women's Day event at the Gold Coast, Queensland, Erikson contested the existence of a gender pay gap in Australia, suggesting that the unequal numbers of men and women in high positions of business and government was due to merit and not gender bias.

Erikson registered a small charity called End all Domestic Violence (Endalldv) with 11 volunteers (and no employees) which provided an Australian Government annual information statement in 2022.
