= Peter Dingle =

Australian scientist

Peter Dingle is an Australian scientist, who is a former associate professor at the School of Environmental Science at Murdoch University, in Perth, Australia.

In addition he co-presented SBS's Is Your House Killing You and appeared in ABC's Can We Help. Dingle once had a regular spot on 6PR radio Perth advising on health issues but during the inquest on his wife's death at the hands of a homeopath, was sacked by the station, who stated that its "duty of care was with our listeners" and doubted that he would return.

== Education ==
Peter Dingle has a Bachelor of Education from the State College of Victoria, a Bachelor of Science (Hons) and a PhD from Murdoch University.

== Research ==
Dingle's research interests include environmental and nutritional toxicology and health. His honours thesis investigated exposure to and health effects from domestic pesticides and his PhD investigated exposure to and health effects from formaldehyde in the home in 1994. Since 1994 he has been active in research on the role of the environment, nutrition and lifestyle contributors to chronic health conditions.

Dingle undertook research into the Mtech (Moletech) Fuel Saver with Murdoch University in 2008. In his report he concluded: "Mtech Fuel Saver reduces toxic emissions, reduces total greenhouse gas contribution and fuel consumption, possibly saving Australians hundreds of dollars worth of petrol". The Sydney Morning Herald reported in 2009 that the "Moletech Fuel Saver, has been removed from the market after an investigation in Western Australia" due to misleading claims made about the product.

== Time at Murdoch University ==
- Dingle was awarded a 'Teaching Excellence Award' by Murdoch University's VC in 2003.
- During his time at Murdoch he wrote books about; treating ailments without drugs, nutrition and illness, self-help/memory guidance, medical deceptions and myths, toxic exposure in homes, environmental management and education, bacterial contamination and danger in cosmetics.

== Position on autism ==
Dingle says autism is linked to the "(mal)nutrition of our children", and has made the claim that it is "apparent that many cases of autism and ADHD can actually be fixed by dietary changes". There is no scientific basis for this view.

== Death of Penelope Dingle ==
Dingle's first wife, Penelope, died in August 2005 from cancer following a failed attempt in 2003 to treat her using homeopathy and spirituality. Due to the delay in seeking competent medical care, the cancer spread and Penelope's weight dropped to 35 kilograms (77 lb). She eventually had a complete bowel obstruction forcing her to undergo an emergency operation of a palliative nature in October 2003, before she died in 2005. The State Coroner noted that Peter Dingle had not done enough to convince his wife to seek timely medical treatment, and that his inaction had contributed to her death. The Coroner also found that the symptoms had been present from at least as early as October 2001, while Penelope was under the care of homeopath Francine Scrayen (whom he described as "not a competent health professional") before finally consulting a doctor in December 2002. In early 2003, her cancer was diagnosed and she was presented with a treatment option which the Coroner found would have given her a "good chance of surviving". The Coroner also found that her decision to not undergo timely treatment by a competent health professional was "influenced by misinformation and bad science" and rejected Peter Dingle's extensive claims of his own memory loss around the time of Penelope's treatment.

== See also ==
- Jessica Ainscough
- Controversies in autism
- Wake Up! WA
- Judith Wilyman PhD controversy
