= Judy Wilyman =

Australian anti-vaccination activist

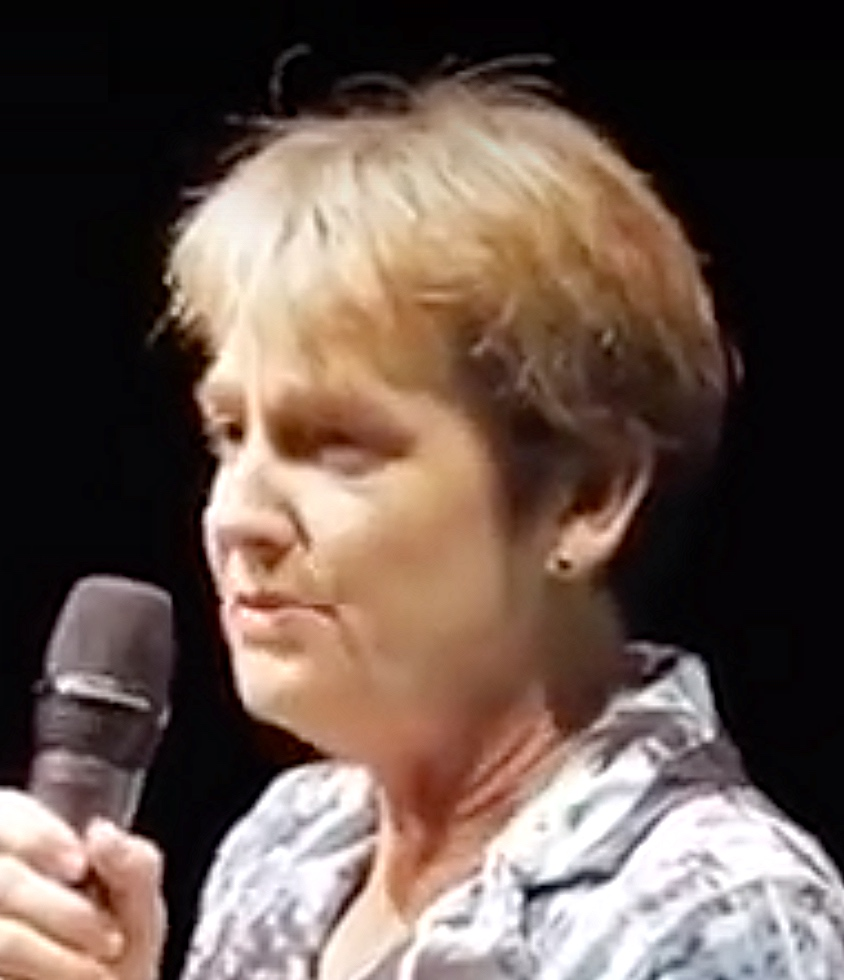
- Wilyman in 2016
- Education: University of Wollongong
- Known for: Anti-vaccination activism
- Political party: Informed Medical Options

Roslyn Judith "Judy" Wilyman is an Australian anti-vaccination activist who came to prominence following the controversial award of a humanities PhD titled "A critical analysis of the Australian government's rationale for its vaccination policy" by University of Wollongong. The thesis came under heavy criticism from multiple directions, including medical professionals, due to claims within the thesis, including advancing a conspiracy theory whereby the World Health Organization (WHO) and the pharmaceutical industry supposedly conspire to promote vaccinations in the absence of evidence of safety and efficacy. The awarding of the degree created questions about the standards being applied and whether or not the thesis supervisors and examiners had sufficient knowledge to oversee the research, and led to calls for the university to review the doctorate. A number of individuals and medical organisations – including academics and researchers from other parts of the University of Wollongong – spoke out against the findings of the thesis, emphasising the need for vaccinations in order to prevent serious disease; and the University of Wollongong was criticised for a perceived lack of transparency in their doctoral process and an alleged failure to uphold standards of scholarship.

The thesis was conducted from within the university's School of Humanities and Social Inquiry, under the primary supervision of cultural studies professor Brian Martin and the co-supervision of sociologist Andrew Whelan. Although describing himself as "hardly a neutral observer", Martin argued that the questions raised about the work equate to biased attacks on Wilyman and himself. The university responded to the criticism by asserting that the research was conducted and examined under high standards, and spoke in defence of academic freedom. The University of Wollongong also agreed to conduct a review into their overall doctoral process, but the scope did not include specific PhD recipients, and therefore did not address Wilyman's work.

Prior to the PhD, Wilyman had already received some attention for her assertion that the parents of Dana McCaffery, a child who died of pertussis, has "cashed in" on their daughter's death following the award of a prize to the McCafferys by Australian Skeptics – they had donated the money to charity.

More recently, she has been criticised for speaking at anti-vaccination events and for charging large sums for "expert reports" in court cases, despite having no medical qualifications.

== Background ==
Judith Wilyman was awarded a Masters by University of Wollongong (UOW) in 2007 in the Faculty of Law, Humanities and the Arts; her thesis topic was the Australian government's pertussis vaccine policy. Her thesis alleges a connection between vaccinations and autism, a claim that was already convincingly refuted, and false claims that vaccines do not control whooping cough.

By 2009, Wilyman was a member of the Australian Vaccination-risks Network (AVN), an anti-vaccination group, and coordinates two anti-vaccination groups; Vaccination Decisions and Vaccination Choice.

In 2011 Wilyman opposed the cancer-preventing HPV vaccination saying evidence about the vaccine's benefits were not clear, and it was reported that she claimed that vaccinations are linked to autism. HPV vaccination has significantly reduced rates of cervical cancer, and is thought to have the potential to eliminate it altogether.

In 2012 she caused controversy after the death of a child from whooping cough, questioning "whether the family had been paid to use their daughter's death to promote vaccine", causing the family of the deceased to request that Wilyman not use their daughter's death in furthering her agenda.

In 2013, the Australian Medical Association (AMA) criticised the university's decision to fund Wilyman to attend a conference in the US. Wilyman was provided with $3,000 by the university to present a paper opposing human papillomavirus (HPV) vaccinations. The conference was organised by predatory open access publishing company OMICS Publishing Group, which has also been criticised for running predatory meetings with no effective standards for speaker selection. In response to the criticism of Wilyman's trip, the university's Dean of Research, Tim Marchant, stated that the university upheld the principles of academic freedom and, accordingly, it was important to support Wilyman and the presentation of differing viewpoints, even when they were controversial. Brian Martin, who was supervising Wilyman's research, also supported the decision, arguing that attending the conference was a valuable experience for Wilyman.

Questions of misconduct concerning Wilyman's Masters thesis were raised in 2014, and were investigated and cleared in 2015.

The Australian reported that "Wilyman [was] shielded from critics" by the university in 2014 when their media office refused a request to promote the 44th Annual Scientific Meeting of the Australasian Society for Immunology, to be held at a Novotel Hotel in Wollongong. The reason given was that, if the conference "will be discussing vaccinations, we should steer well clear of doing any publicity. We don't want to inflame any opponents of ... Judy Wilyman." According to the university, they were attempting to limit "the vicious and repeated attacks being directed ... towards a then student"

== PhD award ==
Wilyman entered a PhD a program in 2007 in the same UOW Faculty as awarded her Masters, but with her research focus expanded to cover Australian vaccination policy more generally. In 2008, the supervision of her studies was transferred to Peter Dingle at Murdoch University, and returned to UOW in 2011 under Brian Martin. The thesis was accepted by UOW in 2016. Although details of the examiners have not been released, in May 2016 The Australian reported that one of two original examiners did not recommend that a PhD be granted. It was passed after a third academic evaluated the thesis and recommended changes.

The thesis came under heavy criticism from multiple directions, including medical professionals, due to claims within the thesis, including advancing a conspiracy theory that the World Health Organization (WHO) and the pharmaceutical industry supposedly conspire to promote vaccinations in the absence of evidence of safety and efficacy. The awarding of the thesis lead to criticism and questions about the standards being applied and whether or not the thesis supervisors and examiners had sufficient knowledge to oversee the research and led to calls for the university to review the doctorate. A number of individuals and medical organisations – including academics and researchers from other parts of the University of Wollongong – criticised the findings of the thesis, emphasising the need for vaccinations in order to prevent serious disease; and the University of Wollongong was criticised for a perceived lack of transparency in their doctoral process and an alleged failure to uphold standards of scholarship.

The university responded to the criticism by asserting that the research was conducted and examined under high standards, and spoke in defence of academic freedom. The University also agreed to conduct a review into their overall doctoral process, but the scope did not include specific PhD recipients, and therefore did not encompass Wilyman's work.

=== Doctoral claims ===
Biological scientist Helen Petousis-Harris writes that the thesis abstract contains conclusion, and quotes Wilyman's aim of her thesis as an attempt to "assess the rigour of the claims supporting the efficacy, safety and necessity for the use of an expanding number of vaccines in the Australian Government's National Immunisation Program". Brull reports that according to supervisor Martin, Wilyman's thesis makes four major points:

- Wilyman claims that the death rates from diseases in Australia had declined before most vaccines were introduced, leading to a suggestion that other factors may have had a role in the reduced infection rate.
- It is alleged in the thesis that Australia's vaccination policy follows international models, rather than being based on local conditions.
- In her thesis, Wilyman claims that there is a conflict of interest when research on vaccination is conducted by pharmaceutical companies.
- She alleges that some areas of research which relate to vaccination policy have not been examined, even though there may be value in doing so.

Other, more specific, claims include that the World Health Organization (WHO) formed a secret committee, which in turn orchestrated "hysteria relating to a global swine flu pandemic in 2009" and that the organisation is "perceived to be out of touch with global communities and … controlled by the interests of corporations and the World Bank".

At one stage during Wilyman's candidature, Australian immunisation expert and advisor to the WHO Peter McIntyre offered to advise her on her research, but withdrew his offer as she was "not willing to entertain" alternative points of view that contradicted her beliefs. Wilyman's PhD thesis falsely claims that "diseases for which vaccines are recommended have not been demonstrated to be a serious risk to the majority of children".

Medical academics and the Australian Medical Association (AMA) have questioned whether Martin had sufficient knowledge to supervise the thesis, with McIntyre observing "No doubt the examiners selected have credentials within that area of study but they are likely to lack necessary credentials in health sciences that would enable them to be aware of the full picture here". Similarly, an editorial in The Australian was harshly critical of both Wilyman and the University. It dismissed the central idea of the thesis as "rather like a sociologist who insists that jet aircraft remain aloft only because of a conspiracy between aeronautical engineers and greedy airlines" and noted the problem of academic overreach, with the faculty presuming to judge the quality of work well outside its area of expertise. It characterised the University of Wollongong as putting itself on the wrong side in a "battle of life and death", and questioned whether the granting of the PhD "could 'reasonably be expected' to lead to lower levels of vaccination?"

=== Academic health science sector responses ===
University of Auckland biological scientist Helen Petousis Harris, who has a PhD in Vaccinology, was highly critical of the thesis and writes:

Wilyman's "references to support these outrageous comments are from the bottom dwelling literature that includes 50-year-old discussions along with well-established, thoroughly debunked pseudoscience. At no point does she mention any of the vast scientific literature that includes large clinical and epidemiological studies - or attempt a critique of it."
"It is [a] litany of deceitful reveries. How it could possibly pass as a piece of Doctoral level work is inexplicable and it has made no contribution to knowledge. Shame on you University of Wollongong."

Saxon Smith, president of the NSW branch of the AMA, characterised it as "a thesis that's talking about the science of medicine without any support of its argument from credible scientific literature", adding "the evidence is clear about the safety of vaccines."

Alison Campbell, an associate dean and biological sciences lecturer at the University of Waikato, produced a blistering analysis criticising the use of out-of-date references as well as pointing out numerous scientific errors in Wilyman's master's work, including calling the unexplained exclusion of two of four types of vaccine components "an alarming omission for a paper on immunisation".

The Medical Journal of Australia criticised the university in awarding a PhD to a student "demonstrating a glaring lack of understanding of immunology and vaccine science," suggesting that unless legislation keeps the anti-vaccination movement in check "we are ushering in a dangerous time."

John Dwyer AO, emeritus professor of medicine at the University of New South Wales, wrote: "[Ms Wilyman] has endorsed a conspiracy theory where all sorts of organisations with claimed vested interests are putting pressure on WHO to hoodwink the world into believing that vaccines provide more benefits than they cause harm. Many well-established concepts in science are being challenged in this thesis with no data to support the conclusions provides [sic]." He pointed out that numerous leading scientists and at least five major scientific organisations are criticising the university for rewarding poor scholarship and asking that the thesis be re-examined by experts in immunology and epidemiology, which is what the thesis addresses.

In a February 2016 media-release the Royal Australasian College of Physicians (RACP) directly questioned suggestions of bias from Wilyman. In challenging central arguments of her thesis, the RACP highlighted that the TGA is the regulatory body responsive to the monitoring and investigation of any adverse events and any significant concerns around vaccination safety.

=== University response ===
Responding to the criticism of the thesis from several medical researchers and public health advocates who called for a review by the university's academic board, the university reiterated that research is conducted under strict standards, and that they do not "restrict the subjects into which research may be undertaken just because they involve public controversy or because individuals or groups oppose the topic or the findings".

In January 2016, the Vice Chancellor of the university, Paul Wellings, announced a review into the doctoral process. However, the review did not examine specific doctorates, and therefore did not look at the awarding of Wilyman's PhD. Upon completion, the university's report found that their higher degree research policies and procedures were consistent with those at other comparable Australian universities. Immunology academic John Dwyer noted that even though the university's review made some "excellent recommendations for improving the postgraduate research students' experience", it "failed to address the vital question of matching the scientific question to be examined to the expertise of the supervisor and the ultimate reviewers".

According to the university, all theses are examined by two people with "unchallengeable knowledge in the field of study", but the university does not reveal the identities of the examiners or their respective academic fields. In March 2016, the university's compliance officer turned down a request to identify the examiners, arguing that "the examiners would be offended, humiliated or intimidated by the conduct of the media and the public once their names are released", concerned for "their physical, psychological or emotional wellbeing" and noting that current privacy laws forbid the release of the information.

John Dwyer AO responded that the names of examiners would not have been required if the university had agreed to re-examine the thesis, adding "as we know they are social scientists not clinical scientists". In a rebuttal the Australian Skeptics considers UOW's statement of a possible "detrimental effect on the [examiner's] physical ... wellbeing" to be verging on a libellous depiction, as it "suggest[s] that the community critical of the PhD may physically attack the examiners".

=== Remonstrations ===
In response to UOW and Wilyman's thesis an online petition called Stop the University of Wollongong's Spread of Disease and Death Via Anti-Vaccination PhD was established in January 2016 and attracted over 2,100 signatures within the first few weeks. The petition reportedly states that UOW's acceptance of the thesis "demonstrates an anti-scientific culture at the University of Wollongong that is inimical to scholarship".

At the same time over sixty of the university's health and medical academics and researchers jointly signed a statement that "the evidence is clear" in support of vaccination urging all parents to ensure their children are fully immunised, Public Health Association of Australia president Heather Yeatman said the 65 academics wanted to clarify the scientific position and point out they are firmly behind vaccination and that "Universities need to publish papers based on sound evidence and the balance of evidence in relation to any matter".

A week later, representatives from 12 medical research and clinical societies also signed a supporting statement on behalf of 5,000 scientists and clinicians in the fields of microbiology, virology, immunology and infectious diseases concerned about vaccine-preventable diseases in the community. Eminent research biologist Sir Gustav Nossal was one of signatories, and Jonathan Iredale who drafted the statement said "It's not about academic freedom; it's an academic issue. If the thesis comes from poor scholarship then that is something the university must deal with".

In the Elsevier journal Vaccine three months later, UoW's executive dean of the Faculty of Science, Medicine and Health, researcher and toxicologist Alison Jones, co-authored a paper in-part referring to Wilyman, and in discussing the balance of good public health versus unchecked academic freedom stated:

"there is the very real potential for feral academic liberty and free speech to do harm ... this is particularly pertinent in the field of child health, where two recent controversial "scholarly" vaccine contributions ... could undermine community confidence in immunisation and immunisation uptake ... by suggesting scientific doubt where doubt is not warranted on the basis of the evidence available... [Wilyman has] repeated the discredited claims of a link between vaccines and autism, without providing compelling scientific evidence to support her claim".

Martin responded to Durrheim and Jones, arguing that they had misrepresented parts of Wilyman's work.

McIntyre, a senior doctor at the Westmead Children's Hospital, said that Wollongong University "must bear the major responsibility for manifestly inadequate supervision", saying: "It is clear from even cursory examination that Wilyman's thesis, although raising some legitimate questions about gaps in both the process and transparency of immunisation policy development, is based on a highly selective and poorly informed review of the literature, driven by the imperative to support pre-determined conclusions."

=== Peer review ===
The March 2019 issue of the journal Vaccine published an article titled "PhD thesis opposing immunisation: Failure of academic rigour with real-world consequences" that stated in its conclusion that Wilyman's "thesis is notable for its lack of evidence of systematic literature review. Despite its extensive claims, there is no primary research, but there is abundant evidence of strong bias in selecting the literature cited and sometimes outright misrepresentation of facts." The authors also criticised Wilyman's use of her PhD to position herself as an expert witness in a family law court case over immunisation.

== After graduation ==
Within two months of University of Wollongong publishing the thesis it was reported that Wilyman was claiming her "PhD provides evidence that all vaccines are not safe and effective and that the combined schedule of vaccines is doing more harm than good in the population through the increase in chronic illness".

In June 2016 The Australian reported that Wilyman was an audience member at a vaccination forum run by the Telethon Kids Research Institute in Perth. Anti-vaccination activists at the event accused the forum members of lying, and heckled, interjected and continuously interrupted the speakers, forcing the event to close early.

Wilyman wrote an open letter to Paul Wellings, the Vice Chancellor of the University of Wollongong asking the university to correct alleged inaccuracies in the Wikipedia article about her research, asserting that criticism of her thesis in the media and by individual scientists was not "a proper scientific debate (but) suppression of the literature using political strategies". She also criticised Alison Jones, a Wollongong academic, for using the university's website to publicise "personal opinions of vaccination". The university responded by saying that they do not endorse or otherwise the views of students or academic staff, and do not curate Wikipedia.

Wilyman, Martin and the Faculty were awarded the satirical Australian Skeptics 2016 Bent Spoon Award for "a PhD thesis riddled with errors, misstatements, poor and unsupported 'evidence' and conspiratorial thinking".

During the COVID-19 pandemic, Wilyman questioned whether there really was a pandemic saying "do not lock down a healthy population under the guidelines of 'social distancing' for a global pandemic when there is no evidence of that pandemic", and challenged health advice by saying "that if you accept this social distancing and banning of gatherings of more than two people, [which] is clearly about population control and not the control of this infectious disease outbreak… then you are accepting the new norm and you've already lost your freedom".

== Masters thesis investigation ==
Wilyman was previously investigated and cleared by the university after allegations relating to her 2007 Masters thesis. After investigating the allegations and clearing Wilyman in 2015, the university declined to publicly release details, but under a Freedom of Information request a small number of documents were released after the Information & Privacy Commission of NSW intervened. In March 2016 there was a further release of hundreds of heavily redacted pages relating to the investigation, after the initial response was appealed. In what text was left unredacted, it showed that the complaint was referred to a high-level conduct committee, which dismissed the complaint after a two-month investigation and took no further action. The documents revealed that Judy Raper, the university's Deputy Vice Chancellor of Research, wrote to Wilyman after the investigation saying that it should not have occurred, that she was "sincerely sorry for this to have happened", and that "academic misconduct processes are not a forum for academic debate".

== Political career ==
Wilyman ran in the 2019 Australian federal election as a candidate for the Western Australia senate as a member of the anti-vaccination/anti-fluoridation, Involuntary Medication Objectors (Vaccination/Fluoride) Party. She was not successful, receiving a very small number of votes (594 on first preference, 0.04% of total; and 3,122 ticket votes, 0.22% of total).
