= Louise Kingston =

Western Australian politician (born 1965)

Member of the Western Australian Legislative Council for South West Region
- In office 19 September 2023 – 22 May 2025
- Preceded by: James Hayward

Personal details
- Born: Louise Maree Kingston; 8 June 1965 (age 61) Albany, Western Australia
- Party: Independent (since 2024)
- Other political affiliations: Nationals (2015–2024)

Louise Kingston (born 8 June 1965) is an Australian former politician who served as a member of the Western Australian Legislative Council, representing the South West Region.

== Early life and career ==
Kingston was born in Albany. She previously worked as the state secretary of Timber Communities Australia, and as an executive officer for the Small Business Centre and the Warren Blackwood Alliance of Councils. Before being elected, Kingston worked as the manager of the Manjimup Community Resource Centre. She also ran an engineering business and farm with her husband.

=== Previous elections ===
Kingston joined the Nationals in 2015, and first stood for election at the 2017 state election in second place on the Nationals ticket for the South West region of the Legislative Council. At the 2019 federal election, Kingston ran for the Senate in third place on the Nationals ticket. She ran in the second place on the Nationals ticket for the South West region of the Legislative Council at the 2021 state election, but was not elected.

== Politics ==
Although Kingston was unsuccessful at the 2021 election, fellow Nationals candidate James Hayward did win the seat, but was convicted in August 2023 of child sex offences, disqualifying him from parliament. After his disqualification, a recount was to be performed to determine the next most popular candidate. The recount was performed by the Western Australian Electoral Commission on 19 September 2023, resulting in Kingston's election.

Kingston was sworn in on 28 September 2023. In her maiden speech, she attracted attention for her comments mourning the demise of the Australian whaling industry, which she said was based on "a shift in conscientiousness based on feelings, not facts". Kingston was immediately elevated to the shadow cabinet as the shadow minister for climate action and shadow minister for regional cities. Following the defection of Merome Beard from the Nationals to the Liberals, Kingston also took up the tourism portfolio.

In June 2024, Kingston was preselected for fifth place on the National Party's Legislative Council ticket for the 2025 state election: considering a party would need to receive 13% of the vote for their fifth-placed candidate to be elected, far above the Nationals's recent electoral results, Kingston's position was considered unwinnable. However, Kingston resigned from the party later the same month, citing "relentless bullying and harassment" from party leader Shane Love, and alleged that her unfavourable preselection was the result of a deliberate campaign to punish her. Love and the party's administration denied Kingston's allegations, suggesting that her resignation was motivated only by her poor performance in preselection.

In December 2024, it was reported that Kingston would seek re-election to the Legislative Council at the 2025 state election on a joint ticket called "Vote Independent WA". Kingston ran alongside fellow independent MLCs Ben Dawkins (originally a member of the Labor Party and later of One Nation) and Sophia Moermond (originally a member of Legalise Cannabis) and candidate Adrian Perrot. Kingston said the group had "completely separate" policies and would not campaign together. None were elected.

== After politics ==
In late 2025, Kingston contributed to the launch of the Australian Rights Coalition, a lobby group supporting access to the "five Fs": firearms, fishing, four-wheel driving, farming, and forestry.

== Personal life ==
Kingston moved to Manjimup in 2001. She is married, with four children and three grandchildren.
