= Brian Martin (social scientist) =

Social scientist, study of dissent, peace studies (born 1947)

- Born: 1947 (age 78–79)
- Education: Rice University, (BA in Physics); University of Sydney (PhD)
- Occupations: Social scientist at University of Wollongong (social study of dissent, peace studies); formerly mathematician at Australian National University
- Years active: 1973–present
- Employer: University of Wollongong

Brian Martin (born 1947) is a social scientist in the School of Humanities and Social Inquiry, Faculty of Arts, Social Sciences and Humanities, at the University of Wollongong (UOW) in NSW, Australia. He was appointed a professor at the university in 2007, and in 2017 was appointed emeritus professor. His work is in the fields of peace research, scientific controversies, science and technology studies, sociology, political science, media studies, law, journalism, freedom of speech, education and corrupted institutions, as well as research on whistleblowing and dissent in the context of science. Martin was president of Whistleblowers Australia from 1996 to 1999 and remains their International Director. He has been criticized by medical professionals and public health advocates for promoting the disproven oral polio vaccine AIDS hypothesis and supporting vaccine hesitancy in the context of his work.

Martin has spoken at a British Science Association Festival of Science, and testified at the Australian Federal Senate's Inquiry into Academic Freedom. The crustacean Polycheles martini was named after him.

== Biography ==
Martin was born in the United States in 1947 and raised in Tulsa, Oklahoma. He earned a BA in physics at Rice University in Texas in 1969, and, seeking to avoid conscription into the Vietnam War, emigrated to Australia, where he earned a PhD in physics at the University of Sydney in 1976.

== Research and academia ==
Martin's original academic field was theoretical physics, and he worked in both stratospheric modelling and numerical methods during his career. He has published extensively about the social dynamics and politicisation of controversial scientific topics. His topics of inquiry have included the globalization of polarised science such as the origin of HIV/AIDS. He argues that there are situations in which scientific research that threatens vested interests can be suppressed. He describes a number of direct and indirect mechanisms through which he argues that this can occur, ranging from the denial of funds and the denial of promotion and tenure, through to the creation of a "general climate of fear". Martin's work on in this area has provided what Delborne describes as a "key foundation for conceptualizing scientific dissent".

Martin has been active in the criticism of university systems. He has criticized conflicts of interest where universities are managing internal investigations that may lead to bad publicity, and recommends having independent groups investigate allegations of misconduct; he has written about the unauthorised use of research produced by students and junior researchers by senior academics; and he has been outspoken against sexual relationships between staff and students. He also reports that any bias within universities could simply be due to students strategically working in-line with the biases of their teachers.

Martin believes that if complainants go through the official channels the outcome is very predictable, in that the organisation's internal grievance procedures, or making a complaint to the relevant ombudsman, does not work. He also believes whistleblower laws do not work, saying; "Not only are whistleblower laws flawed through exemptions and in-built weaknesses but in their implementation they are rarely helpful".

== Controversies ==
=== Academic freedom ===
Martin was subjected to an attempted academic gag when he published material about the forced retirement of a University of Adelaide academic. His university instructed him to remove the content from his website after Adelaide University threatened to sue. Martin's published material in question is now found on other websites.

In April 2001, Martin published an article in defence of Edward J. Steele, a sacked academic at UOW in the national newspaper The Australian. In a response published in the same paper, the Vice-Chancellor of Murdoch University Steven Schwartz accused Martin of a position supporting the concept of a "laissez-faire attitude towards academic freedom (in which all sides are presented impartially)" saying his "approach to academic freedom is neither logical nor practical" as this approach "forces universities to abandon their most cherished values: scholarship, wisdom and truth".

=== Vaccines ===
Martin has offered support for the discredited proposal that oral polio vaccine caused AIDS. The hypothesis first came to notice in Rolling Stone magazine by way of journalist Curtis and AIDS activist Elswood in 1992, and was later further promoted by the journalist/writer Hooper and Martin, with Hooper crediting Martin for giving the OPV-AIDS link hypothesis "further publicity and credibility". Martin disputes the claim that he has been a supporter of the hypothesis, instead saying that he has "never argued in favour of the OPV theory", but has instead stated "that it was and remains worthy of consideration yet in many ways has been unfairly dismissed". A 2016 article in The Australian described Martin's 2010 paper as claiming "that medical researchers had colluded to silence the theory that the AIDS virus was caused by contaminated polio vaccines in 1950s Africa."

Immunologist and research scientist Greg Woods refuted Martin's posit on the Tasmanian devil facial tumour disease stating Martin's 2014 paper in The Conversation on the theory behind the cancer "misrepresents the state of the science".

In 2014, Martin published a paper characterising criticism of Andrew Wakefield's discredited claims about vaccines and autism as "suppression of vaccination dissent". In 2016, an Agence Science-Presse piece accused Martin of defending "the idea of a vaccine-autism link." However, Martin disputes this, saying: "I have never defended this idea." The Australian reported that "Martin is a former paid member of the anti-vaccine Australian Vaccination Network", and that Martin states that he is also a member of the American Skeptics Society.

Martin has been criticised for his role in the Judith Wilyman PhD controversy where medical academics and the AMA raised concerns of whether Martin had the necessary knowledge to assess her doctorate which discussed vaccine science. The Australian has criticised him as not recognising academic rigour over academic freedom, and surgeon John Cunningham called on the university to have the thesis "reviewed by people whom have knowledge of vaccinations".

In 2016, the Australian Skeptics criticised Martin's supervision of Wilyman by presenting Martin, Wilyman and the Social Sciences Department of the University of Wollongong the satirical Bent Spoon Award for awarding "a PhD thesis riddled with errors, misstatements, poor and unsupported 'evidence' and conspiratorial thinking".

== Publications ==
=== Books ===
- Truth tactics (Sparsnäs, Sweden: Irene Publishing, 2021)
- Official channels (Sparsnäs, Sweden: Irene Publishing, 2020)
- Jørgen Johansen and Brian Martin. Social defence (Sparsnäs, Sweden: Irene Publishing, 2019)
- Vaccination panic in Australia (Sparsnäs, Sweden: Irene Publishing, 2018)
- The deceptive activist (Sparsnäs, Sweden: Irene Publishing, 2017).
- Ruling tactics: methods of promoting everyday nationalism, how they serve rulers and how to oppose them (Sparsnäs, Sweden: Irene Publishing, 2017).
- Nonviolence Unbound (Sparsnäs, Sweden: Irene Publishing, 2015).
- The Controversy Manual (Sparsnäs, Sweden: Irene Publishing, 2014).
- Doing Good Things Better (Sparsnäs, Sweden: Irene Publishing, 2013)
- Justice Ignited: The Dynamics of Backfire, (Lanham, MD: Rowman & Littlefield, 2007).
- (with Wendy Varney). Nonviolence Speaks: Communicating against Repression, (Cresskill, NJ: Hampton Press, 2003).
- Nonviolence versus capitalism, (London: War Resisters' International, 2001).
- Technology for Nonviolent Struggle, (London: War Resisters' International, 2001).
- (with Lyn Carson). Random Selection in Politics, (Westport, CT: Praeger, 1999).
- The Whistleblower's Handbook: How to Be an Effective Resister, (Charlbury, UK: Jon Carpenter; Sydney: Envirobook, 1999). Updated and republished 2013 as Whistleblowing: a practical guide, (Sparsnäs, Sweden: Irene Publishing)
- Information Liberation, (London: Freedom Press, 1998).
- Tied Knowledge: Power in Higher Education, (self-published, 1998).
- Suppression Stories, (Wollongong: Fund for Intellectual Dissent, 1997).
- Social Defence, Social Change, (London: Freedom Press, 1993).
- Scientific Knowledge in Controversy: The Social Dynamics of the Fluoridation Debate, (Albany: State University of New York Press, 1991).
- (with C. M. Ann Baker, Clyde Manwell & Cedric Pugh) Intellectual Suppression: Australian Case Histories, Analysis and Responses, (Sydney: Angus & Robertson, 1986) ISBN 0207151326
- Uprooting war, (London: Freedom Press, 1984).ISBN 978-0900384264
- The Bias of Science (Society for Social Responsibility in Science, 1979) ISBN 0909509131

=== Journal articles in the physical sciences ===
His most cited papers are:

- Davies, Brian; Martin, Brian (1 October 1979). "Numerical inversion of the laplace transform: a survey and comparison of methods". Journal of Computational Physics. 33 (1): 1–32. Bibcode:1979JCoPh..33....1D. doi:10.1016/0021-9991(79)90025-1. ISSN 0021-9991.
- Hess, David; Martin, Brian (1 June 2006). "Repression, Backfire, and The Theory of Transformative Events". Mobilization: An International Quarterly. 11 (2): 249–267. doi:10.17813/maiq.11.2.3204855020732v63. ISSN 1086-671X.
- Martin, Brian; Richards, Evelleen (1995). "Scientific Knowledge, Controversy, and Public Decision Making". Handbook of Science and Technology Studies. SAGE Publications, Inc.: 506–526. doi:10.4135/9781412990127.d30. ISBN 978-0-7619-2498-2.

=== Other journal articles (selection) ===
- Brian Martin (1990). Captives of Controversy: The Myth of the Neutral Social Researcher in Contemporary Scientific Controversies, Science, Technology, & Human Values, Vol. 15, No. 4, Fall 1990, pp. 474–494
- Martin, Brian (1996). "Sticking a Needle into Science: The Case of Polio Vaccines and the Origin of AIDS". Social Studies of Science. 26 (2): 245–276. doi:10.1177/030631296026002003. S2CID 146463905.
- Juan Miguel Campanario & Brian Martin (2004). Challenging dominant physics paradigms, Journal of Scientific Exploration, vol. 18, no. 3, Fall 2004, pp. 421–438.
- David Hess & Brian Martin (2006). Repression, backfire, and the theory of transformative events Mobilization, Vol. 11, No. 1, June 2006, pp. 249–267.
- Martin, Brian (2015). "On the Suppression of Vaccination Dissent". Science and Engineering Ethics. 21 (1): 143–157. doi:10.1007/s11948-014-9530-3. PMID 24658876. S2CID 9824788. Published online: 23 March 2014.
