= Wake Up! WA =

- Also known as: Wake Up Perth!
- Genre: Breakfast program
- Created by: Carol Wallbank
- Country of origin: Australia
- Original language: English
- No. of seasons: 4
- No. of episodes: 500+

Production
- Production locations: Perth, Albany, Bunbury
- Running time: 60 minutes including commercials

Original release
- Network: Access 31
- Release: September 2005 – 6 August 2008

Wake Up! WA was a breakfast television show broadcast in Western Australia. It was broadcast on Access 31 from 2005 until the station's demise in 2008.

== Overview ==
Wake Up! WA was a forum for Western Australians to discuss the latest matters affecting West Australian life. Guests often represented local charities, community or sporting organisations. The show updated viewers on local news, sport, weather, fuel prices and current affairs. With the success of Wake Up! WA, many opportunities became available for new talent to have real world experience in live television production that would otherwise be impossible.

Jason Weeks, host of the show since its inception, interviewed more than 2,000 prominent politicians, business people, charitable bodies, sporting groups and community organisations. Demelza Goudie, a Western Australian music buff and community radio announcer took over from Sarah Lawrence as co-host for two seasons. Lawrence was originally brought on after the departure of the original co-host, Lisa Cooney, while the news and weather positions were available on a rotational basis for those brave enough to face the early morning starts for no pay. To split the workload, in 2007 the show was hosted on Mondays and Tuesdays by Edwina Nattrass and Matt Hern, a former regular guest presenter who provided viewers with financial advice. For the rest of the week, the journalist and presenter Anita Tassone hosted alongside Weeks, the only on-air team member to have been with the show since its inception. The final season, in 2008, had Tassone and Weeks hosting the show full-time, providing a minimum of four interviews per day, on a variety of socially relevant topics. Because of continued growth, the last seasons of Wake Up! WA were also uploaded to ISP iinet's server for their subscribers to watch in their media lounge.

== History ==
Previously known as Wake Up Perth!, the show began broadcasting in September 2005. The show's presenters were chosen through a reality TV show called Your Big Break. This involved auditioning over 300 people for the available roles, through a weekend workshop to test contestants' ability to think fast, react to a changing environment, and not take themselves seriously. The original cast members were Jason Weeks and Lisa Cooney as hosts, Jo Newman on news and Alisa presenting sport and weather.

Originally intended as a 12-week program, the popularity of the show ensured its future. With its growing popularity in 2006, Wake Up WA began rebroadcasting the live show each day (7-8 am) in a later time slot (10.30-11.30 am) to allow more viewers to watch the program. In less than a year, by mid-2006, the show had reached 300 original episodes, joining only a few locally produced shows that had ever reached this mark so soon.

In early 2006, Wake Up Perth! was nominated for four Antenna Awards, winning the award for Best New Producer. In 2008, the show won Antenna Awards for Best News and Current Affairs Program.

On August 6, 2008, Access 31 ceased transmission. At the time, Wake Up! WA had an estimated audience of 45,000 viewers for the live show, with another 25-30,000 tuning in for the daily rebroadcast. Over 500 episodes of the show had been produced. The producers had weighed up alternative broadcast options at the time, which ultimately did not eventuate.

== Regular guests ==
- Peter Fitzpatrick - Motor Trade Association
- Allan Stiles - Grand Cinemas
- Kylie Mathieson - Emerge One
- Marnie Giroud - Wild Things
- Grant Girdwood - Motoring
- Peter Dingle - Murdoch University
- Peter Nattrass - Former Lord Mayor of Perth
- Mathias Cormann - Senator for Western Australia
