= Feminist Initiative =

There are several political organisations called the Feminist Initiative:

- Feminist Initiative (Sweden), a feminist Swedish political party
- Feminist Initiative (Norway), a feminist Norwegian political party
- Feminist Initiative (Denmark), a feminist Danish political party
- Iniciativa Feminista (Spain), a feminist Spanish political party
- Feminist Initiative (Poland), a feminist Polish political party
- FemINist INitiative of Canada, a movement to form a moderate feminist political party in Canada
