= Love Australia or Leave =

- Leader: Kim Vuga
- Founded: 2016; 10 years ago
- Dissolved: 12 January 2022; 4 years ago
- Headquarters: Townsville, Queensland
- Ideology: Australian ultranationalism Anti-immigration; Anti-Islam
- Political position: Far-right

Love Australia or Leave was a far-right Australian political party. The party was founded by Kim Vuga, a Townsville woman who came to prominence as a reality contestant in the SBS Television program Go Back to Where You Came From. which sought to expose ordinary Australians to the situations faced by refugees and asylum seekers.

The party platform included opposition to immigration, Opposition to Islam, and removal of Australia from the United Nations. The Global Project Against Hate and Extremism released a report on 5 October 2022, where it classified the party as an "anti-immigrant" and "anti-Muslim" group.

The party was registered in October 2016. Its founder Kim Vuga unsuccessfully stood for election in the federal election in July 2016 as an independent candidate to represent Queensland in the Australian Senate. She used the slogan "Love Australia or Leave" which has become the name of her party. It intended to be registered and stand candidates in the 2017 Queensland state election, but did not field any candidates at that election.

In 2017, Kim Vuga along with other far-right groups falsely circulated the claim that Australia's first female Muslim MP, Dr Anne Aly had refused to lay a wreath at an Anzac Day ceremony in Perth. Dr Aly stated it was obvious why she was being targeted by the group. Vuga later apologised via Facebook for spreading the rumour.

The party ran candidates at the 2019 Australian federal election: one for the lower house seat of Fisher, two Senate candidates (Vuga and Gavin Wyatt) in Queensland, and one ungrouped Senate candidate in each of New South Wales and Tasmania.

The party was de-registered on 12 January 2022 by the Australian Electoral Commission for failing to meet the increased registration requirement of 1500 members.

== Federal parliament ==
House of Representatives
Election year	# of overall votes	% of overall vote	# of overall seats won	+/–	Government
2019	1,564	0.01 (#31)	0 / 150	0	

Senate
Election year	# of overall votes	% of overall vote	# of overall seats won	# of overall seats	+/–	Notes
2019	10,099	0.07 (#38)	0 / 40	0 / 76	0	

== See also ==
- Islamophobia in Australia
- List of political parties in Australia
- Australian nationalism
- Far-right politics in Australia
