= Minister for men =

Proposed government minister

A minister for men is a proposed government minister, which would be a counterpart of a minister for women. There are no countries with a minister for men.

== Views ==
=== United Kingdom ===
In 2003 and 2004 David Amess and Lord Northbourne suggested a minister for men respectively. Lord Northbourne said that there is a minister for women and one for children, which he said assumes that men do not have problems, saying that "there are significant groups of men that also suffer disadvantage" and "If the government feels they need a minister to address womens' [sic] issues, it should be the same for men".

In 2015 Tim Samuels, writing for The Daily Telegraph, mentioned that there are ministerial portfolios for children and families and not men and a minister for women, but none for men. He mentioned that while men have advantages, men who are not at the top of society do have issues, such as a suicide rate of 3.5 times the female rate, being outperformed than girls in education and being more likely to be suspended, making up the majority of the prison population, and isolation in older men. In 2023 British MP Nick Fletcher proposed appointing a minister for men, mentioning underachievement in education of males compared to females and lower rates of university enrolment for 18-year-old males. He cited research saying that 41% of sixth form boys were told that "boys are a problem for society", which he believes is a wrong approach. He also mentioned a study finding that 29% of men felt ignored. He said that a strategy should be created to address male victims of domestic and sexual violence and improving education. Writing for The Guardian, Martha Gill disagreed with Fletcher, criticising the idea of having a minister for a dominant group. She said that a minister for men would be akin to having a minister for white people, heterosexuals or the upper class. Katherine Fletcher, former British Minister for Women, supported creating a minister for men or to have men's health in a ministerial portfolio, saying that it should help men's health and suicide, and to create male role models.

=== New Zealand ===
In 2016 David Seymour, leader of the ACT Party, expressed concern that there was a Minister for Women but not one for men. He criticised having a minister for certain demographics of sub-types of people, and instead suggested having a Minister for Gender. He said that if ministers must be created for certain demographics, there should also be one for men as men are "higher in suicide statistics, higher in imprisonment rates, higher in mental health statistics and lower in educational attainment". In 2023 far-right political activist Brian Tamaki has suggested appointing a Minister for Men.
