= James Hayward (politician) =

Australian disqualified politician (born 1969 or 1970)

James Dorrin Hayward

Member of the Western Australian Legislative Council for South West
- In office 22 May 2021 – 28 August 2023
- Succeeded by: Louise Kingston

Personal details
- Born: 1969 or 1970 (age 56–57) Derby, Western Australia
- Party: Independent (2021–2023); National (2012–2021)
- Spouse: Lee Hayward
- Children: 6
- Occupation: Television producer

James Dorrin Hayward is an Australian former politician. Elected as a Nationals member of the Western Australian Legislative Council at the 2021 Western Australian state election, he resigned from the party on 3 December 2021 after being charged with child sex offences, and was ultimately disqualified on 28 August 2023 after being convicted, although his conviction was later quashed. Hayward was the first person since John Marquis Hopkins in 1910 to be removed in this way.

From 19 April until 3 December 2021, he served as Shadow Minister for Local Government, Water and Regional Cities. In 2022, he served on a committee inquiring into cannabis and hemp.

On 28 August 2023, Hayward was found guilty of sexually abusing a young girl. His conviction for a crime with a maximum sentence of at least five years in jail meant he was automatically disqualified from parliament. On 16 October 2023, Hayward was sentenced to two years and nine months jail, needing to serve half of that before becoming eligible for parole. In October 2024, he was released on bail pending the determination of an appeal against his conviction. In January 2025, the Court of Appeal allowed his appeal and ordered a retrial, however, in March 2025, the Director of Public Prosecutions elected not to proceed with the prosecution.

== Personal life ==
Hayward was born in Derby, Western Australia to father Len and mother Lee Roser, and adopted at birth by Robert (Rob) John Hayward (a metalworker) and Dawn Maree Hayward (a hairdresser). He attended Riverton Primary School from 1975 until 1981, and Willetton Senior High School from 1982 until 1986, both in Perth.

On 1 October 2002, Hayward married Lee Michelle Hayward née Gouldham in Karratha. They have three sons, three daughters, and four grandchildren.

== Career ==
=== Television producer ===
He worked as a television journalist in the Pilbara region of Western Australia for GWN7, and for Channel 7 Perth, winning a Media Award in 2007.

In 2008 he established his own television production company, Fiery Productions, in the south west town of Bunbury, which went into liquidation in 2021 over an alleged A$440,000 tax debt, equivalent to A$469,000 in 2022.

=== Member of Bunbury City Council (2013–2021) ===
He joined the National Party of Australia (WA) in 2012. In 2013, he was elected to Bunbury City Council, serving until 2021. He served as state president of the National Party from 2015 to 2019, and as the federal vice president of the National Party of Australia.

=== Member of Western Australian Legislative Council (2021–2023) ===
At the 2021 Western Australian state election, Hayward was elected to the Western Australian Legislative Council as a member for South West.

He was the shadow minister for Local Government, Water, and Regional Cities.

On 2 December 2021, Western Australia Police charged Hayward with alleged child sexual abuse of an eight-year-old girl earlier in 2021. He was charged with three counts of indecent dealings with a child under 13 years, one count of procuring a child under 13 years to do an indecent act and one count of persistent sexual conduct. Later the same day, he was suspended by the National Party of Australia (WA). The following day, he resigned from the party. In February 2022, Hayward revealed he will not resign from parliament, saying that if he resigned, "it would send a message that any person in public office can be removed by simply making an untested allegation." In June 2022, prosecutors dropped the charge of persistent sexual conduct. He pleaded not guilty to the four remaining charges. However, on 28 August 2023, a jury found him guilty of directing an eight-year-old girl to indecently touch him on two occasions. As the offence has a maximum sentence over five years, he was automatically disqualified from being a member of parliament upon his conviction. This was the first use of the law since 1910.

== Criminal investigation and subsequent trial ==
A jury has convicted Hayward, a former MP, of two counts of indecently dealing with a young girl over a period of two years. The girl was aged between six and eight when the offences occurred between 2019 and 2021. The prosecution said the girl's family discovered her browsing pornography on her device in November 2021, which led to her disclosing the abuse by Hayward. The court heard that Hayward sent an email to his wife in which he appeared to confess to the allegations and threatened to kill himself, but he later retracted his statement and denied any wrongdoing. He also denied showing the girl how to access pornography on her iPad. The defence argued that the girl's testimony was unreliable and inconsistent, and that there was no physical evidence to support her claims. Hayward pleaded not guilty to all four charges against him, but the jury found him guilty of two after more than four hours of deliberation. On 16 October 2023, he was sentenced to two years and nine months jail, and had to serve half of that before becoming eligible for parole.

Hayward was granted a retrial in January 2025. He asserted that the overturning of his convictions would allow him to reclaim his seat in parliament. Police elected to discontinue the case out of concern for the complainant's welfare.
