= The Women's Party =

- Founder: Divvi De Vendre
- Founded: November 2018
- Registered: 20 February 2019
- Dissolved: 11 June 2021
- Ideology: Liberal feminism Gender equality
- Colours: Pink; White
- Slogan: Together we can achieve change!

Website
- thewomensparty.org.au

The Women's Party was an Australian political party which was registered on 20 February 2019. Its policies relate to women's rights, such as equal representation of women in parliament and equal pay. It also supports anti-corruption policies, the rights of First Nations and indigenous Australians, and action on climate change. It was founded by transgender woman Divvi de Vendre, who was the party's lead candidate for the Senate in the 2019 federal election. The party's constitution stipulated that all positions within the party executive were only to be held by women.

The party was de-registered by the Australian Electoral Commission on 11 June 2021.
