= Holmes à Court =

Holmes à Court is a surname which may refer to:

- The Barons Heytesbury, starting with the 2nd Baron
- William à Court-Holmes, 2nd Baron Heytesbury (1809–1891), British Member of Parliament who changed his last name to Holmes à Court in 1860
  - Herbert Edward Holmes à Court (1869–1934), British Royal Navy vice-admiral, grandson of the above
- Robert Holmes à Court (1937–1990), South African-born Australian businessman, corporate raider and Australia's first billionaire, great-great-grandson of William à Court-Holmes
- Janet Holmes à Court (born 1943), Australian businesswoman, wife of Robert Holmes à Court
  - Paul Holmes à Court (born 1967), Australian businessman, son of Robert and Janet Holmes à Court
  - Peter Holmes à Court (born 1968), Australian businessman, son of Robert and Janet Holmes à Court
  - Simon Holmes à Court (born 1972), Australian businessman and political activist, son of Robert and Janet Holmes à Court
