= Monique Ryan =

Australian politician and former paediatric neurologist

Monique Ryan MP
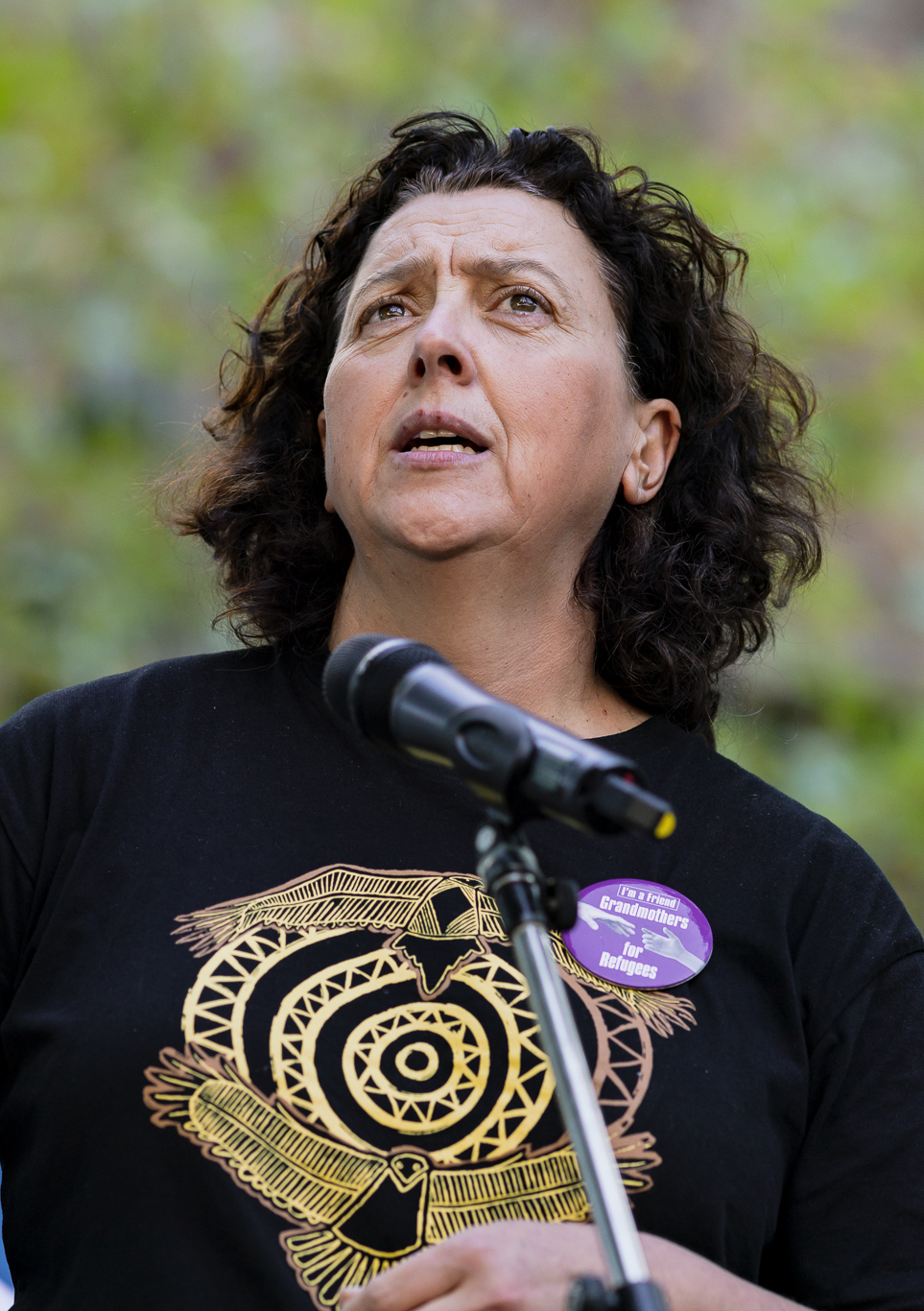
- Ryan in 2023

Member of the Australian Parliament for Kooyong
- Incumbent
- Assumed office 21 May 2022
- Preceded by: Josh Frydenberg

Personal details
- Born: Monique Marie Ryan; 20 January 1967 (age 59) Melbourne, Victoria, Australia
- Party: Independent
- Other political affiliations: Labor (2007–2010)
- Children: 3 (Note: One biological child and two step-children)
- Education: University of Melbourne; University of Sydney
- Occupation: Politician, former paediatric neurologist
- Known for: Independent member for Kooyong, former Director of Neurology at The Royal Children's Hospital Melbourne
- Website: https://www.moniqueryan.com.au/

Monique Marie Ryan (born 20 January 1967) is an Australian politician and former paediatric neurologist. She is currently the independent Member of Parliament for the Division of Kooyong, Victoria, having won the seat at the 2022 federal election and retaining it in 2025.

Ryan completed her medical qualifications in Melbourne and Sydney, and Boston, Massachusetts, United States. She became director of neurology at Melbourne's Royal Children's Hospital in 2014. During her medical career, Ryan has published more than 150 peer-reviewed publications and supervised several clinical trials for neurological diseases.

In the 2022 federal election, Ryan became an independent candidate for the Division of Kooyong; Climate 200 and a number of individual donors supported her. Ryan's campaign heavily focused on climate change, anti-corruption, and the Government of Australia's management of the COVID-19 pandemic. Ryan has been classified by the media as being a Teal independent. The campaigns of Ryan and her main opponent, incumbent Liberal member Josh Frydenberg, were estimated to have spent over A$2 million each. Ryan's campaign featured significant community involvement, with more than 1,500 volunteers canvassing the electorate and 2,000 individual donors. Ryan won Kooyong at the 2022 federal election with 52.9% of the after-preferences vote, and retained the seat at the 2025 federal election with a swing against her.

Since entering parliament, Ryan has advocated for a range of issues, and proposed a private member's bill to improve integrity in government. She has been particularly vocal on issues of climate change, health, and anti-corruption policy. Ryan has also been prominent in calling for reforms in the HECS system, and created a petition on the issue that gained more than 260,000 signatures. Her proposed changes were adopted by the Albanese government in May 2024.

== Early life ==
Monique Marie Ryan was born in Melbourne, Victoria, Australia, on 20 January 1967. She has a twin sister and is one of seven children born to Maurice and Marguerite Ryan. Her father was a telecommunications executive and her mother was a charity worker who served as CEO of the Christian Brothers Foundation, and founded Women for Women in Africa, a charity supporting the Kibera slum in Kenya.

Ryan grew up in the Melbourne suburbs Caulfield North, Toorak and Hawthorn. She attended Loreto Mandeville Hall, Toorak, graduating as dux in 1984.

== Medical career ==
Ryan studied medicine at the University of Melbourne and graduated in 1991. She then underwent paediatric training in Sydney and completed a neurology residency at the Children's Hospital Boston in Massachusetts, United States, and also completed a neurophysiology fellowship at the Lahey Clinic in the same US state. In 2015, she became director of neurology at the Royal Children's Hospital (RCH), Melbourne, where she supervised 45 people and had a research budget of A$3.5 million, and was appointed as head of the RCH's neuromuscular clinic and neuromuscular research unit.

Ryan has over 150 peer-reviewed publications and has overseen a number of clinical trials for neuromuscular diseases, including ones for Charcot–Marie–Tooth disease, Duchenne muscular dystrophy and spinal muscular atrophy. Her publications have over 10,000 citations and she has an H-index of 50, which is a measure of the impact of her research. She was joint editor of the textbook Neuromuscular Disorders of Infancy, Childhood, and Adolescence: A clinician's approach (2014).

Ryan was awarded prizes for her research in neurology by the US Child Neurology Society in 2000, the American Academy of Neurology in 2002, and the XIth International Congress on Neuromuscular Disorders in 2006. In 2019, Ryan was awarded an Australian Financial Review 100 Women of Influence Innovation Award for her impact in medical research.

In 2019 and 2023, Ryan was called as an expert witness to inquiries into the deaths of Kathleen Folbigg's children, where Ryan testified neurogenetic disorders may have been the cause of the death of Folbigg's son Patrick.

== Political career ==
=== 2022 election campaign ===
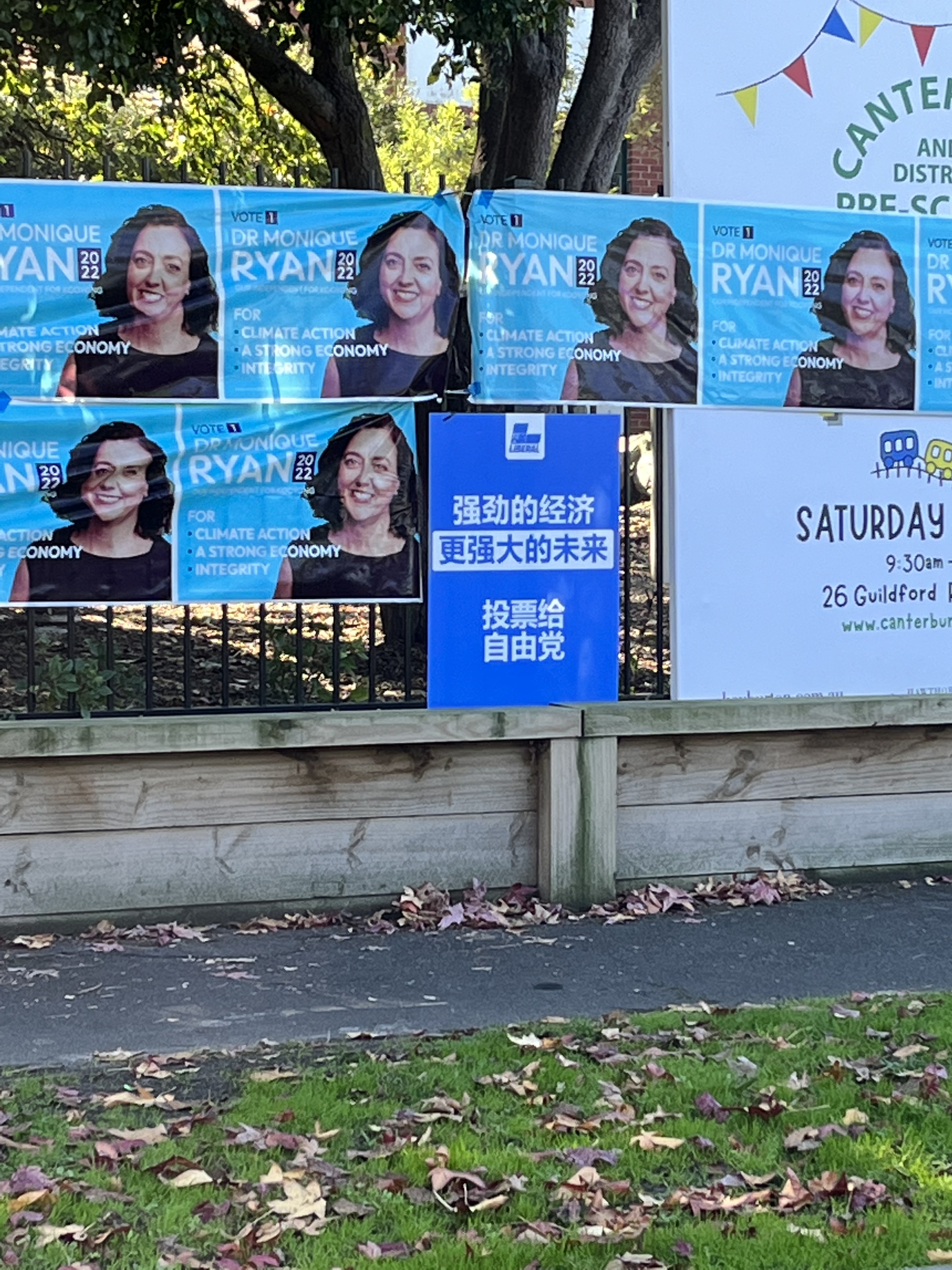
Posters for Ryan and a Liberal party sign at a polling place in Kooyong on election day 2022

In the lead-up to the 2022 federal election, Monique Ryan responded to an advertisement in The Age calling for an independent candidate in the Division of Kooyong to unseat the federal treasurer and deputy leader of the Liberal party, Josh Frydenberg, who had received an eight-percent swing against him at the previous election. Ryan had no previous political experience—whether in university, community or local council politics—and stated that she was motivated to stand for election due to "a rising sense of desperation" around climate policy, as well as the government's attitude towards women.

On 12 December 2021, Ryan launched her election campaign for Kooyong at Hawthorn Arts Centre. She was one of a number of centrist "teal independents" who campaigned to unseat moderate Liberal Party MPs on the basis of a lack of action on climate change among other policies. (Note: The classification of "teal independent" derives from Ryan's and other independent candidates' campaigns, referring to a political blend between Liberal Party blue and green policies.) Ryan had been a member of the Australian Labor Party (ALP) between 2007 and 2010, which led Frydenberg to characterise her as a "fake independent". Ryan has stated she had never attended any party meetings and had quit Labor in 2010 due to dissatisfaction with their policies regarding climate change.

Ryan campaigned primarily on policies relating to climate change and anti-corruption. The Morrison government consistently opposed a federal anti-corruption commission or federal version of New South Wales' Independent Commission Against Corruption (ICAC), which Prime Minister Morrison described as a "kangaroo court". Ryan and other teals campaigned on their support of a federal ICAC-like body and Ryan endorsed the ICAC model independent MP Helen Haines proposed.

Voices of Kooyong, an organisation established by former politics academic Ann Capling, backed Ryan's campaign, which was reported to have 1,500 volunteers and more than 2,000 donors as of April 2022. Volunteers from Ryan's campaign canvassed every household in the electorate. The volunteer manager of Ryan's campaign was Rob Baillieu, son of former Premier of Victoria Ted Baillieu. Ted had previously campaigned for Frydenberg.

Around 3,700 individual donors contributed $1.84 million to Ryan's campaign and Climate 200, a climate advocacy organisation which contributed $5.96 million combined to the campaigns of teal candidates, contributed $749,000. Between January and March 2022, Ryan's campaign spent $86,700 on advertisements on Facebook. Frydenberg's campaign spending $57,359 on competing advertising over the same period. In total, Ryan's campaign spent $2.12 million and Frydenberg's spent around $2 million.

At a function on 2 May 2022, Frydenberg stated that Ryan's mother-in-law had approached him in the street and said she would vote for him. Ryan initially stated that the anecdote was untrue but later stated that it was true and that drawing family members into the campaign was inappropriate. On 5 May, Ryan and Frydenberg participated in a televised debate hosted by Sky News in front of a live audience at Hawthorn Town Hall. During the debate, Ryan called Frydenberg the "Treasurer for New South Wales" (NSW), a criticism of the federal government's approach to the COVID-19 pandemic that was perceived to favour NSW over Victoria. By 6 May, Ryan's campaign said it had issued more than 3,000 corflute signs and posters, enough for 1:25 houses in Kooyong. In early May, the walls of a pub at Kew junction were painted with a mural depicting Ryan, but the painting was stopped on 13 May because the building's owner had not given permission.

On 19 May, the Australian Electoral Commission (AEC) announced that individuals isolating with COVID-19 would be unable to vote in person and that the date to apply for telephone voting had already passed. This ruling prevented around 100,000 people from voting. In response, Ryan announced she would be taking Special Minister of State Ben Morton to the Federal Court of Australia to argue that telephone voting should be allowed for all COVID-positive voters. Ryan crowdfunded to fund the court case and raised more than $73,000 by 9:30 pm that day. The case did not proceed, because on 20 May the AEC announced that telephone voting would be extended to all who required it.

When polls closed on the day of the election, 21 May, Ryan was initially convinced she had no chance of victory, thinking Frydenberg was "a bridge too far" to defeat. As the results were reported, however, Ryan's chances of winning continued to increase. Three hours later, Australian Broadcasting Corporation's (ABC) election expert Antony Green stated that Frydenberg would not get more than 43% of the two-candidate vote. At 10:30 pm, Ryan delivered a speech to her supporters, saying: "Kooyong, our climate has changed". Frydenberg stated he would not concede defeat because it was still "mathematically possible" for him to win. On 22 May, with around 71% of the vote counted, Ryan was projected to win with 54% of the two-candidate vote. On 23 May, Frydenberg telephoned Ryan to concede defeat. Ryan described the telephone call as "respectful" but stated in The Teal Revolution Frydenberg refused to say "congratulations" and told Ryan her campaign "was not really run in the right spirit". Frydenberg was the first treasurer to lose his seat since Ted Theodore at the 1931 federal election.

Ryan won the seat of Kooyong, receiving 52.9% of the two-candidate vote. Ryan said her first priority would be action on climate change.

In June, supporters of Ryan in Kooyong received letters containing threats and abuse in response to Ryan's election. Ryan reported these to the Australian Federal Police (AFP).

=== First term (2022–2025) ===
Ryan's election made her the 1230th member elected to the House of Representatives, the eighth member representing Kooyong, and the first woman to represent Kooyong.

Ryan gave her first speech to Parliament on 28 July 2022. In it, she called for strong action on climate change, the establishment of a national integrity commission, legislation to enforce truth in political advertising, transparency in political donations, and other measures to strengthen integrity in the political system.

After winning the seat of Kooyong at the 2022 election, Ryan hired Sally Rugg as chief of staff. Disagreements about Rugg's working hours and responsibilities arose. Further incidents, which Rugg alleged amounted to hostile conduct in the workplace, also arose. In January 2023, Rugg resigned as Ryan's chief of staff and a court application was lodged alleging a breach of Fair Work Australia's (FWA) general protections. Rugg stated she had been forced to work excessive hours and that Ryan had justified this by saying she wished to be prime minister one day. Ryan publicly disagreed with these statements and stated she was joking about becoming prime minister. After failures at mediation, the case was set to proceed to trial. Justice Debra Mortimer denied an injunction for reinstatement. Legal academics anticipated the case as potentially of precedent value for Australian employment law; Ryan argued her court case with Sally Rugg demonstrated the crossbench required more staff. Staffing numbers for the crossbench were reduced in June 2022. On 8 May 2023, the dispute was resolved when Rugg accepting a settlement of A$100,000 with no admission of fault and all parties paying their own costs.

In June 2023, Ryan stated her opposition to fracking projects in the Northern Territory (NT) and endorsed a letter written by paediatricians that opposed fracking in the Beetaloo Basin. In response to criticism from Ryan and other crossbench MPs, NT resource minister Natasha Fyles gave a speech at the National Press Club characterising critics of fracking projects as "teals and trolls". Ryan and independent senator David Pocock criticised the speech.

Since August 2022, Ryan has been a member of two parliamentary committees; the House of Representatives standing committee on Health, Aged Care and Sport, and the joint standing committee on the National Disability Insurance Scheme (NDIS).

In August 2023, it was reported Prime Minister Anthony Albanese's son had been granted access to the exclusive Qantas Chairman's Lounge, leading to public discussions of Qantas's influence on politicians. It was also reported the heads of several regulators overseeing Qantas and other airlines were also provided with complimentary access to the lounges. In September, Ryan and other MPs gave up their access to the exclusive area at Canberra Airport, citing concerns such access was a lobbying tool.

In August 2023, Ryan signed a complaint the Cancer Council of Western Australia (WA) submitted to the Alcoholic Beverages Advertising Code panel (ABAC). The complaint related to ABAC's approval of advertising for "Hard Solo", an alcoholic version of the Australian soft drink Solo. Following the complaint, ABAC found the code had been breached and Asahi Breweries renamed the product "Hard Rated".

Ryan has called for the release of Julian Assange, an Australian citizen who was being held in HM Prison Belmarsh in London, UK, while appealing a US extradition order to face charges there. In September 2023, Ryan travelled to Washington, D.C., as part of a cross-party parliamentary delegation, which also included Nationals MP Barnaby Joyce, to lobby US politicians for their government to cease its campaign to extradite Assange.

Stage three tax cuts, the final tranche of personal income-tax reforms legislated by the former Coalition government, were due to take effect in July 2024. In October 2023, Ryan, along with crossbenchers Senator David Pocock and MP Dai Le, stated she opposed the stage-three cuts which would mostly benefit middle-to high-income earners. Ryan stated cancelling the tax cuts would allow for the doubling of funding for rent assistance. In January 2024, in response to the government considering modifying the tax cuts, Ryan stated she welcomed changes being made and said the 37% tax bracket should be maintained. The changes made to stage three announced by the government included keeping the 37% tax bracket.

In October 2023, Ryan stated her opposition to an electric vehicle tax, such as the one that had been introduced in Victoria, as a distance-based charge to recoup lost government revenue from petrol excise. The High Court of Australia struck down Victoria's legislated tax as unconstitutional. Ryan said there should fair application of road-use charges to all vehicles.

Ryan supported the unsuccessful campaign to create an Indigenous Voice to Parliament, which was voted upon in the October 2023 referendum, and stated she was proud a majority (60.68%) of Kooyong residents voted Yes. During the campaign, Ryan criticised comments made by opposition leader Peter Dutton, who claimed there was a "skew" towards the Yes side in the counting of referendum votes.

On 13 October 2023, following Palestinian terrorist group Hamas's attack against Israel, Ryan attended a pro-Israel rally in Caulfield, Melbourne. On 17 October, Ryan voted in favour of a parliamentary resolution that condemned Hamas's attack. The Greens proposed an amendment to the resolution, adding a statement that said Parliament also condemned "war crimes perpetrated by the State of Israel, including the bombing of Palestinian civilians", which Ryan voted against. Fellow teal independents Kylea Tink and Sophie Scamps voted in favour of the amendment, which was not successful. The resolution passed with the support of the government, opposition, and several crossbenchers. On 3 November, Ryan called for a "humanitarian pause" in the conflict, describing the "human suffering in Gaza" as "intolerable". In response, the principal of a Jewish school in the electorate of Kooyong published an open letter criticising Ryan for not mentioning Israeli suffering in her statements.

In November 2023, Ryan called for a "mandatory compensation scheme" for passengers whose flights are cancelled without warning, and stated Australian airlines were behaving as a "mafia of the skies".

In November 2023, to address political lobbying in Australia, Ryan introduced a private member's bill entitled Lobbying (Improving Government Honesty and Trust) Bill 2023 to the House, and stated the bill came from a need to "clean up politics", saying: "our current lobbying rules are toothless and ineffective". The Human Rights Law Centre praised the bill and called it "the most ambitious proposal to regulate lobbying put before federal parliament in decades". As of May 2024, the bill has not been supported by the government or opposition.

In January 2024, Ryan, along with other teals, opposed the Victorian state government's plans for the construction of a wind farm in the port of Hastings over concerns of damage to wetlands. The federal environment minister Tanya Plibersek vetoed the project.

Ryan has been a prominent advocate for changes to the HECS-HELP scheme, the loan program for Australian higher education students. Ryan launched a petition on 14 March 2024, arguing for indexation of HECS to be changed to match the lower of the Consumer Price Index (CPI) or the Wage Price Index (WPI). The current indexation system resulted in HECS debts increasing by 7.1% in 2023, meaning that more than 1 million individuals had their HECS debt increase by more than their compulsory repayments. Ryan also stated that "The government got more money last year from our HECS debts than it did from its main fossil fuel tax". The petition gained more than 120,000 signatures within a week, and reached more than 260,000 signatures by 18 April 2024. Ryan's statements have been supported by fellow teal independents Zoe Daniel, Zali Steggall and Kylea Tink. In response, on 18 April, Prime Minister Anthony Albanese stated that the HECS system would be made "simpler and fairer" by measures in the May budget.

In November 2024, Ryan stated her support for lowering the voting age to 16. In July 2025, after the British government announced a plan to lower the voting age in the United Kingdom to 16, Ryan announced she would introduce a private member's bill to make that change in Australia.

In November 2024, Ryan co-authored a statement with other teal independents advocating for the federal government and opposition to both release 2035 emissions reduction targets prior to the 2025 Australian federal election. In December 2024, Ryan advocated for gambling company Sportsbet to remove advertising from the social media platform Snapchat after it was revealed that the advertising could be viewed by children under the age of 18.

=== 2025 election campaign ===
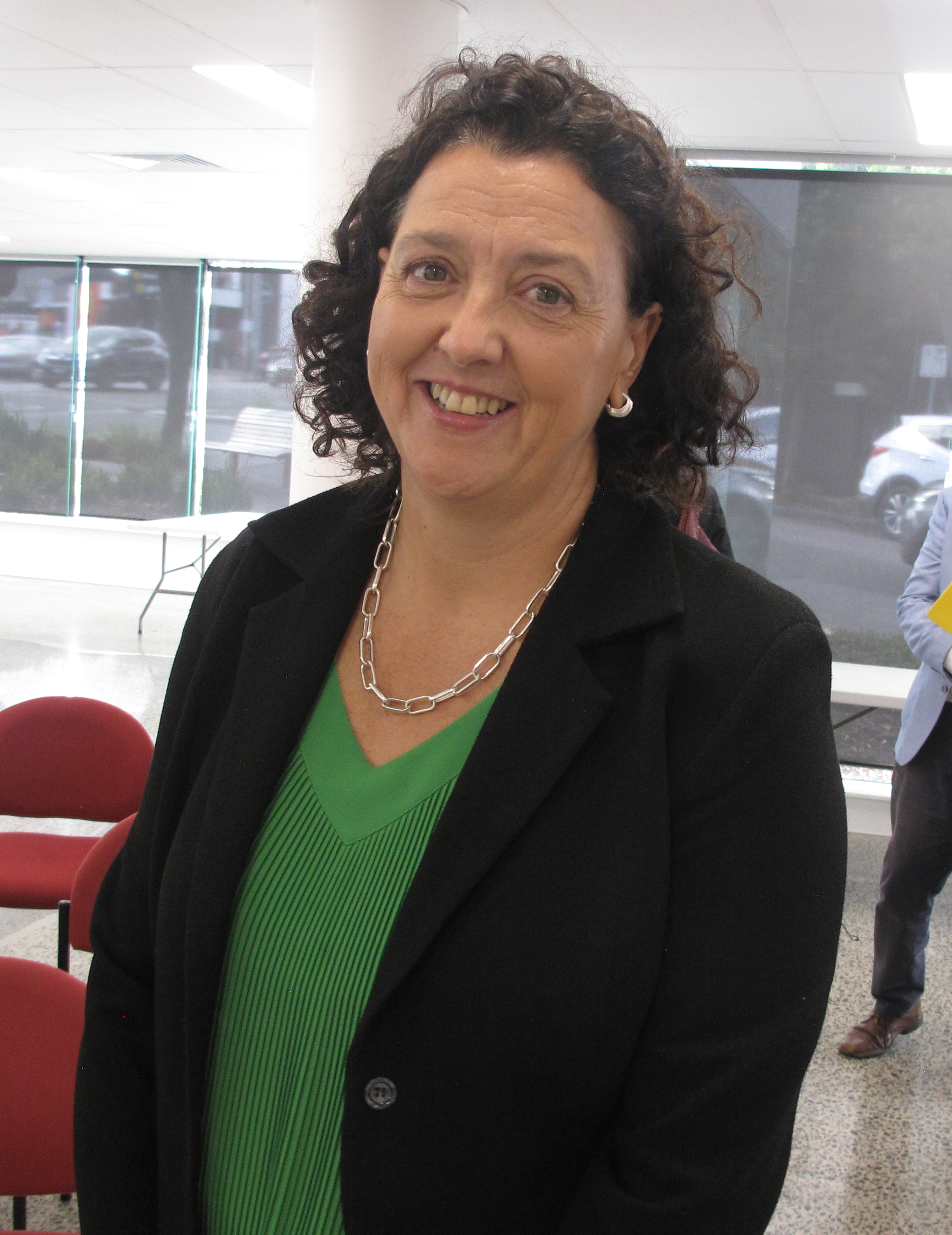
Ryan at the ballot paper draw for Kooyong in April 2025

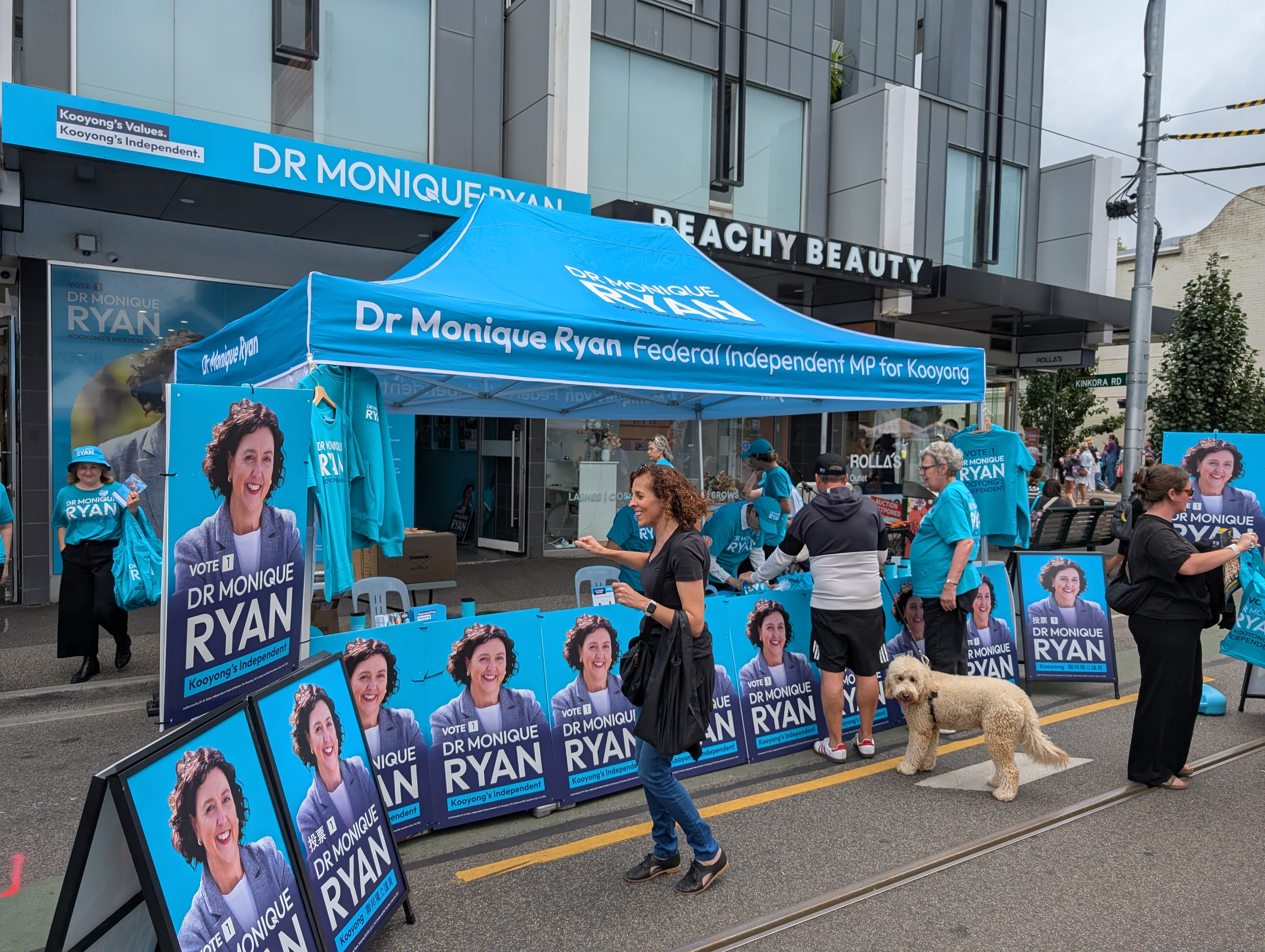
Stall for Monique Ryan during the 2025 Glenferrie Festival at Hawthorn in Melbourne

Ryan stood for re-election at the 2025 Australian federal election. Between 28 October 2024 and 25 January 2025, her campaign spent $71,000 on advertising on Meta Platforms. In February 2025, Ryan stated that, in the event of a hung parliament at the federal election, her first priority would be reforming the Petroleum Resources Rent Tax to increase taxation revenue from oil and gas companies.

In March 2025, Ryan and her husband, Peter Jordan, issued an apology after Jordan was filmed by the son of a property owner attempting to remove a corflute belonging to Liberal candidate Amelia Hamer. As a result of the attempted sign removal, the Liberal Party erected signs reading "Monique, please DO NOT take this sign" as part of campaigning for the Kooyong electorate. After a separate incident when video circulated on social media showed one of Ryan's own corflutes being torn down and buried, Ryan issued a statement condemning "violence and aggression" in political campaigning.

Ryan won Kooyong at the 2025 federal election. The result was close, with the ABC only making a definite prediction of the result on the 12th of May, 9 days after the election.

== Personal life ==
Ryan is a supporter of the Carlton Football Club. She lives in Hawthorn with her son, her two step-children and her husband Peter Jordan, a health products executive. She is a member of the Royal Australasian College of Physicians.

== Notes ==
Parliament of Australia
Preceded by Josh Frydenberg	Member for Kooyong; 2022–present	Incumbent
