= Vasse Felix =

Vineyard and winery in Western Australia

- Location: Caves Road, Margaret River WA 6284, Australia
- Coordinates: 33°49′21″S 115°02′15″E
- Wine region: Margaret River
- Founded: 1967
- First vintage: 1971
- Varietals: Cabernet Sauvignon, Chardonnay, Merlot, Sauvignon blanc, Semillon, Shiraz
- Distribution: International
- Tasting: Open to public
- Website: Vasse Felix

Vasse Felix was the first vineyard and winery to be established in the Margaret River wine region of Western Australia. Founded in Wilyabrup in 1967 by Dr Tom Cullity, it is recognised as a pioneer of the region, and also features an acclaimed restaurant in Cowaramup. The owner and CEO is Paul Holmes à Court.

== History ==
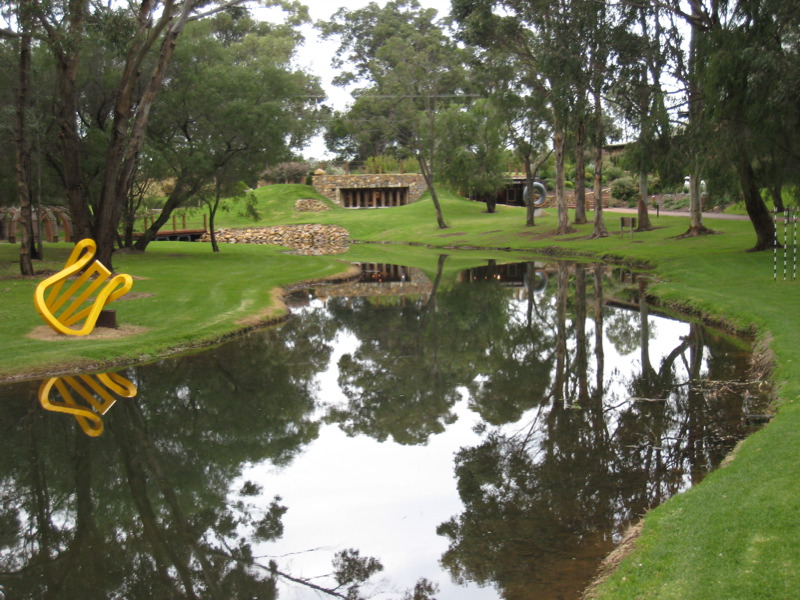
Grounds at the Vasse Felix cellar door

The first vintage at Vasse Felix was disappointing, with the harvest being substantially reduced by attacks from silver eyes, and by the after-effects of bunch rot. However, by the 1970s the winery was winning medals at the Perth Royal Show.

== Restaurant ==
The restaurant at Vasse Felix was awarded two stars, and won the award for the Regional Restaurant of the Year, in The West Australian Good Food Guide 2013.

== See also ==
- Australian wine
- Heytesbury Pty Ltd
- Janet Holmes à Court
- Robert Holmes à Court
- List of wineries in Western Australia
- Western Australian wine
