= Climate 200 =

Australian climate advocacy group

Climate 200 Pty Ltd
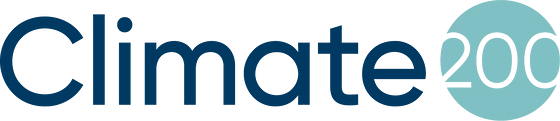
- Industry: Political Funding
- Founded: 2019; 7 years ago
- Founder: Simon Holmes à Court
- Headquarters: Potts Point, New South Wales
- Key people: Simon Holmes à Court (Convenor)
- Products: Teal independents
- Website: www.climate200.com.au

Climate 200 Pty Ltd is an Australian company that provides political funding. It describes itself as a "community crowdfunding initiative" that supports community-backed independents to stand for election to advance climate policy, reduce greenhouse gas emissions by the country and limit climate change in Australia. Its convener told the ABC that the backed candidates "have a shared philosophy on climate change, integrity and gender equity."

The candidates are colloquially grouped by the media as the teal independents, reflecting the campaign colour chosen by some (but not all) of its candidates. The colour teal has been explained as indicating their policies are "a shade between blue Liberal and green".

== Background ==
The convenor of Climate 200 is Simon Holmes à Court, who was formerly a part of Josh Frydenberg's fundraising group, the Kooyong 200.

With a background in renewable energy and climate policy, Holmes à Court wrote an article in 2018 that was critical of the Coalition's efforts to keep coal fired power stations open. Holmes à Court was thrown out of Frydenberg's group within 24 hours after the article was released, but this gave him an insight into major fundraising for campaigns.

== Election campaigns ==
=== 2019 federal election ===
In the lead-up to the 2019 federal election the group raised over $500,000.

=== 2022 federal election ===
For the 2022 federal election, the group provided funding for twenty-three candidates who were either independent or running for minor parties, including most of the teal independents. Some of these candidates were also endorsed by Voices groups. They also endorsed additional "values-aligned candidates" without funding them.

The focus of the group was to get more people on the crossbench who aimed to strengthen climate policy and the functioning of parliament.

The group announced a number of high-profile former MPs to join their advisory panel from across the political spectrum.

In October 2021 the group announced that they had raised $2 million in 6 weeks. By December 2021 that had grown to $6.5 million from 6,750 donors. The group also conducted polling in some of the seats that they planned to support.

==== Funded candidates ====
Candidate	State	Electorate	Successful?	Incumbent Party
David Pocock	ACT	ACT (Senate)	Yes	Various
Kim Rubenstein	ACT	ACT (Senate)	No	Various
Jo Dyer	SA	Boothby	No	Liberal
Nicolette Boele	NSW	Bradfield	Yes	Liberal
Kate Hook	NSW	Calare	No	National
Claire Ferres Miles	Vic	Casey	No	Liberal
Andrew Wilkie	Tas	Clark	Yes	Independent
Caz Heise	NSW	Cowper	No	National
Kate Chaney	WA	Curtin	Yes	Liberal
Despi O'Connor	Vic	Flinders	No	Liberal
Zoe Daniel	Vic	Goldstein	Yes	Liberal
Liz Habermann	SA	Grey	No	Liberal
Georgia Steele	NSW	Hughes	No	United Australia
Helen Haines	Vic	Indi	Yes	Independent
Monique Ryan	Vic	Kooyong	Yes	Liberal
Sophie Scamps	NSW	Mackellar	Yes	Liberal
Rebekha Sharkie	SA	Mayo	Yes	Centre Alliance
Kylea Tink	NSW	North Sydney	Yes	Liberal
Hanabeth Luke	NSW	Page	No	National
Leanne Minshull	Tas	Tasmania (Senate)	No	Various
Alex Dyson	Vic	Wannon	No	Liberal
Zali Steggall	NSW	Warringah	Yes	Independent
Allegra Spender	NSW	Wentworth	Yes	Liberal

=== 2022 Victorian state election ===
Climate 200 announced their support for a number of independent candidates in the Victorian state election. The candidates were Kate Lardner for Mornington, Melissa Lowe for Hawthorn, Sophie Torney for Kew, and Nomi Kaltmann for Caulfield. No independents won seats at the election, with all incumbent independents being defeated.

Legislative Assembly
Candidate	District	Incumbent party	% 1st pref.	% 2CP	Elected	Colours
Sarah Fenton	Bellarine	Labor	4.58%	—N/a	No	
Jacqui Hawkins	Benambra	Liberal	31.70%	49.06%	No	
Felicity Frederico	Brighton	Liberal	9.10%	—N/a	No	
Nomi Kaltmann	Caulfield	Liberal	6.50%	—N/a	No	
Melissa Lowe	Hawthorn	Labor	19.98%	—N/a	No	
Sophie Torney	Kew	Liberal	21.10%	—N/a	No	
Kate Lardner	Mornington	Liberal	22.42%	49.30%	No	
Clarke Martin	Sandringham	Liberal	6.91%	—N/a	No	

=== 2023 NSW state election ===
Legislative Assembly
Candidate	Division	Incumbent party	% 1st pref.	% 2CP	Elected	Colours	Climate 200 Pty Ltd & Holmes à Court Donations
Victoria Davidson	Lane Cove	Liberal	20.38%	—N/a	No		$9,891.50
Joeline Hackman	Manly	Liberal	27.19%	45.15%	No		$9,850.00
Helen Conway	North Shore	Liberal	21.85%	44.31%	No		$9,891.50
Jacqui Scruby	Pittwater	Liberal	35.86%	49.34%	No		$9,886.00
Karen Freyer	Vaucluse	Liberal	17.06%	37.12%	No		$0.00
Judith Hannan	Wollondilly	Liberal	25.94%	51.52%	Yes		$3,285.70
Alex Greenwich	Sydney	Independent	41.1%	65.6%	Yes		$3,000.00

In total Climate 200 Pty Ltd together with Simon and Karina Holmes a Court directly donated $45,804.70 to six candidates between 1 October 2022 and 25 March 2023. The total individual donations to Climate 200 Pty Ltd during the campaign were $166,665.59 of which $49,727.28 originated from individuals not enrolled to vote in New South Wales.

Legislative Council
Candidate	% 1st pref.	Elected	Colours
Elizabeth Farrelly	1.32%	No	

=== 2024 NSW state by-elections ===
Legislative Assembly
Candidate	Division	Incumbent party	% 1st pref.	% 2CP	Elected	Colours	Climate 200 Pty Ltd & Holmes à Court Donations
Jacqui Scruby	Pittwater	Liberal	54.17%	55.94%	Yes		

=== 2025 Australian Federal Election ===
Candidate	District	Incumbent party	% 1st pref.	% 2CP	Elected
Kate Chaney	Curtin	Liberal	32.23%	53.27%	Yes
Zoe Daniel	Goldstein	Liberal	30.72%	49.92%	No
Helen Haines	Indi	Independent	42.29%	58.64%	Yes
Monique Ryan	Kooyong	Independent	33.91%	50.67%	Yes
Sophie Scamps	Mackellar	Independent	37.98%	55.66%	Yes
Rebekha Sharkie	Mayo	Centre Alliance	29.92%	64.89%	Yes
Allegra Spender	Wentworth	Independent	36.48%	58.34%	Yes
Andrew Wilkie	Clark	Independent	48.88%	70.38%	Yes
Nicole Arrowsmith	Moncrieff	Liberal	7.62%	—N/a	No
Nathan Barton	Moore	Liberal	6.33%	—N/a	No
Nicolette Boele	Bradfield	Independent	27.01%	50.01%	Yes
Tina Brown	Berowra	Liberal	11.37%	—N/a	No
Sue Chapman	Forrest	Liberal	18.31%	—N/a	No
Verity Cooper	Sturt	Liberal	7.18%	—N/a	No
Kate Dezarnaulds	Gilmore	Labor	7.54%	—N/a	No
Alex Dyson	Wannon	Liberal	31.38%	46.73%	No
Claire Ferres Miles	Casey	Liberal	10.48%	—N/a	No
Peter George	Franklin	Labor	21.69%	42.22%	No
Caz Heise	Cowper	National	29.35%	47.46%	No
Suzie Holt	Groom	Liberal	17.14%	44.33%	No
Kate Hook	Calare	National	15.77%	—N/a	No
Kate Hulett	Fremantle	Labor	23.01%	49.31%	No
Keryn Jones	Fisher	Liberal	16.29%	—N/a	No
Anita Kuss	Grey	Liberal	17.54%	—N/a	No
Deb Leonard	Monash	Independent	17.10%	—N/a	No
Jeremy Miller	Lyne	National	15.49%	—N/a	No
Michelle Milthorpe	Farrer	Liberal	19.96%	43.81%	No
Erchana Murray-Bartlett	McPherson	Liberal	13.75%	—N/a	No
Jess Ness	Deakin	Liberal	7.15%	—N/a	No
Jessie Price	Bean	Labor	26.41%	49.66%	No
Jenny Rolfe	Riverina	National	6.53%	—N/a	No
Phil Scott	Solomon	Labor	12.47%	—N/a	No
Ben Smith	Flinders	Liberal	21.24%	47.71%	No
Ellie Smith	Dickson	Liberal	12.19%	—N/a	No
Francine Wiig	Fairfax	Liberal	11.78%	—N/a	No

== Reception ==
Climate 200 is a fund that distributes resources to its chosen candidates; however, there are some who claim that it is a political party. Holmes à Court rejected this notion in a February 2022 National Press Club address. He says that the money that the candidates receive have no strings attached and Climate 200 has no control over them. In September 2021, Senator Andrew Bragg wrote to the Australian Electoral Commission to ask them to ensure that group were fulfilling all the requirements for disclosures for political donations. In December 2021, the federal parliament passed a law to require "significant third parties" to register if they spend more than $250,000 on electoral expenditure in a year.

Some news organisations have expressed a view that Climate 200 is a vehicle for people opposed to the Liberal Party to defeat it in seats that are unwinnable by the Australian Labor Party. The Australian Financial Review in February 2022 described Climate 200 as "an anti-Liberal Party fundraising vehicle controlled by renewable-energy advocate Simon Holmes à Court [which is running] Independents funded by Mr Holmes à Court ... in about 20 Liberal-held seats...". Antony Green, ABC chief elections analyst, stated in April 2022 that these independents are running in "winnable seats ... but these are seats that Labor would never win, the Greens wouldn't win — these are safe Liberal seats."

There were 22 candidates supported by Climate 200 at the 2022 Australian Federal Election. 15 contested Coalition incumbents, 3 were independents who held previously Liberal held seats, and 2 were senate candidates in the ACT where they contested the seat then held by Zed Seselja. Wilkie and Leanne Minshull, an independent Senate candidate in Tasmania, were the only two that not directly contesting Coalition held seats. Independents with similar platforms to those endorsed by Climate 200 who ran in Labor held seats, such as Sarina Kilham in Grayndler held by Anthony Albanese, Leader of the Labor Party, were not endorsed. Jo Dyer, the supported candidate in Boothby, a Liberal seat indicated she would support a Labor minority government, and Dr Monique Ryan, the supported candidate in Kooyong, then held by Josh Frydenberg, is a former Labor member.

== People involved ==
=== Advisors ===
- Julia Banks
- John Hewson
- Barry Jones
- Meg Lees
- Rob Oakeshott
- Tony Windsor
- Jim Middleton

=== Notable donors ===
- Simon Holmes à Court
- Mike Cannon-Brookes
- Naomi Milgrom and family
