= Voices movement (Australia) =

Independent political advocacy groups

The Voices for or Voices of groups are a series of political community engagement groups in Australia. The first group to be established was Voices for Indi in 2012. Voices of Warringah was established in the lead up to the 2019 Australian Federal Election. Following that election, groups were established in Wentworth, North Sydney and Mackellar in NSW. Other groups followed in other states including Kooyong and Goldstein.

Some of these groups endorsed candidates to run in federal elections. Others have remained non-partisan.

Some of the candidates endorsed by Voices groups have received funding from the Climate 200 fund established by energy investor Simon Holmes à Court.

== History ==
Australia has had a number of independents who have successfully won a seat in parliament.

Voices groups are locally organised groups channelling growing dissatisfaction with traditional political parties that are not representative of their electorates. The first "Voices" group was founded in the electorate of Indi in 2012 around an identified need for greater democratic engagement at the community level.

Some of the groups actively seek and endorse a community independent candidate. Some groups are focused on participatory democracy, so are strictly non-partisan and are not seeking or endorsing a candidate.

There is also a group seeking to register as a political party, the Independent Voices for the Senate, in order to endorse Voices candidates so they will be "above the line" on the Senate ballot papers.

== Indi ==
Voices for Indi was established in 2012 following the incumbent Liberal MP Sophie Mirabella rejecting a proposal for greater democratic participation, stating "the people of Indi aren't interested in politics".

The first meeting of what would become Voices for Indi was organised by Cathy McGowan on 16 June 2012 at the Wangaratta Library, who was motivated by a lack of investment in local services and a desire to create change in the electorate of Indi. After a number of meetings at the Wangaratta Library, the group was split between two methods for political engagement — either standing their own independent candidate and running an election campaign, or simply engaging in the political process by voting for a preferred candidate. Ultimately, another discussion at Wangaratta's Sydney Hotel resolved to run a campaign for an independent, rooted in "civility rather than combat". Incorporated association Voice 4 Indi (which would later change its name to Voices for Indi in 2014) was established on 24 October 2012, with the aims of developing a structure to support a candidate "in line with the Vision for Indi". The Vision for Indi established by the group included "an active 21st century democracy" rooted in civic engagement and respect, as well as "leadership with vision".

The organisation established informal forms of participatory democracy by setting up "kitchen table conversations" and using campaign offices as community "hubs" for political discussion. The kitchen table conversations model was initially designed by the Victorian Women's Trust, established during the late 1990s amidst unease over actions taken by the Kennett government.

When the group presented Mirabella with the report, they felt ignored. At that point their view was the only way to get their needs heard in parliament would be to make the electorate marginal and to force the Liberal party to preferences in order to win the seat rather than winning on primary votes, as they had in every election since the formation of the Liberal party in 1949 when the Nationals were not running. In order to achieve that goal they decided to endorse an independent. The group endorsed Cathy McGowan as their candidate. At the 2013 federal election McGowan received a very favourable preference flow and won the seat by 439 votes. She also won in 2016.

The Indi group does not run a candidate, rather they endorse a candidate and provide the candidate with a volunteer base and advice and expertise when needed.

The organisation inspired the establishment of numerous Voices groups which would follow, including Voices of Warringah in 2018, who later endorsed the independent Zali Steggall for the Division of Warringah. Zali Steggall defeated the incumbent member of Warringah and ex-Prime Minister Tony Abbott in the 2019 Australian federal election.

McGowan chose not to contest the 2019 election. Voices for Indi endorsed Helen Haines, who ultimately won the election. It represents the first time in Australia that two independents were elected consecutively.

Helen Haines went on to win again in 2022 and again in 2025.

Voices for Indi was used as inspiration and a template for several community independent female candidates running in the 2022 and 2025 federal elections.

== Warringah ==
In the lead-up to the 2019 elections, two groups were formed in the division of Warringah, whose MP was former prime minister, Tony Abbott. One was Voices of Warringah which modelled itself on Indi, the other being Vote Tony Out which targeted Abbott directly, claiming that his views on issues such as climate made him a poor fit to represent the electorate.

Voices of Warringah endorsed former Olympic skiing medallist Zali Steggall. Steggall won the election with over 57% of the two candidate vote. She was re-elected in 2022 with a 1.8% swing in her favour. She was re-elected again in 2025.

== Wentworth ==
Following the 2019 election, Voices of Wentworth was established in February 2020 by a group of professional local women concerned primarily with the Morrison government’s lack of evidence-based climate action, integrity in politics and record on supporting women.

The group was inspired by the impact of the grassroots Voices groups in Warringah and Indi.

In July 2020 Voices of Wentworth began hosting community events on topics of concern to local voters, holding kitchen table conversations organising “Democracy Walks” at Bondi Beach and a ‘By 2030 I’d like to see’ campaign to hear first-hand what members of the community cared about. The initial goal was to build a platform for stronger engagement between voters and the local Liberal Party federal representative.

By November 2020, Voices of Wentworth was recognised as an established group holding regular well attended town halls on issues despite the challenges presented by the Covid pandemic.

Voices of Wentworth went on to compile a “Community Engagement Report” containing the findings of their community engagement initiatives.

In October 2021, Voices of Wentworth representative Delia Burrage appeared on Nine News stating that voters wanted to see a “concrete, measurable plan for how we are going to reduce emissions”.

Voices of Wentworth continues its work as a non-partisan organisation supporting effective engagement between voters and the incumbent MP. The group is active in three key areas: listening to what people care about, informing local people about topics of national importance, and advocating for change on policies locals.

Wentworth Independents

In 2021, due to the non-partisan status of Voices of Wentworth, a separate group of volunteers was established by Blair Palese and Maria Atkinson, two early contributors to Voices of Wentworth Town Hall events. “Wentworth Independents” separately commenced the search for a suitable candidate to challenge the incumbent Dave Sharma at the upcoming 2022 election.

In November 2021, Allegra Spender announced her candidacy for the federal seat of Wentworth which she went on to win. She subsequently won again at the 2025 federal election with an increased majority where she also won the primary vote.

== Mackellar ==
Voices for Mackellar was established in 2020.

== North Sydney ==
Voices of North Sydney was created by Rod Simpson, Andrea Wilson, and Felicity Coonan in April 2020, amidst the COVID-19 lockdowns. The group held hundreds of kitchen table conversations to investigate issues of importance to the local community, but were disappointed when they presented their findings to North Sydney's Liberal MP, Trent Zimmerman. In reference to the meeting with Zimmerman, Wilson stated that "it became very clear there would be no deviation from the party line". Voices of North Sydney ultimately decided in early 2021 against standing their own candidate for the federal election, leading to the creation of North Sydney's Independent, which aimed to choose a candidate to unseat Zimmerman.

North Sydney's Independent held a public launch in June of 2021, announcing at the Crows Nest Hotel that they intended to run a candidate at the 2022 federal election, and placed an advertisement in the North Shore Times calling for prospective candidates. Kylea Tink, a charity CEO, was one of the candidates put forward to North Sydney's Independent, and was interviewed by committee members of the group in "walking meetings" around local parks, due to the limitations of Sydney's ongoing COVID-19 lockdowns. Tink announced her candidacy for North Sydney on 18 September, naming action on climate change as her primary issue.

At the 2022 federal election, Kylea Tink was elected as a community independent to represent the seat.

The Guardian reported in June 2022 that North Sydney's Independent had identified the state seats of Lane Cove, North Shore, and Willoughby, all held by Liberal MPs, as potential targets for independent candidates. Later reports indicated that the search for candidates had narrowed to Lane Cove and North Shore. Denise Shrivell, a co-convenor of North Sydney's Independent, stated to supporters in November 2022 that, given the group expected Larissa Penn to run in Willoughby as an independent, North Sydney's Independent had elected to focus only on Lane Cove and North Shore. North Sydney's Independent candidates for the 2023 state election were announced in December 2022. Victoria Davidson, a podiatrist, was selected in Lane Cove, and Helen Conway, a corporate lawyer, was selected in North Shore. Their campaigns were noted for a focus on planning and development concerns. Both Davidson and Conway polled above 20 percent of the primary vote, but neither candidate was successful in their bids for election.

The electorate of North Sydney was abolished following the redistribution in 2024.

== Bradfield ==
Voices of Bradfield was established in 2020. Nicolette Boele was the selected candidate in 2022, but lost the election to the sitting Liberal MP.

She recontested in 2025, and was declared the new MP by a margin of just 26 votes, after a full recount.

== Goldstein ==
Voices of Goldstein is a grassroots community organisation in the Division of Goldstein, a federal electorate in Victoria, Australia, named after suffragist and women’s rights campaigner Vida Goldstein.

Founded in January 2021 by six local residents, the group emerged to address community frustration with political inaction on climate change, gender equality, and integrity in governance.

Inspired by Vida Goldstein’s legacy as one of the first women to stand for federal parliament in the early 20th century, Voices of Goldstein sought to challenge the electorate’s longstanding Liberal Party dominance by supporting a community-backed independent candidate. In early 2021, Voices of Goldstein received an endorsement from Ian Macphee, former Liberal MP for Goldstein (1974–1990) and a minister in the Fraser Government, who supported the idea of an independent candidate. On 27 November 2021, Voices of Goldstein announced Zoe Daniel, a former journalist, as its community-backed independent candidate for the 2022 Australian federal election with over 600 people attending the event at the Sandringham Rotunda. Ian Macphee later formally endorsed Daniel.

== Kooyong ==
Voices of Kooyong was established in 2020.

== 2022 federal election ==
Following the 2019 election in which Voices-endorsed independents won two seats, many other communities started their own Voices groups. These extend across urban, suburban, and peri-urban electorates in metropolitan areas, as well as provincial and rural electorates in regional areas, in all of Australia's states and territories except the Northern Territory.

In early 2021, Cathy McGowan headed a conference for community minded independents to give them support and encouragement to run for elected office. The conference had representatives from 78 of the 151 divisions of the Australian parliament, and counted 28 Voices groups at the time of the conference. Initially the conference aimed for 50 attendees, but over 300 attended. In May 2022 there were 56 Voices groups in Australia, up from 39 in In mid December 2021.

The Voices groups have engendered some confusion in the Australian media which has traditionally framed political discourse in Australia as a struggle between the Australian Labor Party (ALP) versus the long-time Coalition of the Liberal Party, National Party and Liberal National Party (in Queensland). The Australian's Paul Kelly called the candidates "anti-coalition independents" and reported on National's leader Barnaby Joyce's warning to not vote independent.

The various Voices groups are independent of one another but often identify similar issues of concern within their electorates, which are most often focused on addressing issues with government integrity and political corruption and addressing environmental issues, particularly climate change. Most of the Voices groups are focused on participatory democracy and community engagement, with some eventually endorsing independent candidates.

Reflecting the values and issues that Voices groups are identifying in their electorates, many of the independent candidates who have been endorsed by Voices groups have policy positions which align with traditional Liberal policies. A number of the candidates indicated that they had recently voted for the Liberal party. Voices of Wentworth endorsed candidate, Allegra Spender, was from a high profile Liberal family.

Nine candidates endorsed by Voices or similar groups won their seat at the election. They had all also been endorsed by Climate 200.

=== Endorsements ===
Former Prime Minister Malcolm Turnbull said of the movement "Indi and Warringah are not 'special cases' but templates for further change if the Coalition cannot deliver on climate." Turnbull has also called the growth of these groups as a "very very healthy development" that allows people to vote for candidates who align with their views.

Ian Macphee who was a minister in the Fraser government and an MP for Goldstein endorsed the Voices of Goldstein and the broader movement, saying "I believe grassroots activity is imperative and can be done by supporting good independent candidates." The candidate in Goldstein, Zoe Daniel, was also endorsed by Cathy McGowan.

Former leader of the Liberal Party, John Hewson said of the movement "taking the vote for granted has been a mistake from both parties for quite some time and you're starting to see protest movements gain momentum . . . over time, you're going to see it reflected in the ballot box." Former Labor MP, Barry Jones and former Democrats leader, Meg Lees joined Hewson on the board of Climate 200, a fund aiming to financially support independent candidates.

The movement has also received endorsements from former members of parliament, Kerryn Phelps, Tony Windsor and Rob Oakeshott.

=== Opposition ===
Opposition to the movement generally comes from the Liberal Party which is sensitive to the threat of moderate independents to its socially progressive inner-city electorates, and the National Party which is seeing its support being eroded in regional electorates.

The Liberal party has voiced opposition to Voices of Goldstein on the grounds that their support and money is coming from supporters of the Greens and the Extinction Rebellion. These claims are countered by the group who claim that they also have many disaffected Liberals as members as well as members of Labor and Greens.

Liberal MP Dave Sharma, who was defeated by Allegra Spender accused Voices candidates of being a single issue candidate. However, Julia Banks, who was an MP for the Liberals before moving to the cross-bench, contends that she was most effective when she became an independent.

==== Funding ====
In September 2021, Senator Andrew Bragg wrote to the Australian Electoral Commission to ask them to ensure that the groups were fulfilling all the requirements for disclosures for political donations. This is despite the fact that the groups were not political parties, and at that stage had not endorsed any candidates.

In December, the federal parliament passed a law to require “significant third parties” to register if they spend more than $250,000 on electoral expenditure in a year. Many of the Voices groups did not fit this criterion.

In November 2021, it was reported that Voices of Goldstein in Melbourne had received a significant donation from David Rothfield, a former member of the Greens, who together with his brother donated half a million dollars of his father's estate to environmental causes as well as to the ALP and Greens.

=== Voices groups and endorsed candidates at the 2022 Australian federal election ===
Group	Electorate	State	Candidate endorsed	Incumbent member	Successful candidate	Source
YES Voices	Aston	Vic		Liberal	Liberal	
Voices for Aston	Aston	Vic		Liberal	Liberal	
ProACT	ACT (Senate)	ACT	David Pocock	Various	David Pocock (and others)	
Voices of Bennelong	Bennelong	NSW		Liberal	Labor	
Voices of Berowra	Berowra	NSW		Liberal	Liberal	
Voices of Boothby	Boothby	SA	Jo Dyer	Liberal	Labor	
Voices of Bradfield	Bradfield	NSW	Nicolette Boele	Liberal	Liberal	
Voices 4 Calare	Calare	NSW	Kate Hook	National	National	
Voices for Casey	Casey	Vic	Claire Ferres Miles	Liberal	Liberal	
YES Voices	Casey	Vic		Liberal	Liberal	
Voices of Chisholm	Chisholm	Vic	Sarah Newman	Liberal	Labor	
Voices for Cooper	Cooper	Vic		Labor		
Voices of Corangamite	Corangamite	Vic	Alex Marshall	Labor	Labor	
Voices 4 Cowper	Cowper	NSW	Carolyn Heise	National	National	
Voices for Wollongong	Cunningham	NSW		Labor		
Curtin Independent	Curtin	WA	Kate Chaney	Liberal	Kate Chaney	
YES Voices	Deakin	Vic		Liberal		
Voices of Durack	Durack	WA	None	Liberal		
Dickson Decides	Dickson	Qld	not yet	Liberal		
Voices of Dickson	Dickson	Qld	not yet	Liberal		
We Are Fadden	Fadden	Qld	None	Liberal	Liberal	
Voices4GC	Fadden	Qld	None	Liberal	Liberal	
Fairfax Matters	Fairfax	Qld		Liberal		
Voices of Mornington Peninsula	Flinders	Vic	Dr Sarah Russell	Liberal	Liberal	
Voices for Forrest	Forrest	WA		Liberal		
Voices4GC	Forde	Qld	None	Liberal	Liberal	
Voices of Goldstein	Goldstein	Vic	Zoe Daniel	Liberal	Zoe Daniel	
Voices of Groom	Groom	Qld	Suzie Holt	Liberal		
Voices of Hinkler	Hinkler	Qld		National		
We Are Hughes	Hughes	NSW	Linda Seymour	UAP	Liberal	
Hughes Deserves Better	Hughes	NSW	Georgia Steele	UAP	Liberal	
Voices of Hume	Hume	NSW	Penny Ackery	Liberal	Liberal	
Vote Angus Out	Hume	NSW	Penny Ackery	Liberal	Liberal	
Voices for The Hunter	Hunter	NSW	None	Labor		
Voices for Indi	Indi	Vic	Helen Haines	Helen Haines	Helen Haines	
Voices of Kooyong	Kooyong	Vic	Monique Ryan	Liberal	Monique Ryan	
Kooyong Independents	Kooyong	Vic	Monique Ryan	Liberal	Monique Ryan	
Voices 4 Lyne	Lyne	NSW		National		
Mackellar Rising	Mackellar	NSW	Sophie Scamps	Liberal	Sophie Scamps	
Voices of Mackellar	Mackellar	NSW	None	Liberal	Sophie Scamps	
Voices for Mallee	Mallee	Vic	None	National		
McPherson Matters	McPherson	Qld	None	Liberal		
Voters of Menzies	Menzies	Vic		Liberal		
Voices for Monash	Monash	Vic	Deb Leonard	Liberal	Liberal	
Voices of Moncrieff	Moncrieff	Qld	None	Liberal	Liberal	
Moore Deserves More	Moore	WA		Liberal	Liberal	
Voices for Moore	Moore	WA		Liberal	Liberal	
What Matters? New England Electorate	New England	NSW		National		
Voices for Nicholls	Nicholls	Vic	None	National		
Voices of North Sydney	North Sydney	NSW	Kylea Tink	Liberal	Kylea Tink	
North Sydney's Independent	North Sydney	NSW	Kylea Tink	Liberal	Kylea Tink	
Voices of Pearce	Pearce	WA		Liberal		
Voices4Riverina	Riverina	NSW		National		
Voices of Ryan	Ryan	Qld		Liberal		
Voices of Tasmania	Tasmania	Tas		Various	Various	
Independent Voices for the Senate	Victoria (Senate)	Vic	Susan Benedyka	Various	Various	
Voices of Wannon	Wannon	Vic	Alex Dyson	Liberal	Liberal	
Voices of Warringah	Warringah	NSW	Zali Steggall	Zali Steggall	Zali Steggall	
Wentworth Independents	Wentworth	NSW	Allegra Spender	Liberal	Allegra Spender	
Voices of Wentworth	Wentworth	NSW	Allegra Spender	Liberal	Allegra Spender	
Voices of Wide Bay	Wide Bay	Qld		National		
Voices4GC	Wright	Qld	None	Liberal	Liberal	
Voices for the Senate	Australia			Various		

=== Voices groups arising since the 2022 Australian federal election ===
Group	Electorate	State	Incumbent member/party	Candidate endorsed	Source
Voices of Bean	Bean	ACT	Labor	Jessie Price	
Voices of Belconnen and Gungahlin	Fenner & Canberra	ACT	Labor		
Voices of Belconnen and Gungahlin	Ginninderra & Yerrabi (territory)	ACT	various		
Voices for Canberra	Canberra	ACT	Labor		
Voices of Deakin	Deakin	Vic	Liberal	Jess Ness	
Voices of Farrer	Farrer	NSW	Liberal	Michelle Milthorpe	
Voices of Fisher	Fisher	Qld	Liberal National	Keryn Jones	
Voices of Franklin	Franklin	TAS	Labor	Peter George	
Voices of Macquarie	Macquarie	NSW	Labor		
Voices of Moore	Moore	WA	Liberal	Nathan Barton	
Nedlands Independent	Nedlands (state)	WA	Labor	Rosmarie de Vries	
Voices of Top End	Lingiari	NT	Labor		
McPherson Matters	McPherson	Qld	Liberal National		
Voices of O’Connor	O'Connor	WA	Liberal		
Voices of Top End	Solomon	NT	Labor		
Independent for Sturt	Sturt	SA	Liberal	Verity Cooper	

== See also ==
- Teal independents
- Liberals for Forests
