= Teal independents =

Grouping of independent politicians in Australia

Teal independents, also known as community independents, or simply teals, are various centrist, independent or non-party politicians in Australian politics who have been grouped together for convenience of discussion by the Australian media and who have found electoral success contesting seats with a history of representatives coming from the Liberal Party of Australia. They have been characterised as strongly advocating for increased action to mitigate climate change by reducing greenhouse gas emissions along with improved political integrity and accountability. They also generally share socially liberal outlooks, including on issues such as LGBT rights, while still retaining conservative fiscal policies similar to the Liberals. While formally unaffiliated, a study has found that the teals often vote in a bloc and show significant cohesion.

The colour teal has been interpreted by some journalists as a blend of the blue of the Liberal Party and the green of green politics, and was a dominant feature of campaign branding used by high-profile independent candidates Zali Steggall, Allegra Spender, Monique Ryan, Kate Chaney, Zoe Daniel and Sophie Scamps; however, not all candidates used the colour. The movement can be understood as ideological split from the Liberal Party – with inner city voters moving away from the party.

The most significant impact of candidates usually described in this grouping came in the 2022 Australian federal election, with 7 seats won in the House of Representatives and one Senate seat. The teals mostly consolidated their position at the 2025 Australian federal election, with Nicolette Boele winning the Sydney seat of Bradfield and Zoe Daniel losing the seat of Goldstein in Melbourne.

On 25 June 2026, Steggall announced she was forming the Community Strong Australia party with fellow teal MP Spender.

== History ==
By 2018, support for the traditional major groupings, the Australian Labor Party and the Liberal–National Coalition, was wavering. At the 2016 election, just over a quarter of voters were voting for minor parties or independents for the Senate. The Grattan Institute published a report in March 2018 labelled 'A Crisis of Trust', detailing the rise of an 'anyone but them' vote against the major parties and the rise of minor parties as a consequence, particularly in regional areas. Critically, over 70% of Australians surveyed believed that Australia's system of government needed reform. MP for Curtin Kate Chaney said of the 2018 Liberal Party leadership spill and election: "I certainly think that when the Liberal Party knocked back Julie Bishop and chose Scott Morrison instead, it was a sliding-doors moment for the Australian Liberal Party", "a lot of women looked at that point and thought, 'this does not look like a party that represents me'", which helped create the teals movement.

=== 2013–2019 ===
==== Cathy McGowan in Indi electorate, Victoria ====
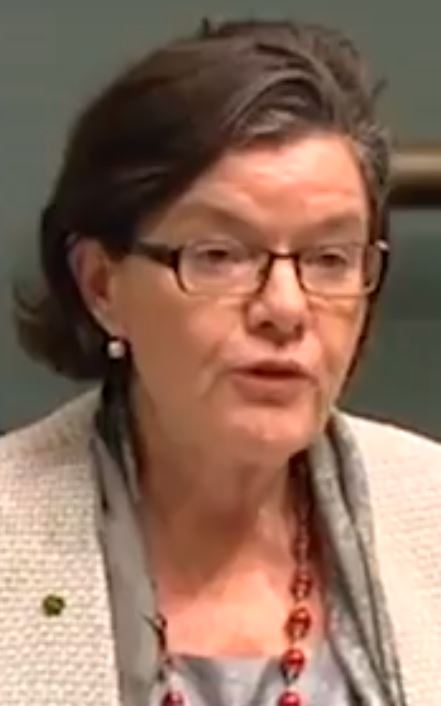
Cathy McGowan

The Community Independents Project was originated by constituents of the Division of Indi in rural Victoria, who prepared a report about issues in their electorate. Then-MP Sophie Mirabella of the Liberal Party was largely dismissive of the report, causing the group Voices for Indi to be formed, with the aim of making Indi a marginal seat and forcing Mirabella to preferences. Voices for Indi, which chose not to become a party to avoid excluding large portions of the electorate who held loyalties to political parties, endorsed Cathy McGowan. Initially, Voices for Indi was reluctant to go public and instead chose to meet discreetly at Wangaratta Library, as Mirabella had a history of making personal attacks against opponents, with then-retiring independent MP Tony Windsor describing Mirabella as "the nastiest—I reckon if you put it to a vote to all politicians, she'd come up No. 1." Windsor's comment, prompted by a question on Insiders regarding what he would miss the most about federal politics, went viral both online and in local newspapers. McGowan ran a strong grassroots campaign, managing to raise $117,000 AUD and mobilising members of the local community for campaigning. Mirabella also caused controversy when she took credit for multiple health-related projects in Indi, where she had done minimal campaigning, instead leaving it to the local community. McGowan won the seat at the 2013 election. McGowan retired from parliament at the 2019 federal election and Voices for Indi campaigned for Helen Haines to succeed McGowan. Haines was successful in her election, becoming the first independent in Australian history to succeed another independent.

==== Kerryn Phelps in Wentworth electorate, NSW ====
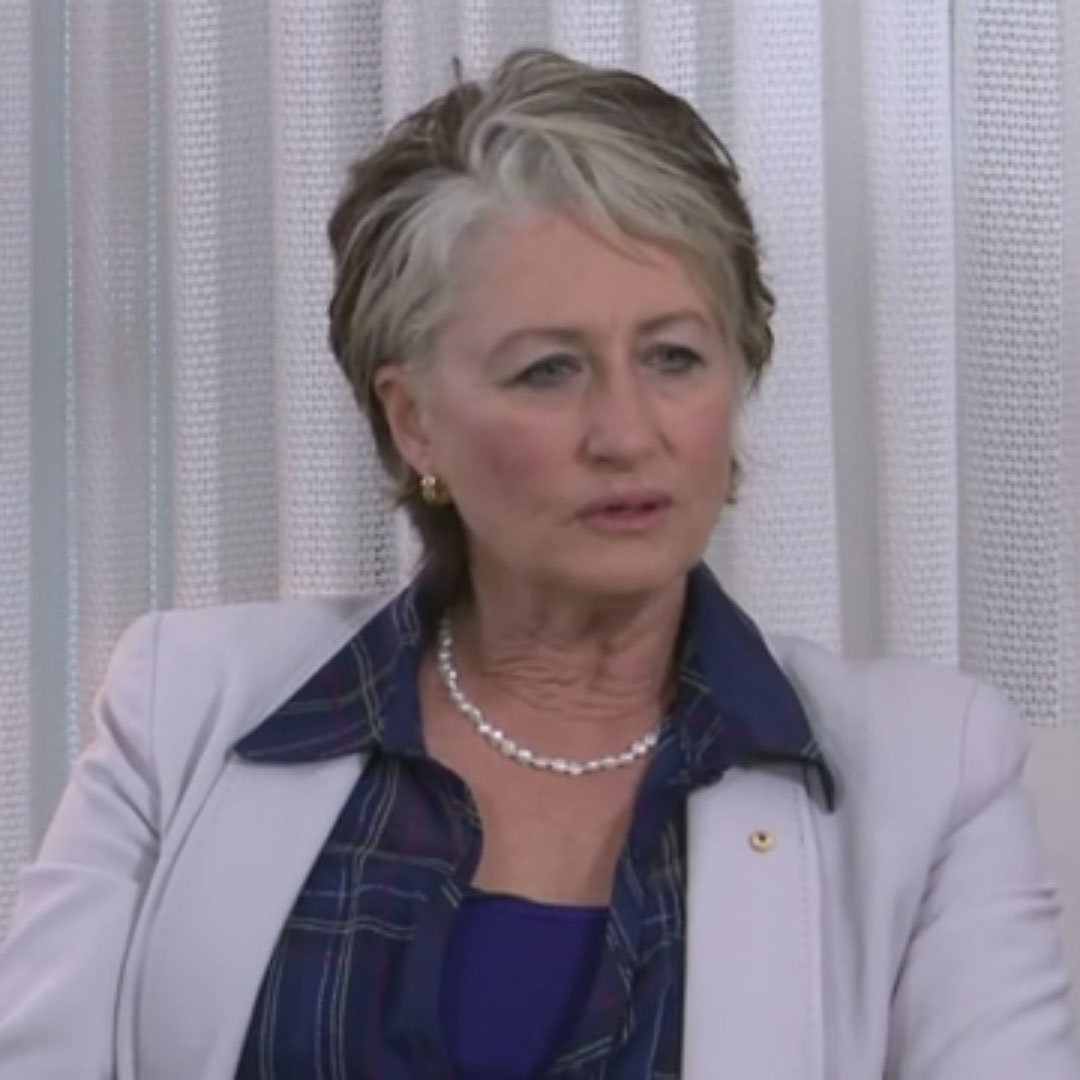
Kerryn Phelps

Prior to the 2018 Wentworth by-election, Kerryn Phelps, a councillor of the City of Sydney, had been considering a run at the lord mayorality of Sydney, including discussing campaign design and management, when she decided to run for Wentworth. Phelps ran a grassroots campaign similar to McGowan's. Phelps won the seat of Wentworth on a 19% swing towards her, succeeding former prime minister Malcolm Turnbull and forcing Turnbull's successor as prime minister, Scott Morrison, into a minority government. The result was attributed to the dumping of Turnbull, a popular local member and moderate, by the party's conservative wing, as prime minister in favour of Morrison. Climate change was also cited as a key factor in Phelps's win, which conservatives in the Liberal Party had pushed to weaken emission reduction laws. Similar to McGowan, Phelps benefitted from large numbers of campaign volunteers. The result forced the Morrison government into a minority government, requiring the support of a member of the crossbench to pass legislation in the House of Representatives. At the 2019 election, seven months later, Phelps lost the seat to the Liberals' Dave Sharma, who had narrowly lost to Phelps at the 2018 by-election. Simon Holmes à Court, founder of fundraising group Climate 200, expressed anger that he did not invest in Phelps' campaign sufficiently, stating that Climate 200 was "kicking ourselves afterwards that we had under-invested in Kerryn's campaign," and that he believed that a few thousand dollars in additional funding would have resulted in Phelps retaining the seat.

==== Zali Steggall in Warringah electorate, NSW ====
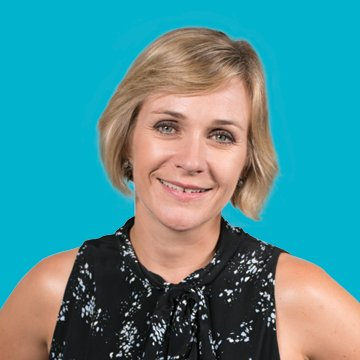
Zali Steggall

Before the 2019 election, a series of community groups, most prominently Vote Tony Out and Voices of Warringah, formed with the intention to eject former prime minister Tony Abbott out of his safe seat of Warringah. Abbott had generated controversy for his climate denialism. He had once called the science behind climate change "crap". Abbott has also been a vocal opponent of same-sex marriage, at odds with his electorate, where over 75% of voters in Warringah supported same-sex marriage at the Australian Marriage Law Postal Survey, leading to criticism that he was 'out of touch with his electorate'. They began a search for a pro-climate, centrist candidate similar to Phelps. Journalists Peter FitzSimons and Lisa Wilkinson, Warringah locals, were approached to run for the seat, however both declined. Scientist and environmentalist Tim Flannery had also discussed running for Warringah with community groups, however he never ran.

On New Year's Day, 2019, former alpine skier, bronze medallist at the 1998 Winter Olympics, and lawyer, Zali Steggall, appeared in a 'Vote Tony Out' T-shirt, created by the community group of the same name. Three weeks later, Steggall announced she was running for Warringah, at a rally organised by Vote Tony Out and Voices of Warringah. At the rally, Steggall outlined her key campaign promises, including climate change action, human rights issues, mental health and domestic violence. Steggall benefitted from the backing of several community groups, including Vote Tony Out and Voices of Warringah, as well as the prominent activist group GetUp!, who had vowed to remove Abbott from his seat. During the campaign, Abbott struggled to garner funding, being over $50,000 AUD short of his $150,000 funding goal just two weeks out from the election, a large number of pro-Steggall campaign posters, billboards and clothing, and a grassroots campaign with strong funding sources. Steggall was able to garner over $1.1 million in donations, including Climate 200, bankrolled by Holmes à Court and Atlassian co-founder Mike Cannon-Brookes. Steggall was successful in unseating Abbott, stating that Warringah had "voted for the future".

=== Post-2020 ===
The 2021 March 4 Justice has been cited as a key catalyst of the teal movement, organised as a result of the 2021 sexual misconduct allegations, most prominently Brittany Higgins' allegation of being raped at Parliament House, and Morrison government frontbencher Christian Porter's confirmation that he had been named in a historic rape allegation. Morrison received criticism for his apparent need to talk to his wife, Jenny, before responding to the protests. He generated further controversy after refusing, along with his Minister for Women, Marise Payne, to publicly speak to the 4 March Justice protesters, who had surrounded Parliament House. Morrison had lost significant support among women in the leadup to the 2022 election; an Australian Financial Review Ipsos poll had shown that one in three women were voting for Morrison. Social commentator and key campaigner for the teal movement, Jane Caro, stated that she "absolutely [drew] a direct line from the March 4 Justice to the success of the teals."

Climate 200 was revived ahead of the 2022 election by Holmes à Court, to "try to level the playing field for independents once more". Holmes à Court had veteran campaigner Anthony Reid and Byron Fay, a Paris Agreement negotiator who would later become CEO of Climate 200, run a review into Climate 200's first iteration, for the 2019 election, before re-creating it.

Influenced by the corresponding groups in Indi and Warringah, a number of Voices groups organised before the 2022 election, around issues relating to the environment and political integrity.

==== Electoral gains at 2022 federal election ====
At the 2022 federal election, teal independents defeated six sitting Liberal MPs; Allegra Spender in Wentworth, Kylea Tink in North Sydney, Zoe Daniel in Goldstein, Monique Ryan in Kooyong, Kate Chaney in Curtin, and Sophie Scamps in Mackellar. In addition, Zali Steggall, Rebekha Sharkie and Helen Haines were re-elected. Another ten teal lower house candidates were unsuccessful. In the Senate, David Pocock was elected for the ACT, while two others were not.

Margot Saville has stated that the term "teals" was coined by the media in reference to the six independents in 2022 who defeated high-profile Liberal MPs in formerly safe seats. Saville has also noted a policy difference between the six independents, owing in part to differing state policies on the COVID-19 pandemic, arguing that teals in New South Wales (governed by Liberal Premier Gladys Berejiklian) tended to be more conservative, while teals in Victoria and Western Australia (governed by Labor Premiers Daniel Andrews and Mark McGowan) tended to be more progressive.

==== State election endeavours ====
Voices groups and Climate 200 stood candidates in a number of seats at the 2022 Victorian election, however none won and only two reached a two-candidate-preferred vote.

In the New South Wales 2022 Willoughby state by-election, Larissa Penn who is not a teal candidate, and who had already run in 2019, gained 29.66% (or 46.70% in TCP). Independent Jacqui Scruby picked up the electoral district of Pittwater at a a by-election in 2024.

==== 2025 federal election ====
All incumbent teal independents won their seats except for Zoe Daniel, who lost to the previous MP, Tim Wilson, in the seat of Goldstein. Nicolette Boele also entered parliament after winning the Division of Bradfield. Kylea Tink retired from parliament at this election as her division of North Sydney was abolished in a redistribution.

== Structure ==
Teal independents are generally female candidates challenging Liberal Party incumbent MPs. Ten candidates for the House of Representatives and one candidate for the Senate described as teal independents were elected in 2022, of whom seven were elected for the first time.

Most teal independent candidates have received the support of fundraising group Climate 200, a political funding company led by Simon Holmes à Court. Founded shortly before the 2019 election, Climate 200 gave A$437,000 to 12 independents at the 2019 election, deriving from 35 donors, including Holmes à Court and Cannon-Brookes. At the 2022 federal election, Climate 200 donated A$5.96 million.

Teal independents have been categorised in the media by financial and administrative associations with Climate 200. They are generally unaffiliated to a political party, except Rebekha Sharkie (Centre Alliance, first elected in 2016) and some candidates from The Local Party. Senate candidates David Pocock and Kim Rubenstein also formed political parties for ballot purposes.

In addition to financial support from fundraising organisations such as Climate 200, candidates raised significant amounts of money directly through their personal fundraising arms. The campaigns of Allegra Spender and Monique Ryan both spent more than A$2.12 million. Daniel, Scamps, and Tink's campaigns all spent more than A$1 million.

=== Colour ===
At the 2019 election and subsequently at the 2022 election, a number of the high-profile candidates in Melbourne, Sydney and Perth used teal colours in their campaign, including Zali Steggall, Allegra Spender, Monique Ryan, Kate Chaney, Zoe Daniel and Sophie Scamps. This led to many using this colour to describe the whole movement by calling them the "teal independents" and calling the independent victories on election night a "teal wave" and "teal bath".

Fiona Patten, a crossbencher in the Victorian Legislative Council representing the Reason Party, used the colour teal in her campaign materials in 2018.

Cathy McGowan's Voices for Indi adopted the colour orange, while her successor Helen Haines continued to use it. Likewise, Rebekha Sharkie has used orange since 2016, in line with her Centre Alliance party, previously known as Nick Xenophon Team.

Other candidates associated with teal independents did not use teal, such as successful candidate Kylea Tink (pink).

The selection of the colour teal, a mix of blue and green, alludes to both the Liberal (blue) electorates they run in, and "green" policies.

=== Policies ===
The teal independents have been described as varying from centre-left to centre-right in political orientation, with Kate Chaney and Allegra Spender both descending from former Liberal ministers, and Monique Ryan being a former member of the centre-left Labor Party. Others, such as Zoe Daniel and Helen Haines, have been described as centrist. Generally, teal independents have been described as having progressive social policies, with a focus on climate change, anti-corruption policies and gender equality, while still retaining conservative economics similar to those of the Liberals. Some, such as David Pocock, focus on environmentalism, however others, such as Spender, emphasise economic policy.

In the 2023 Australian Indigenous Voice referendum, teal independents were key campaigners for the Yes campaign, competing in a friendly competition to see who could achieve the highest Yes vote in their electorate. Although the referendum was decisively defeated with 60% of voters voting No, all seats held by teal independents, bar Haines' regional seat of Indi, voted Yes.

Pat Leslie of ANU regards there as being a split in voting patterns between the 2022 teal independents and earlier established independents such as Andrew Wilkie and Rebecca Sharkie. Voting records show that in general the teal independents are more likely to vote with the Greens or Labor than the Coalition, except for Allegra Spender who voted with the Coalition 39% of the time, and Kate Chaney, who voted with the Coalition 36% of the time (equal to Labor).

== Reception ==
Political law professor Graeme Orr describes the movement as a "nascent political movement", sharing resources and strategies across seats, and with similar policy focuses on climate change, government integrity and gender equality.

A number of former politicians on the advisory council of Climate 200 endorsed the teal independents, including John Hewson, Rob Oakeshott, Tony Windsor and Meg Lees. Turnbull, whose former seat of Wentworth was won by Spender, encouraged moderate Liberals to consider voting for the teal independents. Others endorsed specific candidates, such as former Fraser government minister, Ian Macphee, who endorsed Zoe Daniel. In one overall supportive editorial, The Age found that the teal independents "have often struggled to articulate policies crucial issues to Australia, including its relationship with China, the mounting debt bill, tax reform and cost-of-living pressures".

Due to the impact and significance of the teal independents, "teal" was announced as "word of the year" by the Australian National Dictionary Centre. The teals, as well as Pocock and Haines, were shortlisted for the Emerging Political Leader of the Year 2022 by the McKinnon Prize, which Haines won.

=== Criticism and opposition ===
Because many teal independents contested the 2022 election in seats that were generally considered to be Liberal Party strongholds, multiple incumbent and former Liberal politicians were highly critical of the movement in the months prior: Christopher Pyne accused the teal independents of deliberately seeking to consign the Liberal Party to long-term opposition by targeting moderate centrist voters; Josh Frydenberg and Tim Wilson, who were both directly opposed by teal independent candidates, criticised the movement's open association with Climate 200 and called them "fake independents" and "so-called independents"; and Morrison argued that sending teal independents to the federal parliament would have a negative impact on Australia's political stability. Former Prime Minister John Howard criticized the teal independents, calling them "anti-Liberal groupies" and stating that they are "...posing as independents".

Independent MP Dai Le, along with Mayor of Fairfield Frank Carbone have formed the Dai Le and Frank Carbone Network, which is explicitly against the teal independents.

== Impact ==
=== In Australian politics ===
The Teal independents had most success winning traditionally Liberal seats in metropolitan areas showing an urban–rural political divide. In November 2022, the word "teal" was chosen by Macquarie Dictionary as its Word of the Year.

=== International politics ===
In England, the local party Independents for Dorset was inspired by the localism of the teal independents.

== See also ==
- Australian Democrats
- Blue wall (British politics)
- Condorcet winner criterion
- Environmental movement in Australia
- Environmentalists for Nuclear Energy Australia (2007–2010)
- Green liberalism
- Independents for Canberra
- Liberals for Forests (2001–2008)
- Malcolm Turnbull
- Teal Deal, a hypothetical New Zealand Green–National alliance in the mid 2000s
- Voices groups in Australia

== Notes ==
1.Despite being supported by Climate 200, Hannan has distanced herself from the label "teal".
