= Mount Sanford Station =

Pastoral lease and cattle station in Northern Territory

Coordinates: 17°00′12″S 130°32′07″E

Location in Northern Territory

Mount Sanford Station is a pastoral lease located approximately 500 kilometres (311 mi) south of Katherine, Northern Territory, Australia.

The property occupies an area of 2,497 square kilometres (964 sq mi) and is stocked with 23,000 head of cattle. It is owned by the Heytesbury cattle company and was managed in 2017 by Brent and Kelsey Stevenson, who took over in 2013.

It is composed primarily of undulating country with open black soil and patches of rock, with areas of swampy soil to the west, soil ridges to the south, and gorges and springs to the east.

In 2001 the property was managed by Paul and Jane Stone, who also had around 100 horses broken-in on the station each year for all the Heytesbury properties.

In 2017 the higher than usual rainfall wet season caused flood and erosion damage on the station, meaning mustering started later than usual. The previous three seasons had been relatively dry.

== See also ==
- List of ranches and stations
