= Janet Holmes à Court =

Australian businesswoman

Janet Holmes à Court AC
- Born: Janet Lee Ranford; November 29, 1943 (age 82); Perth, Western Australia
- Education: Perth Modern School; University of Western Australia
- Spouses: Robert Holmes à Court (m. 1966; died 1990) Gilbert George (m. 2018)
- Children: 4, including Peter Holmes à Court, Paul Holmes à Court and Simon Holmes à Court

Janet Holmes à Court, AC, HonFAHA, HonFAIB (born Janet Lee Ranford on 29 November 1943 in Perth, Western Australia) is an Australian businesswoman and philanthropist. She was the Chairperson of one of Australia's largest private companies, Heytesbury Pty Ltd, having turned around its fortunes after the death of her husband Robert Holmes à Court in 1990. She retained full ownership of the Heytesbury Group of companies until 2008 when her son, Paul Holmes à Court, assumed ownership.

== Life and career ==
Holmes à Court attended Perth Modern School and the University of Western Australia, where she graduated with a Bachelor of Science degree majoring in organic chemistry and a Diploma of Education in 1965. She then worked as a science teacher before marrying her husband in 1966 and having four children with him.

She currently lives in Perth. As her children left home, she developed interests in medical research, the arts and various charitable organisations.

After the death of her husband, she took over management of Heytesbury Pty Ltd, which was considerably in debt, rescuing and expanding it. The company operates cattle stations in remote Western Australia and has interests in vineyards, wine-making and engineering contracting.

Holmes à Court has one of the largest private art collections in Australia, with more than 3500 works and a value of $37 million in 2008. She owns the Holmes à Court Gallery with locations at the Vasse Felix winery in Cowaramup and in West Perth, displaying works from the Janet Holmes à Court Collection as well as other exhibitions in both venues.

As well as her business activities, Holmes à Court has been an active participant in progressive social issues, such as an advocate for the Australian Republican Movement at the 1998 constitutional convention, the Patron of Private Giving at the West Australian Symphony Orchestra, chair of the Art Gallery of Western Australia and deputy chairperson of the Chamber of Arts and Culture WA. From 1986 to 2022, she was the chair of the Australian Children's Television Foundation. She has also served on the board of the Reserve Bank of Australia and is an Honorary Fellow of the Australian Institute of Building. She was Pro-Chancellor of the University of Western Australia from 1990 to 1994, and a Senate member of both Murdoch University and the University of Western Australia.

In April 2018, Holmes à Court married businessman Gilbert George.

== Honours and awards ==
She was appointed Officer of the Order of Australia (AO) in 1995 and promoted to a Companion of the Order (AC) on Australia Day 2007 for service to business, particularly as a leader in the construction, wine and cattle industries, to the advancement of Western Australia's musical and theatre culture, to the visual arts, and to the community. In 2001, she was awarded the Centenary Medal for her service to the arts as Chair of the West Australian Symphony Orchestra and Black Swan Theatre Company. The National Trust of Australia has included her on its list of 100 Australian Living Treasures.

Her other honours and awards include:

- United Kingdom Veuve Clicquot Business Woman of the Year, 1995
- Institute of Engineers Medal, The Institute of Engineers Australia, 1997
- Inducted into the Leading Business Entrepreneurs of the World (USA), 1997
- International Business Council of Western Australia Business Award, 1998
- Victorian Honour Roll of Women, 2001
- AbaF Richard Pratt Business Leadership Award, 2003
- Lifetime Commitment Award, WA State Arts Sponsorship Scheme Awards, 2003
- Champion Award for the Year of the Built Environment (Western Australia), State Steering Committee, 2004
- WA Gold Medal Award, Australian Institute of Company Directors, 2007
- Companion of Engineers Australia, The Institute of Engineers Australia, 2007
- United Way Philanthropist of the Year Award, 2008
- The Woodrow Wilson Corporate Citizenship Award, 2009
- Inducted into the International Women's Day WA Women's Hall of Fame, 2011
- Elected Honorary Fellow of the Australian Academy of the Humanities, 2011
- Australian Achievement in Architecture National President's Prize, 2011
- Champion of Entrepreneurship Award, Ernst & Young Entrepreneur of the Year Awards, 2012
- John Shaw Medal, 2014

She holds a number of honorary doctorates including:

- Doctor of the University, Central Queensland University, 1994
- Doctor of the University, Murdoch University, 1997
- Doctor of Letters, University of Western Australia, 1997
- Doctor of Business, University of Ballarat, 2007
- Doctor of Business, Charles Sturt University, 2008
- Doctor of Arts, Edith Cowan University, 2011
