= Jack Palladino =

American private investigator (1944–2021)

- Born: John Arthur Palladino; July 9, 1944; Boston, Massachusetts, U.S.
- Died: February 1, 2021 (aged 76); San Francisco, California, U.S.
- Education: Cornell University; UC Berkeley School of Law
- Occupation: Private investigator
- Spouse: Sandra Sutherland

John Arthur Palladino (July 9, 1944 – February 1, 2021) was an American private investigator and attorney. In 1977, he founded the private detective agency Palladino & Sutherland with his wife, Sandra Sutherland, and over a career spanning more than four decades, Palladino specialized in the preparation for trial of witnesses and evidence in litigation. He was best known for his work in the Peoples Temple tragedy, his defense of car maker John DeLorean, for the Bill Clinton presidential election committee, the tobacco industry whistleblower Jeffrey Wigand, singer Courtney Love, and musician R. Kelly.

On January 28, 2021, Palladino suffered a traumatic brain injury and was placed on life support following a robbery outside his Haight-Ashbury home. He was taken off life support and died on February 1, 2021.

== Early years ==
Palladino was born in Boston on July 9, 1944. His father was employed as a pipefitter. Palladino attended Boston Latin School, graduating in 1962, and went on to study English at Cornell University, obtaining a bachelor's degree from that institution. He moved to the San Francisco Bay Area to pursue graduate studies at University of California, Berkeley, first as a Ford Fellow in political science (graduating in 1968), then at UC Berkeley School of Law (earning a Juris Doctor in 1975). He was subsequently admitted to the State Bar of California three years later.

In 1977 he founded the private detective agency Palladino & Sutherland with his wife Sandra Sutherland. Palladino and Sutherland met in 1972 during the course of an undercover investigation into abuses against the inmates of Nassau County jail on Long Island on behalf of the Long Island District Attorney. They later worked together for four years at San Francisco's Hal Lipset agency, but left that employment to start their own agency.

== Career ==
In a career that spanned nearly 50 years, Palladino became known for taking on high-profile and controversial cases. The San Francisco Examiner noted in 1999 that he had "built a reputation for aggressive investigations, an in-your-face style and the ability to neutralize adverse witnesses and spin hostile media." With Sutherland, he investigated fraud, personal injury, medical malpractice and murder cases.

While still in law school at University of California, Berkeley, Palladino was hired by the family of Patty Hearst to assist in the matter of her 1974 kidnapping by the Symbionese Liberation Army (SLA). He also spent seven years investigating the Peoples Temple tragedy, a.k.a. Jonestown, in which more than 900 members of a religious cult died in Guyana in 1978. His interviews with surviving members of the cult and their families are now part of the definitive history of that event.

In 1982, John DeLorean, a former General Motors executive who had formed the independent DeLorean Motor Company, was charged with engaging in a cocaine trafficking deal to fund his company. Palladino & Sutherland interviewed more than two hundred witnesses in a defense that convinced the jury to acquit DeLorean based on entrapment by government agents.

Palladino was perhaps best known for being hired by the Bill Clinton presidential election committee to challenge a campaign intended to deny Clinton the Democratic nomination. Palladino's work included discrediting women with whom Clinton supposedly had been intimate, according to Newsweek magazine. The Clinton election committee reportedly paid Palladino more than $100,000 over several years to investigate two dozen women in a damage control inquiry. Michael Isikoff claimed the Clinton campaign used deception regarding the payments. He said the payouts came from campaign funds, but were listed as legal fees paid to a Denver law firm rather than payments to Palladino. He further claimed that Clinton's chief of staff Betsey Wright later told him the funds were for "controlling bimbo eruptions".

Palladino was also employed by singer Courtney Love to talk to journalists investigating whether she was involved in the 1994 death of her husband, singer Kurt Cobain. Palladino insisted he was never involved in "fear and intimidation" in his investigations and production of dossiers on such journalists.

When former tobacco executive Jeffrey Wigand began cooperating with 60 Minutes on insider revelations of tobacco company manipulations designed to increase smoker addiction, the industry launched a million dollar public relations campaign to discredit him. Palladino engaged in a counter-investigation that turned the spotlight onto this smear campaign and preserved Wigand's credibility as an expert witness in a lawsuit that subsequently resulted in a more than two hundred billion dollar settlement, in the first successful litigation against Big Tobacco. This effort is chronicled in Marie Brenner's May 1996 Vanity Fair article "The Man Who Knew Too Much" and in the 1999 Michael Mann film The Insider. In that movie, Palladino appeared as himself, and his partner, Sandra Sutherland, was played by actress Megan Odebash.

In 2002, singer, songwriter, and record producer R. Kelly was charged with videotaping himself having sex with an underage teenage girl. An investigation by Palladino that lasted six years culminated in Palladino's testimony at trial challenging the principal prosecution witness, and the acquittal of Kelly in less than a day.

In April 2009, Australian businessman Peter Holmes à Court admitted in the Supreme Court of New South Wales that the Hollywood actor Russell Crowe had hired Palladino & Sutherland to investigate opposition to the planned takeover of the South Sydney Rabbitohs. Crowe had first gotten to know Palladino and his Australian wife and partner, Sandra Sutherland, when all three worked on the film The Insider.

Ronan Farrow reported in November 2017 that Harvey Weinstein had, through the lawyer David Boies, employed the private intelligence agencies Kroll Inc., Black Cube and private investigator Jack Palladino to spy on and influence Weinstein's alleged victims as well as reporters who were investigating Weinstein, in order to prevent his conduct from becoming public.

Other notable clients included Don Johnson, Kevin Costner, Robin Williams, Huey P. Newton, the Hells Angels and Snoop Dogg.

== Personal life ==
Palladino first married at age 19, but divorced after four-and-a-half years. In 1977 he married the Australian-born Sandra Sutherland. He had stepsons Nick and Jude Chapman and a stepdaughter Amanda from Sutherland's former marriage to a research physiologist. Sutherland was also a poet, and Palladino an avid photographer who often roamed his neighborhood taking pictures.

=== Robbery and death ===
On January 28, 2021, Palladino suffered a traumatic head injury and was placed on life support after a robbery that took place in front of his Haight-Ashbury home. According to reports, he was taking pictures of suspicious activity with a camera on a strap around his neck. When a thief in an Acura car grabbed the camera, Palladino was thrown to the pavement and dragged behind the car for about 40 feet. Police used photos on the camera to identify the suspects, and two men were arrested for attempted murder on January 29 and 30, 2021. Palladino died from his injuries at San Francisco General Hospital on February 1, 2021. Prosecutors dropped the charges against the suspects in 2023.
