= Robert Holmes à Court =

Australian businessman

- Born: Michael Robert Hamilton Holmes à Court; 27 July 1937; Johannesburg, Transvaal, South Africa
- Died: 2 September 1990 (aged 53); Keysbrook, Western Australia, Australia
- Education: University of Auckland; Massey Agricultural College (BAgrSci); University of Western Australia (LLB)
- Occupations: Lawyer, businessman
- Years active: 1968–1990
- Known for: Australia's first billionaire
- Spouse: Janet Lee Ranford (m. 1966)
- Children: 4, including Peter Holmes à Court, Paul Holmes à Court and Simon Holmes à Court

Michael Robert Hamilton Holmes à Court (27 July 1937 – 2 September 1990) was a South African-born Australian businessman who became Australia's first billionaire. He died suddenly of heart failure in 1990 at the age of 53.

A great-great-grandson of William à Court-Holmes, 2nd Baron Heytesbury, and a grand-nephew of William Frederick Holmes à Court, 3rd Baron Heytesbury, Holmes à Court was one of the world's most feared corporate raiders through the 1980s, having increased his properties single-handedly from virtually nothing to a diversified resources and media group with an estimated value immediately before the 1987 stock market crash of about A$2 billion. Shareholders in the company enjoyed enormous investment growth. Holmes à Court's horse Black Knight won the 1984 Melbourne Cup.

Holmes à Court died intestate, and his estate was to be divided one-third for his widow Janet, and the remainder equally among their four children, who include Peter, Paul and Simon.

== Early life ==
Holmes à Court was born on 27 July 1937 in Johannesburg, South Africa, the son of Peter Worsley Holmes à Court and Ethnee Celia, née Cumming. His grandfather was Henry Worsley Holmes à Court, who was a brother of William Holmes à Court, 3rd Baron Heytesbury and Leonard Holmes à Court, 4th Baron Heytesbury. He spent much of his early life in Southern Rhodesia. He was educated at Cordwalles Preparatory School and Michaelhouse School in Natal, South Africa. There he earned money selling his schoolmates photographs he had taken of them, and by driving them home in exchange for their travel allowances.

Holmes à Court studied forestry in New Zealand at the University of Auckland and Massey University, where he graduated with a Bachelor of Agricultural Science in 1962. He then moved to Perth, Western Australia, in 1961 to study law at the University of Western Australia, where he graduated with a Bachelor of Laws in 1965. He married science teacher Janet Ranford on 18 May 1966. Holmes à Court was admitted to practise on 17 April 1968. He then worked as a barrister and solicitor. His law practice in Perth was sometimes in partnership with Nicholas Hasluck.

== Business career ==
Holmes à Court entered the corporate stage by accident in 1970, when his law firm was asked to act as administrative receiver of a small publicly listed company, Western Australian Worsted & Woollen Mills (later Albany Woollen Mills, also known as AWM or WA Wool). The company was the single largest employer in the regional city of Albany. In what he later described as his most challenging "takeover" — probably because it was his first —, he found a way to invest $500,000 in the ailing business, on the proviso that the Minister for Industry, Charles Court, would persuade the Government of Western Australia to forgive the $500,000 in loans they had made.

The source of funds for his initial investment in WA Wool were never made clear, since the $75,000 deposit for the purchase price of WA Wool shares came from a bank account that he shared with the partners in his law firm at the time, and his partners asked for these funds to be repaid. Nevertheless, since Holmes à Court had no other apparent source of income at the time, a possibility is that his mother Ethnee financed his first foray into business, since she had stood to inherit from her mother Florence, who in turn had stood to inherit from her second husband H.R. Cumming, a wealthy Rhodesian landowner, businessman and colleague of Cecil Rhodes. Cumming had helped raise Ethnee during her childhood on his estate outside Gweru. As an adult and while living in Rhodesia and South Africa, Ethnee had also established and sold both a riding school and a game lodge in Chobe, and eventually sold several properties that she owned as investments giving the funds to Robert to manage on her migration to Australia in 1967.

After acquiring WA Wool, Holmes à Court made it more competitive by reducing production costs, mainly by installing the latest wool milling and weaving machinery. This was acquired on favourable terms from a leading Belgian equipment manufacturer, which was keen to enter the Australian market at that time. He now controlled a company listed on the Australian Securities Exchange, and from there he began to gain control of a string of small businesses, including Westate Electrical Industries.

In 1977, Holmes à Court's brother Simon disappeared in mysterious circumstances in Africa. His abandoned car was found more than 1,000 km from his home and where he was last seen in Botswana. Author Geoff Elliott wrote a book about the disappearance.

== Death ==
A heavy smoker who suffered from diabetes, Holmes à Court died of heart failure in bed on the morning of 2 September 1990. Holmes à Court died intestate and his estate was to be divided one-third for his widow Janet, and the remainder equally among their four children. Heytesbury Holdings continues as one of the largest private companies in Australia. Janet Holmes à Court managed Heytesbury from the time of her husband's death until 2005, when she retired. She was, at one time, Australia's richest woman. The couple's eldest son, Peter Holmes à Court, is now a major investor and entrepreneur in his own right, after divesting himself of his share of Heytesbury, reported as A$35 million.

Peter Holmes à Court, along with Russell Crowe, is the 75.8% owner of National Rugby League club South Sydney Rabbitohs. Another son, Paul Holmes à Court, has since taken over as chief executive. Robert Holmes à Court's other children are Simon, who is an academic concerned with the environment and climate and founder of climate fund Climate 200, and Catherine (married, with four children). Holmes à Court's mother Ethnee died at the age of 98 in May 2014.

Robert and Janet Holmes à Court had 12 grandchildren by 2005, according to an interview with her.
