= Paul Holmes à Court =

Australian businessman and wine maker (born 1972)

- Born: Paul William Holmes à Court; 1972 (age 53–54); Swan District Hospital, Midland, Perth, WA
- Occupations: Businessman, Wine Maker, Pastoralist
- Title: CEO of Vasse Felix and owner of Heytesbury Pty. Ltd.
- Children: 6
- Parent(s): Robert Holmes à Court; Janet Ranford
- Relatives: Peter Holmes à Court (brother), Simon Holmes à Court (brother)

Paul Holmes à Court (born Paul William Holmes à Court in 1972) is an Australian businessman and wine maker. He is the son of Australia's first billionaire Robert Holmes à Court and CEO of Vasse Felix.

== Early life ==
Holmes à Court was born in 1972, the son of South African-born Australian businessman Robert Holmes à Court (who became Australia's first billionaire), and businesswoman (and chairperson of Heytesbury Pty Ltd), Janet Holmes à Court.

== Career ==
In 2000, Holmes à Court took over the management of Heytesbury from his mother Janet after his father Robert died in 1990. In 2008 Holmes à Court bought out his siblings and took over sole ownership of the company.

== Personal life ==
Holmes à Court is the Northern Territory's largest individual pastoral landowner, owning over 16,700 square kilometers.

Holmes à Court has 6 children.
