= Australian Institute of Building =

Professional society for building practice

- AIB Coat of Arms
- Abbreviation: AIB
- Formation: 1951
- Legal status: Royal charter
- Purpose: Building industry
- Headquarters: Canberra, Australian Capital Territory
- Location: Australia
- Region served: Australia and Asia Pacific
- President: Paul Heather
- Affiliations: Master Builders Association, Australian Institute of Quantity Surveyors, Australian Institute of Building Surveyors, Australian Construction Industry Forum
- Website: www.aib.org.au

The Australian Institute of Building (AIB) is a professional society founded in 1951, incorporated in 1955 and granted a royal charter in 1969. The institute is an association of building professionals, associate professionals and technicians engaged in building practice, teaching, or research throughout Australia and overseas. It has chapter offices in Hong Kong and Singapore and had a chapter office in New Zealand until the formation of the New Zealand Institute of Building in 1984.

== Mission ==
The mission of AIB is to be a leading body of focus for the building industry, valued for its services to its members, reflecting its ideals for education, standards and ethics and the source of authoritative and visionary comment on behalf of professionals in the industry. Its objectives are to promote excellence in the construction of buildings and just and honourable practices in the conduct of business; to advance the study of building and all kindred matters, arts and sciences; to encourage the friendly exchange between members of knowledge in practical, technical and ethical subjects; and to uphold the dignity of the profession of building and the status of the institute.

== History ==
Serving building professionals, the AIB has helped create standards for professional competency and regulation of education standards for the various educational programs related to its mission. It has played the lead role in the establishment of all building and construction management undergraduate programs offered by Australian universities.

Following World War II, the building industry was confronted with a huge programme of civil and commercial building. This called for improved productivity, more intelligent use of resources available and the development of new techniques and new material. Leaders of the industry appreciated that building was developing from empirical craft processes to a technological discipline spanning physical sciences and involving construction techniques which were unknown in the early part of the 20th century. Development in the science of environment and building services had also added a new dimension to building technology.

As building involved investment of public and private capital to a greater extent than any other commodity, rational, economic and efficient working was essential. Skill in the management of building work is as important as the technology itself. A trend to higher educational standards and a more positive approach to training executive and technical staff of Building organisations was clearly required.

The effect of this impact on the building industry was to highlight the need for a professional body to promote efficiency and establish a high standard of technological education for those engaged on the construction side of the industry.

A 'Committee of Investigation' was set up in 1947 by a convention called by the then Master Builders' Federation of Australia (MBFA) which, although firmly established since 1890, was not acceptable as a professional body because it was an employers' organisation. There was agreement that an Institute should be constituted on professional lines to represent the construction side of the building industry, and both the Royal Australian Institute of Architects (RAIA) and the Institution of Engineers Australia (IEAust) agreed to assist in selecting the foundation membership.

The Australian Institute of Builders was established in 1951 with a foundation membership determined by a selection committee in each state, comprising two representatives of the RAIA, one representative of the IEAust and two representatives of the MBFA. The Foundation Members also included members of the Building Diplomats Association of NSW, associated with the Sydney Technical College.

On 23 November 1951 the Foundation Dinner was held in Sydney and the Prime Minister of Australia, Robert Menzies, was presented with a Certificate of Honorary Membership. The institute was incorporated on 15 November 1955, granted armorial bearings on 20 August 1960 and incorporated by royal charter on 7 October 1969, despite the protests of the CIOB(UK). It had, on 26 May 1967, changed its name to the Australian Institute of Building (AIB).

Having established itself and received recognition accorded by a royal charter, the institute began to redefine its educational requirements at Licentiate and Corporate grade. It then set about ensuring that the then degree and certificate courses in building which were available met the standards which the institute required. From this has developed a course assessment/qualification accreditation system which has proven to be of great value to academic institutions and the industry.

While graduates in building were recognised immediately by the private sector, recognition in the public sector was harder to achieve. The breakthrough came in 1977 with the recognition by the Public Service Board of Degrees in Building for the positions of Project Manager Class 1–3, Area Manager Class 1–3 and Construction Manager. Recognition of the AIB as a professional institute was accorded in the Commonwealth Gazette in March 1983. This approval, under the Industrial Research and Development Incentives Act, recognises corporate members of the institute as professionally qualified.

Since its establishment in 1968 the Australian Institute of Building Research and Education Foundation has funded developments in education and specific research projects. One of these projects determined the duties and responsibilities of, and the levels of competence required by, professionals and technicians in the building industry. In 1990 the AIB became an Associate of the International Council for Building Research (CIB). The AIB Papers, a journal of refereed academic papers, has been published by the institute since 1986.

The by-laws and regulations were amended to allow for changes to grades of member in 1981, 1992 and 1997.

With the Foundation of a New Zealand Institute of Building (NZIOB) in 1984, the New Zealand Chapter of the AIB was closed down. The AIB continues to have a close relationship with NZIOB.

To streamline management decisions, in 1996 the council delegated most of its authority to an Executive Board of Management. In 1997 the AIB became a foundation member of the International Association for the Professional Management of Construction (IAPMC).

Pending the development of industry-wide, competency-based standards, the institute produced standards for its own membership purposes. These standards are also used for assessing applicants for the National Building Professionals Register (NBPR) which the AIB launched in 1997. A Hong Kong Chapter was established in 1998, and AIB's overseas operations expanded considerably ten years later.

AIB is also the convenor of the Australian Building and Construction Higher Education Round Table, the peak body to bring together the construction industry and Australian universities.

Prince Philip was an honorary fellow.

== Notable office bearers ==
- Manuel Hornibrook (President 1952–1956), founder of Hornibrook was made an Officer of the Order of the British Empire in 1957 and a Knight Bachelor in 1960 for services to the building industry.
- Albert Jennings (President 1964–1966), founder of AVJennings, was made a Knight Bachelor in 1969 for services to commerce.

== Building standards ==
AIB participates in generating building standards and helping regulate bringing new and existing buildings up to code in areas like asbestos and bush fire safety.

== Arms ==
Coat of arms of the Australian Institute of Building
Adopted Granted by the Kings of Arms, 20 August 1960 (Earl Marshal's Warrant, 19 February 1960). Crest On a Wreath of the Colours between two branches of Mimosa flowered proper a Castle of four towers also proper. Helm A closed Helmet, mantling Gules doubled Or. Escutcheon Or, a right-angled Chevron reversed Gules between in chief an open Book proper inscribed with the word 'Scientia' in Letters Sable, and in base throughout a Stone Wall embattled also proper. Supporters On the dexter side a Kangaroo proper, and on the sinister side a Lion Guardant also proper, each gorged with a Mural Crown Or. Compartment A field of Grass Vert. Symbolism The red chevron represents a Square, a common tool used in construction. The open book with "Scientia" (Knowledge) refers to the Institute's role in education and open learning. The unfinished stone wall at the bottom of the escutcheon alludes to the solid foundation of the Institute and the constant progress of development. The Kangaroo is symbolic of Australia, while the Lion is symbolic of the United Kingdom and refers to the links between the Institute and the Institute of Building in the UK; both supporters are gorged (collared) by a Mural Crown to signify the Royal oversight of the Academy through the royal charter. The four-towered castle in the crest emphasises that building is the profession, while the branches of silver wattle (mimosa) are representative of Australia's Floral Emblem.
