= Peter Holmes à Court =

Australian businessman (born 1968)

- Born: 1968 (age 57–58)
- Occupation: Businessman
- Parent(s): Robert Holmes à Court (father), Janet Holmes à Court (mother)
- Relatives: Simon Holmes à Court (brother), Paul Holmes à Court (brother)

Peter Holmes à Court (born 1968) is an Australian businessman.

He is the eldest son of the late billionaire businessman Robert Holmes à Court and Janet Holmes à Court. He was joint owner of the National Rugby League team South Sydney Rabbitohs together with Russell Crowe from 2006 until 2014.

== Education ==
After completing his schooling at Geelong Grammar School in Corio, he read law at Oxford University and finally received his BA in economics and theatre from Middlebury College, Vermont.

== Overseas ventures ==
In 1993 Holmes à Court formed Back Row Productions, operating in New York City, London and Sydney. Back Row produced at least twenty live shows in thirty countries and 300 cities worldwide. Back Row Productions, produced and promoted tours of "Tap Dogs" and standup turns by comics Eddie Izzard and Jerry Seinfeld. It staged shows in 30 countries and turned out ancillary videos, CDs and DVDs. In 1994 Holmes à Court put together an off-Broadway rock musical, Fallen Angel. The show was open for three weeks and lost most of Holmes à Court's available capital as well as the capital put in by investors. Peter's mother, Janet Holmes à Court's official biography states: "Newly married, Peter Holmes à Court was impatient for success and not interested in working in a hands-on way to learn the theatre business, as someone like Cameron Mackintosh had done. Peter had some tough lessons early. Billy Boesky's rock and roll musical, Fallen Angel, was Peter's first off-Broadway show, which he put together in 1994. It stayed open three weeks and lost most of Peter's available capital and that of some investor's close to home who weren't happy with the result".

== Return to Australia ==
In 1996 Holmes à Court became involved in a dispute over a contracted tour of Lift-Off Live, a spin-off of an Australian Broadcasting Corporation educational television show, Lift Off, which was booked and scheduled. Holmes à Court wanted to close the show down, despite contractual obligations. To make things more complicated his mother Janet's company, Heytesbury, was an investor in Lift Off and was entitled to income from ancillary rights. Janet Holmes à Court's biographer, Patricia Edgar, details the incident in another book, Bloodbath: a memoir of Australian television, stating that Back Row Productions was also in financial trouble. Edgar describes how Janet initially reacted to the situation by attempting to force Peter to meet his obligations, but later wanted to assume the Back Row Productions' debt and pay out of her own pocket to save her son from ignominy. "Janet suggested that she assume Back Row's debt with the Foundation and pay out of her own pocket. She knew Peter was in financial difficulties and this was a way to avert further damage..."

In 2000 Holmes à Court settled out of court with his family to gain his inheritance from the family company, Heytesbury. Holmes à Court's father, Robert Holmes à Court, died intestate leaving his wife Janet one third of the family fortune with the four children getting the other two-thirds. The amount Peter Holmes à Court received was reported as A$35 million.

At the same time he took up the position as chief executive officer of the Australian Agricultural Company (AACo) and was responsible for re-listing AACo on the Australian Stock Exchange. With his younger brother Paul Holmes à Court in charge of Heytesbury, Peter had effectively set himself up in competition with his family's primary business.

In 2004 Holmes à Court stood down from the post of CEO of the AACo.

== South Sydney Rabbitohs ==
In March 2006 Holmes à Court and Russell Crowe gained 75% ownership of the South Sydney Rabbitohs through a vote of the membership of the club. Holmes à Court became Executive Chairman of the club. In early 2008 he became CEO of the Rabbitohs after Shane Richardson resigned and took up a position as Director of Sports Operations in Holmes à Court's company The Passionate Group in October 2007.

In May 2008 Holmes à Court resigned as Executive Chairman and CEO of the South Sydney Rabbitohs. Some reports suggested that Holmes à Court had been forced to stand down after his relationship with Crowe had deteriorated.

At the same time as Holmes à Court stood aside, the previous CEO, Shane Richardson, was subsequently re-appointed to the role of CEO of the Rabbitohs. Nick Pappas was also re-appointed as chairman.

In April 2009, Holmes à Court was recalled to the witness box in the NSW Supreme Court in a defamation case brought against him by Tony Papaconstuntinos, known as Tony Papa, a Member of the South Sydney Rabbitohs. Holmes à Court said that Russell Crowe had hired San Francisco-based husband-and-wife team Palladino & Sutherland (Jack Palladino), to do surveillance work on people opposed to their planned takeover of the South Sydney Football Club. Holmes a Court admitted that Crowe had engaged the investigators but that he had also given instructions to Sandra Sutherland and the firm had used its "Australian associates" to conduct surveillance of the "no" campaign.

In August 2009 it was revealed by The Sydney Morning Herald that Holmes à Court had ignored NSW Supreme Court orders for payment of costs to several people who had been subpoenaed by Holmes à Court in the Tony Papa defamation case. The newspaper revealed, on 22 August 2009, that writs for levy of property had been taken out by two long-time members of the South Sydney Rabbitohs. This action designated Holmes à Court a "judgement debtor" and enabled the NSW Sheriff's office to seize property on behalf of the two Rabbitohs Members.

On 4 September 2009, Holmes à Court was found, by Justice Lucy McCallum in the NSW Supreme Court, to have defamed Tony Papaconstuntinos. Justice McCallum ordered Holmes à Court to pay A$25,000 and all costs. Holmes à Court claimed a "moral victory".

In March 2010 Holmes à Court resigned as a director of the Rabbitohs, but remained a 37.5% shareholder in partnership with Russell Crowe until 2014. In October 2014, less than a month after the club's 2014 premiership, Holmes à Court sold his stake in the club to casino entrepreneur and Sydney Roosters fan James Packer.

== Current activities ==
Holmes à Court is the chairman of White Bull Holdings, a private investment company. He is also a director of ISFM, The Passionate Group, and Viocorp.

In March 2010 Holmes à Court resigned as a director of Queensland Rail, having served on the board since 2006.

Holmes à Court is a member of the Lord Mayor's City of Sydney Business Forum. In April 2010 he was appointed as head of the 'Greater Sydney Partnership', a NSW Government initiative to promote Sydney globally.

In November 2010, The Sydney Morning Herald revealed that Holmes à Court was departing from the Greater Sydney Partnership. He said his departure just eight months after he took on the role of chairman was "premature". Holmes à Court also said he was "not thrilled at the prospect of sitting at home alone", as his wife and children were leaving for Europe and "plans to set himself up in a farmhouse to write a book". In January 2020 Viking published that book as Riding With Giants: My struggles with modern capitalism, the lessons from children and the joys of cycling fast. Riding with Giants is a book about struggles with modern capitalism, Peter’s lessons from children and the joys of cycling fast. Peter narrates how he left a privileged life and moved to France where he led a rather lonely life while his seven year old girls asked "Why are we here?”

In June 2011, The Sydney Morning Herald reported that Holmes à Court had stepped down from the Barangaroo Delivery Authority Board after missing three consecutive board meetings while on sabbatical in France.
