= Simon Holmes à Court =

Australian entrepreneur

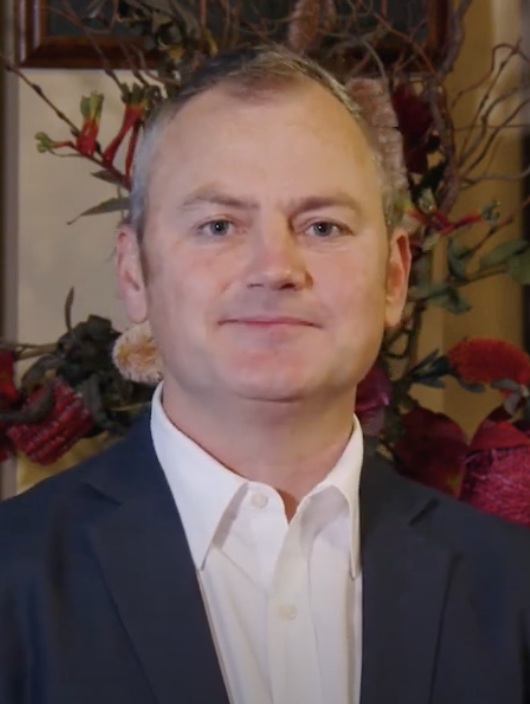
- Born: Simon Antony Holmes à Court; 1971 or 1972; Swan District Hospital, Midland, Western Australia
- Education: Geelong Grammar School
- Alma mater: University of Western Australia; Dartmouth College
- Occupations: Entrepreneur, convenor of Climate 200, director of the Smart Energy Council
- Spouse: Katrina Holmes à Court
- Children: 4
- Parent(s): Robert Holmes à Court; Janet Ranford
- Relatives: Peter Holmes à Court (brother), Paul Holmes à Court (brother)

Simon Holmes à Court (born 1971 or 1972) is an Australian businessman and political activist. He is the son of Australia's first billionaire Robert Holmes à Court, and convenor of Climate 200. He is also a senior advisor to the Climate and Energy College at the University of Melbourne, as director of the Smart Energy Council and the Australian Environmental Grant-makers Network.

== Early life ==
Holmes à Court was born in 1971 or 1972, the son of South African-born Australian businessman Robert Holmes à Court (who became Australia's first billionaire) and businesswoman (and chairperson of Heytesbury Pty Ltd) Janet Holmes à Court.

Holmes à Court grew up in Perth but he and his siblings were sent to Victoria to board at Geelong Grammar School, where he met his wife Katrina. He began an arts/law degree at the University of Western Australia, where he was involved in student politics, but withdrew after a few years. He then moved to Malaysia to work for the family-owned John Holland Group on IT projects. Holmes à Court subsequently moved to the United States to study cognitive science and computer science at Dartmouth College.

== Career ==
After completing his degree, Holmes à Court spent five years working in Silicon Valley, including for Netscape, before returning to Australia in 2001. He then began working for the family-owned Heytesbury Pty. Ltd. attempting to improve the efficiency of their eight cattle stations in the Northern Territory. He subsequently established Observant Pty Ltd as a company to develop remote water monitoring systems and other products.

Holmes à Court was a driving force behind Australia's first community-owned wind farm, Hepburn Wind, near Daylesford in Central Victoria.

== Politics ==
=== Kooyong 200 and feud with Josh Frydenberg ===
Holmes à Court was a financial supporter and member of federal Liberal MP Josh Frydenberg's Kooyong 200 fundraising arm. He was expelled by Frydenberg after he wrote an op-ed in Guardian Australia in 2018 supporting the closure of AGL's coal-fired Liddell Power Station.

Later in 2019 Holmes à Court was kicked out of the Auburn Hotel in Hawthorn East at a "meet the candidate" event with Frydenberg before the 2019 election. Holmes à Court stated "I found myself standing on the footpath with a glass of wine," Holmes à Court says. "The hostess said, 'You have to leave now.' I said, 'Can I finish my drink?' She said, 'No, the Treasurer says you have to leave now.'"

Frydenberg criticised Holmes à Court for spending much of the COVID-19 Melbourne lockdowns at his farm in Daylesford with his family. Holmes à Court responded by saying "I don't even understand his angle... two of my family members were seriously ill, it was the most shit fucking time ever, so Josh can fuck off, excuse me. It was not a pleasant time at all. He doesn't know me.”

=== Climate 200 ===
In the lead up to the 2019 Australian federal election, Climate200 raised nearly half a million dollars for the campaign. It helped support the campaigns of Zali Steggall, Helen Haines and Rebekha Sharkie.

In the lead up to 2022 election, Holmes à Court began to get more press coverage, which helped to raise the profile of Climate 200. On 14 October 2021, Holmes à Court appeared on Q+A alongside Liberal MP Tim Wilson, Labor MP Chris Bowen, Amelia Telford (Director of SEED Indigenous Youth Climate Network) and Anne Baker (Mayor of Issac Regional Council).

==== The Big Teal ====
In 2022, Holmes à Court released The Big Teal as part of Monash University Publishing's 'In The National Interest' series.

=== Defamation suit against The Daily Telegraph and the Daily Mail ===
On the 17 May, four days before the 2022 election, Holmes à Court used the phrase "Angel of Death" to refer to John Howard. This was in reference to a quote by a Liberal insider from The Saturday Paper who said "I look at John Howard as the angel of death.

He was accused by various members of the Liberal party of comparing Howard to Nazi doctor Josef Mengele, although the Executive Council of Australian Jewry said that they accepted that there were many uses for the term and were satisfied that Holmes à Court was not referencing the Nazis.

On 18 May, Holmes à Court launched a defamation action against The Daily Telegraph and the Daily Mail news outlets and is also considering suing Liberal MP Dave Sharma, who accused Holmes à Court of a Holocaust slur.

=== Other incidents ===
Holmes à Court was criticised in April 2019 for calling Senator Jane Hume out for "bitchiness", and in February 2022 for calling Sarah Henderson a "#Crumbmaiden".

Holmes à Court has been described by Warren Mundine as the "Clive Palmer but on the left" and that he is "just one of those filthy-rich spoiled brats who think they ... influence elections by spending millions and millions of dollars.”

There was speculation in the News Corp press that Holmes à Court and his family could make a profit out of a "potential boom in clean energy."

Liberal MP Jason Falinski claimed that Holmes à Court is "attempting to take over the Parliament with money" and that "he treats Australians as though their vote is for sale."

In May 2022, Leader of TNL Party, Victor Kline, accused Holmes à Court of bullying him into dropping out as a federal candidate for the seat of North Sydney. The following day Holmes à Court was accused again of bullying by British climate activist Zion Lights.

During the campaign for the 2022 election, Holmes à Court sued Victorian senator Jane Hume for allegedly lying about him on the radio. Holmes à Court approached Hume at a pre-poll booth asking her if she was willing to withdraw her accusations. The confrontation was filmed by Josh Frydenberg on his phone and was posted to Twitter. Another version of the exchange was later released showing Hume calling Holmes à Court an "arsehole". Hume and Holmes à Court clashed again on the Channel 9 coverage of election night.

== Personal life ==
Holmes à Court married his wife Katrina in 1997 and they have four children together. They own a 36-hectare off-grid farm in Daylesford, Victoria where they lived during Melbourne's lockdown.
