= Heytesbury Pty. Ltd. =

Holding company owned by the Holmes à Court family in Western Australia

Heytesbury Pty Ltd
- Formerly: Heytesbury Holdings
- Company type: Private
- Industry: Investments
- Founded: 6 February 1923
- Owner: Paul Holmes à Court
- Website: www.heytesbury.com.au

Heytesbury Pty Ltd is the privately owned company of the Holmes à Court family in Western Australia.

It was founded in 1923 as Heytesbury Holdings. In the 1970s it became Robert Holmes à Court holding company of his rapidly expanding financial empire. After the sale of its interests in Bell Group and Bell Resources in 1988, Heytesbury became a private investment vehicle, acquiring Stoll Moss Theatres and Sherwin Pastoral Co, and investing in companies such as Jaguar Cars, Christie's, Standard Chartered and US Steel.

Following the death of Robert Holmes à Court in September 1990, his widow Janet took over the management of Heytesbury. Over the next decade a number of assets were sold to reduce the company's heavy debts, including the Stoll Moss Group, a number of cattle stations in Northern Australia, and John Holland, which was purchased in 1991 after Robert's death. In May 1991 the Bell Brothers transport business was purchased from Boral.

In February 2000, a 70% stake in John Holland was sold to Leighton Holdings. The remainder was sold in 2004.

In 2000 eldest son Peter Holmes à Court, elected to sell his one-sixth share of Heytesbury to pursue his own interests. Robert Holmes à Court had died intestate (without a will), leaving his wife one third of the family fortune with the four children getting the other two thirds. The amount Peter received was reported as $35 million.

In July 2001 Paul Holmes à Court, the youngest son of Robert and Janet Holmes à Court, took over the management of Heytesbury. In the same year, Peter Holmes à Court was appointed to the position of chief executive officer of the Australian Agricultural Company (AACo) and was responsible for re-listing it on the Australian Securities Exchange. This set Peter up in direct competition with the family, since the primary business of both Heytesbury and AACo was cattle.

In 2008, Paul bought out his other family shareholders and took sole ownership of the company.

Heytesbury now owns a number of large cattle stations in Northern Australia including Mount Sanford Station and Victoria River Downs, Vasse Felix and the thoroughbred stud Heytesbury Stud near Perth.
