= Kylea Tink =

Australian politician and charity CEO

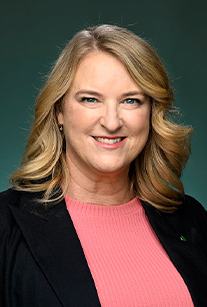

Member of the Australian Parliament for North Sydney
- In office 21 May 2022 – 28 March 2025
- Preceded by: Trent Zimmerman
- Succeeded by: Seat abolished

Personal details
- Born: 5 September 1970 (age 56) Coonabarabran, New South Wales, Australia
- Party: Independent
- Website: Official website

Kylea Jane Tink (pron. /ˈkaɪli/, "Kylie"; born 5 September 1970) is an Australian former politician who represented the Division of North Sydney from 2022 to 2025. Before entering politics, she had a career in communications and campaigning. She is a former managing director of Edelman Australia, chief executive of the McGrath Foundation and Chief Executive of Camp Quality. She has been described as a teal independent.

== Early life and education ==
Kylea Jane Tink was born on 5 September 1970, in the country New South Wales town of Coonabarabran.

She was educated at Coonabarabran High School, and went on to study at Australian National University.

== Business career ==
Tink is a former managing director of Edelman Australia, the largest public relations firm in the world by revenue.

She worked pro bono as a PR consultant for the McGrath Foundation, after being invited to assist the growing organisation following the death of Jane McGrath. In 2008 she took up the role of CEO of the foundation, a role she held from until 2014. Tink was one of the people who helped bring about the Pink Test, a cricketing fundraiser that raises awareness and money for the foundation, including significant grants from the government. They also managed to gain partnerships beyond cricket, including a partnership with St. George Illawarra Dragons in 2013. During her time as CEO the number of breast care nurses in Australia went up from four in 2008 to over 61 in 2011, and over 100 by the time she left the charity in 2014.

Tink was appointed CEO of Camp Quality in 2016, starting in the role in 2017. Under her leadership, the charity saw changes in their structure, including starting a Kids Impacted by a Carers Cancer (KICC) Camp, for children of parents diagnosed with cancer.

== Political career ==
North Sydney's Independent launched in June 2021, putting out a public call for candidates to unseat Liberal incumbent Trent Zimmerman. Tink's name was one of the prospects put forward, and was interviewed by the group in "walking meetings" around parks in the area, due to the limitations of the COVID-19 lockdowns at the time. Tink declared her candidacy for North Sydney on 18 September 2021, having been selected by North Sydney's Independent and naming action on climate change as a key issue. Tink won the seat at the 2022 federal election, defeating Zimmerman 53–47 percent after preferences.

Along with other independent politicians who won seats in the election, Tink was described as a teal independent. However, her colour of choice for campaigning is pink.

The main focus of Tink's campaign was climate policy and equality in society. On 30 August 2022, it was publicly revealed by the media that she was a shareholder of two energy companies. Viva Energy Group, which among other things refines oil for Shell in Australia and owns Geelong Oil Refinery, and Beach Energy, an oil and gas exploration and production firm. This was brought to light after Tink published her declaration of interests, a requirement of all MPs. Opposition leader Peter Dutton criticised Tink's ownership of shares in energy companies, given her advocacy on climate change.

In November 2022, Tink tabled her first private members bill advocating for cleaner, cheaper fuel, the Fuel and Vehicle Standards Legislation Amendment (Reducing Vehicle Pollution) Bill 2022.

Tink supports a constitutionally enshrined Voice to Parliament and supported the "Yes" vote in the 2023 Australian Indigenous Voice referendum.

In September 2024, the Australian Electoral Commission announced the abolition of Tink's seat of North Sydney, with its electorate spread across the divisions of Bradfield, Warringah and Bennelong. Though Tink initially did not rule out running for one of the divisions or for the Senate in the 2025 Australian federal election, she announced on 7 December 2024 that she would not run for the House of Representatives, instead endorsing independents Nicolette Boele for Bradfield and Zali Steggall for Warringah. In February 2025, Tink confirmed she would not run for the Senate.

== Personal life ==
Tink lives in Northbridge on the North Shore of Sydney and is a mother of three.

== See also ==
- Voices groups in Australia

Parliament of Australia
Preceded by Trent Zimmerman	Member for North Sydney; 2022–2025	Abolished
