= Helen Haines =

Australian politician (born 1961)

Helen Haines MP
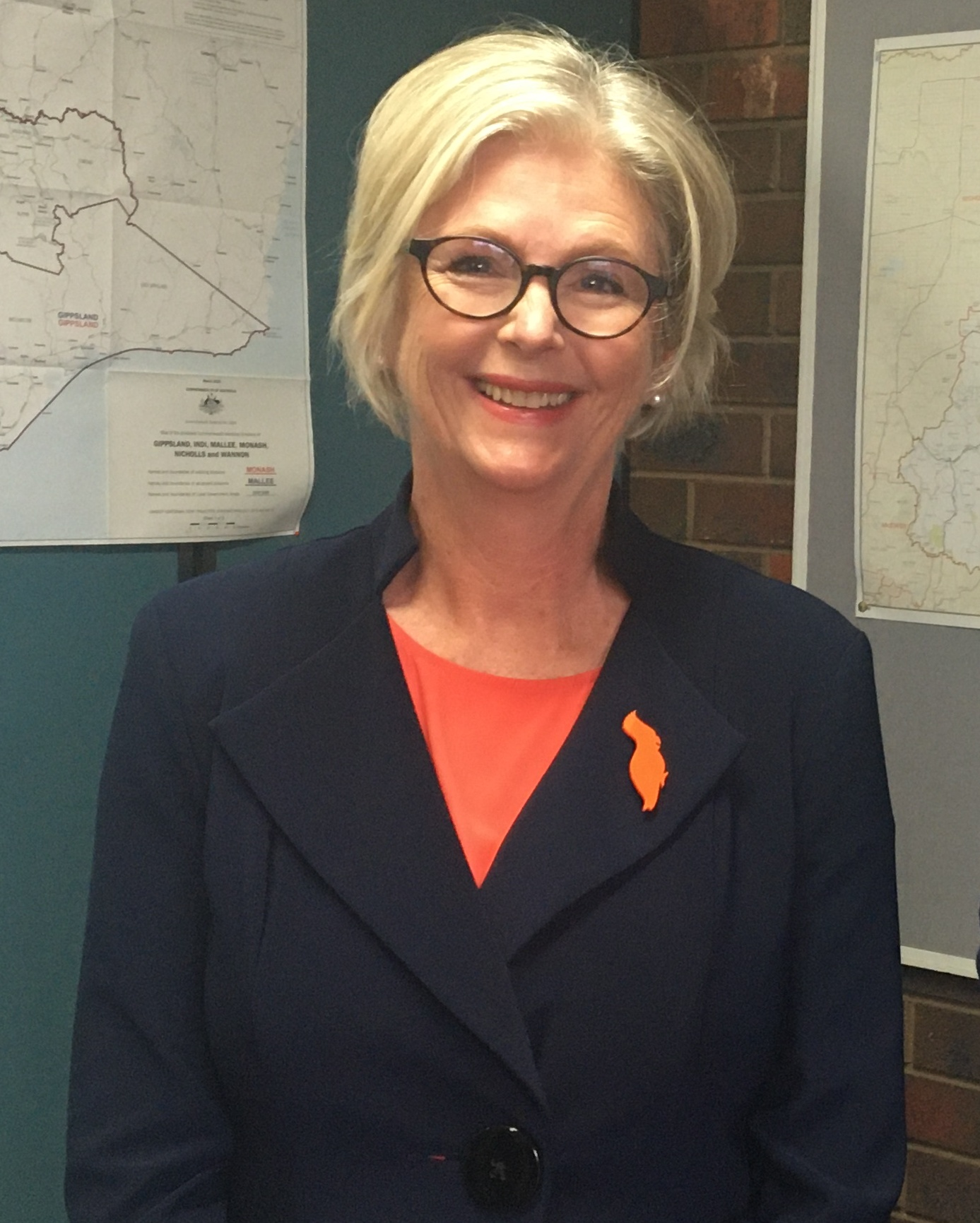
- Haines in 2022

Member of the Australian House of Representatives for Indi
- Incumbent
- Assumed office 18 May 2019
- Preceded by: Cathy McGowan

Personal details
- Born: Helen Mary Carew; 21 September 1961 (age 65) Colac, Victoria, Australia
- Party: Independent
- Spouse: Phil Haines (m. 1986)
- Children: 3
- Education: Deakin University (BN); University of New South Wales (MPH); Uppsala University (PhD)
- Occupation: Politician
- Profession: Nurse and health researcher
- Website: Official website

Helen Mary Haines (née Carew; born 21 September 1961) is an Australian politician and health researcher who has served as the independent member of Parliament (MP) for the Victorian division of Indi since 2019. Prior to entering politics, she worked in nursing and midwifery services, and as a health researcher in academia.

Born and raised in the Western District of Victoria, Haines trained as a nurse and midwife in Melbourne, and graduated from Deakin University with a bachelor's degree in nursing whilst working as a matron. She later earned a master's degree and doctorate from the University of New South Wales and Uppsala University, respectively. She was elected to the House of Representatives at the 2019 federal election, winning the regional seat of Indi after the retirement of incumbent MP Cathy McGowan.

As a member of Parliament, Haines has advocated for rural healthcare and housing, the building of resilience against climate change in regional Australia, and is outspoken on issues of corruption and government integrity.

In October 2026, Haines sustained critical injuries, including the loss of both legs, after being struck by a driver outside her electorate office in Wangaratta in what is described as an alleged deliberate vehicle ramming attack.

== Early life and education ==
Haines was born Helen Mary Carew on 21 September 1961, the only girl of five siblings. She was raised on a dairy farm in Eurack near Colac in southwestern Victoria, next door to her grandmother's farm.

Haines attended the local state primary school and then Trinity College Colac, where she was inaugural college captain after a merger of Trinity College and St Joseph's College (each single-sex schools) had taken place in 1979. She undertook a bachelor's degree in nursing through distance education at Deakin University while running the hospital at Chiltern (some time after 1987).

She later earned a master's degree in public health and epidemiology at the University of New South Wales, which led to a move to Uppsala, Sweden, in 2004, to study at Uppsala University. There, she commenced a doctoral degree in medical science, which was completed in 2012. Her doctoral thesis is titled "'No worries': A longitudinal study of fear, attitudes and beliefs about childbirth from a cohort of Australian and Swedish women".

== Career in health ==
Haines worked for over 30 years in rural health as a nurse, midwife, then researcher and academic after further studies.

=== Nursing ===
Haines trained as a registered nurse and midwife at St Vincent's Hospital in Melbourne, where two of her great-aunts had trained. She then moved back to northeastern Victoria and at the age of 26, was appointed matron of the Chiltern Bush Nursing Hospital. During this time, she undertook a bachelor's degree in nursing at Deakin University.

Later, she began working as a midwife at Wangaratta Hospital, where she led midwifery services, and was part of a team that created one of the longest-running rural midwifery programs in Australia.

=== Academia ===
Haines was a senior research fellow and director of the Rural Health Academic Network at the Department of Rural Health at the University of Melbourne from 2007 to 2019.

After completing her PhD, she was awarded a postdoctoral fellowship at the Karolinska Institute in Stockholm in 2014, and was adjunct visiting research fellow at Uppsala University from 2014 to 2019. She was also executive director for education and research at Northeast Health, Wangaratta, from 2018 to 2019.

Haines published more than 60 peer-reviewed scientific articles in the area of childbirth, maternal health, and rural health. She was one of eleven MPs elected to the 46th Parliament of Australia who possessed a PhD.

== Political career ==
On 13 January 2019, Haines was endorsed by community organisation Voices 4 Indi as the potential successor to incumbent MP Cathy McGowan for the division of Indi in the 2019 federal election. McGowan, an independent, had won the seat from the Liberal Party in the 2013 election and retained it in 2016, and had stated that she would retire at the 2019 election if she was confident that an independent successor, chosen by Voices 4 Indi, would be able to retain the seat. On 14 January 2019, McGowan formally announced her pending retirement, stating her confidence in Haines and endorsing her for the election.

In the lead-up to the election, Haines advocated for an increase to the JobSeeker payment and strong action on climate change, including a target of 50% renewable energy by 2030. She was one of seven independent candidates in the election to sign a joint agreement to cooperate on climate action in the new parliament; she also voiced her opposition to the proposed Adani coal mine in Queensland. She stressed the need for a national rural health service strategy and greater investment in rural infrastructure. She did not express a preference for either the Coalition or the Labor Party, stating that she would be willing to work with the government in either majority or minority. She also promised to hold the government accountable for promises it had made for Indi during the campaign.

=== First term (2019–2022) ===
In the 18 May 2019 federal election, Haines won Indi, winning 32.4% of the primary vote and 51.4% of the two-party preferred vote. She defeated Liberal Steve Martin on the sixth count on Labor preferences. She became the first independent in Australian history to succeed another independent in a federal seat. In her maiden speech on 1 August 2019, Haines spoke about the needs of rural Australia, particularly healthcare and the need for climate resilience in the regions, owing to its impact on farmers.

She worked with Labor to establish the National Anti-Corruption Commission. In November 2021, Haines introduced a bill in the House of Representatives to create an Australian Federal Independent Commission Against Corruption. The bill was supported by Labor, the crossbench, and Liberal Bridget Archer (who crossed the floor to vote in favour of debate), but otherwise opposed by the governing Coalition. While a majority of present MPs voted in favour, the bill failed due to a number of absences relating to COVID-19 restrictions. Haines became the Deputy Chair of the Parliamentary Joint Committee for the commission when it was established.

=== Second term (2022–2025) ===
Haines speaking at the 2022 declaration of results in the division of Indi.

At the 2022 federal election, Haines was re-elected with a significantly increased margin of 8.9%.

Following the election, the new Labor Government introduced legislation to establish a National Anti-Corruption Commission, in which Haines has been credited as a key player. Haines was deputy chair of the Joint Select Committee on National Anti-Corruption Legislation, which recommended multiple amendments to the legislation. The National Anti-Corruption Commission passed the Parliament on 24 November 2022 and commenced operations on 1 July 2023. Until Parliament was dissolved on 28 March 2025, Haines served as deputy chair of the Joint Committee on the National Anti-Corruption Commission.

After campaigning on the issue in the 2022 Australian Federal Election, Haines twice introduced legislation to reduce the cost of solar home batteries. When she introduced the Bill the second time. The bill was seconded by independent MPs Zali Steggall in 2022 and Allegra Spender in 2023.

During an address to the National Press Club and National Rural Press Club on 16 May 2023, Haines outlined housing pressure being experienced in rural and regional Australia and the potential solutions. This included a $2 billion Regional Housing Infrastructure Fund to invest in enabling infrastructure support new housing developments. A week after meeting with Haines about this proposal, Prime Minister Anthony Albanese announced a $500 million housing support program. Haines later introduced her Unlocking Regional Housing Bill to Parliament, which sought to equitably fund more houses in regional, rural, and remote areas. She has repeatedly advocated for health and housing services in regional Australia.

In October 2024 in Wodonga, Haines handed the Prime Minister a letter asking for Commonwealth assistance for a new hospital in Albury-Wodonga. The letter was compiled by the Border Medical Association and signed by more than 200 doctors. The Victorian and NSW Governments have proposed a redevelopment of the Albury Base Hospital. Haines has publicly stated she supports a greenfield, single-site hospital in Albury-Wodonga.

In the lead-up to the 2025 federal election, Haines confirmed that in the event of a hung parliament, she would not sign an agreement with either the Coalition or Australian Labor Party.

=== Third term (2025–present) ===
Haines was re-elected to a third term at the 2025 election with an increased primary vote, albeit with a slightly decreased two-candidate preferred margin.

Haines was appointed a member of the Speaker's panel from 23 July 2025.

In December 2025 an essay by Haines about the National Anti-Corruption Commission (NACC) was published by Australia Institute in The Point. At that time she was the Deputy Chair of the NACC's Parliamentary Joint Committee. The essay was an assessment of their progress and criticised the commissioner for his resistance to holding a public hearing, while acknowledging that there is often a need for hearings about corruption to protect the privacy of witnesses. She concluded that they should abolish the "exceptional circumstances" test that had been required to determine if hearings should be public.

In January 2026 she supported the gun law reforms that followed the Bondi Beach shooting. However, she criticised some of the other law reforms that were rushed in response to the shooting. She said the reforms should tackle "all forms of hate" and should not be rushed. She also questioned the necessity and relevance of immigration law changes.

In May 2026, following discussions about a new party of teal independents, Haines said that she would remain an independent.

Later in May 2026, Haines put forward a private member's bill mandating temporary roaming for telecommunications companies during natural disasters. While her bill was not supported by the government, three major telecommunications companies (Telstra, Optus, and TPG) introduced temporary disaster roaming in regional Australia on 1 October.

== Other roles and activities ==
Haines is a graduate of the Australian Institute of Company Directors and the Alpine Valleys Community Leadership program, and held board positions in both statutory and not-for-profit organisations before her political career. As of 2019 she was a board member of St Catherine's Aged Care in Wangaratta; Indigo Power Community Energy Retailer; Wangaratta Unlimited, the economic advisory board to the Rural City of Wangaratta (chair); Hume Medicare Local; and chair of the board of Ovens and King (now Gateway) Community Health Service, of which she is a life member.

== Recognition and awards ==
In 2022, Haines was awarded the McKinnon Prize (Note: "The prize is Australia's only independent, non-partisan award for outstanding political leadership. It seeks to recognise leaders, encourage national discussion and inspire others to pursue courageous and visionary political leadership." It has been awarded annually since 2017, in partnership between the independent non-profit organisation McKinnon (formerly known as the Susan McKinnon Foundation, founded in 2015 by Sophie Oh and Grant Rule,) and the University of Melbourne.) for Emerging Political Leader of the Year, for "her work on integrity in politics, dedication to serving her electorate" and her considerable impact as a 'community-driven' leader on the national stage".

== 2026 alleged attack ==
Haines was struck by a vehicle in Murphy Street outside her office in Wangaratta (pictured)

On 19 October 2026 at 15:35 AEDT, Haines was struck twice by a vehicle being driven in Murphy Street outside her electorate office in Wangaratta and was taken to hospital with critical injuries. In the hours after the incident, Prime Minister Anthony Albanese said it appeared to be a deliberate attack, and that Victoria Police would investigate together with the Australian Federal Police and ASIO. Albanese said in a press conference that the incident would "come as an incredible shock to that community", praising Haines as "a thoroughly decent human being, full of integrity, and respected right across the Parliament. Opposition Leader Angus Taylor said he was "deeply shocked by the incident", and political figures across Australia condemned the alleged attack. The targeting of Haines, an uncontroversial figure in Australian politics, came as a shock. The incident was reported worldwide.

Haines underwent surgery in a critical but stable condition at The Alfred Hospital in Melbourne. On 20 October, it was reported that one of her legs had to be amputated. The following day, Haines's husband Phil addressed the media, revealing that her right leg, which doctors were hoping to save, had to be amputated as well. On 24 October, Haines's condition improved to a serious but stable condition, and on 6 November hospital officials stated her condition had improved to stable. Haines was discharged from hospital on 16 November.

Politicians in Australia usually have minimal security. The alleged attack followed an increase in threats towards politicians, particularly female politicians, including Fatima Payman, Allegra Spender, Pauline Hanson and Lidia Thorpe. Some politicians said they no longer felt safe after the alleged attack. Senator Fatima Payman had made a statement questioning Prime Minister Anthony Albanese if he was "waiting for something like what happened to Dr Helen Haines". The statement faced backlash from fellow senators and MPs, with Labor Senator Don Farrell calling the statement "outrageous" due to its usage of Haines in an unrelated topic. Her family had requested donations to the charity Save the Children rather than flowers and more than $1.46 million was received.

=== Accused ===
At the scene, police arrested 43-year-old Brendan Nugent from Tarrawingee who is alleged to have been driving the white Toyota Land Cruiser that struck Haines. Nugent was known to police. A local barber had pulled Nugent out of the Land Cruiser, and made a citizen's arrest and removed a flick knife he saw in Nugent's pocket before police arrived.

In the 2010s, Nugent was an environmentalist, often searching for and researching the critically endangered Daviesia laevis plant in western Victoria. A park ranger once called him a "terrific scientist" that has "drawn many people into helping with the research". Nugent also had a masters degree in forest ecosystem science. Nugent was highly active on social media, frequently expressing frustration with disability support systems in Australia and expressing support for the State of Palestine in the Gaza war.

He had previously expressed support for Haines. His more recent activity also indicated signs of mental health issues, with neighbours reporting that he would be heard screaming and talking nonsensically. He had previously been seen at a mental health facility in Wangaratta, and underwent a mental health assessment after his arrest. A prison assessment of his mental health stated that he was likely in a state of psychosis at the time of the alleged attack, with his previous social media use believed to have been symptoms of a mental illness, with no signs of extremist behaviour noted.

Nugent's father and stepmother released a statement saying that they had been friends with Haines for over 20 years and that they will assist police. Victorian state Nationals MP Tim McCurdy, whose seat includes Wangaratta, said he had met with Nugent before, describing him as "frustrated" but not "threatening whatsoever".

On 20 October, Victoria Police charged Nugent with intentionally causing serious injury, dangerous driving causing serious injury, and the federal offence of causing harm to a Commonwealth public official. At an initial hearing the next day, no application for bail was made. His lawyer stated that he had autism, suffered from a neurological disorder and a concussion. He was remanded in custody until 4 February 2027, with the magistrate requesting he be seen by a medical professional immediately. On 28 October, The Age reported that Nugent had said the collision was an accident and that he had panicked.

== Personal life ==
Helen Carew married Phil Haines in November 1986. They live on a beef farm outside Wangaratta and raised three children. In 2021, to help celebrate the 90th anniversary of ABC Goulburn Murray radio station, Haines spoke about the value of local storytelling and dedication to one's community. Before being struck by a vehicle in October 2026, she maintained her fitness by participating in a charity marathon event in Wangaratta in her 60s, on the Centre Against Violence for the Ovens/Murray team.

== Writings and speeches ==
- Academic publications: "Helen M Haines | University of Melbourne | Verified email at aph.gov.au". on Google Scholar.
- Haines, Helen (1 August 2019). "First Speech: Dr Helen Haines MP". www.aph.gov.au. Parliament House, Canberra, ACT: Commonwealth Parliament. Archived from the original on 6 December 2025.
- Interview and transcript: Haines, Helen (27 November 2024). "The major party stitch-up with Helen Haines". Follow the Money (Interview). Interviewed by Ebony Bennett. The Australia Institute.
- Haines, Helen (18 December 2025). "The NACC's exceptional challenge: integrity is not achieved by secrecy, but by trust earned in the light". The Point. The Point is an initiative of the Australia Institute. Archived from the original on 4 November 2026.
- Videos of speeches on Helen Haines MP's YouTube channel: "www.youtube.com/@helenhainesmp805" – via YouTube.

== Footnotes ==
Parliament of Australia
Preceded by Cathy McGowan	Member for Indi; 2019–present	Incumbent
