= Electoral results for the Division of Farrer =

Australian division election results

This is a list of electoral results for the Division of Farrer in Australian federal elections from the electorate's creation in 1949 until the present.

== Members ==
Member	Party	Term
David Fairbairn	Liberal	1949–1975
Wal Fife	Liberal	1975–1984
Tim Fischer	National	1984–2001
Sussan Ley	Liberal	2001–2026
David Farley	One Nation	2026–present

== Election results ==
=== Elections in the 2020s ===
==== 2026 by-election ====
2026 Farrer by-election
Party	Candidate	Votes	%	±%
One Nation	David Farley	38,939	39.44	+32.84
Independent	Michelle Milthorpe	28,030	28.39	+8.43
Liberal	Raissa Butkowski	12,228	12.39	−31.02
National	Brad Robertson	9,608	9.73	+9.73
Legalise Cannabis	Aimee Lee Pearson	2,288	2.32	+2.32
Greens	Richard August Hendrie	2,221	2.25	−2.68
Shooters, Fishers, Farmers	Peter Sinclair	1,896	1.92	−1.55
Family First	Rebecca Scriven	1,176	1.19	−0.96
Independent	Gary Jean Pappin	761	0.77	+0.77
People First	Jamie Bonnefin	704	0.71	−1.31
Sustainable Australia	Lucas James Ellis	569	0.58	+0.58
Independent	Roger Woodward	311	0.31	+0.31
Total formal votes		98,731	93.48	+2.51
Informal votes		6,885	6.52	−2.51
Turnout		105,616	84.87	−6.68
Registered electors		124,447		
Two-candidate-preferred result
One Nation	David Farley	56,641	57.37	+57.37 (Note: In the 2025 Australian federal election, One Nation did not reach the two‑candidate‑preferred (2CP) count. This number reflects a shift from their 2025 2CP result of 0% to their result at this election.)
Independent	Michelle Milthorpe	42,090	42.63	+42.63 (Note: Michelle Milthorpe finished second in the 2025 Australian federal election to the Liberal candidate. This figure reflects that a two‑candidate‑preferred vote against One Nation was not calculated at the 2025 election.)
One Nation gain from Liberal				

Results are not final. Last updated on 10 May 2026 at 16:39 AEST.

==== 2025 ====
2025 Australian federal election: Farrer
Party	Candidate	Votes	%	±%
Liberal	Sussan Ley	44,743	43.41	−8.85
Independent	Michelle Milthorpe	20,567	19.96	+19.96
Labor	Glen Hyde	15,551	15.09	−3.90
One Nation	Emma Hicks	6,803	6.60	+0.27
Greens	Richard Hendrie	5,085	4.93	−4.18
Shooters, Fishers, Farmers	Peter Sinclair	3,577	3.47	−1.84
Trumpet of Patriots	Tanya Hargraves	2,441	2.37	+2.37
Family First	Rebecca Scriven	2,218	2.15	+2.15
People First	David O'Reilly	2,078	2.02	+2.02
Total formal votes		103,063	90.97	−1.44
Informal votes		10,234	9.03	+1.44
Turnout		113,297	91.55	+2.11
Notional two-party-preferred count
Liberal	Sussan Ley	64,812	62.89	−3.46
Labor	Glen Hyde	38,251	37.11	+3.46
Two-candidate-preferred result
Liberal	Sussan Ley	57,916	56.19	−10.16
Independent	Michelle Milthorpe	45,147	43.81	+43.81
Liberal hold				

==== 2022 ====
2022 Australian federal election: Farrer
Party	Candidate	Votes	%	±%
Liberal	Sussan Ley	52,566	52.26	+1.55
Labor	Darren Cameron	19,097	18.99	+4.35
Greens	Eli Davern	9,163	9.11	+4.45
One Nation	Richard Francis	6,363	6.33	+6.33
Shooters, Fishers, Farmers	Paul Britton	5,339	5.31	+5.31
United Australia	Julie Ramos	3,270	3.25	−1.01
Independent	Amanda Duncan-Strelec	3,189	3.17	+3.17
Liberal Democrats	Ian Roworth	1,595	1.59	+0.48
Total formal votes		100,582	92.41	+1.54
Informal votes		8,256	7.59	−1.54
Turnout		108,838	91.28	−1.36
Two-party-preferred result
Liberal	Sussan Ley	66,739	66.35	−3.48
Labor	Darren Cameron	33,843	33.65	+3.48
Liberal hold		Swing	−3.48	

Alluvial diagram for preference flows in the seat of Farrer in the 2022 federal election. The winning candidate got over 50% of first preference votes, so this alluvial diagram is indicative only, and preference flows were not used to determine the final result. The preference flows were used to determine the two-candidate-preferred.

=== Elections in the 2010s ===
==== 2019 ====
2019 Australian federal election: Farrer
Party	Candidate	Votes	%	±%
Liberal	Sussan Ley	49,316	50.71	−7.16
Independent	Kevin Mack	19,926	20.49	+20.49
Labor	Kieran Drabsch	14,236	14.64	−3.47
Greens	Dean Moss	4,529	4.66	−3.56
United Australia	Michael Rose	4,147	4.26	+4.26
Sustainable Australia	Ross Hamilton	1,429	1.47	+1.47
Christian Democrats	Philip Langfield	1,327	1.36	−2.24
Independent	Brian Mills	1,255	1.29	−2.99
Liberal Democrats	Mark Ellis	1,084	1.11	+1.11
Total formal votes		97,249	90.87	−2.73
Informal votes		9,768	9.13	+2.73
Turnout		107,017	92.64	+0.01
Notional two-party-preferred count
Liberal	Sussan Ley	67,908	69.83	−0.70
Labor	Kieran Drabsch	29,341	30.17	+0.70
Two-candidate-preferred result
Liberal	Sussan Ley	59,260	60.94	−9.59
Independent	Kevin Mack	37,989	39.06	+39.06
Liberal hold		Swing	N/A	

==== 2016 ====
2016 Australian federal election: Farrer
Party	Candidate	Votes	%	±%
Liberal	Sussan Ley	55,893	57.87	+13.85
Labor	Christian Kunde (disendorsed)	17,486	18.11	−2.07
Greens	Amanda Cohn	7,936	8.22	+4.28
Liberty Alliance	Ron Pike	5,874	6.08	+6.08
Independent	Brian Mills	4,133	4.28	+4.28
Christian Democrats	Paul Rossetto	3,474	3.60	+2.41
Mature Australia	Trevor O'Brien	1,783	1.85	+1.85
Total formal votes		96,579	93.60	+0.21
Informal votes		6,602	6.40	−0.21
Turnout		103,181	92.63	−3.81
Two-party-preferred result
Liberal	Sussan Ley	68,114	70.53	−1.18
Labor	Christian Kunde	28,465	29.47	+1.18
Liberal hold		Swing	−1.18	

==== 2013 ====
2013 Australian federal election: Farrer
Party	Candidate	Votes	%	±%
Liberal	Sussan Ley	47,977	57.81	+6.40
Labor	Gavin Hickey	19,708	23.75	−1.54
Greens	Christina Sobey	3,643	4.39	−1.49
Palmer United	Ronald Emmerton	3,392	4.09	+4.09
Katter's Australian	Ken Trewin	3,091	3.72	+3.72
Rise Up Australia	Narelle Davis	1,646	1.98	+1.98
Democratic Labour	Brendan Cattell	1,509	1.82	+1.82
Bullet Train	Tracey Powell	1,048	1.26	+1.26
Christian Democrats	Frank Horwill	982	1.18	−2.03
Total formal votes		82,996	92.89	−0.77
Informal votes		6,357	7.11	+0.77
Turnout		89,353	94.53	+0.35
Two-party-preferred result
Liberal	Sussan Ley	55,961	67.43	+2.92
Labor	Gavin Hickey	27,035	32.57	−2.92
Liberal hold		Swing	+2.92	

==== 2010 ====
2010 Australian federal election: Farrer
Party	Candidate	Votes	%	±%
Liberal	Sussan Ley	42,646	51.41	−5.87
Labor	Christian Emmery	20,981	25.29	−7.39
Independent	Louise Burge	9,350	11.27	+11.27
Greens	Peter Carruthers	4,880	5.88	+1.05
Christian Democrats	James Male	2,664	3.21	+3.21
Secular	Mathew Crothers	1,099	1.32	+1.32
	Jason Clancy	724	0.87	+0.87
Democrats	Stephen Bingle	603	0.73	+0.73
Total formal votes		82,947	93.66	−2.51
Informal votes		5,611	6.34	+2.51
Turnout		88,558	94.15	−2.09
Two-party-preferred result
Liberal	Sussan Ley	53,513	64.51	+3.32
Labor	Christian Emmery	29,434	35.49	−3.32
Liberal hold		Swing	+3.32	

=== Elections in the 2000s ===
==== 2007 ====
2007 Australian federal election: Farrer
Party	Candidate	Votes	%	±%
Liberal	Sussan Ley	49,794	57.73	+5.90
Labor	Chris Ryan	28,238	32.74	+6.30
Greens	Darran Stonehouse	4,169	4.83	+1.28
Family First	Rhonda Lever	2,657	3.08	+1.59
Climate Conservatives	Douglas McGregor Henderson	1,088	1.26	+1.26
Citizens Electoral Council	Pat Mathers	313	0.36	−0.15
Total formal votes		86,259	96.18	+2.38
Informal votes		3,427	3.82	−2.38
Turnout		89,686	95.49	−0.52
Two-party-preferred result
Liberal	Sussan Ley	52,766	61.17	−5.46
Labor	Chris Ryan	33,493	38.83	+5.46
Liberal hold		Swing	−5.46	

==== 2004 ====
2004 Australian federal election: Farrer
Party	Candidate	Votes	%	±%
Liberal	Sussan Ley	48,304	63.48	+25.82
Labor	Nico Mathews	17,354	22.81	+1.85
Greens	Bruce Rowston	2,732	3.59	+0.17
Independent	John Burbidge	1,956	2.57	+2.57
One Nation	Ray Jones	1,618	2.13	−4.22
Family First	Jennifer Weller	1,395	1.83	+1.83
Christian Democrats	Ian Paul Burn	1,275	1.68	+1.68
Independent	Matt Morgan	682	0.90	+0.90
Democrats	Frank Kovacs	463	0.61	−1.98
Citizens Electoral Council	Chris Lahy	318	0.42	+0.42
Total formal votes		76,097	93.30	−0.31
Informal votes		5,464	6.70	+0.31
Turnout		81,561	95.16	−0.42
Two-party-preferred result
Liberal	Sussan Ley	53,129	69.82	+19.68
Labor	Nico Mathews	22,968	30.18	+30.18
Liberal hold		Swing	+19.68	

==== 2001 ====
2001 Australian federal election: Farrer
Party	Candidate	Votes	%	±%
Liberal	Sussan Ley	28,449	37.66	+33.30
National	Bill Bott	17,641	23.36	−24.73
Labor	Frank Millen	15,830	20.96	−3.79
One Nation	Max Wilkinson	4,795	6.35	−7.61
Greens	Chris Sobey	2,583	3.42	+3.23
Democrats	Brett Paterson	1,959	2.59	−1.42
Independent	Sue Taylor	1,254	1.66	+1.66
Independent	Stuart Watson	1,068	1.41	+1.41
	Keith Kreutzberger	696	0.92	+0.92
Independent	Tom Weyrich	485	0.64	+0.64
Independent	Andrew Gibson	416	0.55	+0.55
Independent	David Corbett	356	0.47	+0.47
Total formal votes		75,532	93.61	−2.37
Informal votes		5,156	6.39	+2.37
Turnout		80,688	96.04	
Two-party-preferred result
Liberal	Sussan Ley	37,869	50.14	+50.14
National	Bill Bott	37,663	49.86	−14.76
Liberal gain from National		Swing	+50.14	

=== Elections in the 1990s ===
==== 1998 ====
1998 Australian federal election: Farrer
Party	Candidate	Votes	%	±%
National	Tim Fischer	36,602	52.87	−13.46
Labor	Vivien Voss	16,489	23.82	−0.85
One Nation	Don McKinnon	9,664	13.96	+13.96
Democrats	Rohan Sharp	2,940	4.25	−0.03
Independent	Amanda Duncan-Strelec	2,234	3.23	+3.23
Australia First	Cliff Broderick	728	1.05	+1.05
Citizens Electoral Council	Alan Boyd	329	0.48	+0.48
Abolish Child Support	Maurice Furlan	240	0.35	+0.35
Total formal votes		69,226	96.07	−0.51
Informal votes		2,830	3.93	+0.51
Turnout		72,056	95.91	−0.11
Two-party-preferred result
National	Tim Fischer	44,733	64.62	−6.61
Labor	Vivien Voss	24,493	35.38	+6.61
National hold		Swing	−6.61	

==== 1996 ====
1996 Australian federal election: Farrer
Party	Candidate	Votes	%	±%
National	Tim Fischer	47,231	66.34	+0.90
Labor	Lynda Summers	17,563	24.67	−5.06
Democrats	John Clancy	3,043	4.27	−0.56
Independent	Peter Whitfield	1,337	1.88	+1.88
Call to Australia	John Everingham	1,047	1.47	+1.47
Independent	Luke Downing	979	1.38	+1.38
Total formal votes		71,200	96.59	−0.63
Informal votes		2,517	3.41	+0.63
Turnout		73,717	96.02	−0.19
Two-party-preferred result
National	Tim Fischer	50,611	71.23	+3.80
Labor	Lynda Summers	20,439	28.77	−3.80
National hold		Swing	+3.80	

==== 1993 ====
1993 Australian federal election: Farrer
Party	Candidate	Votes	%	±%
National	Tim Fischer	45,447	65.44	−2.33
Labor	Bill Higgins	20,648	29.73	−2.49
Democrats	Ian McKenzie	3,354	4.83	+4.83
Total formal votes		69,449	97.22	−0.33
Informal votes		1,987	2.78	+0.33
Turnout		71,436	96.21	
Two-party-preferred result
National	Tim Fischer	46,829	67.43	−0.34
Labor	Bill Higgins	22,615	32.57	+0.34
National hold		Swing	−0.34	

==== 1990 ====
1990 Australian federal election: Farrer
Party	Candidate	Votes	%	±%
National	Tim Fischer	46,091	67.8	+9.6
Labor	Bill Higgins	21,898	32.2	−0.4
Total formal votes		67,989	97.6	
Informal votes		1,697	2.4	
Turnout		69,686	95.6	
National hold		Swing	+2.6	

=== Elections in the 1980s ===
==== 1987 ====
1987 Australian federal election: Farrer
Party	Candidate	Votes	%	±%
National	Tim Fischer	37,753	58.2	+14.8
Labor	Barry Marks	21,129	32.6	−3.2
Independent	Ray Brooks	5,977	9.2	+9.2
Total formal votes		64,859	96.2	
Informal votes		2,536	3.8	
Turnout		67,395	93.0	
Two-party-preferred result
National	Tim Fischer	42,302	65.2	+2.2
Labor	Barry Marks	22,555	34.8	−2.2
National hold		Swing	+2.2	

==== 1984 ====
1984 Australian federal election: Farrer
Party	Candidate	Votes	%	±%
National	Tim Fischer	26,986	43.4	+26.8
Labor	Eric Thomas	22,238	35.8	−5.2
Liberal	John Roach	12,915	20.8	−20.6
Total formal votes		62,139	95.9	
Informal votes		2,638	4.1	
Turnout		64,777	94.9	
Two-party-preferred result
National	Tim Fischer	39,116	63.0	+63.0
Labor	Eric Thomas	23,020	37.0	−5.6
National gain from Liberal		Swing	+63.0	

==== 1983 ====
1983 Australian federal election: Farrer
Party	Candidate	Votes	%	±%
Liberal	Wal Fife	40,060	57.4	−1.0
Labor	Noel Diffey	27,168	38.9	+5.3
Democrats	Scott Milne	1,872	2.7	−4.1
Progress	Maureen Nathan	740	1.1	−0.1
Total formal votes		69,840	98.6	
Informal votes		970	1.4	
Turnout		70,810	95.1	
Two-party-preferred result
Liberal	Wal Fife	41,347	59.2	−2.6
Labor	Noel Diffey	28,493	40.8	+2.6
Liberal hold		Swing	−2.6	

==== 1980 ====
1980 Australian federal election: Farrer
Party	Candidate	Votes	%	±%
Liberal	Wal Fife	39,670	58.4	−3.5
Labor	Lloyd Elliott	22,856	33.6	+3.7
Democrats	Rodney Dominish	4,613	6.8	+0.7
Progress	Maureen Nathan	808	1.2	+0.2
Total formal votes		67,947	98.4	
Informal votes		1,100	1.6	
Turnout		69,047	95.0	
Two-party-preferred result
Liberal	Wal Fife		61.8	−4.6
Labor	Lloyd Elliott		38.2	+4.6
Liberal hold		Swing	−4.6	

=== Elections in the 1970s ===
==== 1977 ====
1977 Australian federal election: Farrer
Party	Candidate	Votes	%	±%
Liberal	Wal Fife	40,187	61.9	+11.5
Labor	Donald Fleming	19,400	29.9	+0.2
Democrats	Margaret Healey	3,962	6.1	+6.1
Independent	Thomas Guy	718	1.1	+1.1
Progress	Maureen Nathan	643	1.0	+0.1
Total formal votes		64,910	98.1	
Informal votes		1,230	1.9	
Turnout		66,140	94.9	
Two-party-preferred result
Liberal	Wal Fife		66.4	−0.7
Labor	Donald Fleming		33.6	+0.7
Liberal hold		Swing	−0.7	

==== 1975 ====
1975 Australian federal election: Farrer
Party	Candidate	Votes	%	±%
Liberal	Wal Fife	29,570	49.4	−6.1
Labor	Patrick Brassil	18,100	30.4	−9.5
National Country	Kevin Bowtell	10,403	17.5	+17.5
Democratic Labor	Anthony Quinn	519	0.9	+0.9
Workers	Arthur Robinson	514	0.9	+0.9
Australia	Mike Donelan	413	0.7	−3.6
Total formal votes		59,519	98.6	
Informal votes		867	1.4	
Turnout		60,386	95.8	
Two-party-preferred result
Liberal	Wal Fife		66.4	+9.3
Labor	Patrick Brassil		33.6	−9.3
Liberal hold		Swing	+9.3	

==== 1974 ====
1974 Australian federal election: Farrer
Party	Candidate	Votes	%	±%
Liberal	David Fairbairn	32,125	55.8	+7.9
Labor	Kevin Esler	22,926	39.9	+1.6
Australia	Peter Benton	2,477	4.3	−2.4
Total formal votes		57,528	98.6	
Informal votes		795	1.4	
Turnout		58,323	95.7	
Two-party-preferred result
Liberal	David Fairbairn		57.1	+1.1
Labor	Kevin Esler		42.9	−1.1
Liberal hold		Swing	+1.1	

==== 1972 ====
1972 Australian federal election: Farrer
Party	Candidate	Votes	%	±%
Liberal	David Fairbairn	24,096	47.9	−7.0
Labor	Kevin Esler	19,276	38.3	+6.0
Democratic Labor	Anthony Quinn	3,531	7.0	−0.4
Australia	Mike Donelan	3,394	6.7	+6.7
Total formal votes		50,297	98.7	
Informal votes		653	1.3	
Turnout		50,950	95.9	
Two-party-preferred result
Liberal	David Fairbairn	28,145	56.0	−7.5
Labor	Kevin Esler	22,152	44.0	+7.5
Liberal hold		Swing	−7.5	

=== Elections in the 1960s ===
==== 1969 ====
1969 Australian federal election: Farrer
Party	Candidate	Votes	%	±%
Liberal	David Fairbairn	26,058	54.9	−11.0
Labor	Noel Murray	15,324	32.3	+8.1
Democratic Labor	James Keogh	3,507	7.4	−2.5
Independent	John Ross	2,574	5.4	+5.4
Total formal votes		47,463	98.7	
Informal votes		625	1.3	
Turnout		48,088	95.8	
Two-party-preferred result
Liberal	David Fairbairn		63.5	−11.3
Labor	Noel Murray		36.5	+11.3
Liberal hold		Swing	−11.3	

==== 1966 ====
1966 Australian federal election: Farrer
Party	Candidate	Votes	%	±%
Liberal	David Fairbairn	28,700	66.6	+7.7
Labor	Alan Thomson	10,151	23.5	−8.3
Democratic Labor	James Keogh	4,271	9.9	+0.6
Total formal votes		43,122	98.1	
Informal votes		830	1.9	
Turnout		43,952	96.0	
Two-party-preferred result
Liberal	David Fairbairn		75.5	+9.0
Labor	Alan Thomson		24.5	−9.0
Liberal hold		Swing	+9.0	

==== 1963 ====
1963 Australian federal election: Farrer
Party	Candidate	Votes	%	±%
Liberal	David Fairbairn	24,744	58.9	+3.2
Labor	Herb McPherson	13,341	31.8	−2.3
Democratic Labor	Lawrence Esler	3,901	9.3	−1.0
Total formal votes		41,986	99.1	
Informal votes		384	0.9	
Turnout		42,370	96.4	
Two-party-preferred result
Liberal	David Fairbairn		66.5	+2.4
Labor	Herb McPherson		33.5	−2.4
Liberal hold		Swing	+2.4	

==== 1961 ====
1961 Australian federal election: Farrer
Party	Candidate	Votes	%	±%
Liberal	David Fairbairn	22,707	55.7	−2.4
Labor	Herb McPherson	13,899	34.1	+3.2
Democratic Labor	William Brennan	4,195	10.3	−0.7
Total formal votes		40,801	98.4	
Informal votes		678	1.6	
Turnout		41,479	96.2	
Two-party-preferred result
Liberal	David Fairbairn		64.1	−3.0
Labor	Herb McPherson		35.9	+3.0
Liberal hold		Swing	−3.0	

=== Elections in the 1950s ===
==== 1958 ====
1958 Australian federal election: Farrer
Party	Candidate	Votes	%	±%
Liberal	David Fairbairn	23,395	58.1	−7.8
Labor	Robert Garland	12,441	30.9	−3.2
Democratic Labor	William Brennan	4,412	11.0	+11.0
Total formal votes		40,248	97.9	
Informal votes		850	2.1	
Turnout		41,098	95.9	
Two-party-preferred result
Liberal	David Fairbairn		67.1	+1.2
Labor	Robert Garland		32.9	−1.2
Liberal hold		Swing	+1.2	

==== 1955 ====
1955 Australian federal election: Farrer
Party	Candidate	Votes	%	±%
Liberal	David Fairbairn	25,805	65.9	+8.8
Labor	Robert Garland	13,361	34.1	−8.8
Total formal votes		39,166	97.9	
Informal votes		855	2.1	
Turnout		40,021	95.6	
Liberal hold		Swing	+8.8	

==== 1954 ====
1954 Australian federal election: Farrer
Party	Candidate	Votes	%	±%
Liberal	David Fairbairn	22,668	57.1	+0.7
Labor	Daniel Byrnes	17,005	42.9	−0.7
Total formal votes		39,673	99.2	
Informal votes		339	0.8	
Turnout		40,012	96.8	
Liberal hold		Swing	+0.7	

==== 1951 ====
1951 Australian federal election: Farrer
Party	Candidate	Votes	%	±%
Liberal	David Fairbairn	21,678	56.4	+18.2
Labor	Daniel Byrnes	26,744	43.6	+4.3
Total formal votes		38,422	98.5	
Informal votes		570	1.5	
Turnout		38,992	96.5	
Liberal hold		Swing	−2.4	

=== Elections in the 1940s ===
==== 1949 ====
1949 Australian federal election: Farrer
Party	Candidate	Votes	%	±%
Labor	Thomas McGrath	14,853	39.3	−7.0
Liberal	David Fairbairn	14,425	38.2	+20.4
Country	John Mackay	8,099	21.4	−14.1
Communist	Bill Gollan	419	1.1	+1.1
Total formal votes		37,796	98.3	
Informal votes		665	1.7	
Turnout		38,461	97.0	
Two-party-preferred result
Liberal	David Fairbairn	22,222	58.8	N/A
Labor	Thomas McGrath	15,574	41.2	N/A
Liberal notional gain from Country		Swing	N/A	
