= 2026 Farrer by-election =

Australian parliamentary by-election

- 9 May 2026

Division of Farrer (NSW) in the House of Representatives
- Registered: 124,447
- Turnout: 87.50% (▼6.55)

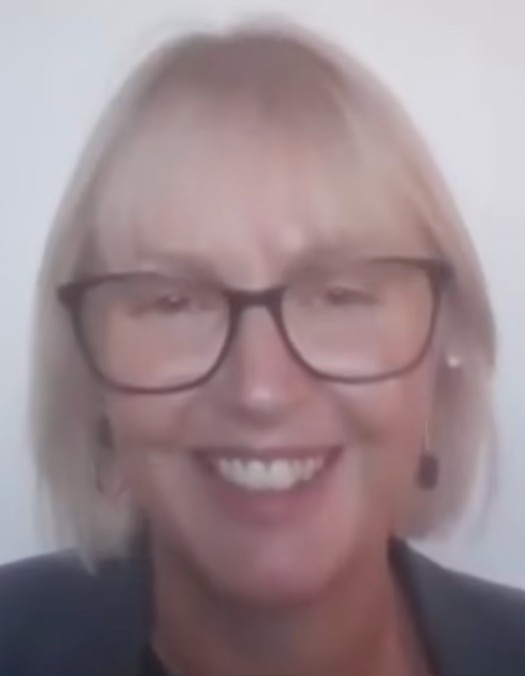

	First party	Second party
Candidate	David Farley	Michelle Milthorpe
Party	One Nation	Independent
Primary vote	39,978	28,410
Percentage	39.5%	28.1%
Swing	▲32.9 pp	▲8.1 pp
TCP	58,199	42,941
TCP %	57.5%	42.5%
TCP swing	▲57.5 pp	▲42.5 pp
	Third party	Fourth party
Candidate	Raissa Butkowski	Brad Robertson
Party	Liberal	National
Primary vote	12,550	9,896
Percentage	12.4%	9.8%
Swing	▼31.0 pp	▲9.8 pp
MP before election
Sussan Ley
Liberal
Elected MP
David Farley
One Nation

A by-election was held on 9 May 2026 to elect the Australian member of Parliament (MP) for the New South Wales division of Farrer. One Nation candidate David Farley was elected, defeating independent Michelle Milthorpe. The election was triggered by the resignation of former opposition leader and Liberal leader Sussan Ley.

It was the first by-election since the 2025 federal election, the first during Angus Taylor's leadership of the Liberals, the first during Matt Canavan's leadership of the Nationals, and the fifth during Anthony Albanese's tenure as prime minister. It was also the first time a One Nation candidate was elected to the House of Representatives.

== Key dates ==
- By-election announced — 5 March 2026
- Postal vote applications open — 5 March 2026
- Issue of writ — 1 April 2026
- Close of roll — 8 April 2026
- Close of nominations — 13 April 2026
- Declaration of nominations — 14 April 2026
- Early voting begins — 28 April 2026
- Postal vote applications close — 6 May 2026
- Polling day — 9 May 2026
- Return of writ — on or before 10 July 2026

== Background ==
=== Resignation ===
A leadership spill of the Liberal party room was held on 13 February 2026, where Sussan Ley was defeated by Angus Taylor 34 votes to 17 for the leadership of the party. Following the defeat, Ley fronted a press conference where she announced that she would resign from parliament "in the next couple of weeks".

On 27 February 2026, Ley officially submitted her resignation. On 5 March 2026, the Speaker of the House, Milton Dick, announced the by-election would be held on 9 May 2026.

=== Seat details ===
Farrer is a rural electorate located in the far southwestern area of New South Wales and includes the towns of Albury, Corowa, Narrandera, Leeton, Griffith, Deniliquin, Hay, Balranald and Wentworth. A traditionally conservative seat, the seat has historically been a safe Liberal seat since Ley first won it in 2001, though the Liberal Party suffered a 10% swing against it on the two-candidate preferred vote against an independent candidate in 2025, and won the seat on a reduced margin of 56.19% to 43.81%.

Two-party-preferred vote in Farrer, 1990–2025
Election	1990	1993	1996	1998	2001	2004	2007	2010	2013	2016	2019	2022	2025
Labor	32.21%	32.57%	28.77%	35.38%	—N/a	30.18%	38.83%	35.49%	32.57%	29.47%	30.17%	33.65%	37.11%
Liberal	—N/a	—N/a	—N/a	—N/a	50.14%	69.82%	61.17%	64.51%	67.43%	70.53%	69.83%	66.35%	62.89%
National	67.79%	67.43%	71.23%	64.62%	49.86%	—N/a	—N/a	—N/a	—N/a	—N/a	—N/a	—N/a	—N/a
Government	ALP	ALP	L/NP	L/NP	L/NP	L/NP	ALP	ALP	L/NP	L/NP	L/NP	ALP	ALP

=== 2025 election results ===
2025 Australian federal election: Farrer
Party	Candidate	Votes	%	±%
Liberal	Sussan Ley	44,743	43.41	−8.85
Independent	Michelle Milthorpe	20,567	19.96	+19.96
Labor	Glen Hyde	15,551	15.09	−3.90
One Nation	Emma Hicks	6,803	6.60	+0.27
Greens	Richard Hendrie	5,085	4.93	−4.18
Shooters, Fishers, Farmers	Peter Sinclair	3,577	3.47	−1.84
Trumpet of Patriots	Tanya Hargraves	2,441	2.37	+2.37
Family First	Rebecca Scriven	2,218	2.15	+2.15
People First	David O'Reilly	2,078	2.02	+2.02
Total formal votes		103,063	90.97	−1.44
Informal votes		10,234	9.03	+1.44
Turnout		113,297	91.55	+2.11
Notional two-party-preferred count
Liberal	Sussan Ley	64,812	62.89	−3.46
Labor	Glen Hyde	38,251	37.11	+3.46
Two-candidate-preferred result
Liberal	Sussan Ley	57,916	56.19	−10.16
Independent	Michelle Milthorpe	45,147	43.81	+43.81
Liberal hold				

== Candidates ==
Media characterised the by-election as a four-way race between the Liberals, Nationals, One Nation and independent candidate Michelle Milthorpe. Candidates are listed in ballot order.

Party	Candidate	Background
Liberal	Raissa Butkowski	Lawyer and City of Albury councillor
Independent	Michelle Milthorpe	Teacher, business owner and second-placing candidate for Farrer in 2025
People First	Jamie Bonnefin	Architect and small business owner
National	Brad Robertson	Australian Army veteran and former commander, Albury branch chair
Legalise Cannabis	Aimee Lee Pearson	Albury-based pharmacist
Greens	Richard August Hendrie	Mental health worker and fifth-placing candidate for Farrer in 2025
Independent	Roger Woodward	Seventh-placing candidate for Berowra in 2025
One Nation	David Farley	Former CEO of AACo and irrigation specialist
Family First	Rebecca Scriven	Works at a Christian school and eighth-placing candidate for Farrer in 2025
Sustainable Australia	Lucas James Ellis	Works in the planning sector
Independent	Gary Jean Pappin	Murray River Council councillor and retired farmer
Shooters, Fishers and Farmers	Peter Sinclair	Egg packer and sixth-placing candidate for Farrer in 2025

=== Liberal ===
On 23 February, The Australian reported that "the right faction of the Liberal Party has gained control of candidate preselection in a bid to stem the leakage of votes to One Nation". State Liberal MP Justin Clancy publicly expressed interest in running as the Liberal candidate; shortly after taking office as leader of the Liberal Party Angus Taylor called Clancy to discuss the by-election. On 27 February, Justin Clancy ruled out contesting Farrer. Nominations for Liberal preselection in Farrer closed on 2 March. Media reported former Sussan Ley staffer Lachlan McIntyre, and Albury councillor and lawyer Raissa Butkowski as candidates. The Liberal Party held their preselection vote on 15 March.

On 15 March, the Liberal Party preselected lawyer for the Hume Riverina Community Legal Service and City of Albury councillor Raissa Butkowski to contest the by-election. Butkowski is also a member of the Murray-Darling Association, an organisation that advocates for local government and water issues.

=== National ===
The National Party will contest Farrer for the first time since losing the seat in 2001, since Coalition rules in New South Wales forbid parties from running a candidate in a sitting Coalition MP's seat. Media reported former Nationals senator Perin Davey, Albury mayor Kevin Mack, the party's branch chairman Brad Robertson and Murray Irrigation Ltd director Gabrielle Coupland as potential candidates. Marty Corboy, the Nationals candidate for neighbouring Indi in 2016, endorsed Perin Davey. The Nationals selected Robertson as their candidate on 8 March. Robertson is an Australian Army veteran and former commander.

=== One Nation ===
On 13 February, party leader Pauline Hanson announced that One Nation will contest the by-election. On 27 February, One Nation announced that David Farley, Leigh Wolki and Guy Cooper were the three candidates seeking pre-selection, following a process that assessed 80 candidates. On 7 March, David Farley won preselection as the One Nation candidate. Hanson said it was the first time a branch had selected its own candidate.

Farley is a Narrandera-based agricultural businessman. He was formerly the CEO of Australian Agricultural Company. He was recently elected chair of the lobby group Speak Up 4 Water. He became a member of One Nation before Sussan Ley resigned.

=== Independent (Milthorpe) ===
Michelle Milthorpe was an independent candidate in the 2025 election and was supported by the community group Voices of Farrer and the Climate 200 fundraising organisation. On 13 February, she announced her intention to contest the by-election. She is also supported by Alasdair Macleod, who is married to Rupert Murdoch's daughter Prudence. His agribusiness Macdoch invests in regenerative agriculture and other methods which mitigate the effects of climate change. Milthorpe is a teacher from Jindera and an advocate for child abuse victims.

=== Other candidates ===
Family First ran Rebecca Scriven, an independent Christian school worker who ran for the party in 2025.

The Greens contested the by-election. They ran Richard Hendrie, a mental health worker who ran for the party in 2025.

On 14 February, Gerard Rennick announced that People First would contest the by-election. The party endorsed Jamie Bonnefin, an architect and the president of its NSW division.

The Sustainable Australia Party contested Farrer for the first time since 2019.

Gary Pappin ran as an independent.

Legalise Cannabis candidate Aimee Pearson, Shooters, Fishers and Farmers candidate Peter Sinclair and independent Roger Woodward were announced as candidates at the declaration of nominations.

=== Not contesting ===
The governing Australian Labor Party opted not to field a candidate in the by-election. Initially, Prime Minister Anthony Albanese said the party would decide whether to contest the by-election "once Sussan Ley actually resigns," however on 13 March 2026 the party's national executive met and decided against running a candidate. Speaking on condition of anonymity, a member of the executive reportedly said "we don’t want to create a disturbance or dilute the Coalition’s anti-One Nation vote."

Helen Dalton, independent state MP for the electoral district of Murray, was viewed as a potential challenger for the seat, with Dalton claiming that her mobile phone had "been burning up" since Ley's resignation. Dalton was also approached to run for the seat as a One Nation candidate. On 5 March, Dalton confirmed that she would not be a candidate.

Darren De Bortoli, the managing director of De Bortoli Wines, said he was approached to run by multiple parties but declined all offers.

Jordi Queiruga planned to run as an independent, but did not contest the seat.

== Campaign ==
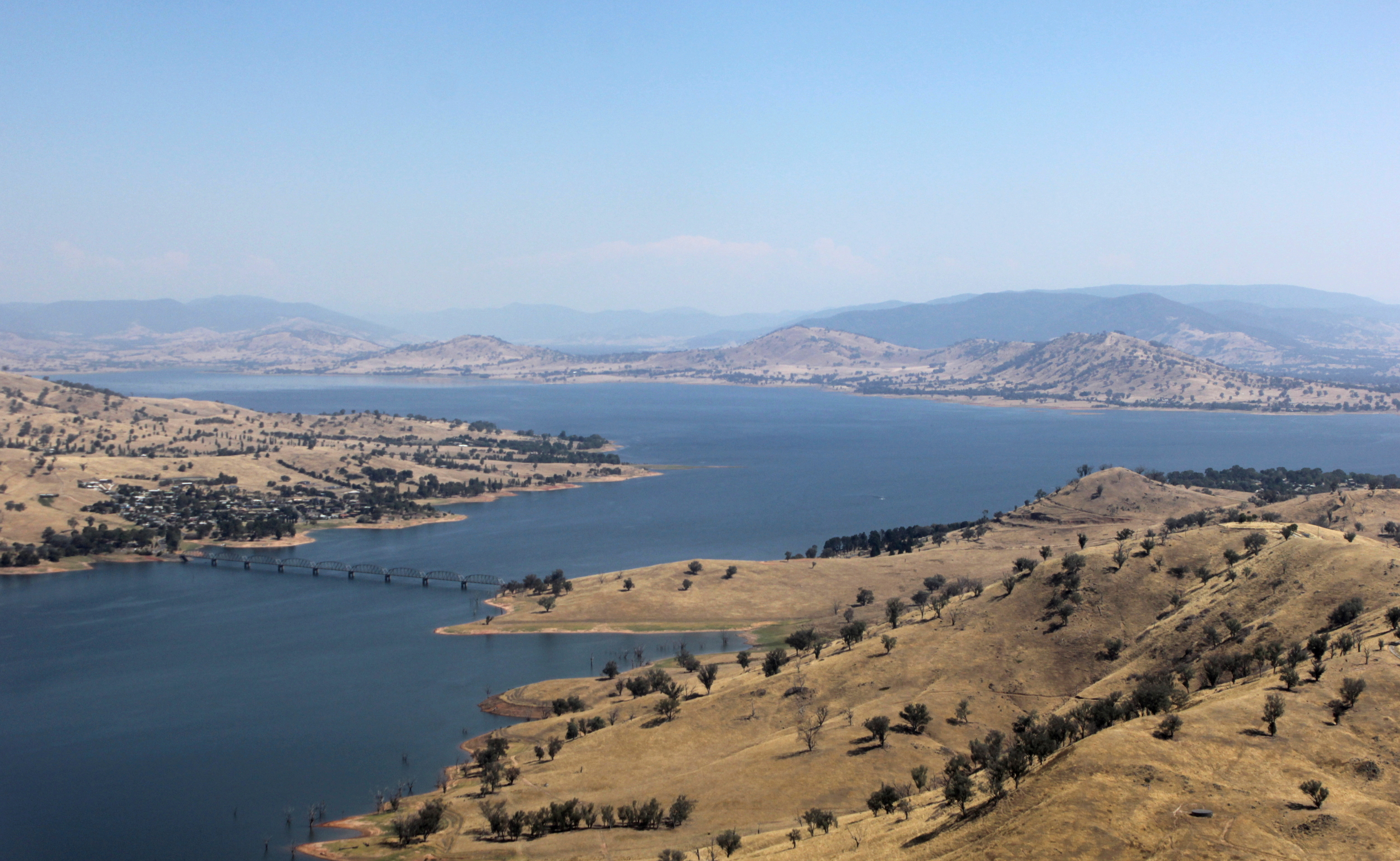
Lake Hume, a component of the Murray-Darling basin in Albury-Wodonga

The campaign primarily focused on local issues specific to the Farrer region, especially water management in the Murray-Darling basin, regional healthcare and cost of living.

The media resurfaced comments made by One Nation candidate David Farley in 2012 where he likened then–Prime Minister Julia Gillard to a "non-productive old cow". Farley and Pauline Hanson described the comments as tongue-in-cheek. Farley also provoked controversy and criticism for describing the crime in Griffith, a city in Farrer, as "hectic" and for sharing suggestive content on social media from OnlyFans creators, which he defended as accidental.

The Coalition launched attack advertisements against opponents David Farley and Michelle Milthorpe. They criticised One Nation for having "no solutions", and further criticised Farley for running for preselection to be a Labor candidate in 2022 and for having donated to them. They also released advertisements dubbing Milthorpe a "teal".

Progressive lobby group GetUp! had raised $400,000 for its anti–One Nation campaign by 22 April, and intended to spend at least $600,000 attacking the party by the close of polling.

=== Debates and forums ===
A debate was organised by the New South Wales Farmers' Federation and held at the Deniliquin RSL club on 21 April. It was attended by seven of the twelve candidates and moderated by Harold Clapham.

An anti-abortion forum organised by Dr Joanna Howe was held in Albury on 24 April. It was attended by the One Nation, Family First, and Nationals candidates as well as Senator Matt Canavan, though all candidates were reportedly invited. The event was criticised by state MLC Amanda Cohn, and the three candidates who attended were all endorsed by Howe.

Charles Sturt University organised a debate for 30 April, moderated by political journalist Barrie Cassidy. Nine of the 12 candidates were in attendance.

=== Election day ===
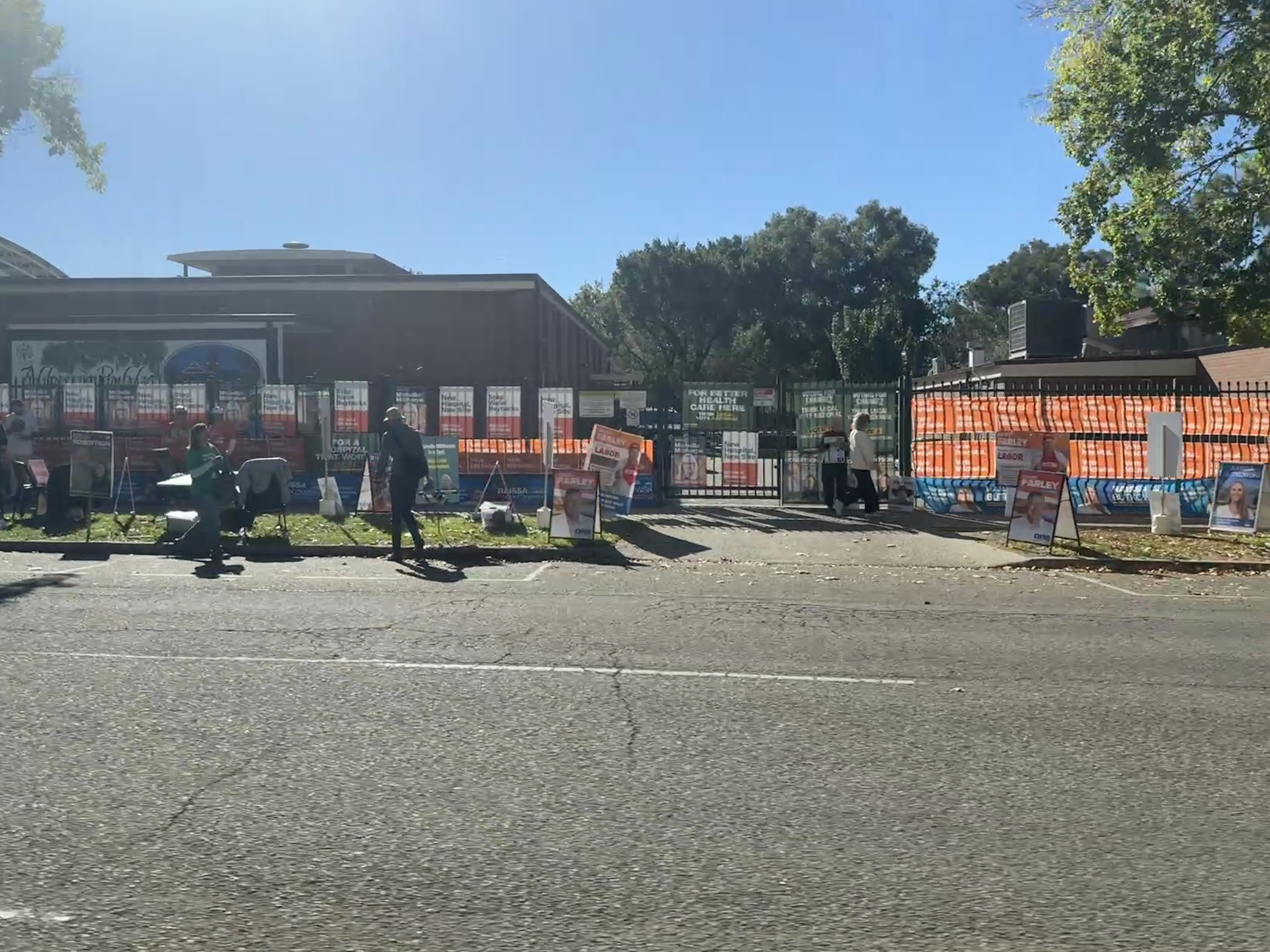
Polling place at Albury on election day

A sign bearing the Australian Electoral Commission's logo without authorisation was displayed at the Orana Community Centre polling place in Springdale Heights, containing information about political donations to Michelle Milthorpe. The sign was subsequently removed by the Commission following an injunction by the Federal Court of Australia.

== Opinion polling ==
Date	Firm	Sample size	Margin of error	Primary vote								2CP vote		
Date	Firm	Sample size	Margin of error	LIB	NAT	Milthorpe (IND)	ALP	ONP	GRN	OTH	UND	LIB	Milthorpe (IND)	ONP
9–10 Apr 2026	uComms (Note: Commissioned by Michelle Milthorpe.)	1,116	≈±3%	16.1%	7.1%	30.0%	—N/a	30.9%	3.8%	4.2%	7.9%	—N/a	47.3%	52.7%
11 Mar 2026	Matt Canavan becomes Nationals leader													
5–6 Mar 2026	uComms (Note: Commissioned by The Australia Institute.)	1,281	±2.73%	19.1%	5.2%	23.3%	9.0%	28.7%	3.9%	2.2%	8.6%	—N/a	—N/a	—N/a
27 Feb 2026	Sussan Ley resigns as an MP													
3 May 2025	2025 federal election			43.4%	—	20.0%	15.1%	6.6%	4.9%	10.0%	—	56.2%	43.8%	—

== Endorsements ==
=== Michelle Milthorpe ===
Michelle Milthorpe was endorsed by David Pocock, independent senator for the Australian Capital Territory, and Helen Haines, independent MP for the neighbouring electorate of Indi, at a campaign event in Albury on 6 March.

Katter's Australian MP Bob Katter also endorsed Milthorpe at the Albury Gold Cup, emphasising the importance of an independent crossbench holding the balance of power. He recognised "soft" support for One Nation, attributing it to a protest vote against the major parties, though also acknowledged Pauline Hanson's "excellent work in opposing migration".

Cathy McGowan, who was an independent MP representing Indi from 2013 until her retirement in 2019, endorsed Milthorpe at a launch party.

=== Other endorsements ===
Anti-abortion activist Joanna Howe endorsed Family First, One Nation, and the Nationals as first, second, and third preferences respectively after the three candidates attended a forum she organised.

== How-to-vote cards ==
Political parties recommend to voters how they should preference candidates through "how-to-vote cards" distributed by campaign volunteers near polling places. Parties often make agreements between themselves about these recommendations. Preferences were expected to play a key role in the by-election.

The Liberals recommended preferences be directed to the Nationals second, and the Nationals recommended preferences be directed to the Liberals second. On 5 March, Liberal frontbencher Andrew Bragg publicly urged his party to preference One Nation last, however the Liberals ultimately preferenced One Nation fourth.

Michelle Milthorpe did not ask voters to direct preferences, just as she did not at the previous election.

Family First said it would not give its second preferences to One Nation because of Farley's view of women.

Legalise Cannabis ran an open ticket, with no directions for further preferences beyond a number "1" for their candidate.

Candidate	How-to-vote card (read column top down)											
Candidate	LIB	Mil.	PFP	NAT	LCA	GRN	Woo.	ONP	FFP	SAP	Pap.	SFF
Raissa Butkowski (LIB)	1	—N/a	7	2	—N/a	7	—N/a	3	3	—N/a	7	10
Michelle Milthorpe (IND)	9	1	11	8	—N/a	3	—N/a	11	11	—N/a	5	11
Jamie Bonnefin (PFP)	10	—N/a	1	4	—N/a	11	—N/a	5	5	—N/a	9	6
Brad Robertson (NAT)	2	—N/a	4	1	—N/a	6	—N/a	2	2	—N/a	6	3
Aimee Lee Pearson (LCA)	11	—N/a	10	9	1	4	—N/a	8	10	—N/a	4	4
Richard August Hendrie (GRN)	12	—N/a	12	12	—N/a	1	—N/a	12	12	—N/a	2	12
Roger Woodward (IND)	3	—N/a	8	10	—N/a	9	1	9	7	—N/a	12	9
David Farley (ONP)	4	—N/a	4	5	—N/a	12	—N/a	1	4	—N/a	10	2
Rebecca Scriven (FFP)	5	—N/a	3	3	—N/a	10	—N/a	6	1	—N/a	8	5
Lucas James Ellis (SAP)	6	—N/a	5	11	—N/a	5	—N/a	7	9	1	3	7
Gary Jean Pappin (IND)	7	—N/a	9	7	—N/a	2	—N/a	10	8	—N/a	1	8
Peter Sinclair (SFF)	8	—N/a	2	6	—N/a	8	—N/a	4	5	—N/a	11	1

== Results ==
2026 Farrer by-election
Party	Candidate	Votes	%	±%
One Nation	David Farley	40,042	39.53	+32.93
Independent	Michelle Milthorpe	28,442	28.08	+8.12
Liberal	Raissa Butkowski	12,572	12.41	−31.00
National	Brad Robertson	9,901	9.78	+9.78
Legalise Cannabis	Aimee Lee Pearson	2,357	2.33	+2.33
Greens	Richard August Hendrie	2,346	2.32	−2.61
Shooters, Fishers, Farmers	Peter Sinclair	1,981	1.96	−1.51
Family First	Rebecca Scriven	1,234	1.22	−0.93
Independent	Gary Jean Pappin	790	0.78	+0.78
People First	Jamie Bonnefin	705	0.70	−1.32
Sustainable Australia	Lucas James Ellis	595	0.59	+0.59
Independent	Roger Woodward	321	0.32	+0.32
Total formal votes		101,286	93.02	+2.05
Informal votes		7,599	6.98	−2.05
Turnout		108,885	87.50	−4.06
Registered electors		124,447		
Two-candidate-preferred result
One Nation	David Farley	58,294	57.55	+57.55 (Note: In the 2025 Australian federal election, One Nation did not reach the two‑candidate‑preferred (2CP) count. This number reflects a shift from their 2025 2CP result of 0% to their result at this election.)
Independent	Michelle Milthorpe	42,992	42.45	+42.45 (Note: Michelle Milthorpe finished second in the 2025 Australian federal election to the Liberal candidate. This figure reflects that a two‑candidate‑preferred vote against One Nation was not calculated at the 2025 election.)
One Nation gain from Liberal				

Alluvial diagram demonstrating the full distribution of preferences in the seat of Farrer in the 2026 by-election. indicates at what stage the winning candidate had over 50% of the votes and was declared the winner.

== Aftermath ==
The by-election marked One Nation's first ever elected candidate in the House of Representatives, with previous MPs having defected to the party whilst sitting in Parliament. With the by-election following months of growing support for the party in opinion polling, Hanson celebrated the victory and declared that One Nation was "coming after those other seats". Milthorpe thanked her supporters, and Taylor stated that the Liberals would take "hard lessons" from the by-election.

The by-election was interpreted as demonstrating the risk One Nation poses to the Liberal and National parties. Reasons for One Nation's success in Farrer were described as including growing concerns regarding immigration and the economy, and distrust in politicians. Concerns were raised about the ability of the Coalition parties to remain electorally viable in regional areas.

In the months following the by-election, Farley began to articulate policy positions away from stated One Nation policy. In September 2026, Farley stated on Insiders that at least 100,000 additional arrivals were needed, on top of One Nation's stated maximum annual net overseas migration of 130,000 people, in order to meet demand for labour in regional areas. This comment caused condemnation from senior One Nation figures, including James Ashby and Barnaby Joyce. At that time, it was reported that Farley was struggling to develop a working relationship with Joyce, and was poised to leave One Nation.

== See also ==
- List of Australian federal by-elections
- Electoral results for the Division of Farrer
- 2026 Nepean state by-election
- 2026 South Australian state election
