= David Farley (politician) =

Australian politician (born 1957)

David Farley MP
- Farley in September 2026

Member of the Australian Parliament for Farrer
- Incumbent
- Assumed office 2 June 2026
- Preceded by: Sussan Ley

Personal details
- Born: 1957 (age 68–69) Narrandera, New South Wales, Australia
- Party: One Nation (since 2026)
- Other political affiliations: National (2015–2020)
- Children: 3
- Occupation: Politician; businessman; resource manager
- Website: davidfarleymp.com.au

David Farley (born 1957) is an Australian politician. A member of One Nation, he has been the member of Parliament (MP) for the New South Wales division of Farrer since 2026, and is the party's first elected member of the House of Representatives.

== Early life ==
David Farley was born in 1957. His grandfather was a World War I veteran of the Light Horse Brigade and his father a World War II veteran. Both have since died, being "buried … under the Australian flag."

== Business career ==
Farley was managing director and chief executive officer of the Australian Agricultural Company from December 2009 to July 2013. During his tenure, Farley backed the hiring of hundreds of Indian migrants. In 2012 he caused controversy by referring to then Prime Minister Julia Gillard as a "Non-productive old cow." He stepped down in July 2013, in a move which was described as a surprise. At the same time, he accused Barnaby Joyce of holding "xenophobic views" by opposing Chinese investment in Australian farmland.

== Politics ==
Farley was a member of the New South Wales National Party from 2015 to 2020. In 2019, he applied to fill a vacancy in the New South Wales Legislative Council, but was rejected. In 2020, he applied to join the Australian Labor Party, and filled out a form expressing interest in running as a NSW Labor candidate. His application for membership was rejected.

In 2023, Farley donated money to Voices for Farrer, and later supported the group's independent candidate Michelle Milthorpe ahead of the 2025 federal election. Milthorpe came second and was beaten by incumbent Liberal MP Sussan Ley. Ley received 56.19% of the two-candidate preferred vote, compared to Milthrope who received 43.81%. The One Nation candidate got 6.6% of first preference votes. Ley went on to become leader of the opposition after the election.

At some point after this election Farley claims to have joined the hard right One Nation party and was elected chair of an activism group called "Speak Up 4 Water."

=== 2026 Farrer by-election ===
In February 2026 the resignation of former opposition leader and Liberal MP Sussan Ley triggered a May by-election for Farrer. Farley was one of 80 candidates assessed by One Nation to be a candidate, and one of 3 put up for preselection. Farley was chosen as the One Nation candidate, becoming the first One Nation candidate chosen by a local party branch. As a result of the Labor party not contesting the election and bad polling for the Liberal and National candidates, independent Milthorpe became his main opponent.

Farley ran his campaign based in Narrandera. His campaign was focused on rural issues, particularly water and power, and centred around a promise to stop water buybacks. He also campaigned on services the effects of climate change on rural areas. The campaign was held in the context of a national polling surge for One Nation. During the campaign it was reported in 2025 he reposted 3 videos by a 22 year old OnlyFans model, he claimed it was an accident and that he did not know was OnlyFans was. Farley also provoked controversy and criticism for describing the crime in Griffith, a city in Farrer, as "hectic."

At an event in Albury on May 8 for the by-election, political advisor James Ashby ejected local Wodonga-based ABC reporters from a One Nation event. The decision was taken unilaterally by Ashby and was questioned by Hanson on the basis that they were local "regional and rural" reporters. He responded that they were "reporting back to ABC Canberra" and she stated that they "They shouldn't have gone". The ABC was later banned from all future campaign events and press conferences during the by-election. Later in the campaign, following an altercation between Liberal Senator James Paterson and a One Nation volunteer which Paterson labelled assault, Ashby claimed that Paterson had initiated the altercation by "rage baiting" the volunteer. The altercation was condemned by One Nation candidate David Farley at the time and initially apologised for by Hanson who later walked back her apology and vowed to stand by the volunteer after Ashby's comment.

After Farley's previous ties to the Labor party were revealed, which he had not disclosed, One Nation general manager Kelvin Morton referred to Farley as an "asshole" in text messages in the days before the by-election, these messages were later leaked in September.

Farley won the by-election, becoming the first One Nation candidate to be elected to the Australian House of Representatives. He was also the first member for Farrer who was not a member of the Coalition.

Farley received 39.53% of the first preference vote and 57.55% of the two-candidate-preferred vote.

=== Member of Parliament ===
After winning the Farrer by-election, it was reported Farley intended to display three flags outside of his office, the Australian, Aboriginal and Torres Strait Islander flags. This was in contrast to official One Nation policy, which supports the flying of only the Australian flag. He was reprimanded by party leader Pauline Hanson for this, and he later said on Facebook that no flag would fly above or replace the Australian flag. He declined to say if he would fly the other flags from his office, saying there were “plenty of flags for ceremonial events” and “We are one Australia, we have one flag, we unite under one flag.” He later issued a statement saying he supported the official One Nation policy on flags and would follow it.

In June 2026, he apologised for accidentally voting in favour of a proposal backed by Green and Teal MPs to cap fuel tax credits for large mining companies.

In August 2026, he was interviewed by Michelle Grattan on a podcast by for The Conversation. In the interview he described fellow One Nation MP Barnaby Joyce as a "strong mentor," he also expressed support for "sustainable data centres" and defended his decision to vote in favour allowing the use of telehealth for services related to voluntary assisted dying.

In September 2026, after comments made by Hanson in 2025 in which she referred to Aboriginal people as a "primitive race" received media attention, Farley said there is a "race in South Africa that is a lot more primitive than the Australian Aborigines [sic]", while also saying that Aboriginal people, while being a "primitive" culture at the time of colonisation, were now an "advancing culture".

=== Migration plan controversy ===
In August 2026, Farley told ABC Insiders that One Nation's net overseas migration rate would be at 130,000 with a minimum of 100,000 skilled workers as part of the existing Pacific Australia Labour Mobility scheme (PALM) scheme of rotational and short term workers, further adding that the rates were "not too different" to Labor's migration target. After this, the leader of One Nation, Pauline Hanson, firmly stated on social media that One Nation's policy was to cut rates at 130,000. One Nation MP Barnaby Joyce stated that Farley had "misspoke" and claimed that he "simply got it wrong".

The PALM scheme is an already established programme used by Labor, but it is not included in either party's net migration numbers due to workers being in the country for less than 12 months.

On 24 August, after the incident, Farley was seen walking into a private meeting of several Liberal MPs, stating that he "could see myself sitting here". Liberal MP Andrew Hastie implied that Farley could join the Liberals, saying that he was "a Nat or country Liberal, not a populist". This encounter fuelled speculations of Farley quitting One Nation to sit as an independent. One Nation MP Barnaby Joyce, who joined One Nation in 2025 after leaving the National Party, denied these claims. In this time period it was reported Farley was struggling to establish a working relationship with Joyce. In September 2026, however, Farley addressed the rumours of him defecting, saying that he never had the intention to leave One Nation.

== Political views ==
Farley is a member of One Nation, which is a right-wing to far-right party, but was previously a member of the more moderate National Party and has at other times supported centrist independents and centre-left Labor Party candidates. He was described by Liberal MP Andrew Hastie as a "Nat[ional] or country Liberal, not a populist."

=== Assisted dying ===
Farley voted in favour of a bill to allow the use of telehealth in services related to assisted dying.

=== Data centres ===
In August 2026, Farley supported the creation of data centres in Australia, but said they must be sustainable.

=== Foreign policy ===
In May 2026, Farley said the focus of the government in terms of foreign policy should be food security, due to geopolitical uncertainty and a rising Australian population.

=== Immigration ===
When Farley was CEO of the Australian Agricultural Company he supported the hiring of hundreds of Indian Migrants.

In August 2026, Farley told ABC Insiders that One Nation's net overseas migration rate would be at 130,000 with a minimum of 100,000 skilled workers as part of the existing Pacific Australia Labour Mobility scheme (PALM) scheme of rotational and short term workers, further adding that the rates were "not too different" to Labor's migration target. After this, the leader of One Nation, Pauline Hanson, firmly stated on social media that One Nation's policy was to cut rates at 130,000. One Nation MP Barnaby Joyce stated that Farley had "misspoke" and claimed that he "simply got it wrong".

=== Indigenous affairs ===
Initially, Farley stated his intention to fly the Australian, Aboriginal and Torres Strait Islander flags outside his office. He reversed this after intervention by Pauline Hanson.

In September 2026, he said that Aboriginal people were a "primitive race" when Europeans arrived but were now an "advancing culture", adding that there is a "race in South Africa that is a lot more primitive than the Australian Aborigines."

=== Water security ===
Farley's 2026 campaign was focused on water security, and he pledged to stop water buybacks. He was previously the chairman of a group called "Speak Up 4 Water".

In September 2026 he issued a motion in parliament calling for environmental water to be used to alleviate drought.

== Personal life ==
Farley is a resident of Narrandera. He has three daughters and seven grandchildren.

== Electoral history ==
2026 Farrer by-election
Party	Candidate	Votes	%	±%
One Nation	David Farley	40,042	39.53	+32.93
Independent	Michelle Milthorpe	28,442	28.08	+8.12
Liberal	Raissa Butkowski	12,572	12.41	−31.00
National	Brad Robertson	9,901	9.78	+9.78
Legalise Cannabis	Aimee Lee Pearson	2,357	2.33	+2.33
Greens	Richard August Hendrie	2,346	2.32	−2.61
Shooters, Fishers, Farmers	Peter Sinclair	1,981	1.96	−1.51
Family First	Rebecca Scriven	1,234	1.22	−0.93
Independent	Gary Jean Pappin	790	0.78	+0.78
People First	Jamie Bonnefin	705	0.70	−1.32
Sustainable Australia	Lucas James Ellis	595	0.59	+0.59
Independent	Roger Woodward	321	0.32	+0.32
Total formal votes		101,286	93.02	+2.05
Informal votes		7,599	6.98	−2.05
Turnout		108,885	87.50	−4.06
Registered electors		124,447		
Two-candidate-preferred result
One Nation	David Farley	58,294	57.55	+57.55 (Note: In the 2025 Australian federal election, One Nation did not reach the two‑candidate‑preferred (2CP) count. This number reflects a shift from their 2025 2CP result of 0% to their result at this election.)
Independent	Michelle Milthorpe	42,992	42.45	+42.45 (Note: Michelle Milthorpe finished second in the 2025 Australian federal election to the Liberal candidate. This figure reflects that a two‑candidate‑preferred vote against One Nation was not calculated at the 2025 election.)
One Nation gain from Liberal				

Alluvial diagram demonstrating the full distribution of preferences in the seat of Farrer in the 2026 by-election. indicates at what stage the winning candidate had over 50% of the votes and was declared the winner.

== Notes ==
Parliament of Australia
Preceded by Sussan Ley	Member for Farrer; 2026–present	Incumbent
