= Gerard Rennick =

Australian politician (born 1970)

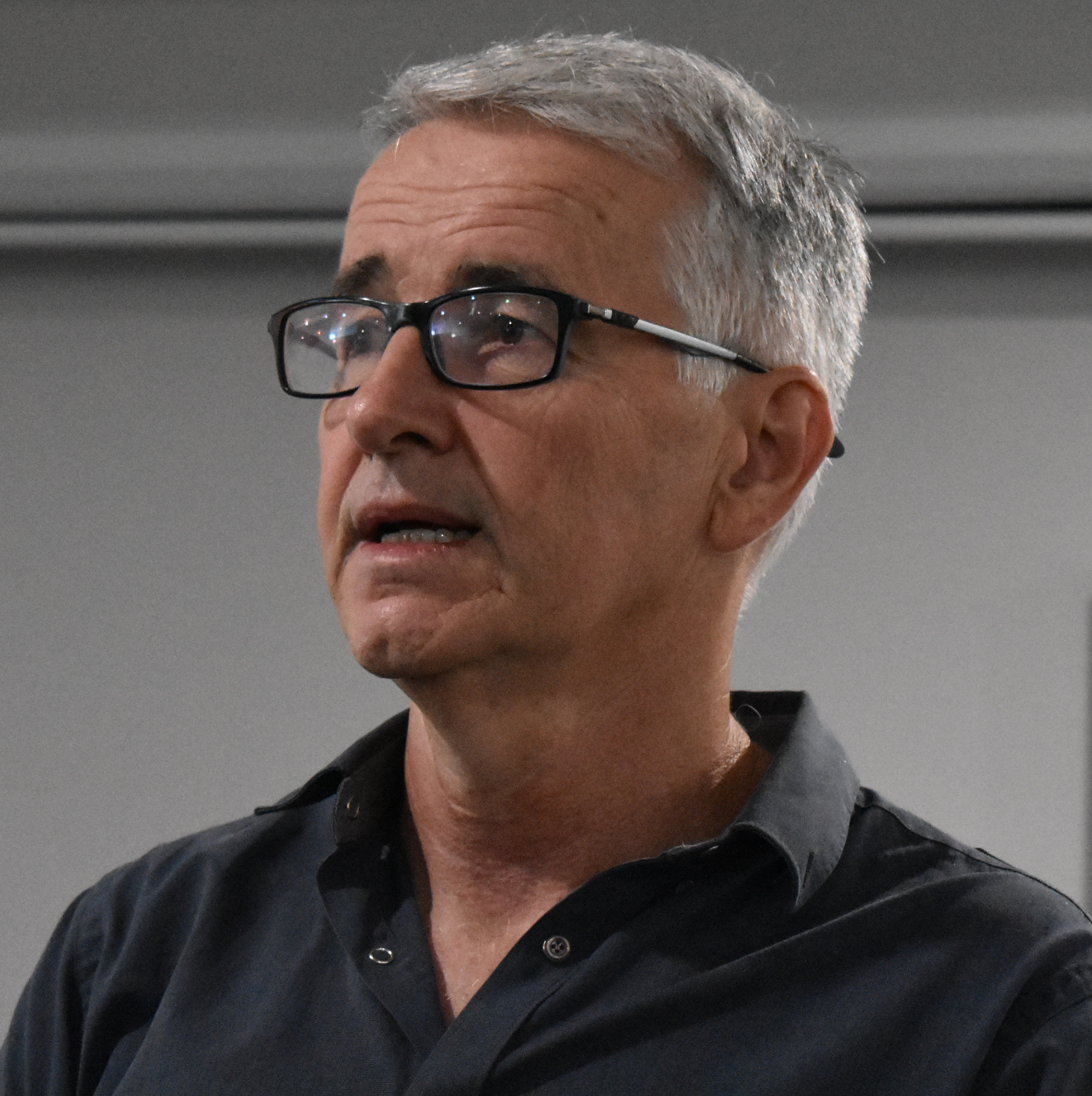
- Rennick in 2025

Leader of the People First Party
- Incumbent
- Assumed office 25 August 2024
- Preceded by: Office established

Senator for Queensland
- In office 1 July 2019 – 30 June 2025
- Succeeded by: Corinne Mulholland

Personal details
- Born: Gerard Brock Rennick; 5 November 1970 (age 56) Chinchilla, Queensland, Australia
- Party: People First (since 2024)
- Other political affiliations: Liberal National (until 2024)
- Children: 3
- Education: University of Sydney (MTax); FINSIA (MAppFin); University of Queensland (BCom)
- Website: gerardrennick.com.au

Gerard Brock Rennick (born 5 November 1970) is an Australian politician who served as a Senator for Queensland from 2019 to 2025. He was elected to the Senate at the 2019 federal election as a member of the Liberal National Party of Queensland (LNP) and sat with the Liberal Party in parliament. He resigned from the LNP in August 2024 to form the People First Party, but failed to retain his seat at the 2025 election.

== Early life ==
Rennick was born and raised on a property outside Chinchilla, on the Darling Downs. In his youth he worked as a farmhand, fruit picker, bartender and pump attendant.

He completed his education in Toowoomba at Downlands College, before moving to Brisbane, where he completed a Bachelor of Commerce degree at the University of Queensland. He also has a Master of Taxation Law from the University of Sydney, a Master of Applied Finance from the Financial Services Institute of Australasia (FINSIA), and is a graduate of the Australian Institute of Company Directors. He has 25 years’ experience in finance, both in Australia and overseas. Rennick is a Fellow of FINSIA and Fellow Certified Practicing Accountant. He is married with three children.

== Political career ==
Rennick was a Senate candidate for the LNP at the 2016 federal election, but failed to win a seat. The ABC reported that Rennick had donated $35,000 to the LNP in the year before winning the third place on the party's Senate ticket for the 2019 federal election, a position that eventually saw him elected to a six-year term. The LNP rejected as "offensive and ridiculous" any suggestion the donations played a role in his pre-selection, and highlighted the fact that some of their members self-funded their elections.

During the Morrison government, Rennick was reportedly a member of the National Right faction of the Liberal Party associated with Peter Dutton. In an interview on Sky News Australia in 2020, he spoke about government overreach in the "classroom and the bedroom" and compared it to a communist takeover by the bureaucracy. When asked to clarify, Rennick said: "there are ... groups within Australia, they are not Chinese groups, they are Australian groups, that seek to undermine our individual liberties and I think that is a greater threat to our sovereignty [than the Chinese government]".

Prior to the 2020 Queensland state election, the Guardian Australia reported that Rennick had donated to anti-abortion group, Cherish Life, which, according to abortion services provider, Marie Stopes Australia, was conducting a high-profile campaign of disinformation and "blatant lies".

On 8 July 2023 at the LNP Annual Convention in Brisbane, Rennick lost pre-selection for the third position on the LNP's senate ticket for the 2025 federal election, after being narrowly defeated by Stuart Fraser, the party's treasurer. He resigned from the LNP on 25 August 2024 and announced his intention to create a new party named 'People First'. Rennick officially began sitting as a member of the People First Party in September 2024. People First formed an alliance with Katter's Australian Party ahead of the election, and Rennick ran as the lead candidate on a joint Senate ticket in Queensland. The ticket won 4.7% of first preference votes, and Rennick lost his seat. People First finished behind Pauline Hanson's One Nation, who re-elected Senator Malcolm Roberts for a second term.

== Political positions ==
=== Climate ===
Rennick advocates climate change denial. He has promoted the conspiracy theory that the Bureau of Meteorology (BOM) is tampering with climate data to "perpetuate global warming hysteria", as part of a "global warming agenda". BOM has rejected these claims outright.

He has been viewed as a "right wing climate denialist", and was singled out by the ALP leader Anthony Albanese as someone "who thinks the Bureau of Meteorology is part of global conspiracy". Senator Murray Watt described Rennick's BOM allegations as "nuts", adding that such allegations were sourced "from right-wing think tanks". Rennick said his view was based on his experience in accounting, and had not sought a briefing from the Bureau over his concerns. He has shared misinformation from conspiracy websites, including WorldNetDaily to support his views.

Rennick proposed that the Kyoto carryover carbon credits should be used to support Australia's 2030 emissions target. Australia has been the only country in the world to attempt to use this form of emissions accounting, and was widely criticised for attempting to do so.

Rennick supports ending subsidies for renewable energy and blocking their installation on agricultural land and waterways.

Rennick claimed that without anthropogenic carbon emissions, phytoplankton would absorb so much carbon from the atmosphere that it would "destroy our plant life", a hypothesis contradicted by the Earth's past history.

=== COVID-19 ===
In 2021, The Guardian reported that federal health minister Greg Hunt had described some of Rennick's Facebook posts as containing "false information". While The Guardian did not disclose what the posts said, it described them as "casting doubt over the accuracy of PCR tests", and said that Rennick "questioned why Australia's Therapeutic Goods Administration (TGA) had not yet recommended use of ivermectin".

In November 2021, Rennick was one of five Liberal-aligned senators who voted against the government in support of the COVID-19 Vaccination Status (Prevention of Discrimination) Bill 2021, sponsored by One Nation.

In December 2021, Rennick's claims that COVID-19 vaccines amounted to "experimenting" on children, and his anti vaccine posts on Facebook, were rebutted by multiple health officials. The Chief Medical Officer of Australia, Paul Kelly, said that the Pfizer vaccine is “worthwhile, safe and effective” for children aged five to 11. Head of the TGA, John Skerritt, said: "I reject the assertion that it’s nothing much for kids and doesn’t matter if they catch [Covid]." The Australian Medical Association vice-president, Chris Moy, told The Guardian that Rennick’s surveys of adverse events were “as far away from science as possible” because they “force one answer he wants”. Since February 2024, the Australian Technical Advisory Group on Immunisation has not recommended COVID-19 vaccination for most children, excluding those children who have a medical condition that increase the risk of COVID-19. According to Daryl Cheng, an immunisation consultant to the Victorian Immunisation Program and an associate professor, this is due to COVID-19 vaccination and infection rates providing a level of herd immunity, and a lower risk of severe disease in children compared to the general population.

In February 2022, Rennick attended the Convoy to Canberra protests.

=== Superannuation ===
Rennick supports making superannuation voluntary. He has called superannuation a "cancer", saying in 2019: "Millions of dollars gets sucked out of the pockets of the battlers in the bush and sent to the blowhards in Sydney and Melbourne to manage, all for a small cost of around $37 billion a year in management fees." He said union-linked industry super funds were "laughing all the way to the bank" while no money was reinvested in regional areas. In the same speech he accused the Labor Party of selling regional Australia "down the toilet" during the Hawke-Keating era, through their globalist, privatisation agenda—selling off such government owned corporations as Qantas and the Commonwealth Bank of Australia. "Now regional Australia has to pay more for flying regionally than it costs to fly overseas ...The CBA, like every other bank in this country, became obsessed with housing rather than driving business and investment, especially in the regions."

=== Economy and tax ===
Rennick has used his background in finance to advocate tax reform. He called for profits in Australia to be taxed at the same rate as profits of foreign owned entities. He stated this could fund cuts to both payroll tax (a state based tax) and income tax. Rennick supports increasing the tax-free threshold from $18,200 to $45,000.

Rennick supports the creation of a public bank and an insurance office provided by the government. He has argued that the floating of the Australian dollar and the removal of capital controls in the 1980s "decoupled" property prices from wages.

Rennick supports public investment in manufacturing.

=== Childcare ===
He called Labor's policy of providing free childcare to all three-year-olds in Australia a conspiracy "to strengthen the role the state has in raising a child at the expense of parents". Rennick's position is that "subject to financial considerations, if we can leave children at home with at least one parent, that's something worth striving for", but he suggested that "early childhood education is ... not the best way to invest in our future".

=== Foreign relations ===
In September 2018 Rennick advocated closer ties with Russia because "they're part of the West; they drink, they're Christians, they play soccer, they're Caucasian". Rennick has called for de-escalating tensions with Vladimir Putin and Russia: "They are a genuine superpower and it's not in the world's interest to have antagonistic relations with superpowers ... There's a bigger picture here and it is world peace".

Rennick is a self-described Russophile. He raised doubts that Russia was behind the poisoning of Sergei and Yulia Skripal in the United Kingdom.

Rennick is a non-interventionist and has spoken out against regime change wars.

Rennick has said Australia should think about developing nuclear weapons to hinder aggression from China.

=== Immigration ===
Rennick has compared Australia's immigration policy to farmers who "overstock [their] paddock", and has claimed that immigration was more damaging to Australia's environment than carbon pollution. He also wanted a reduction in the number of temporary visa holders in Australia, who numbered over 2 million.

=== Other positions ===
Rennick has been a long-term advocate of reforming the federation, of the government building and retaining profit making infrastructure such as dams, ports and electricity power plants, of sustainable immigration to ensure quality of life for all Australians, for higher taxes on profits sent offshore, and for universities to underwrite the costs of education.

Rennick opposed the closing of maternity wards by the state government in regional Queensland and has called on the state government to improve maternity health outcomes.

Rennick is opposed to the adoption of poker machines in the state of Queensland, and consequently accused the Labor state government of being "utterly incompetent and morally corrupt".

He has spoken about having a constitutional convention to clearly define and separate the responsibilities of the Federal and State Governments in the federation: "It is time for COAG to hold a constitutional convention to clearly define and separate these responsibilities with proposed changes put to a referendum."
