= Division of Farrer =

Australian federal electoral division

Coordinates: 32.501°S 143.311°E

Farrer Australian House of Representatives Division
- Map of electorate boundaries from the 2025 federal election
- Created: 1949
- MP: David Farley
- Party: One Nation
- Namesake: William Farrer
- Electors: 128,630 (2025)
- Area: 126,563 km^{2} (48,866.2 sq mi)
- Demographic: Rural
Electorates around Farrer:
| Grey (SA) | Parkes | Parkes |
| Barker (SA) | Farrer | Riverina |
| Mallee (Vic) | Nicholls (VIC) | Indi (Vic) |

The Division of Farrer is an Australian electoral division in the state of New South Wales. Located in the southwestern part of the state bordering both South Australia and Victoria, at 126,563 km^{2} (48,866.2 sq mi) it is the second-largest division by land area in the state after the neighbouring Division of Parkes. It includes the cities of Albury and Griffith, and has always included Albury since the creation of the division in 1949.

Following the 2026 Farrer by election, the electorate is represented by One Nation’s David Farley, the first member of the party to be elected to the House of Representatives.

== History ==
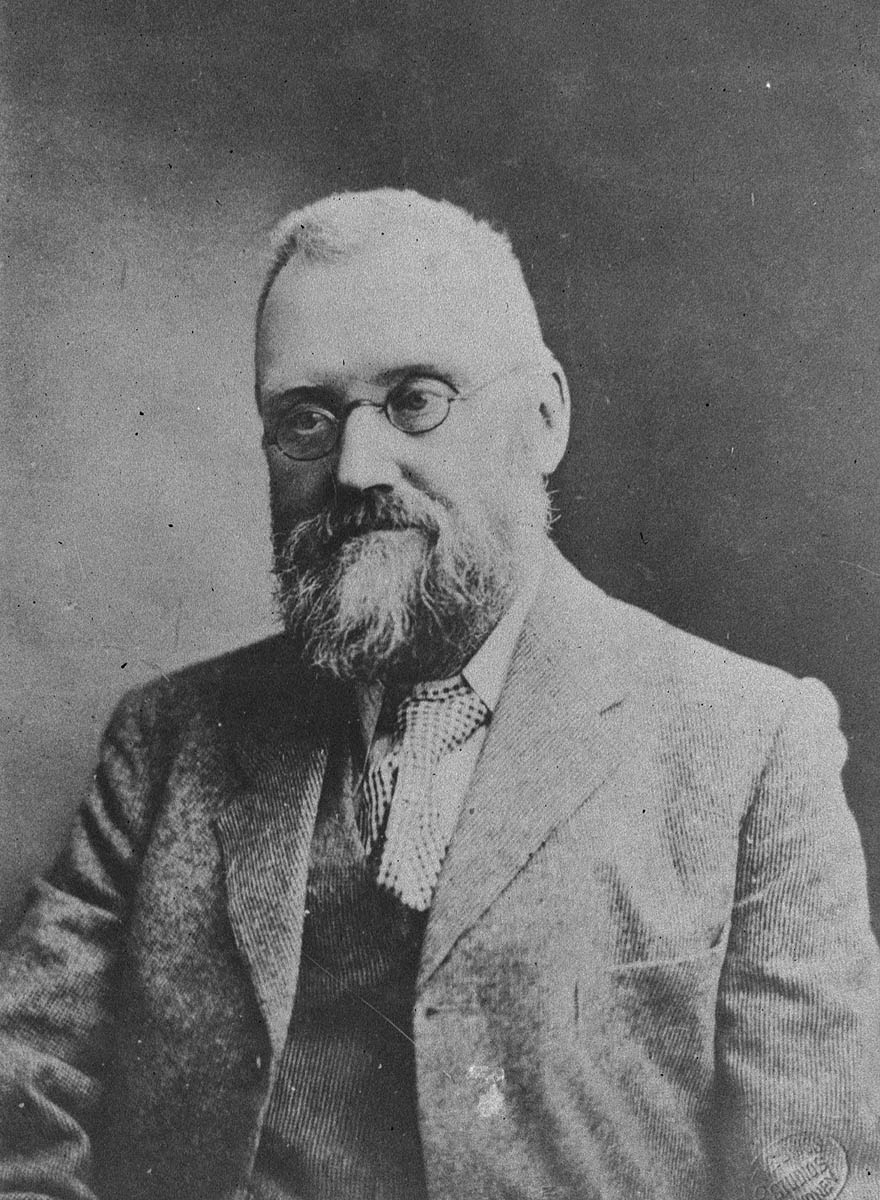
William Farrer, the division's namesake

The division was created in 1949 and is named for William Farrer, an agricultural scientist.

It has always been a safe non-Labor seat, alternating between the Liberal Party and the National Party. All four of its members have gone on to serve in cabinet, most notably Tim Fischer, leader of the National Party from 1990 to 1999 and Deputy Prime Minister from 1996 to 1999 during the first half of the Howard government.

Fischer's predecessor, Wal Fife, transferred to the Division of Hume in 1984 after Farrer ceded Wagga Wagga to Hume in a redistribution.

The member from 2001 until 2026 was Sussan Ley, a member of the Liberal Party and that party's deputy leader from 2022 to 2025, and leader from 2025 to 2026. She resigned in February 2026 after losing a leadership spill.

David Farley of One Nation won the resulting by-election in May 2026, the party's first elected member in the House of Representatives.

== Boundaries ==
Since 1984, federal electoral division boundaries in Australia have been determined at redistributions by a redistribution committee appointed by the Australian Electoral Commission. Redistributions occur for the boundaries of divisions in a particular state, and they occur every seven years, or sooner if a state's representation entitlement changes or when divisions of a state are malapportioned.

When the division was first created in 1949, it covered areas that were previously part of the Division of Hume, such as Wagga Wagga and Albury. It lost Wagga Wagga to Hume in 1984, but significantly expanded westwards to the South Australian border. The expansion replaced the southern portion of the Division of Riverina which was renamed Division of Riverina-Darling that year. Since then, the division has always covered the south-west corner of the state, the MacCabe Corner.

Farrer gained the Far West, including Broken Hill from the Division of Parkes in the 2006 redistribution. The gain also included the north-west corner of the state, the Cameron Corner. Much of this gain was reverted in the 2016 redistribution, ceding the area back to Parkes. At the same time Farrer absorbed the Murrumbidgee Irrigation Area, including Griffith and Leeton from Riverina. There were no changes to the boundaries in the subsequent 2024 redistribution.

Since 2016, the division is located in the far south-western area of the state, and covers the entirety of the local government areas of City of Albury, Balranald Shire, Berrigan Shire, Carrathool Shire, Edward River, Federation Council, Greater Hume Shire, City of Griffith, Hay Shire, Leeton Shire, Murray River Council, Murrumbidgee Council, Narrandera Shire and Wentworth Shire. These include the cities or towns of Albury, Corowa, Narrandera, Leeton, Griffith, Deniliquin, Hay, Balranald and Wentworth. The division has covered Albury throughout its existence.

| Redistribution | Map | Interactive | Elections | Notes |
|---|---|---|---|---|
| 1949; 11 May | | | 1949; 1951; 1954 | Division created. |
| 1955; 30 August | | | 1955; 1958; 1961; 1963; 1966 | |
| 1968; 21 November | | | 1969; 1972; 1974; 1975 | |
| 1977; 1 November | | | 1977; 1980; 1983 | |
| 1984; 11 October | | | 1984; 1987; 1990 | |
| 1992; 31 January | | | 1993; 1996; 1998 | |
| 2000; 31 January | | | 2001; 2004 | |
| 2006 | | | 2007 | |
| 2009 | | | 2010; 2013 | |
| 2016; 25 February | | | 2016; 2019; 2022 | |
| 2024; 10 October | | | 2025; 2026 | No change. |

== Members ==
| Image | Member | Party | Term | Notes |
|---|---|---|---|---|
| | David Fairbairn (1917–1994) | Liberal | 10 December 1949 – 11 November 1975 | Served as minister under Menzies, Holt, McEwen, Gorton and McMahon. Retired |
| | Wal Fife (1929–2017) | Liberal | 13 December 1975 – 1 December 1984 | Previously held the New South Wales Legislative Assembly seat of Wagga Wagga. Served as minister under Fraser. Transferred to the Division of Hume |
| | Tim Fischer (1946–2019) | Nationals | 1 December 1984 – 8 October 2001 | Previously held the New South Wales Legislative Assembly seat of Murray. Served as minister and Deputy Prime Minister under Howard. Retired |
| | Sussan Ley (1961–) | Liberal | 10 November 2001 – 27 February 2026 | Served as minister under Abbott, Turnbull and Morrison. Served as Opposition Leader from 2025 to 2026. Resigned to retire from politics |
| | David Farley (1957–) | One Nation | 9 May 2026 – present | Incumbent |

== Election results ==
2026 Farrer by-election
| Party | Candidate | Votes | % | ±% |
|---|---|---|---|---|
| One Nation | David Farley | 40,042 | 39.53 | +32.93 |
| Independent | Michelle Milthorpe | 28,442 | 28.08 | +8.12 |
| Liberal | Raissa Butkowski | 12,572 | 12.41 | −31.00 |
| National | Brad Robertson | 9,901 | 9.78 | +9.78 |
| Legalise Cannabis | Aimee Lee Pearson | 2,357 | 2.33 | +2.33 |
| Greens | Richard August Hendrie | 2,346 | 2.32 | −2.61 |
| Shooters, Fishers, Farmers | Peter Sinclair | 1,981 | 1.96 | −1.51 |
| Family First | Rebecca Scriven | 1,234 | 1.22 | −0.93 |
| Independent | Gary Jean Pappin | 790 | 0.78 | +0.78 |
| People First | Jamie Bonnefin | 705 | 0.70 | −1.32 |
| Sustainable Australia | Lucas James Ellis | 595 | 0.59 | +0.59 |
| Independent | Roger Woodward | 321 | 0.32 | +0.32 |
| Total formal votes | | 101,286 | 93.02 | +2.05 |
| Informal votes | | 7,599 | 6.98 | −2.05 |
| Turnout | | 108,885 | 87.50 | −4.06 |
| Registered electors | | 124,447 | | |
Two-candidate-preferred result
| One Nation | David Farley | 58,294 | 57.55 | +57.55 (Note: In the 2025 Australian federal election, One Nation did not reach the two‑candidate‑preferred (2CP) count. This number reflects a shift from their 2025 2CP result of 0% to their result at this election.) |
| Independent | Michelle Milthorpe | 42,992 | 42.45 | +42.45 (Note: Michelle Milthorpe finished second in the 2025 Australian federal election to the Liberal candidate. This figure reflects that a two‑candidate‑preferred vote against One Nation was not calculated at the 2025 election.) |
| One Nation gain from Liberal | | | | |

Alluvial diagram demonstrating the full distribution of preferences in the seat of Farrer in the 2026 by-election. indicates at what stage the winning candidate had over 50% of the votes and was declared the winner.
