= Centre for Public Integrity (Australia) =

Australian think tank

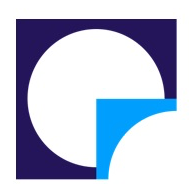
- Established: 2019
- Focus: Corruption; Accountability institutions
- Chair: Anthony Whealy
- Location: Melbourne, Australia
- Website: publicintegrity.org.au

The Centre for Public Integrity (CPI) is an Australian non-profit public policy think tank. The Centre for Public Integrity advocates against corruption, and for reining in executive power and changes to Australia's political finance system. The Centre collaborates with academics, legal practitioners and retired judges to conduct research on integrity reform in Australia.

== History ==
The Centre for Public Integrity (CPI) was founded in 2019 by a group of former judges, lawyers, and integrity experts, headed by former New South Wales Court of Appeal judge Anthony Whealy. The centre aimed to advocate for the establishment of a strong federal anti-corruption body and the reform of laws governing donations and lobbying, as well as protecting legitimate media and other institutions that hold other accountable. On 17 July 2019 it launched the Integrity Reform Agenda at New South Wales Parliament House.

== Governance and funding ==
The Centre for Public Integrity is a registered research institute and charity, funded by philanthropic foundations and public donations. Donations from political parties, unions, religious organisations, or other entities "whose values do not align with our mission" are not accepted. Board members and the experts consulted perform their work for free. The Myer Foundation is one of its major donors.

As of July 2026 the Centre's board of directors is chaired by Anthony Whealy. Members of the Board include George Williams, Allen Fels, Margaret White, Michael Barker, Emma Maple-Brown, Joo Cheong Tham, and Geoffrey Watson SC. Catherine Williams is executive director.

The eminent former jurist Stephen Charles served on the board until his death in June 2025.

== Mission and research ==
The CPI states that it is "an independent research institute dedicated to restoring integrity to the foundations of Australia's democracy" that "work[s] to prevent corruption, protect the integrity of our accountability institutions, rein in executive power, and eliminate the undue influence of big money in politics".

The Centre for Public Integrity's research agenda focuses on accountability institutions, the use of executive power in the Australian government, Australia's political finance system, the establishment of a national integrity commission, and pork barrelling.

== Activities ==
In 2023, the centre undertook analysis that found that multinational consulting firms PwC, Deloitte, KPMG, and Ernst & Young had donated A$4.3m to Labor and the Coalition parties over the previous ten years, during which their government contracts increased by 400% in value.

In April 2025, it collaborated with The Australia Institute, the Australian Democracy Network, and Transparency International Australia to determine six key changes to address unfairness in the new federal political finance regulations.

In November 2025, it was announced that South Australia would be using work done by the Centre for Public Integrity and the South Australian ICAC to revise lobbying rules in the state.

In February 2026, it published a report titled "Lawmaking with Integrity", which highlighted significant concerns regarding the creation of legislation in Australia, and proposed four "integrity safeguards" that should be introduced by Parliament. In April 2026, the CPI published a document entitled "Protecting Integrity", in which it outlined that the independence of organisations that monitor government depends on "three key levers: funding, appointments, and oversight". In May 2026, the Centre, along with independent senator David Pocock, criticised the funding allocation for the Australian National Audit Office, which independently audits the work of government departments, in the Albanese government's budget.

In July 2026, Anthony Whealy analysed expenditure on political campaigning by South Australian anti-abortion activist Joanna Howe, and said that Howe appeared to have broken the state's law requiring that individuals or organisations who receive donations of over $1000 or spend over $5,000 on political campaigning during the official reporting period are required to declare that money.
