= Stephen Charles =

Australian judge (1937–2025)

The Honourable Stephen Charles AO
- Born: Stephen Pendrill Charles; 21 July 1937
- Died: 13 June 2025 (aged 87)
- Occupation: Judge
- Known for: Judge of Supreme Court of Victoria Court of Appeal (1995-2006)

The Honourable Stephen Pendrill Charles AO (21 July 1937 – 13 June 2025) was an Australian jurist who served on the Supreme Court of Victoria Court of Appeal between 1995 and 2006.

== Early life and education ==
Stephen Pendrill Charles was born on 21 July 1937.

== Career ==
=== Judge ===
Charles served on the Supreme Court of Victoria Court of Appeal between 1995 and 2006.

=== Other roles ===
Charles was director of the Accountability Round Table from 2013 until 2024, which focused on government accountability. He also worked for the Centre for Public Policy, he was a key player in the establishment of the Broad-based Anticorruption Commission in Victoria as well as the National Anti-Corruption Commission.

Charles was on the board of the Australian Centre for Public Integrity, founded in 2019.

=== Writings ===
With Catherine Williams he co-wrote Keeping Them Honest, published in 2022 by Scribe. The book was longlisted for the inaugural Australian Political Book of the Year in the same year.

In 2024, he co-wrote, with his daughter Lucy Hamilton, an essay in Meanjin titled "The Year in Truth-telling", which included his thoughts on the Indigenous Voice to Parliament.

He died on 13 June 2025.

== Honours ==
In 2017 Charles was appointed an Officer of the Order of Australia for distinguished service to the law and to the judiciary, particularly in the areas of commercial arbitration and mediation, to judicial administration, and to legal professional organisations.
