= Joanna Howe =

Australian activist and legal academic (born 1983)

- Born: 28 March 1983 (age 43)
- Education: University of Sydney (BEc, LLB (Hons)); University of Oxford (MSt, DPhil)
- Occupation: Professor of law
- Employer: University of Adelaide
- Known for: Anti-abortion activism
- Spouse: James Howe
- Children: 5
- Honours: Rhodes Scholar; University of Adelaide Vice-Chancellor's Award for Women's Excellence in Research; Executive Dean's Award for Excellence in Teaching and Learning
- Website: drjoannahowe.com.au

Joanna Howe (born 28 March 1983) is an Australian anti-abortion activist and professor of law at Adelaide University. An expert in temporary labour migration and an Oxford graduate, Howe is most notable for her campaigning and advocacy against abortion, including supporting legislative proposals in South Australia by Ben Hood and Sarah Game to restrict late-term abortions, in 2024 and 2025 respectively. Both proposals failed to pass the Parliament of South Australia.

== Early life and education ==
Joanna Howe was born on 28 March 1983.

After graduating with a Bachelor of Economics (2001–2003) and Law with First Class Honours (2001–2007) at the University of Sydney, Howe undertook a one-year M.St. Legal Research at Oxford University in England. Between 2009 and 2012 she undertook a doctorate of philosophy in law at Oxford, having been awarded a Rhodes Scholarship in New South Wales.

She is a first-generation immigrant to Australia, having migrated from India. She has referred to South Australia as her "home state".

== Career ==
Howe has a PhD in Law from Oxford University where she studied as a Rhodes Scholar.

Around 2003, Howe was employed with the Australian Workers' Union in Melbourne, Victoria. (Note: Not sure how this fits with studying at the University of Sydney - possibly after graduating and before the LLB?) She has also worked as a consultant for the International Labour Organization, The McKell Institute, and the former Equal Opportunity for Women in the Workplace Agency. (Note: Some time before the passing of the Workplace Gender Equality Act 2012, when the agency was superseded by the Workplace Gender Equality Agency.)

In 2010–2011 Howe was employed as a junior dean at St John's College, University of Cambridge, England. In 2012 she was appointed as a lecturer at the University of Adelaide (now Adelaide University) in Adelaide, South Australia. In 2015 she became a senior lecturer, and the following year, associate professor of law. In 2023, she was appointed professor of law at the university.

Howe is an expert in the field of temporary labour migration. She led a report by the University of Adelaide on exploitation in the horticulture industry published in March 2019, and participated in an International Labour Organization scholars' workshop on temporary labour migration in November 2019. Along with Martin Parkinson and John Azarias, Howe conducted an inquiry into the immigration system, which was commissioned by Clare O'Neil, the Home Affairs minister, in November 2022. The report was released in April 2023, and stated that Australia's migration system would require major reform, and advised that a rise in "permanently temporary" migration be curbed.

Howe filed an application with the Fair Work Commission in June 2024 against the University of Adelaide, seeking an order for the dismissal of complaints against her research on abortion and prostitution on academic freedom grounds.

As of May 2026 she is a professor of law at the University of Adelaide.

== Anti-abortion activism ==
Howe has been an activist in the anti-abortion movement in Australia. She formerly held pro-choice views; however, after being challenged by a friend in her 20s on the subject, her personal readings and research led her to a pro-life position.

Howe was involved in the July 2022 formation of the Enid Lyons List, an anti-abortion group which aims to elect young women to political office.

She worked on and supported a bill by South Australian Liberal MP Ben Hood that would have required those seeking an abortion after 28 weeks of pregnancy to undergo induced labour. The bill failed to pass in the Legislative Council, with MPs in October 2024 voting ten to nine against it. A pairing agreement between Michelle Lensink, who opposed the bill, and Jing Lee, who supported it, was terminated by Lee on the night of the vote, with Dennis Hood agreeing to pair Lensink at the last minute. Howe had lobbied Lee to terminate the pair agreement. Howe subsequently made social media posts describing seven politicians and advocates, all women who had opposed the bill, (Note: The seven women listed were deputy premier Susan Close, minister Katrine Hildyard, former Attorney-General Vickie Chapman, SA Best MP Connie Bonaros, then-Greens MP Tammy Franks, and academics Barbara Baird and Katina D'Onise.) as "baby-killers". Terry Stephens, president of the Legislative Council, banned Howe from attending the chamber after the bill's failure, stating that members had witnessed Howe using "threatening and intimidating tactics". Howe denied allegations made against her.

In a May 2025 parliamentary debate on a proposal by New South Wales Greens MLC Amanda Cohn to expand access to abortion, Liberal leader Mark Speakman stated that Howe had emailed him, promising to lead a public campaign calling for his removal as leader if he supported the bill. A number of state and federal MPs also reported having received abusive messages after being targeted by Howe on social media.

In September 2025, Howe assisted independent MP Sarah Game to draft a bill to restrict abortions after 23 weeks; this was defeated in November 2025 by a vote of eleven to eight in the Legislative Council. Lee, who had previously voted for the previous proposal restricting abortion, voted against this bill. In the month leading up to the vote on the Game proposal, Howe spent A$95,976 on advertising through Meta, making her the third-largest spender in Australia on Meta advertising, behind UNICEF and Greenpeace Australia Pacific. She also hosted a fund-raising game on her website, encouraging followers to buy words and phrases that she described as "the cliched, predictable and evil language used by pro-abortion politicians". Prizes including cash vouchers and dinner with Howe and her husband. Kyam Maher, the Attorney-General of South Australia, stated that he would refer the game to Consumer and Business Services, citing concerns with lottery regulation compliance.

In the lead-up to a rally planned for Sydney on 2 June 2026, at which One Nation MP Barnaby Joyce was scheduled to speak, Howe posted an image which she referred to as "twin babies Emma and Ruth", identified by experts as not human foetuses, but those of marsupials. The Guardian reported that a person claimed they had given this information to Howe as a hoax, to see if she would fact-check it. Howe responded in a TikTok video on 12 June, criticising Queensland Labor MP Nikki Boyd for calling her "manipulative".

Howe has been described as adversarial both in person and online, where she has focused on digital mobilisation like petitions and emails, and she herself wrote "I'm not your nice pro-life Christian girl". Opinion pieces in The Catholic Weekly have defended Howe.

== Politics ==
Howe was previously a member of the South Australian Labor Party, but was expelled after lobbying for One Nation at the March 2026 state election. In July 2026 it was revealed that Howe had spent nearly A$34,000 on campaigns aimed specifically at voters and MPs in the election (out of a total of over A$219,000 on her various campaigns), but had declared nil expenditure to the Electoral Commission of South Australia. Anthony Whealy, who chairs the Centre for Public Integrity, said that Howe appeared to have broken the South Australian law, which requires that individuals or organisations who spend over $5,000 on political campaigning during the official reporting period (in this case 9 months) are required to declare that money.

== Other activities ==
From 2015, Howe has been on the board of the Christian organisation Youth Mission Team Australia, (Note: YMT is a Christian organisation for young people, which recruits year 12 graduates to volunteer as full-time youth ministers in schools and parishes for one year following graduating from high school.) and has served on the Research Committee of Women's Forum Australia.

In 2017, she was on the management committee of the Working Women's Centre. From 2021 and ongoing, she has been a member of Ministerial Advisory Council on Skilled Migration, under the Minister for Immigration and Citizenship.

She has authored several books as well as many journal articles.

In September 2026, Howe's husband James said in a video on her YouTube channel that "I don't do consent", and "we don’t do consent, I do marriage man". Thes comments were widely criticised, including by South Australian attorney-general Kyam Maher. In response, Howe has threatened to sue Maher for defamation, and her husband has stated that claims he supports marital rape are false.

== Recognition and awards ==
- 2015: University of Adelaide Vice-Chancellor's Award for Women's Excellence in Research (a research award worth A$5000)
- 2015: Executive Dean's Award for Excellence in Teaching and Learning, University of Adelaide
- 2022: Listed in InDaily's "40 under 40"

== Personal life ==
Howe is married to James and as of 2025 has five children.

She is a practising Catholic.

== See also ==
- Abortion in Australia
