= Carryover credits =

Carbon accounting measure

Carryover Credits (Kyoto carryover credits) are a carbon accounting measure by which nations count historical emission reductions that exceeded previous international goals towards its current targets. In essence, carryover credits represent the volume of emissions a country could have released, but did not. When used in reference to the Paris Agreement, it refers to a scheme under which unspent "Clean Development Mechanism credits" (CDM credits) introduced by the Kyoto Protocol will be "carried over" to the new markets established by the agreement. As part of the Paris Agreement, CDM credits will be replaced by an international emissions trading market, whereby countries can sell their excess emissions credits to other countries. While most countries do not count their credits, several countries led by Australia, including Brazil, India, and Ukraine are attempting to allow their credits to be carried over. The proposal has been criticized, with scientists estimating that if countries were to make full use of their excess credits global temperatures could rise by an extra 0.1 °C. In addition countries could use their excess credits to flood the market and greatly reduce the price of credits.
