= Sussan Ley =

Australian retired politician (born 1961)

The Honourable Sussan Ley
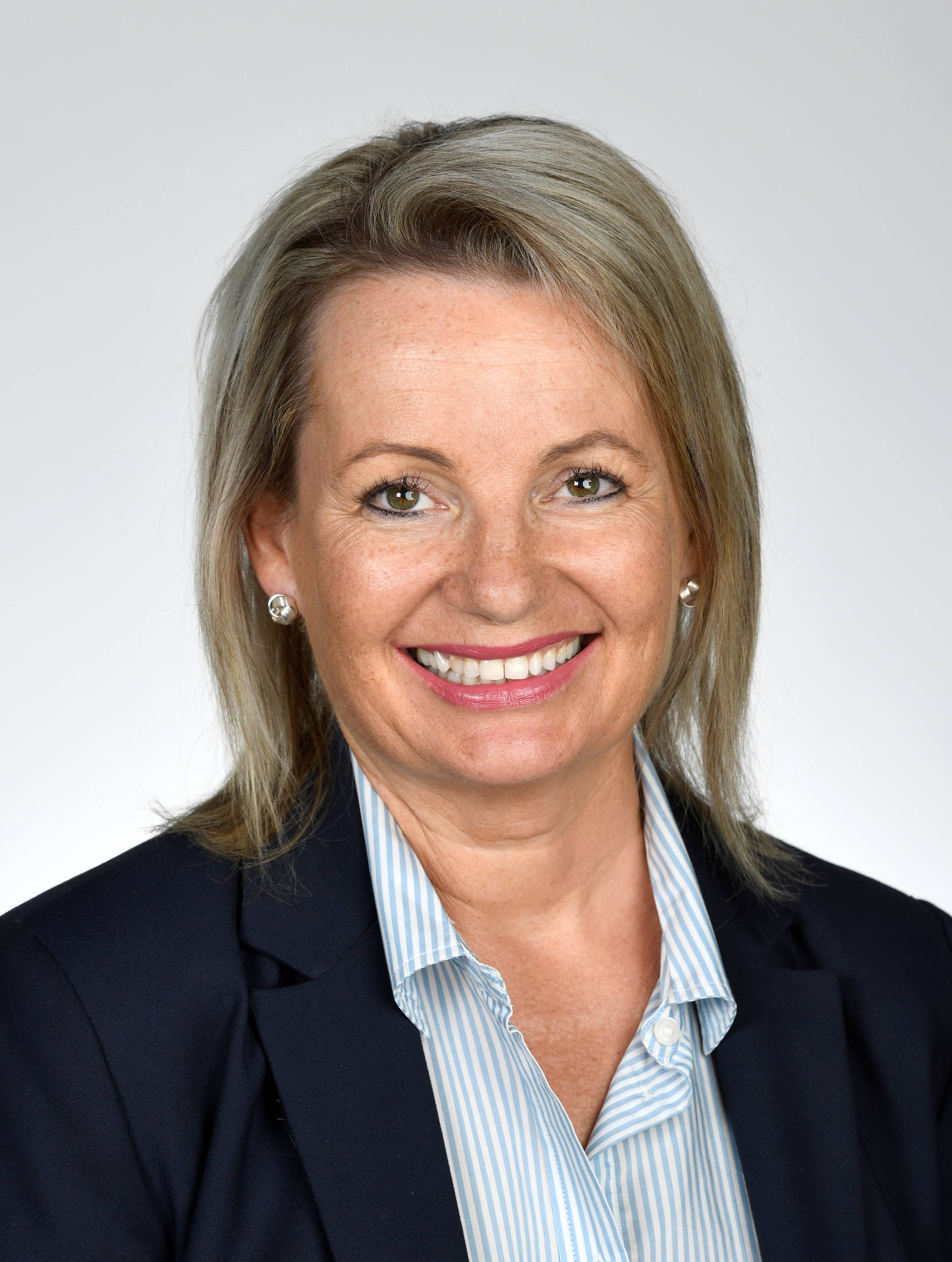
- Official portrait, 2019

Leader of the Opposition
- In office 13 May 2025 – 13 February 2026
- Prime Minister: Anthony Albanese
- Deputy: Ted O'Brien
- Preceded by: Peter Dutton
- Succeeded by: Angus Taylor

16th Leader of the Liberal Party
- In office 5 May 2025 (Note: Acting: 5–13 May 2025) – 13 February 2026
- Deputy: Ted O'Brien
- Preceded by: Peter Dutton
- Succeeded by: Angus Taylor
Previous offices 2013–2025
Deputy Leader of the Opposition
In office 5 June 2022 – 13 May 2025
Leader	Peter Dutton
Preceded by	Richard Marles
Succeeded by	Ted O'Brien
Deputy Leader of the Liberal Party
In office 30 May 2022 – 13 May 2025
Leader	Peter Dutton; Herself (acting)
Preceded by	Josh Frydenberg
Succeeded by	Ted O'Brien
Minister for the Environment
In office 29 May 2019 – 23 May 2022
Prime Minister	Scott Morrison
Preceded by	Melissa Price
Succeeded by	Tanya Plibersek (Note: As Minister for the Environment and Water)
Assistant Minister for Regional Development and Territories
In office 26 August 2018 – 26 May 2019
Prime Minister	Scott Morrison
Preceded by	Office established
Succeeded by	Nola Marino
Minister for Aged Care
In office 30 September 2015 – 13 January 2017
Prime Minister	Malcolm Turnbull
Preceded by	Christian Porter
Succeeded by	Ken Wyatt (Note: As Assistant Minister for Health and Minister for Indigenous Health and Aged Care)
Minister for Sport
In office 23 December 2014 – 13 January 2017
Prime Minister	Tony Abbott; Malcolm Turnbull
Preceded by	Peter Dutton
Succeeded by	Greg Hunt
Minister for Health
In office 23 December 2014 – 13 January 2017
Prime Minister	Tony Abbott; Malcolm Turnbull
Preceded by	Peter Dutton
Succeeded by	Greg Hunt
Assistant Minister for Education
In office 18 September 2013 – 23 December 2014
Prime Minister	Tony Abbott
Preceded by	Kate Ellis
Succeeded by	Simon Birmingham

Member of the Australian Parliament for Farrer
- In office 10 November 2001 – 27 February 2026
- Preceded by: Tim Fischer
- Succeeded by: David Farley

Personal details
- Born: Susan Penelope Braybrooks; 14 December 1961 (age 64) Kano, Nigeria
- Party: Liberal
- Other political affiliations: Coalition
- Spouse: John Ley (m. 1987; div. 2004)
- Children: 3
- Education: La Trobe University; University of New South Wales; Charles Sturt University
- Occupation: Aircraft pilot, taxation officer
- Website: sussanley.com

Sussan Penelope Ley (Note: Pronounced /suːzən liː/, SOO-zən LEE) (née Braybrooks; born 14 December 1961) is a retired Australian politician who served as the leader of the Opposition from 2025 to 2026, holding office as the 16th leader of the Liberal Party. She was the member of Parliament (MP) for the New South Wales division of Farrer from 2001 to 2026, and served as a minister in the Abbott, Turnbull, and Morrison governments.

Born into an English family in Nigeria, Ley grew up in the Trucial States (now the United Arab Emirates) and England, before moving to Australia as a teenager. Prior to entering politics, she worked as a commercial pilot, farmer and public servant based in Albury. She was elected to the House of Representatives at the 2001 federal election, winning the regional New South Wales seat of Farrer. Ley was appointed parliamentary secretary by John Howard in 2004, serving until the Coalition's defeat at the 2007 election. After the election, she held positions in the Nelson, Turnbull, and Abbott shadow ministries.

After the Liberal–National Coalition's victory at the 2013 election, Ley was appointed Assistant Minister for Education by Tony Abbott, later joining the cabinet in 2014 as Minister for Health and Minister for Sport. She continued to serve in the cabinet until January 2017, resigning amid a scandal regarding her travel expenses. She would return to the ministry in August 2018 after Scott Morrison succeeded Malcolm Turnbull as prime minister, becoming an assistant minister and later returning to cabinet in 2019 as Minister for the Environment, remaining in this position until the Coalition's defeat at the 2022 election.

Ley was elected unopposed as deputy leader of the Liberal Party under Peter Dutton after the 2022 defeat. After Dutton lost his seat in the Coalition's landslide defeat at the 2025 election, she was elected Liberal leader at a leadership election, becoming leader of the Opposition as the first woman in Australian history to hold either position. In her tenth month as leader in 2026, she was ousted by Angus Taylor in a leadership spill; she subsequently retired from politics, triggering a by-election in her seat of Farrer.

During her tenure as leader of the Liberal Party, Ley presided over unprecedented political conflicts, including two dissolutions of the Liberal–National Coalition within a year—the first such instances since 1987, historically low polling results for both the Liberal Party and the broader Coalition, and the Opposition's response to the legislative changes introduced by the Albanese government following the Bondi Beach shooting including gun law reform, strengthening of hate speech and antisemitism laws, and immigration measures.

== Early life and education ==
Susan Penelope Braybrooks was born the daughter of English parents, Edgar Hosken Braybrooks and Angela Mary Braybrooks (née Weston), on 14 December 1961 in Kano, Northern Region, Federation of Nigeria. Her family moved to the Trucial States (United Arab Emirates) when she was one year old, where her father worked as a British intelligence officer. They lived first in Qatar, then Sharjah, Dubai, Abu Dhabi, and lastly Al Ain. Her father worked with the sheikhs who ruled the states at that time. Ley attended boarding school in England until she was 13 years old, when her family migrated to Australia.

Ley's parents purchased a hobby farm in Toowoomba, Queensland, but quickly sold it due to a crash in beef prices. They then moved to Canberra, where her father worked for the Australian Federal Police (AFP). Ley attended Campbell High School and Dickson College in Canberra for her secondary schooling. Ley initially said she changed her name from Susan to Sussan after reading about numerology some time after leaving school, although in a 2025 interview she said that, as a rebellious teenager, she added the extra "s" to annoy her family.

After marrying and settling on her husband's family farm outside Tallangatta in north-east Victoria and having three children, Ley started studying economics part-time at La Trobe University. She then became employed at the Australian Taxation Office at Albury as director of technical training from 1995 to 2001. While working there, she did a master's degree in tax law, and, in 2000, a master of accountancy at Charles Sturt University. Her grandfather was a Church of England minister in England and she attended an Anglican church in Albury. She has also worked as a commercial pilot and shearers' cook.

== Political career ==
Ley joined the Liberal Party's Tallangatta branch in 1994. She was elected to the House of Representatives at the 2001 election, winning the New South Wales seat of Farrer for the Liberal Party following the retirement of former National Party leader and deputy prime minister Tim Fischer, beating the Nationals candidate by 206 votes. At the time of her election she was living across the border in Old Tallangatta, Victoria, and had recently lost Liberal preselection for the Victorian seat of Indi to Sophie Mirabella. She campaigned in "a large caravan, brightly painted in Liberal blue".

=== Howard government (2001–2007) ===
In the Howard government, Ley was appointed Parliamentary Secretary (Children and Youth Affairs) in October 2004 and Parliamentary Secretary for Agriculture, Fisheries and Forestry in January 2006.

=== Opposition (2007–2013) ===
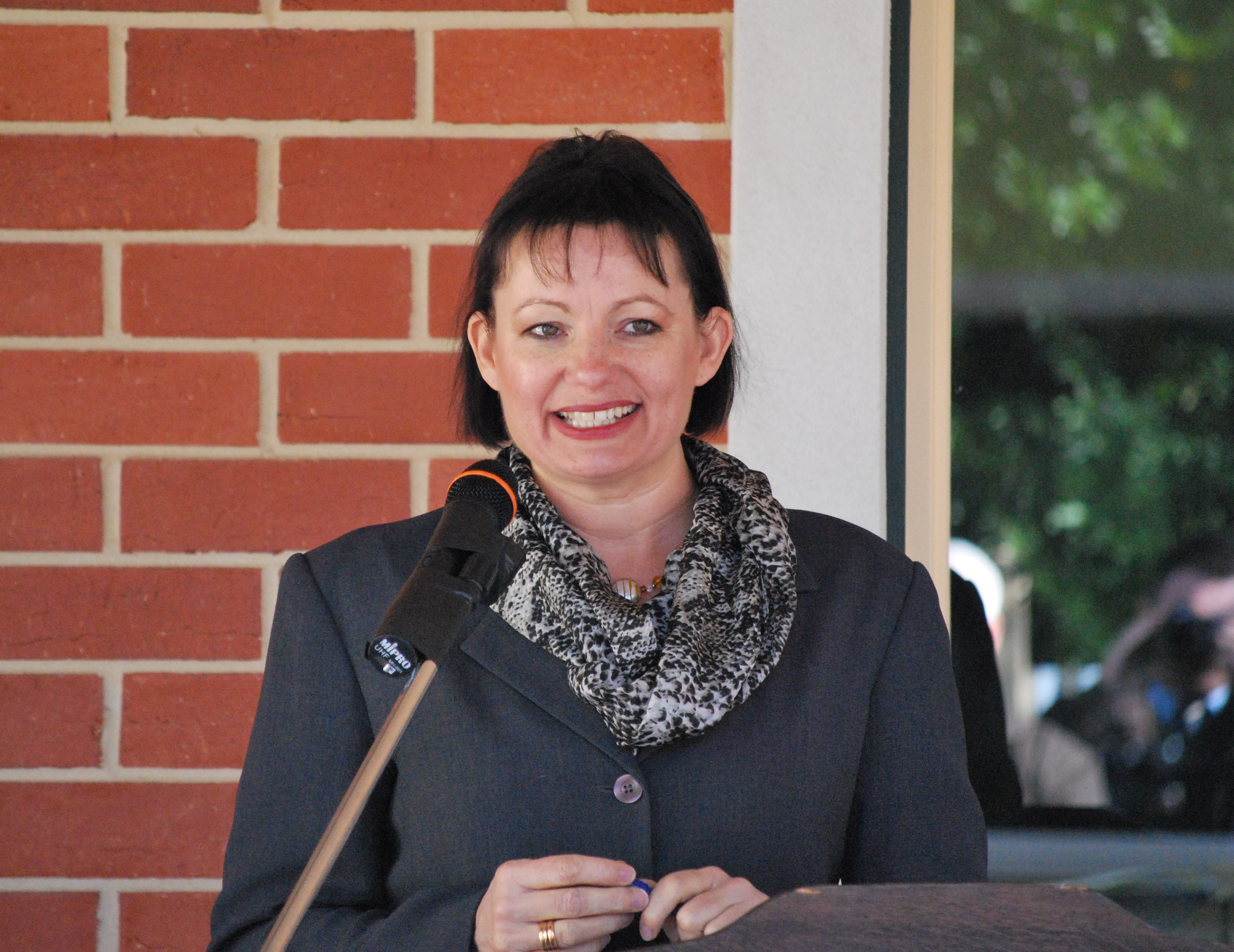
Ley in 2009 at the opening of a library in Jerilderie, New South Wales

Following the 2007 election, Ley was appointed Shadow Minister for Housing and Shadow Minister for Status of Women by Opposition Leader, Dr Brendan Nelson, moving to Shadow Minister for Customs and Justice when Malcolm Turnbull became Opposition Leader in September 2008.

When Tony Abbott became Opposition Leader in December 2009 she was given the portfolio of Shadow Assistant Treasurer and was moved to Shadow Minister for Employment Participation and Shadow Minister for Childcare and Early Childhood Learning after the 2010 election.

=== Abbott and Turnbull governments (2013–2018) ===
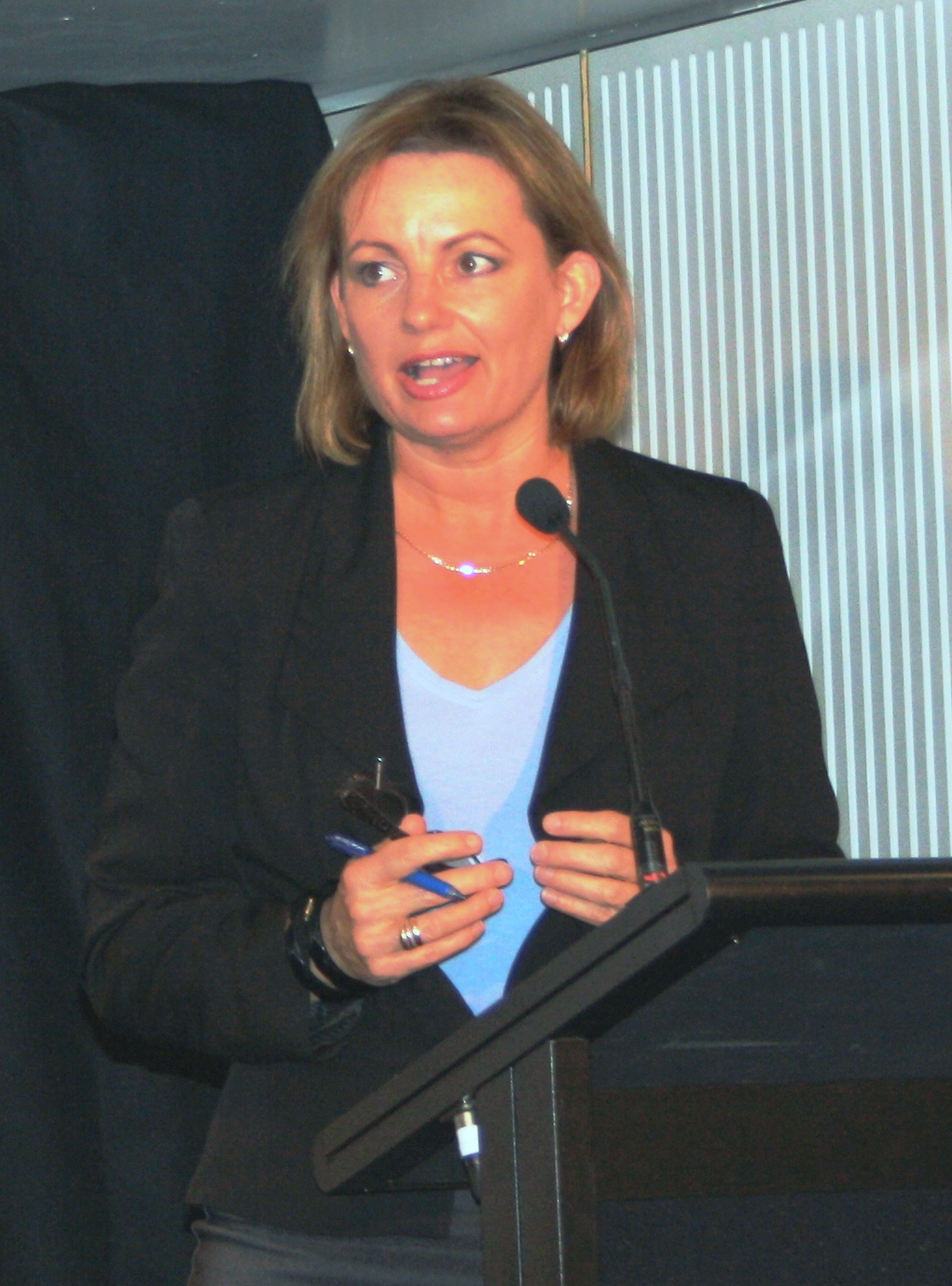
Ley in 2011

In September 2013, following the Coalition's victory at the 2013 federal election, Ley was appointed Assistant Minister for Education in the Abbott government, with responsibility for childcare. Following a ministerial reshuffle, she was promoted to cabinet in December 2014 as Minister for Health and Minister for Sport. She was also made Minister for Aged Care in September 2015 following the replacement of Tony Abbott with Malcolm Turnbull.

In January 2017, an examination of Ley's expenditure claims and travel entitlements revealed she had purchased an apartment on the Gold Coast, close to the business premises of her partner, for $795,000 while on official business in Queensland. Ley defended the purchase, saying her work in the Gold Coast was legitimate, that all travel had been within the rules for entitlements, and that the purchase of the apartment "was not planned nor anticipated" (a claim which was widely derided). On 8 January, Ley released a statement acknowledging that the purchase had changed the context of her travel, and undertaking to repay the government for the cost of the trip in question as well as three others. The Sydney Morning Herald reported that Ley had made 27 taxpayer-funded trips to the Gold Coast in recent years.

On 9 January 2017, Ley announced that she would stand aside from her ministerial portfolios until an investigation into her travel expenses was completed by the Department of Prime Minister and Cabinet. She announced that she would not be making her diaries public. On 13 January 2017, Prime Minister Malcolm Turnbull announced that Ley had resigned from the ministry. Greg Hunt was appointed as Ley's replacement as the Minister for Health and Sport, and Ken Wyatt was appointed Assistant Minister for Health and Minister for Indigenous Health and Aged Care, both with effect from 24 January 2017.

=== Morrison government (2018–2022) ===
During the 2018 Liberal leadership spills, Ley reportedly voted for Peter Dutton against Malcolm Turnbull in the first vote. She subsequently signed the petition requesting to hold a further party meeting to determine the leadership of the Liberal party, and again voted for Dutton against Scott Morrison in the second spill days later, which saw Morrison replace Turnbull as prime minister. On 26 August 2018, Ley was appointed Assistant Minister for Regional Development and Territories in the Morrison government. In May 2019, following the party's victory at the 2019 election, she replaced Melissa Price as Minister for the Environment.

In March 2022, Ley successfully appealed a Federal Court ruling that she had a "duty of care to children to consider climate change harm when approving coal mines". Also in March 2022, Ley approved a Coalition decision to scrap 176 out of 185 recovery plans designed to prevent the extinction of threatened species and habitats, including the Tasmanian devil. This was despite a government call for feedback, which received 6701 responses, all disagreeing with the proposed removal of the recovery plans.

=== Opposition (2022–2025) ===
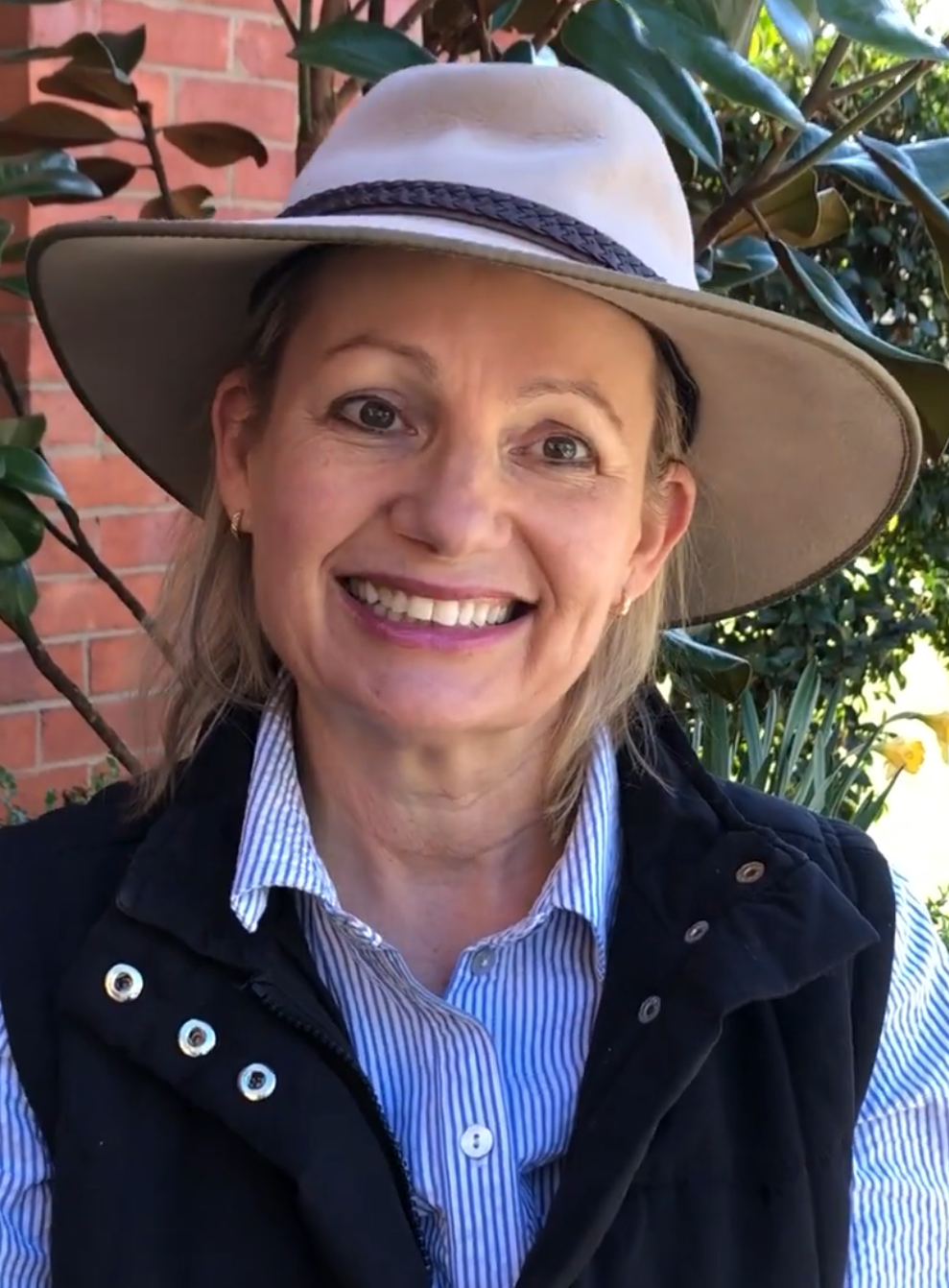
Ley as environment minister in 2021

Following the Coalition's defeat at the 2022 election, it was reported that Ley would be a candidate to replace Josh Frydenberg as deputy leader of the party, following his electoral defeat. Ley was elected unopposed on 30 May 2022. In July 2022, Environment Minister Tanya Plibersek accused Ley, the former Environment Minister, of hiding a document that was handed to the coalition government in December 2021, ahead of the 2022 Australian federal election. The document outlined the poor and declining health of the Australian ecosystem. "It tells a story of crisis and decline in Australia's environment [and] of a decade of government inaction and wilful ignorance," Ms Plibersek said.

In August 2022, ahead of the Jobs and Skills Summit of Australia, Ley falsely stated that no one in the world is making an electric ute. "We know we're not going to have electric vehicles tomorrow," Ms Ley said. "And no one in the world is making an electric ute, by the way, and even if they were it would be unaffordable." After commentators pointed out that electric utes were already in production, a spokesperson for Ms Ley said that Ms Ley meant that, "EV utes are not yet commercially available in Australia and even if EV utes arrived here overnight, cost-effective models — which invariably have lower distance ranges — are not yet suitable for practical use in rural and regional Australia."

In March 2023, Ley dressed up as Tina Turner in Parliament to raise money for cancer. In February 2024, on the eve of the 2024 Dunkley by-election, Ley posted a tweet linking a crime incident in Frankston to "foreign criminals". Victoria Police had charged an immigration detainee but later dropped the charges after a case of mistaken identity. Speaking after the police bungle was revealed, a spokesperson for Ms Ley told the ABC the deputy leader stood by her comments completely, suggesting it spoke to the broader issue of how the government had handled the release of the detainees into the community. Prime Minister Anthony Albanese said it was "extraordinary" that Ley had refused to delete her tweet.

== Leader of the Opposition (2025–2026) ==
Incumbent party leader Peter Dutton lost re-election for his seat of Dickson at the 2025 federal election, making Ley the acting leader of the Liberal Party. She also became the longest-serving Coalition MP at the election. Ley won the subsequent party leadership election by 29 votes to 25, defeating conservative opponent Angus Taylor. Ley is the first woman elected to lead the Liberals, the Coalition, or serve as the leader of the Opposition at the federal level in Australia. At 63, Ley was the oldest first-time leader of the Opposition since Arthur Calwell in 1960.

Days after her election, the Liberal–National Coalition on 20 May 2025 was dissolved due to policy disagreements between the Liberal and National parties. On 28 May, the parties reached an agreement to re-form the coalition. Ley appointed her shadow cabinet that day, making up 16 Liberal MPs and 5 National MPs, with Ted O'Brien becoming the deputy leader and Shadow Treasurer.

On 10 September 2025, Ley removed Jacinta Nampijinpa Price from the shadow cabinet after refusals to publicly support Ley's leadership. A Newspoll conducted later that week indicated that the Coalition had fallen to its lowest level of support since its inception in 1985. Additionally, Shadow Minister for Home Affairs Andrew Hastie resigned from the shadow cabinet after internal disputes with Ley regarding Liberal Party immigration policy and his refusals to comply with Ley's ministry-wide letters of ministerial expectations, dubbed "charter letters".

On 21 January 2026, following a recall of parliament to vote on the Combatting Antisemitism, Hate and Extremism (Criminal and Migration Laws) Bill 2026, all Nationals frontbenchers resigned from the ministry, following the resignation of Senators Susan McDonald, Bridget McKenzie, and Ross Cadell, for voting against the official Coalition position. The next day, Nationals leader David Littleproud confirmed the party had again quit the Coalition, saying "our partyroom has made it clear that we cannot be part of a shadow ministry under Sussan Ley" and that "we sit by ourselves" in the parliament. This is the second time the National party left the Coalition since 2025.

On 8 February 2026, the Coalition reunited following an agreement between the Nationals and Liberals. On the same day, an article in The Daily Telegraph quoted Federal Young Liberal President Cooper Gannon and Vice President Hannah Hutton as calling on her to resign "for the sake of our nation's future", being the first time a Young Liberal President explicitly called on the leader to step aside. Hours later, a poll from Newspoll showed Ley as the least popular opposition leader since Simon Crean in 2003.

=== 2026 leadership spill ===
On 11 February 2026, Angus Taylor resigned from the shadow ministry, citing the Opposition's deteriorating performance under Ley's leadership. In response to the intensifying criticism and Taylor’s resignation, Ley called a leadership spill after Jessica Collins and Phillip Thompson launched a spill motion. (Note: For leadership spills to be held in the Liberal Party, two federal members must move to spill the leadership.) The leadership spill was held on 13 February, resulting in Taylor defeating Ley by a margin of 34 votes to 17 in the spill ballot, ending her tenure as the leader of the Liberal Party. Lasting 276 days, her leadership was the second shortest in the party's history, behind only that of Alexander Downer.

==== Aftermath ====
Following the leadership spill, Ley formally announced her resignation from parliament on 27 February. This triggered a by-election in her electorate of Farrer, which was won by One Nation's David Farley.

== Post-political career ==
Following Ley's deposition as leader of the Liberal Party, she undertook a trip along Route 66 in the United States in August.

In September 2026, Ley was appointed to the board of Snowy Hydro.

== Political positions ==
Ley is a member of the moderate faction of the Liberal Party, with ABC News stating that she had also been backed by the moderate faction in the leadership election where she was elected as a leader. Ley identifies as a feminist, and is a republican. In a 2022 interview, she stated "the times change, and no matter how relevant the monarchy might have been, no matter how elegant, it's definitely neither relevant or elegant to my children ... and that view is widespread." Ley voted for legalising same-sex marriage in 2017.

In 2011, Ley publicly supported the admission of the State of Palestine to the United Nations and was reported to be a member of the cross-party Parliamentary Friends of Palestine group. In October 2022, Ley travelled to Israel, leading a delegation on a trip organised by AIJAC, to reaffirm the Coalition's commitment to West Jerusalem as the nation’s capital and observe the impact of the Abraham Accords. Ley said the accords and her visit had changed her view. In June 2024, Ley criticised Labor's decision not to expel Fatima Payman after Payman crossed the floor to express support for Palestine, at which time Payman accused Israel of committing genocide during Gaza war and using phrase "From the river to the sea, Palestine will be free". As opposition leader in August 2025, Ley stated she would reverse the Albanese government's decision to recognise a Palestinian state should she win office.

In May 2018, Ley introduced a private member's bill to ban the live export of sheep. In 2023, Ley changed her position and stated her support for the sheep live export industry. In 2023, Ley supported the No vote in the 2023 Australian Indigenous Voice referendum. Ley has voiced support for Elon Musk and during Australia Day celebrations in 2025 was quoted as comparing the British colonisation of Australia to Musk's intended colonisation of Mars. In 2024, Ley said she was "disappointed" in Musk and backed the eSafety commissioner Julie Inman Grant, "I'm for X obeying the law, and I'm not for the actions and the statements of our eSafety commissioner being ignored."

Ley delayed the release of the Coalition’s new migration policy following the Bondi Beach terrorist attack in December 2025. She cited concerns about fraying social cohesion and the risk that a fresh debate on migration levels would be inflammatory during an extremely sensitive time. Instead of pursuing the migration debate, Ley shifted the Coalition's focus to national security and counter-terrorism, calling for the immediate formation of an antisemitism and counter-terrorism taskforce. Ley has previously argued that the current permanent migration intake of 180,000–185,000 is too high and should be reduced to approximately 140,000.

== Personal life ==
Ley met John Ley while aerial stock-mustering in south-west Queensland. They married in 1987, settled on her husband's family farm in north-east Victoria, and had three children before their 2004 divorce. Ley has multiple grandchildren, residing on the NSW Central Coast. Ley lives in Albury, and owns an investment property in Albury and one on the Gold Coast.

Ley is vegetarian. She is a supporter of the Sydney Swans Australian rules football club.

Ley's mother Angela Braybrooks died on 17 May 2025, four days after Ley's election as opposition leader. She had been living in an aged care home in Albury.

== Notes ==
Parliament of Australia
Preceded by Tim Fischer	Member for Farrer; 2001–2026	Succeeded by David Farley
Political offices
Preceded by Christopher Pyne as Parliamentary Secretary to the Minister for Family and Community Services	Parliamentary Secretary to the Minister for Family and Community Services (Children and Youth Affairs); 2004–2006	Office abolished
Preceded by Richard Colbeck	Parliamentary Secretary to the Minister for Agriculture, Fisheries and Forestry; 2006–2007	Succeeded by Mike Kelly as Parliamentary Secretary for Agriculture, Fisheries and Forestry
Preceded by Tanya Plibersek as Shadow Minister for Human Services and Housing	Shadow Minister for Housing; 2007–2008	Succeeded by Tony Abbott as Shadow Minister for Families, Housing, Community Services and Indigenous Affairs
Preceded by Tanya Plibersek	Shadow Minister for the Status of Women; 2007–2008	Succeeded by Sophie Mirabella as Shadow Minister for Early Childhood Education, Childcare, Women and Youth
Preceded by Christopher Pyne as Shadow Minister for Justice and Border Protection	Shadow Minister for Justice and Customs; 2008–2009	Succeeded by Michael Keenan
Preceded by Tony Smith	Shadow Assistant Treasurer; 2009–2010	Succeeded by Mathias Cormann
Preceded by Mathias Cormann as Shadow Minister for Employment Participation, Apprenticeships and Training	Shadow Minister for Employment Participation; 2010–2013	Succeeded by Julie Collins as Shadow Minister for Employment Services
Preceded by Sharman Stone as Shadow Minister for Early Childhood Education and Childcare	Shadow Minister for Childcare and Early Childhood; 2010–2013	Succeeded by Kate Ellis as Shadow Minister for Early Childhood
Preceded by Kate Ellis as Minister for Early Childhood, Childcare and Youth	Assistant Minister for Education; 2013–2014	Succeeded by Simon Birmingham as Assistant Minister for Education and Training
Preceded by Peter Dutton	Minister for Sport; 2014–2017	Succeeded by Greg Hunt
Preceded by Peter Dutton	Minister for Health; 2014–2016	Succeeded by Herself as Minister for Health and Aged Care
Preceded by Christian Porter as Minister for Social Services	Minister for Aged Care; 2015–2016	Succeeded by Herself as Minister for Health and Aged Care
Preceded by Herself as Minister for Health and Minister for Aged Care	Minister for Health and Aged Care; 2016–2017	Succeeded by Arthur Sinodinos as Acting Minister for Health and Aged Care
New office	Assistant Minister for Regional Development and Territories; 2018–2019	Office abolished
Preceded by Melissa Price	Minister for the Environment; 2019–2022	Succeeded by Tanya Plibersek as Minister for the Environment and Water
Preceded by Tanya Plibersek	Shadow Minister for Women; 2022–2025	Succeeded by Melissa McIntosh
Preceded by Ed Husic as Shadow Minister for Industry and Innovation	Shadow Minister for Industry, Skills and Training; 2022–2025	Succeeded by Alex Hawke as Shadow Minister for Industry and Innovation
Preceded by Richard Marles as Shadow Minister for National Reconstruction, Employment, Skills and Small Business	Shadow Minister for Industry, Skills and Training; 2022–2025	Succeeded by Scott Buchholz as Shadow Minister for Skills and Training
Preceded by Richard Marles	Deputy Leader of the Opposition of Australia; 2022–2025	Succeeded by Ted O'Brien
Preceded by Peter Dutton	Leader of the Opposition of Australia; 2025–2026	Succeeded by Angus Taylor
Party political offices
Preceded by Josh Frydenberg	Deputy Leader of the Liberal Party; 2022–2025	Succeeded by Ted O'Brien
Preceded by Peter Dutton	Leader of the Liberal Party of Australia; 2025–2026	Succeeded by Angus Taylor
