= Pacific Australia Labour Mobility scheme =

Australian guest worker program

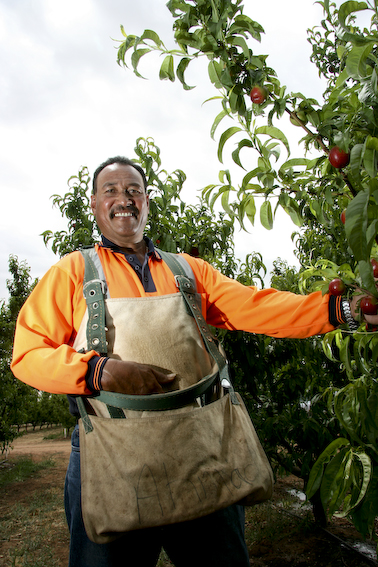
Pacific Islander seasonal worker in Australia

The Pacific Australia Labour Mobility (PALM) scheme is a guest worker program that allows Australian businesses to hire temporary workers from nine Pacific island countries and Timor-Leste. The scheme allows participating workers to work in seasonal agricultural jobs for up to 9 months, or in longer-term jobs for between 1 and 4 years. The scheme was launched as the Pacific Seasonal Worker Pilot Scheme in 2008 and initially only permitted employment in Australia's agricultural sector, but has since expanded to other industries, including meat processing and aged care.

Over 30,000 workers were employed through the scheme in August 2024, with about 90% employed in agriculture and meat processing. The Australian government has described the PALM scheme as a "triple win" that addresses labour shortages in Australia, provides well-paid employment to participating workers, and provides skill development and remittances to developing Pacific island nations. However, the scheme has faced criticism for alleged worker exploitation and for its rate of deaths and injuries. In a 2024 report, the New South Wales Anti-Slavery Commissioner highlighted poor working conditions and risks of modern slavery facilitated by the scheme. The scheme has also been criticised for facilitating brain drain from Pacific island nations and for providing limited benefits to Pacific workers.

== History ==
In 2008, the predecessor of the PALM scheme—the Pacific Seasonal Worker Pilot Scheme—was launched to allow unskilled and low-skilled workers from Pacific island countries to work in Australia’s agricultural sector. The pilot aimed to both strengthen Australia’s relations with Pacific nations and address a seasonal labour shortage—estimated at 22,000 workers by the National Farmers' Federation. The pilot program initially had low take-up from workers, which was attributed to a lack of awareness among employers and a lack of demand for additional agricultural labour due to an existing supply of backpackers employed in the sector on working holiday visas and widespread illegal employment in the sector. The scheme was also outpaced by New Zealand's Recognised Seasonal Employer scheme, which had commenced three years earlier amid a similar shortage of seasonal labour. A final evaluation report gave a largely positive assessment of the Australian pilot scheme, finding that despite its limited uptake, it had provided benefits to participants and had helped agricultural employers meet their demand for labour.

In December 2011, the government announced its intention to launch a permanent version of the scheme, the Seasonal Worker Program (SWP). The SWP was similar to the pilot scheme in most respects, but three new sectors—aquaculture, cotton and cane—were added, and the cap on the number of workers was expanded to 12,000 over a four year period. In 2018, the Australian government launched the Pacific Labour Scheme (PLS), which allowed for longer-term employment than the seasonal agricultural work permitted under the SWP. In April 2022, the SWP and PLS were consolidated into the PALM scheme.

The number of PALM workers in Australia grew significantly during the COVID-19 pandemic, when most other temporary worker groups were barred from entering the country. The number of participants grew from about 6,000 in 2019 to almost 35,000 at the beginning of 2024. But participation in the scheme fell by 24% between July 2023 and July 2024, in large part due to the return of other populations of temporary workers. The decline has also been attributed to a set of 2023 reforms that required PALM scheme workers to be paid for at least 30 hours of work per week. The rule was introduced to ensure that workers would continue to be paid even during their employers' slower periods, but agricultural employers argued that the rule was overly onerous given fluctuations in their operations. The National Federation of Farmers has argued that these changes to visa rules have made it harder for agricultural employers to participate in the scheme.

== Operation ==
PALM scheme workers by country of origin, August 2024
Country of origin	Number of workers
Fiji	5,995
Vanuatu	5,780
Solomon Islands	4,820
Timor-Leste	3,760
Tonga	3,680
Samoa	2,865
Papua New Guinea	1,960
Kiribati	1,605
Tuvalu	310
Nauru	35

Workers from 10 countries are eligible for the PALM scheme—Fiji, Kiribati, Nauru, Papua New Guinea, Samoa, Solomon Islands, Timor-Leste, Tonga, Tuvalu and Vanuatu. Participants in the short-term stream can work in seasonal agricultural jobs for up to 9 months, while participants in the long-term stream can work in Australia for between 1 and 4 years. As of August 2024, there were 30,805 PALM scheme workers in Australia, one third of whom were living in Queensland. 52% were working in farming, 39% were working in meat processing and 6% were working in accommodation and care. PALM scheme workers make up about 10% of Australia's agricultural workforce, and nearly 33% of its meat processing workforce. The scheme has 494 participating employers, of which 102 are labour hire companies.

Many Pacific island workers can earn substantially more in Australia through the PALM scheme and often remit a portion of their income to support their families in their home countries. Participants in the long-term stream earned an average annual salary of $40,836 in 2020, of which they were able to save or send home an average of 39%. PALM scheme workers remitted $184 million in the four year period up to 2022. Some Pacific island countries take in a significant sum through remittances; in 2022, Samoa had the world's second highest level of remittance income as a percentage of GDP at 34%. Proponents of the program have also argued that it helps workers to build skills and save money that they can bring back to their home countries. Some countries have seen high demand for the program; in August 2025, Fiji had a backlog of more than 20,000 visa applications from workers seeking to participate in the PALM scheme.

The Australian government has labelled the program a "triple win" that benefits Pacific island nations, participating workers, and Australian businesses. Despite beginning as an agricultural labour scheme, the PALM scheme has been progressively expanded into other sectors, including meat processing, aged care, hospitality and retail. Some employers have also praised the scheme, saying that it helps them to fill lower-skilled positions that are otherwise difficult to fill.

Beginning in 2023, concerns were raised that some PALM workers were taking advantage of the asylum application backlog by leaving their employers and lodging asylum applications, allowing them to remain and work in the country on bridging visas while their claims were processed. In the 2023–2024 financial year, asylum applications from the approximately 30,000 PALM workers in Australia reached a rate of 244 per month. The academic Stephen Howes has labelled many of these asylum claims "bogus", pointing out that asylum applications from PALM countries, with the exception of Papua New Guinea, are almost never granted.

== Criticism ==
The PALM scheme has been criticised for tying workers to a single sponsoring employer, limiting their ability to change jobs. Scholars and advocates have argued that this enables exploitation by making it more difficult for workers to speak up about wage theft and poor working conditions. In April 2025 it was reported that 7,000 PALM scheme workers had absconded from their employers over the past five years. Concerns regarding worker exploitation have been present since the earliest days of the scheme; the Australian Institute of Criminology published research into the potential for worker exploitation in the pilot scheme in 2011. A 2024 report from the New South Wales Anti-Slavery Commissioner highlighted modern slavery risks associated with the PALM scheme. A number of PALM scheme employers have also been investigated or fined for underpaying or exploiting workers.

The scheme has also been criticised for providing workers with less access to government programs and benefits than Australian residents. The Australia Institute has noted that PALM workers are often taxed at a higher rate than Australian residents and have limited access to their superannuation savings. Some workers have been overcharged by their employers for services like accommodation and transport, and many have deductions made from their pay to cover the cost of their flights to Australia. PALM workers do not have access to Medicare and must generally take out private health insurance, and also face high remittance costs. President of Timor-Leste José Ramos-Horta criticised the overcharging of Timorese workers for accommodation and transport by PALM scheme employers in an October 2024 speech, saying that the PALM scheme has a positive effect on the Timorese economy, but that it is exploitative in its current form.

Pacific island leaders have also expressed concerns that the benefits of the PALM scheme for Pacific island nations and workers are exaggerated. PALM workers in Australia make up 9% of the Tongan working age population, 5% of the working age population of Vanuatu, and 3% of the working age population of Samoa. This has led Pacific leaders to express concerns about brain drain and the effects of the PALM scheme on their domestic economies. Samoa, Tonga and Vanuatu have all commenced reviews of their participation in labour mobility schemes as a result of these concerns. The scheme has also been criticised for creating social problems in Pacific countries, including the phenomenon of families being abandoned by spouses living in Australia. In response to these concerns, the Australian government launched a pilot program in 2023 that would allow some PALM scheme workers to bring their families with them to Australia.

The scheme has also received criticism for its rate of worker deaths and injuries. 29 PALM scheme participants died in the 2022–23 financial year, and 233 critical incidents involving worker injuries were recorded between 2020 and 2023. Between 2021 and 2023, between 10 and 14 participants died in boating and car accidents, 17 died due to medical conditions, and the cause of 17 additional deaths remained under investigation as of December 2023. The rate of deaths among PALM scheme workers was described as "staggering" by a former deputy secretary of the Australian Department of Immigration in 2025. In August 2024, representatives of the Fijian government announced plans to visit Australia to investigate working conditions after a Fijian woman died of a brain tumour while working at an Australian abattoir, with some former coworkers alleging that workers had faced restrictions around accessing sick leave and medical care. Researchers and physicians have also reported that women participating in the PALM scheme who become pregnant often seek abortions to remain in Australia and to comply with their visa conditions.
