= Gerard Rennick People First =

People First Party Gerard Rennick People First
- Abbreviation: GRPF; PFP
- Leader: Gerard Rennick
- Founder: Gerard Rennick
- Founded: 25 August 2024; 2 years ago
- Registered: 5 December 2024; 21 months ago
- Split from: Liberal National
- Headquarters: 14 Banfield Street, Chermside, Queensland
- Membership (2025): 3,000
- Ideology: Conservatism (Australian); Australian nationalism
- Political position: Right-wing to far-right
- Colours: Teal blue
- House of Representatives: 0 / 150
- Senate: 0 / 76

Website
- peoplefirstparty.au

Gerard Rennick People First (GRPF), also known as the People First Party (PFP), is an Australian political party founded by Gerard Rennick in August 2024. Rennick was elected to the Senate as a Liberal National Party of Queensland candidate in 2019. Gerard Rennick People First was officially registered by the Australian Electoral Commission (AEC) on 5 December 2024, in order to contest the 2025 federal election.

== Background and history ==
Beginning in 2021, Liberal National Party (LNP) senator Gerard Rennick began to receive criticism for his social media posts and his stance towards both federal and state government measures taken around the COVID-19 pandemic in Australia, including state border closures, domestic travel restrictions and vaccine mandates. Rennick's critical stance towards government policy continued throughout 2021–2022, and was labelled a "rebel" right-wing MP. By early July 2023 Rennick narrowly lost preselection for the LNP's Senate ticket at the next federal election (2025).

In August 2024, Rennick quit the LNP and announced a new political party to contest the 2025 federal election. In December 2024, the party was officially registered by the Australian Electoral Commission (AEC).

In 2026, it was reported that People First would be merging with the Australian Citizens Party later that year.

=== 2025 federal election ===
Ahead of the 2025 federal election, it was announced in March 2025 that People First had entered into an electoral alliance with the HEART Party and the Libertarian Party. The announced agreement, known as the "Australia First Alliance", placed People First Senate candidates on a joint ticket with both the HEART Party and the Libertarian Party in New South Wales, and on a joint ticket with the HEART Party in Victoria. The following month (14 April), People First entered into another electoral agreement: uniting with the Townsville-based Katter's Australian Party (KAP) on a joint Senate ticket for Queensland.

For the 2025 federal election, People First had a total of 25 candidates running across the country. Party leader, Gerard Rennick, was the lead Senate candidate for Queensland, where the majority (16/25) of its candidates were running. Rennick stated the party had over 2,000 members by May 2025, with an aim to have 5,000 by the next election. Nationally, People First received 151,310 primary votes (0.95% of the national primary), failing to get any candidate elected.

== Beliefs and policies ==
Rennick is a right-wing to far-right former politician. He describes himself as a protectionist and on economic policy said he favoured a "protectionist nationalist" form of capitalism. Since the party's foundation, it has been characterised as conservative, particularly its economic policies, and right-wing, while holding a "staunchly right-wing political stance" with a "very committed base of supporters".

Rennick, an accountant by trade, has claimed Australia's current rate of withholding tax provided an incentive for multinational firms to "ship their profits offshore", and called for lowering the company tax rate to 12%, more than half its current rate (2019). He also cited Australia's system of corporate revenue collection was "why I really want to run" for Parliament. Rennick has also called for scrapping franking credits, stating: "So, if you really wanted to reform the tax system... you should get rid of franking credits altogether and just have a lower, flatter company tax rate."

=== Policies ===
- Withdrawal of Australia from the World Health Organization (WHO).
- Remove all funding and references to climate change.
- Drop net-zero and leave the Paris Agreement.
- Supports coal, nuclear, gas and hydro energy.
- Raising the tax-free threshold from $18,200 to $40,000.
- Giving childcare subsidy payments directly to parents (subject to welfare checks).
- Advocate that superannuation be voluntary and use the savings to lift the pension.
- Call a Federal Convention to streamline the duplication of roles and responsibilities of State and Federal Governments.
- Advocate to means-test the pensions of retired white-collar public servants.
- Abolish the Climate Change Department and subsidies for renewables.
- Reinstatement of a public bank (similar to the Commonwealth Bank between 1911 and 1991) and reintroduce a Government Insurance Office.
- Establishing a "Infrastructure Bank", which would issue bonds to the Federal and State Governments for seven types of Infrastructure – Dams, Baseload Power Stations (not renewables), Roads, Rail, Ports, Airports and Telecommunications.
- Abolish the "Multicultural Department". (Note: There is no official "Multicultural Department" within the Australian Government. Responsibilities for matters relating to it are within the Department of Home Affairs.)
- Lower the corporate tax rate to 25%.
- Hold a referendum on enshrining freedom of speech in the Constitution.
- Limit immigration to under 100,000 work visas and incentivise settlement in regional areas.
- Prevent welfare benefits to foreign-born citizens for a ten-year period; repeal the Mobility Arrangement for Talented Early Professionals Scheme (MATES) with India.
- Oppose any legalisation of cannabis other than for medical reasons.
- Oppose abortion except when the mother's life is in danger.
