= Wirrpanda =

Wirrpanda is a surname that belongs to the Djapu clan of Yolngu people, an Aboriginal Australian people of Arnhem Land, in the Northern Territory of Australia.

People with this name include:

- David Wirrpanda (born 1979), Australian rules footballer
- Dhakiyarr Wirrpanda (c.1900–1934), community leader who was unlawfully killed
- Margaret Wirrpanda (1939–2013), Aboriginal rights advocate, co-founder of Victorian Aboriginal Health Service
- Mulkuṉ Wirrpanda (1947–2021), community leader
