= Yorta Yorta =

Aboriginal Australian people

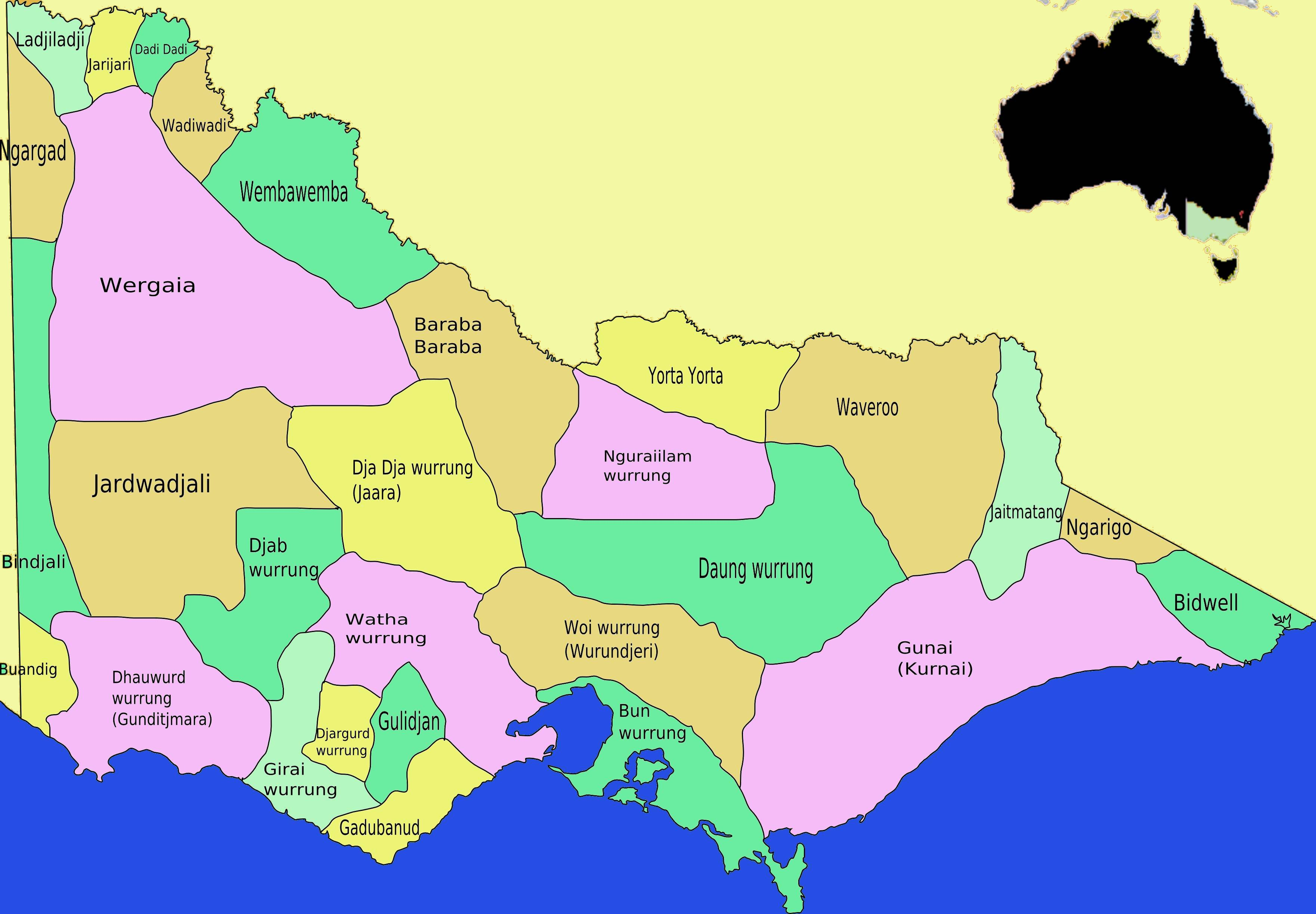
Aboriginal Victorians' language territories

The Yorta Yorta, also known as Jotijota, (Note: The presence of the "r" in the first term does not indicate the presence of a rhotic consonant, but probably merely indicates a vowel quality similar to the aw sound in yawn (Bowe & Morey 1999, p. 3)) are an Aboriginal Australian people who have traditionally inhabited the area surrounding the junction of the Goulburn and Murray Rivers in present-day north-eastern Victoria and southern New South Wales.

== Names ==
As was customary with many tribal names in the Murray basin – Wemba-Wemba, Latjilatji, Muthi Muthi, Nari-Nari and so on – the Yorta ethnonym is derived from reduplicating their word for "no" (yota/yoda).

Norman Tindale (1974) listed the following alternative names used to refer to Yorta Yorta people:

- Arramouro
- DjaDja Wurrung clan
- Echuca clan (used of Yorta Yorta clans south of the Murray)
- Gunbowerooranditchgoole
- Gunbowers (toponym, now Gunbower)
- Loddon clan
- Moira (toponym)
- Ngarrimouro, Ngarrimowro
- Wollithiga
- Woollathura
- Yoorta (also an exonym for some clans of the Bangerang clan)
- Yotayota

== Language ==
The Yorta Yorta language may be a language isolate within the Pama-Nyungan language family, though it is often treated as a member of the Yotayotic branch of that family along with Yabula Yabula, which is not particularly close. It is a dialect continuum of closely related languages traditionally spoken on either side of the Murray River from west of Echuca to east of the Cobram/Tocumwal area, and south-east along the Goulburn River as far as the Mooroopna/Shepparton. It was the first language for many of these groups down to around 1960 but elements of the language are still transmitted in families by descendants to this day.

It shares few similarities in vocabulary with the languages used by neighbouring tribes, and lexically seems closest to Pallanganmiddang.

== Social organisation ==
The Yorta Yorta were divided into clans, of which the names of ten were enumerated by Edward Micklethwaite Curr based on the situation in the 1840s:

- Wongātpan (150 persons)
- DjaDja Wurrung (150 persons)
- Tōwroonbanā (50 persons)
- Wollīthiga (50 persons)
- Kaīilthiban (Note: also called Waarīngulum (Bowe & Morey 1999, p. 6)) (50 persons)
- Moītheriban (300 persons)
- Pikkolātpan (100 persons)
- Angōōtheriban (100 persons)
- Ngarrimōwro (100 persons)
- Toolenyāgan (100 persons)
- Boongātpan

Tindale (1974) named only three:

- Gunbowerooranditchgoole (Note: -goole represents kuli, meaning "man")
- Ngarrimouro
- Woollathura

Another source mentions "Dhulinyagan".

The numbers may well estimate the historic population since evidence from oven mounds in the area suggested a higher population density in former times, and it is known that the area was ravaged by smallpox epidemics.

In modern times, the Yorta Yorta comprise a number of historically distinct tribes, as well as clans and family groups descending directly from the original Yorta Yorta. Tribes that now come under the general umbrella term of Yorta Yorta include the Bangerang and Kwatkwat. Clans groups represented include the Kailtheban, Wollithiga, Moira, Ulupna, Yalaba Yalaba, and'.

== 1995 Native title claim ==
In a Native title claim submitted in 1995 by the Yorta Yorta people, it was determined by Justice Olney in 1998 that the "tide of history" had "washed away" any real acknowledgement of traditional laws and any real observance of traditional customs by the applicants. An appeal was made to the full bench of the Federal Court on the grounds that "the trial judge erroneously adopted a 'frozen in time' approach" and "failed to give sufficient recognition to the capacity of traditional laws and customs to adapt to changed circumstances". The Appeal was dismissed in a majority 2 to 1 decision. The case was taken on appeal to the High Court of Australia but also dismissed in a 5 to 2 majority ruling in December 2002.

In response to the failed native title claim, in May 2004 the Victoria State Government led by Premier Steve Bracks signed a historic co-operative management agreement with the Yorta Yorta people covering public land, rivers and lakes in north-central Victoria. The agreement gives the Yorta Yorta people a say in the management of the traditional country including the Barmah State Park, Barmah State Forest, Kow Swamp and public land along the Murray and Goulburn rivers. Ultimate decision-making responsibility was retained by the Environment Minister.

== Yorta Yorta Nation Aboriginal Corporation ==
The Yorta Yorta Nation Aboriginal Corporation (YYNAC), established in 1999 and not to be confused with the former Yorta Yorta Local Aboriginal Land Council which took ownership of Cummeragunja Reserve in NSW in 1984, has its headquarters in Barmah and a branch office in Shepparton. YYNAC is governed by a board of seven directors, one of whom is an Elder’s representative, and a Council of Elders comprising 16 Yorta Yorta family group representatives. There is a CEO who manages the day-to-day operations, administration and personnel.

=== History ===
The Aborigines Advancement League (AAL) was established in the 1930s by Yorta Yorta activists such as William Cooper, Sir Douglas Nicholls, Marj Tucker, Geraldine Briggs and Shadrach James. It lodged a claim for the Barmah Forest in 1975 which was rejected by the Victorian Government.

The Yorta Yorta Tribal Council (YYTC), formally established in April 1983, but according to some accounts originally established in 1972 by Elizabeth Maud Hoffman, Margaret Wirrpanda and others, took over the work of the AAL in working for the Yorta Yorta people. Among the founders were It made another claim for the Barmah Forest in 1984 under the Cain government, which did not succeed.

The Yorta Yorta Tribal Council was superseded by the Yorta Yorta Clans Group (YYCG) in 1989, which broadened its scope and encompassed a wider geographic area of traditional Yorta Yorta land. YYCG was superseded by the YYNAC in 1999.

=== TOSA land settlement ===
In October 2010, the State entered into a Traditional Owner Land Management Agreement with the Yorta Yorta, which established the Yorta Yorta Traditional Owner Land Management Board to jointly manage Barmah National Park (a "TOSA" settlement, under the Traditional Owner Settlement Act 2010).

The Yorta Yorta Traditional Owner Land Management Board is a unit of YYNAC. As recognised traditional owners of the land, a joint management plan is as of 2020 being agreed between the YYNAC and the State of Victoria. Parks Victoria, as designated manager of Barmah National Park, will have responsibility for implementing many of the plan's strategies and actions, working in partnership with the YYNAC and other partners such as the Department of Environment, Land, Water and Planning (DELWP).

== Prominent People ==
- Arthur Fox – prominent indigenous leader and uncle to the people (1941– present day)
- Briggs, hip-hop artist
- Burnum Burnum (1936–1997), activist, actor and author
- Deborah Cheetham (born 1964), opera singer and composer
- William Cooper (1861–1941), helped establish the Australian Aborigines' League in 1935, led the first Aboriginal deputation to a Commonwealth minister, and another to protest the treatment of Jews and Christians in 1938
- Scott Darlow, singer, songwriter
- Jeremy Finlayson, Australian rules footballer
- Isaiah Firebrace, singer who represented Australia in the Eurovision Song Contest 2017
- Jade Gresham – Australian rules footballer
- Joel Hamling – Australian rules footballer
- Jarman Impey – Australian rules footballer
- Jimmy Little (1937–2012), musician whose career spanned over six decades. His 1958 song "Give the Coloured Boy a Chance" was the first written and recorded by an Indigenous Australian for the modern music industry.
- Sir Douglas Nicholls (1906–1988), professional athlete, pastor and pioneering campaigner for Aboriginal reconciliation, the first Aboriginal person to be knighted, and the 1976 first Indigenous Australian to hold vice-regal office (Governor of South Australia)
- Bill Onus (1906–1968), activist and actor
- Lin Onus (1948–1996), artist, son of Bill
- Jack Patten (1905–1957), professional boxer, civil rights activist, war veteran, writer, president and co-founder of the Aborigines Progressive Association. He led the first delegation of Aboriginal people to meet with a serving prime minister.
- John Trevor Patten (born 1936), Australian bantamweight boxing champion between 1958 and 1962
- Jy Simpkin – Australian rules footballer
- Wes Patten (born 1974), actor, television host, and former NRL player
- Margaret Tucker, civil rights activist and writer, known for her part in the 1938 Day of Mourning conference; first Aboriginal person to have published an autobiography
- Andrew Walker, a former AFL player with the Carlton Football Club
- David Wirrpanda, former AFL player with the West Coast Eagles, known for his community work in helping to improve the lives of young Indigenous Australians, named the 9th most influential Aboriginal Australian by The Bulletin in 2007
- Margaret Wirrpanda, activist, niece of Margaret Tucker, born at Cummeragunja, New South Wales, daughter of activists Geraldine Clements Briggs and Selwyn Briggs and mother to David Wirrpanda
- Drmngnow, rapper, dancer, artist, and actor

== Music ==
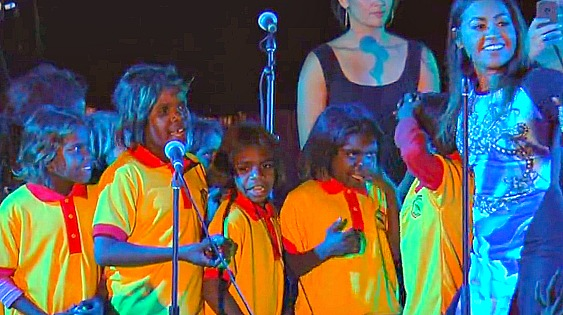
Indigenous pop singer Jessica Mauboy performs "Ngarra Burra Ferra" at the 2013 Mbantua Festival in Alice Springs, with Aboriginal Australian students from Yipirinya State Primary School, of which Mauboy is the official ambassador.

The track "Ngarra Burra Ferra" sung by indigenous artist Jessica Mauboy, from the 2012 hit film The Sapphires, is a song based on the traditional Aboriginal hymn "Bura Fera". The song is in the Yorta Yorta language and speaks of God's help in decimating Pharaoh's armies. The chorus, "Ngara burra ferra yumini yala yala", translates into English as "The Lord God drowned all Pharaoh's armies, hallelujah!" These lyrics are based on an ancient song in Jewish tradition known as the "Song of the Sea" from the Book of Exodus. Aboriginal communities of Victoria and southern New South Wales may be the only people in the world who still sing the piece (in Yorta Yorta).

== See also ==
- Wharparilla Flora Reserve, a small environmental reserve, the place where the Yorta Yorta first met European settlers

== Sources ==
- Barnett, Laura (22 October 2013). "Aboriginal opera singer Deborah Cheetham: 'Not everyone was as lucky as me'". The Guardian.
- Blandowski, W. von (1858). "Recent discoveries in natural history on the Lower Murray". Transactions of the Philosophical Society of Victoria. 2: 124–127.
- Bowe, Heather; Morey, Stephen (1999). The Yorta Yorta (Bangerang) language of the Murray Goulburn: including Yabula Yabula. Pacific Linguistics. ISBN 978-0-858-83513-9.
- Curr, Edward Micklethwaite (1887). "Book The Twenty-Third" (PDF). In Curr, Edward Micklethwaite (ed.). The Australian race: its origin, languages, customs, place of landing in Australia and the routes by which it spread itself over the continent. Vol. 3. Melbourne: J. Ferres. pp. 567–592.
- "Deputation not admitted". The Argus. Melbourne. 7 December 1938. p. 3 – via National Library of Australia.
- Goldberg, Dan (10 December 2012). "An Aboriginal Protest Against the Nazis, Finally Delivered". Haaretz.
- "The lyrics to Bura Fera". We Want To Walk With You. 13 September 2013. Archived from the original on 10 April 2017.
- Members of the Yorta Yorta Aboriginal Community v Victoria [1998] FCA 1606 (18 December 1998), Federal Court (Australia).
- Members of the Yorta Yorta Aboriginal Community v Victoria [2001] FCA 45 (8 February 2001), Federal Court (Full Court) (Australia).
- Members of the Yorta Yorta Aboriginal Community v Victoria [2002] HCA 58, (2002) 214 CLR 422 (12 December 2002), High Court (Australia).
- "Remembering Margaret Tucker (1904–1996)". Koori History. 6 March 2016.
- Shiel, Fergus (1 May 2004). "Yorta Yorta win historic deal". The Age.
- Tindale, Norman Barnett (1974). Aboriginal Tribes of Australia: Their Terrain, Environmental Controls, Distribution, Limits, and Proper Names. Australian National University Press. ISBN 978-0-708-10741-6.
- "Wirrpanda recognised for work". Australian Football League. 30 November 2007. Archived from the original on 6 June 2012.
- Yaxley, Louise (12 December 2002). "Yorta Yorta lose native title case". The World Today. Australian Broadcasting Corporation.
- "Yorta Yorta Co-operative Management Agreement". Archived from the original on 13 September 2006.
