= 2022 Australian federal election =

Election for the 47th Parliament of Australia

- 21 May 2022

All 151 seats in the House of Representatives and 40 (of the 76) seats in the Senate 76 seats needed for a majority
- Opinion polls
- Registered: 17,228,900 ▲4.90%
- Turnout: 89.82% (▼2.07 pp)
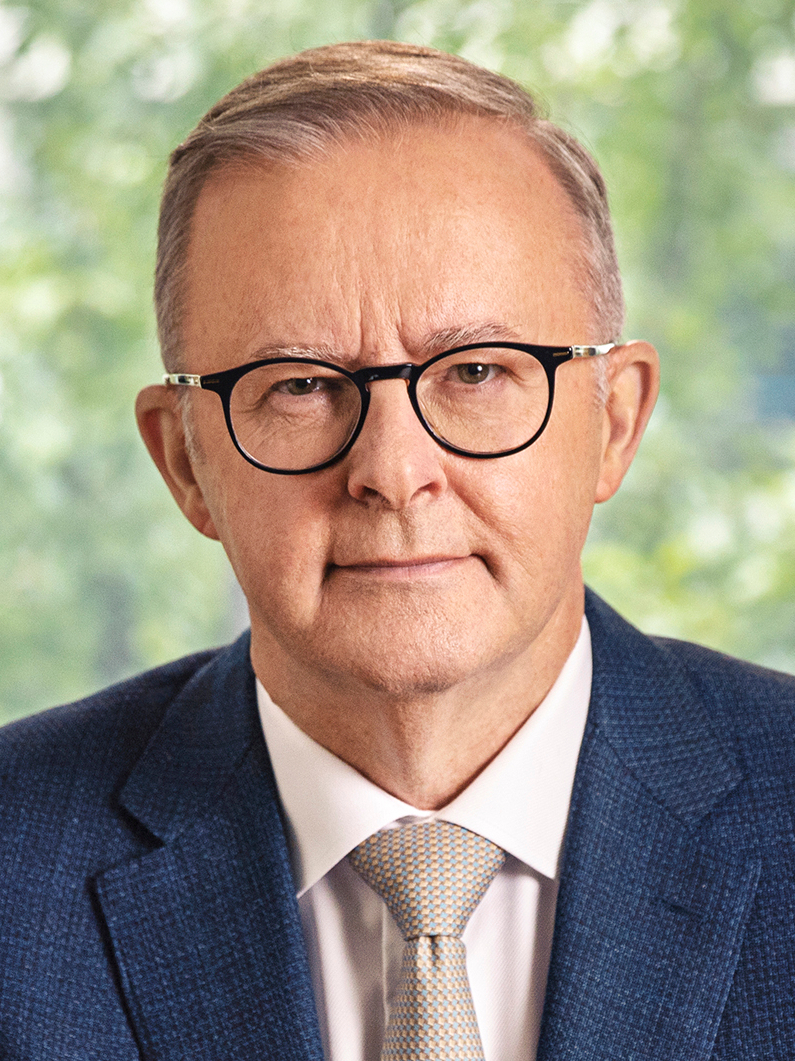

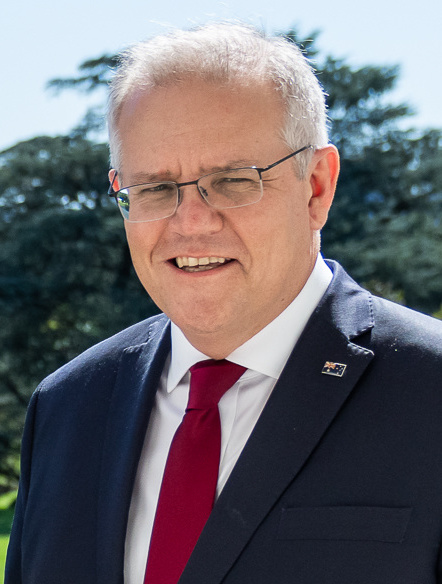

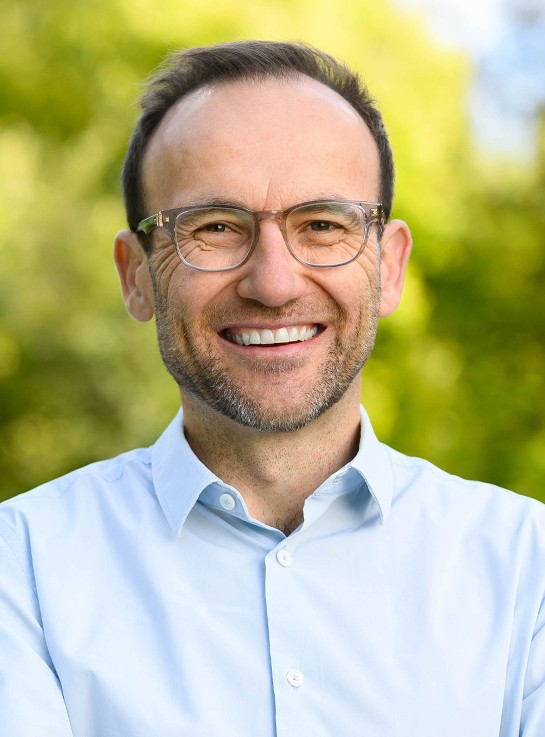

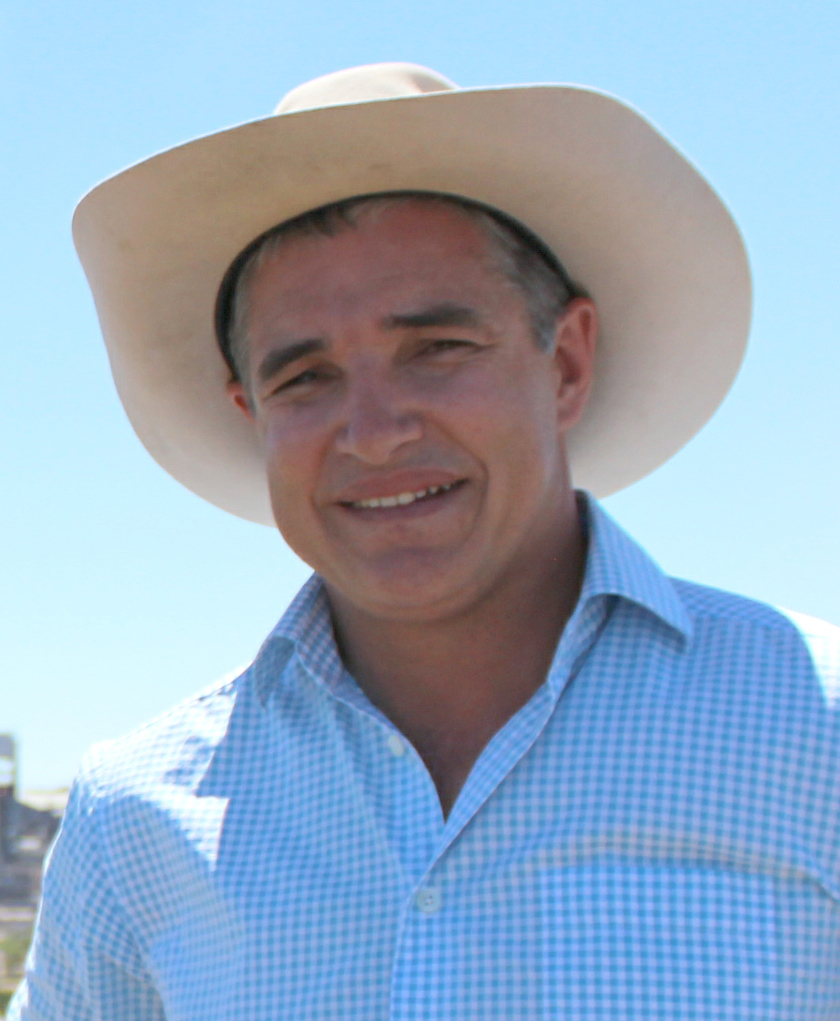

	First party	Second party	Third party
Leader	Anthony Albanese	Scott Morrison	Adam Bandt
Party	Labor	Coalition	Greens
Leader since	30 May 2019	24 August 2018	4 February 2020
Leader's seat	Grayndler (NSW)	Cook (NSW)	Melbourne (Vic.)
Last election	68 seats	77 seats	1 seat
Seats before	67 (Note: Excludes the seat of Spence, held by Labor until MP Nick Champion's resignation in February 2022. A by-election was not held before the election.)	75 (Note: Craig Kelly resigned from the Liberal Party in February 2021 and George Christensen resigned from the Liberal National Party in April 2022.)	1
Seats won	77	58	4
Seat change	▲9	▼19	▲3
Primary vote	4,776,030	5,233,334	1,795,985
Percentage	32.58%	35.70%	12.25%
Swing	▼0.76	▼5.73	▲1.85
TPP	52.13%	47.87%
TPP swing	▲3.66	▼3.66
	Fourth party	Fifth party
Leader	Robbie Katter	No leader
Party	Katter's Australian	Centre Alliance
Leader since	3 February 2020	N/A
Leader's seat	Did not stand (Note: Robbie Katter was party leader and member for Traeger in the Queensland Legislative Assembly but did not contest the federal election.)	N/A
Last election	1 seat	1 seat
Seats before	1	1
Seats won	1	1
Seat change	Steady	Steady
Primary vote	55,863	36,500
Percentage	0.38%	0.25%
Swing	▼0.11	▼0.08
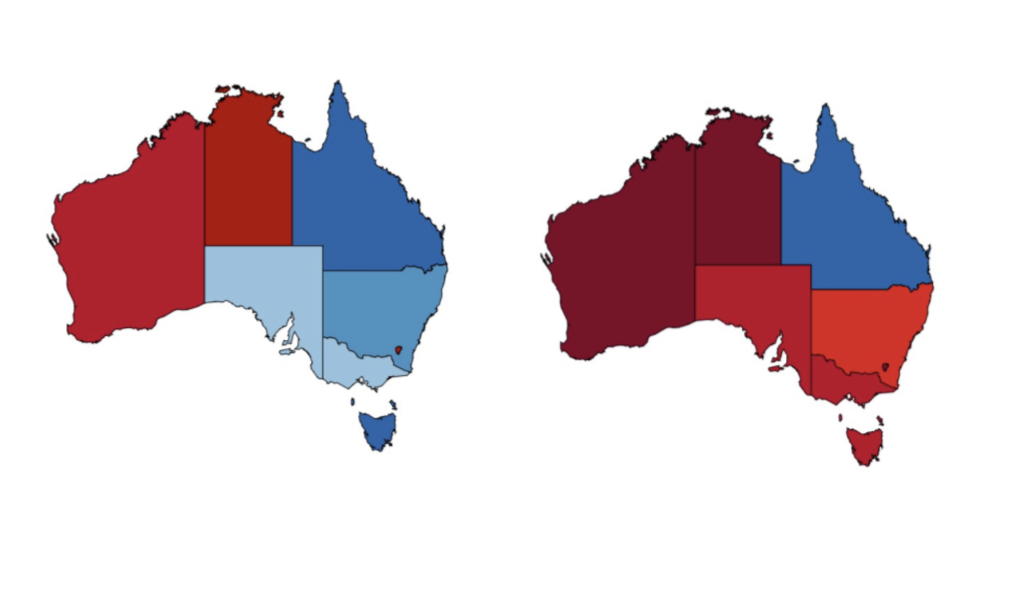
Prime Minister before election
Scott Morrison
Liberal/National coalition
Prime Minister after election
Anthony Albanese
Labor

A federal election was held on 21 May 2022 to elect members of the 47th Parliament of Australia. The incumbent Liberal–National Coalition government, led by Prime Minister Scott Morrison, sought to win a fourth consecutive term in office but was defeated by the Labor Party, led by Opposition Leader Anthony Albanese. Up for election were all 151 seats in the lower house, the House of Representatives, as well as 40 of the 76 seats in the upper house, the Senate. The voter turnout of 89.82% in this election was the lowest in modern history, falling below 90% for the first time since 1922, prior to the introduction of compulsory voting in Australia.

The Labor Party achieved a majority government for the first time since 2007, winning 77 seats in the House of Representatives. Albanese was sworn in as Prime Minister on 23 May 2022, becoming the fourth Labor leader to win government from opposition since World War II, after Gough Whitlam in 1972, Bob Hawke in 1983, and Kevin Rudd in 2007. Every state and territory except Tasmania swung to Labor on a two-party-preferred basis. The largest two-party preferred swing was in Western Australia (10.6%), where Labor won a majority of seats for the first time since 1990. The Coalition suffered severe losses, winning 58 seats, its lowest share in the House of Representatives since 1946, the first federal election contested by the Liberal Party. On election night, Morrison conceded defeat and announced he would resign as Liberal leader, and was subsequently replaced by Peter Dutton.

While the Coalition was soundly defeated, Labor did not achieve a landslide victory, as a result of electoral successes by independent candidates and the Greens, with the crossbench swelling to 16 seats. Six formerly safe Liberal seats in urban and suburban areas, most held by the party and its predecessors for decades, were won by teal independents, unseating Liberal incumbents including Treasurer and Deputy Liberal Leader Josh Frydenberg. The Liberals also suffered large swings in a number of suburban seats that had long been reckoned as Liberal heartland. The Greens increased their vote share and won four seats, gaining three seats in inner-city Brisbane, the first time in the party's history it won more than one seat in the lower house. The combined major party vote for Labor and the Coalition was the lowest on record at 68.3%, while the minor party and independent vote was at its highest at 31.7%. Compared to 2019, Labor's primary vote dropped much less than the Coalition's, although Labor nevertheless recorded its lowest primary vote since either 1903 or 1934, depending on whether the Lang Labor vote is included.

In the Senate, Labor won 15 seats and retained its 26 seats overall in the chamber, while the Coalition fell to 32 seats, a four-seat drop from the previous parliament. The Greens won a seat in every state, an increase of 3 for a total of 12 seats overall, the party's largest ever representation in the Senate. One Nation returned its leader Pauline Hanson in Queensland to retain 2 seats overall, while the Jacqui Lambie Network won an additional seat in Tasmania to have 2 seats. In the Australian Capital Territory (ACT), independent candidate David Pocock won the second of two seats, the first time an ACT senator was not a Labor or Liberal party member. Lastly, Ralph Babet of the United Australia Party won the sixth seat in Victoria. Labor required 13 votes from a crossbench of 18 (including 12 Greens) to ensure passage of legislation not supported by the Coalition.

== Background ==
=== Previous election ===
At the previous election in May 2019, the Liberal–National Coalition, led by Scott Morrison, formed a government after winning 77 seats in the House of Representatives, enough for a three-seat majority, whilst Labor claimed 68 seats and remained in opposition. A further six seats were won by other parties and independents, one each to the Greens, Centre Alliance, and Katter's Australian Party, and the remaining three by independents forming the crossbench. In the Senate, the Coalition made modest gains in most states and increased their share of seats to 35 overall, whilst Labor remained steady on 26, the Greens likewise on 9, One Nation and Centre Alliance down to 2 each, and Jacqui Lambie and Cory Bernardi's minor parties with 1 seat each. This meant the Coalition required four additional votes to pass legislation.

=== Composition of parliament ===
The 46th Parliament was inaugurated on 2 July 2019. By this time, the Labor Party had elected a new leader, replacing the outgoing Bill Shorten with Anthony Albanese. In the Senate, Cory Bernardi's resignation in January 2020 allowed the Coalition to replace him with a Liberal member, increasing their share of seats in the Senate to 36. They retained this figure until Northern Territory senator Sam McMahon resigned from the Country Liberal Party in January 2022, four months before the election. She joined the Liberal Democratic Party on 8 April 2022.

In the House of Representatives, two Coalition MPs (Llew O'Brien and Darren Chester) departed their respective party-room caucuses, though retained their membership of the Morrison government. The government's share of seats in the House dropped when Craig Kelly, the member for Hughes, left the Liberal Party in August 2021 to become an independent and sit on the crossbench. This left the government with a one-seat majority (76 out of 151), though considering the position of the Speaker, who is obliged not to vote to create a majority where none is present, the government functioned from this point to the election in technical-minority status. On 7 April 2022, three days prior to the election being called, Liberal National Party MP George Christensen announced his resignation from the party and became an independent, dropping the government to 75 seats at the end of the parliamentary term.

There were two by-elections in the 46th parliament, both in 2020 in the seats of Eden-Monaro and Groom; in both instances, the by-elections were won by the incumbent party. Nick Champion resigned from the House of Representatives in February 2022 to contest the South Australian state election. A by-election was not held for his seat of Spence as it would be too close to the federal election.

=== Events of the 46th Parliament ===
Throughout the duration of the 46th Parliament, Scott Morrison remained Prime Minister and leader of the Liberal Party, and in so doing he became the first prime minister to serve a full term without facing a leadership spill since John Howard (1996–2007). Deputy Prime Minister and National Party leader Michael McCormack was challenged twice by his predecessor Barnaby Joyce, unsuccessfully in February 2020 and successfully in June 2021.

Key events during the second term and first full term of the Morrison government included the Black Summer bushfires, the ongoing COVID-19 pandemic, the Parliament House sexual misconduct allegations, and the formation of the AUKUS security pact. Morrison won praise for his response to the COVID-19 pandemic in 2020, including launching the National Cabinet and JobKeeper programs, but he struggled to manage the vaccination roll out and testing regime as new variants of SARS-CoV-2 emerged. He faced further criticism for holidaying in Hawaii during the Black Summer bush fires, being accused of lying by French President Emmanuel Macron in the aftermath of the AUKUS agreement, and lacking ambition on climate change during COP26.

The opposition Labor Party elected Anthony Albanese as party leader unopposed, 12 days after Bill Shorten lost the May 2019 election. The Albanese-led Opposition struggled to make an impact in the early days of the COVID-19 pandemic. His "most significant policy announcement" before 2022 was a commitment to reduce emissions by 43% by 2030 under a Labor government.

Australian Greens leader Richard Di Natale resigned in February 2020, replaced by the party's only lower house MP Adam Bandt, who was elected unopposed. Among minor parties, controversial figure Craig Kelly resigned from the Liberal Party and became the leader of Clive Palmer's United Australia Party in 2021.

=== Change in party registration rules ===
In September 2021, legislation was passed to amend the Commonwealth Electoral Act 1918 and tighten rules surrounding the registration of political parties. Changes to party registration rules were reportedly the effect of an increase of parties on the Senate ballot, which resulted in the requirement of magnifying sheets for some voters to read the ballot, and a perception that voters would be misled by names of some minor parties.

The first change was the increase of membership requirements for a party from 500 to 1,500. This resulted in the federal deregistration of non-parliamentary minor parties who could not prove they had at least 1,500 members, including the Christian Democratic Party and Democratic Labour Party in March 2022.

The second change was that parties cannot have names that were too similar to political parties registered before them. This meant that new parties are prevented from registering a party name or logo "too similar to an existing party's". As for existing registered parties, a party may also object to a similar name or logo used by another party, if the latter party was registered later than the former party. If the Australian Electoral Commission (AEC) is satisfied with the objection, it can uphold the objection, and the later-registered party will be registered within a month of the upholding, if an application to change the name or logo is not made or has been denied.

This "similar name" rule was used by the Liberal Party against the Liberal Democratic Party (LDP) and The New Liberals, with both objections upheld by the AEC. This forced The New Liberals to change its name to TNL to be registered and forced the LDP to apply to change its name to the Liberty and Democracy Party. The LDP then withdrew its name change application on 22 March 2022. As a result, on 1 April 2022, the AEC gave notice to the party that it would consider deregistering the party, giving one month for the party to appeal the notice. However, as the writs for the election were issued the following week on 11 April, the party register then would be "frozen" and this meant the party was allowed to contest the election with its current name.

The Labor Party also used the "similar name" rule against the Democratic Labour Party and the objection was upheld by the AEC, but the latter party was eventually deregistered for not meeting the membership number requirement.

=== Party preselection issues ===
Both the Labor Party and Liberal Party experienced preselection issues, where they were unable to finalise candidates for many of the seats or the Senate as late as early April 2022, less than two weeks before the election was called. This resulted in the intervention by the parties' national executives or nominated committees to select the candidates and bypassing local voting by rank-and-file members. The New South Wales state division of the Liberal Party was unable to finalise candidates for many seats by March 2022 due to the alleged failure of Morrison's representative Alex Hawke to attend internal Liberal Party nomination review committee meetings and COVID-19 complications resulting in the inability to elect the state executive in November 2020. This had forced the federal executive of the party to temporarily dissolve the state executive on two occasions (4 to 8 March, and 27 March to 2 April) under the party constitution, and set up a committee to intervene in preselection processes. The committee was made up of Morrison, New South Wales Premier and Liberal leader Dominic Perrottet and former party president Chris McDiven.

While the Liberal state executive was dissolved, the committee was allowed to "hand-pick" party candidates for the election and bypass local pre-selection ballots. It endorsed the preselection of Hawke, minister Sussan Ley and backbencher Trent Zimmerman in their seats on 6 March, and endorsed candidates on 2 April for nine key seats that the party was trying to win, including Warringah, Hughes, Eden-Monaro, and Parramatta. Some party members sought to challenge the legitimacy of the committee's preselection in court, which would overturn the preselection of Hawke, Ley, Zimmerman and the other nine candidates. On 5 April, the New South Wales Court of Appeal ruled that the court had no jurisdiction to make decisions relating to the constitutions of political parties, thereby ruling the preselection of the 12 candidates valid. The legal challenge was further brought into High Court of Australia for appeal but was dismissed on 8 April, two days before the election was called.

The preselection process in the Victorian branch of the Labor Party had been taken over by the Labor Party National Executive in June 2020 until 2023 as a result of branch-stacking allegations within the party. Voting rights of all members were suspended and candidates would be chosen by the National Executive. In early March 2022, the Labor Senate ticket for Victoria for the May federal election had still not yet been decided. It was reported that Senators Kimberley Kitching and Kim Carr might face preselection challenges and could lose preselection for the Senate ticket in the election. Kitching died from a heart attack a week later, and Carr later decided to retire from the election. On 28 March 2022, the National Executive was able to finalise two new candidates to replace Kitching and Carr, and another candidate for the Division of Holt.

Preselection issues in the Labor Party were not limited to the Victorian branch. On the same day as the replacements for Kitching and Carr were finalised, the National Executive "parachuted" Andrew Charlton into the Division of Parramatta in New South Wales, bypassing a local preselection with three candidates from diverse ethnic backgrounds. This prompted a backlash from local party members and the incumbent retiring Labor member for Parramatta Julie Owens.

=== Independents ===
In the 2013 federal election, the Voices for Indi organisation successfully backed independent candidate Cathy McGowan to defeat the incumbent Liberal member of parliament Sophie Mirabella in the Division of Indi. McGowan was reelected in 2016, retiring after two terms to be succeeded by fellow independent Helen Haines. McGowan's victory inspired the campaign of independent Zali Steggall in 2019, who defeated the Liberal former Prime Minister Tony Abbott in the seat of Warringah. In addition to Haines and Steggall's campaigns for reelection, the 2022 election saw the candidacy of several challengers who were in turn inspired by Steggall. Termed "teal independents" (denoting a mix of classical liberal blue and environmentalist green), these candidates contested in Liberal heartlands notably including Curtin, Goldstein, Kooyong, Mackellar, North Sydney and Wentworth. Each received funds from the political fundraising group Climate 200.

== Electoral system ==
Members of the House of Representatives are elected by instant-runoff voting, which in Australia is known as full preferential voting. Each electorate elects one member.

Senators are elected by single transferable vote and proportional representation. In states senators are elected from state-wide six-member districts, and in territories from territory-wide two-member districts.

Ballots are counted at least twice, at the polling place and, starting Monday night after election day, at counting centres.

== State of electorates ==
=== Redistribution ===
Map of the 151 electoral divisions to the House of Representatives (blank) in use for the 2022 federal election

The Australian Electoral Commission is required, one year after the first sitting day for a new House of Representatives, to determine the number of members to which each State and Territory is entitled. If the number in any state changes, a redistribution will be required in those states. A redistribution will be postponed if it would begin within one year of the expiration of the House of Representatives. Demographic statistics for December 2019 released by the Australian Bureau of Statistics on 18 June 2020 were used to calculate the determination. The population counts confirmed that the number of seats in the House of Representatives was to return to 150, with Victoria gaining a seat (39), and Western Australia (15) and the Northern Territory (1) losing a seat each.

The abolition of the Northern Territory's second seat in the determination was controversial. Labor Party senators Malarndirri McCarthy and Don Farrell put forward a private senator's bill which would guarantee the Northern Territory a minimum two seats in the House of Representatives, with the bill referred to the Joint Standing Committee on Electoral Matters. In July 2020, election analyst Antony Green proposed to the Joint Standing Committee on Electoral Matters that the "harmonic mean method" be used to calculate the electoral representation entitlements for the territories. Green also blogged on the history of representation and its applications to states and territories in light of the 2020 redistribution and his advocacy proved persuasive. In October 2020, deputy prime minister Michael McCormack gave an assurance that the government and opposition would combine to overrule the AEC and maintain the Northern Territory's level of representation. The mechanism by which this would be achieved was unclear, however, with Senator Mathias Cormann stating that a two-seat minimum for the territories would be legislated. Mandating a minimum number of seats for the Northern Territory but not the Australian Capital Territory was seen as potentially inequitable, though the ACT's level of representation was not under threat. A 2003 report had also recommended against adopting mandatory minimum entitlements to seats in the House of Representatives for either of the territories.

Ultimately, the Joint Standing Committee recommended "enacting a harmonic mean for allocating seats between states and territories, with appropriate public explanation to build understanding for the reform". The Parliament passed the Electoral Amendment (Territory Representation) Act 2020 on 9 December 2020, amending the Commonwealth Electoral Act 1918 to use the harmonic mean method for determining representative entitlements for territories relative to states. Consequently, the Northern Territory will retain two seats in the House of Representatives at the next election, an outcome achieved without legislating any mandatory minimum level of representation.

December 2020 determination
State	Seats	Change
New South Wales	47	Steady
Victoria	39	▲1
Queensland	30	Steady
Western Australia	15	▼1
South Australia	10	Steady
Tasmania	5	Steady
Australian Capital Territory	3	Steady
Northern Territory	2	Steady
Total	151	Steady

In March 2021, the AEC published its proposal for this redistribution, involving the abolition of the Division of Stirling in Western Australia, the creation of the new Division of Hawke in Victoria (named for former Prime Minister Bob Hawke), and the renaming of the existing Division of Corangamite to the Division of Tucker (in honour of Margaret Tucker, "a Yorta Yorta woman, for her significant work to create a more equal and understanding society for Aboriginal people"). When the AEC published its final determinations in June 2021, the abolition of Stirling and creation of Hawke were confirmed, but Corangamite would not be renamed to Tucker over concerns that it would be vandalised as "Fucker".

== Voter registration ==
Enrollment of eligible voters is compulsory. Voters must notify the AEC within 8 weeks of a change of address or after turning 18. The electoral rolls are closed for new enrollments or update of details about a week after the issue of writs for election. Enrollment is optional for 16- or 17-year-olds, but they cannot vote until they turn 18, and persons who have applied for Australian citizenship may also apply for provisional enrollment which takes effect on the granting of citizenship. A total of 17,228,900 people were enrolled to vote in the election, which meant that 96.8% of all eligible Australians were enrolled on the electoral roll.

== Election date ==
The constitutional and legal provisions that affect the choice of the election date include:

- Section 12 of the Constitution says: "The Governor of any State may cause writs to be issued for the election of Senators for that State."
- Section 13 of the Constitution provides that the election of senators shall be held in the period of twelve months before the places become vacant.
- Section 28 of the Constitution says: "Every House of Representatives shall continue for three years from the first sitting of the House, and no longer, but may be sooner dissolved by the Governor-General." Since the 46th Parliament of Australia opened on 2 July 2019, it will expire on 1 July 2022.
- Section 32 of the Constitution says: "The writs shall be issued within ten days from the expiry of a House of Representatives or from the proclamation of a dissolution thereof." Ten days after 1 July 2022 is 11 July 2022.
- Section 156(1) of the CEA says: "The date fixed for the nomination of the candidates shall not be less than 10 days nor more than 27 days after the date of the writ." Twenty-seven days after 11 July 2022 is 7 August 2022.
- Section 157 of the CEA says: "The date fixed for the polling shall not be less than 23 days nor more than 31 days after the date of nomination." Thirty-one days after 7 August 2022 is 7 September 2022, a Wednesday.
- Section 158 of the CEA says: "The day fixed for the polling shall be a Saturday." The Saturday before 7 September 2022 is 3 September 2022, which was the latest possible date for the lower house election.

=== Dissolution of parliament ===
The election was called by Morrison on 10 April 2022, when he visited the Governor-General advising the latter to prorogue Parliament and dissolve the House of Representatives. The Parliament was then prorogued and the House of Representatives dissolved the next morning.

== Election timeline ==
On 10 April 2022, the office of the Governor-General released documents relating to the calling of the election. The documents set out a timeline of key dates for the election.

- 11 April – 9:29 am: Prorogation of the 46th Parliament
- 11 April – 9:30 am: Dissolution of the House of Representatives
- 11 April – Issue of writs
- 18 April – Close of electoral rolls
- 21 April – Close of candidate nominations
- 22 April – Declaration of nominations
- 9 May – Early voting commences
- 18 May – Close of postal vote applications
- 21 May – Polling day; commencement of terms for territory senators
- 13 June – Last day for receipt of declaration votes
- 28 June – Return of writs (last day)
- 1 July – Commencement of terms for state senators

The election period included three national public holidays: Good Friday (15 April), Easter Monday (18 April), and Anzac Day (25 April), as well as May Day and Labour Day in Northern Territory and Queensland, respectively, both falling on 2 May.

== Campaign events ==
=== Leaders' debates ===
2022 Australian federal election debates
No.	Date and time	Organiser	Location	Moderator	Source
1	20 April 2022; 7:00 pm AEST	Sky News Australia, The Courier-Mail	Brisbane Cricket Ground, Brisbane	Kieran Gilbert	
2	8 May 2022; 8:30 pm AEST	Nine Network	Channel 9 Studios, Sydney	Sarah Abo	
3	11 May 2022; 9:10 pm AEST	Seven Network, The West Australian	Channel Seven Studio, Sydney	Mark Riley	

The first leaders' debate was held at the Gabba in Brisbane in front of 100 undecided voters. Moderated by Sky News reporter Kieran Gilbert, Albanese was declared the winner, with 40 votes to Morrison's 35 and 25 still undecided. The first debate had 415,000 viewers.

The second leaders' debate was held at the Nine Studios in Sydney on 8 May. The debate was moderated by 60 Minutes journalist, Sarah Abo, with Channel 9 political editor Chris Uhlmann, Sydney Morning Herald chief political correspondent David Crowe and radio host Deb Knight asking questions of the leaders. The debate was broadcast nationwide on the Nine Network's main free-to-air channel, the network's streaming service 9Now, and the websites of the newspapers owned by the network: The Age and The Sydney Morning Herald. The winner of the debate was to be decided through a viewer poll hosted on Channel 9's website. Although 49% of viewers preferred Albanese to be the better prime minister compared to 45% preferring Morrison, the debate was a 50–50 draw. Channel 9's moderation of the debate was subject to widespread criticism, with both Morrison and Albanese shouting over the top of one another and the moderator, and for the technical issues experienced by a web page run by Channel 9 to gather audience opinion. It was a ratings success, drawing in 641,000 viewers.

The third and final leaders' debate was held on 11 May on Channel Seven, whose political editor Mark Riley moderated the debate. To determine the winner of the debate, 150 undecided voters were surveyed in key electorates around the country. Albanese was victorious with 50% of the vote, with Morrison getting 34% of the vote, and 16% remaining undecided. Seven's debate was viewed by 811,000 people, the highest viewership of all three debates.

The Australian Broadcasting Corporation (ABC) pushed for a debate on their free-to-air channel, radio, and websites in the lead-up to polling day, which Morrison refused, as well as Liberal Party federal director Andrew Hirst, who gave no explanation. Morrison and Albanese accepted a debate on Channel Seven rather than on the ABC.

=== Campaign ===
- 11 April: Labor Opposition Leader Anthony Albanese was unable to state the cash or unemployment rates in response to a question by a journalist. The question was widely described as a 'gotcha' question, and set-off a debate about the use of such questions.
- 13 April:
  - Labor said they would not commit to an increase in JobSeeker Payment after the election if they win.
  - A journalist asked Greens leader Adam Bandt what the current Wage Price Index was. Bandt told the journalist to "Google it, mate" and criticised a focus on "basic fact checking" rather than a "contest of ideas."
- 16 April:
  - Albanese said he would commit to an anti-corruption watchdog should Labor win the election.
  - The United Australia Party election campaign launch was held.
- 19 April: A debate was held at the National Press Club in Canberra between Minister for Agriculture and Northern Australia David Littleproud and Shadow Minister Julie Collins.
- 20 April:
  - Morrison continued to support his "captain's pick" to contest the seat of Warringah, Katherine Deves, despite her comments about transgender people and surrogacy.
  - First leaders' debate in Brisbane took place in front of 100 undecided voters, with Albanese declared the winner, with 40 votes to Morrison's 35 and 25 still undecided.
- 21 April: Albanese tested positive for COVID-19 and was unable to campaign in person for seven days.
- 22 April: Former Liberal foreign minister Julie Bishop and former defence chief Chris Barrie criticised the Morrison government for not doing enough to stop the Solomon Islands' security pact with China.
- 29 April:
  - Albanese came out of COVID-19 isolation.
  - The Australian Electoral Commission (AEC) warns Pauline Hanson's One Nation over voter fraud claims in a cartoon attacking Labor. After that Social media Facebook and TikTok took down those videos from Pauline Hanson's social media accounts.
- 30 April: Shadow minister Bill Shorten said Labor would hold a royal commission into Robodebt if elected.
- 1 May: The Labor election campaign launch was held in Perth.
- 4 May: A debate was held at the National Press Club in Canberra between Treasurer Josh Frydenberg and Shadow Treasurer Jim Chalmers.
- 5 May:
  - Pauline Hanson's One Nation party was criticised for running "ghost candidates" in several electorates, who are neither campaigning in the lead-up to the election nor have an online presence. Additionally, many do not live in the electorates they are contesting. One Nation committed to run candidates in all seats.
  - A debate was held at the National Press Club in Canberra between Minister for Defence Peter Dutton and Shadow Minister Brendan O'Connor.
- 8 May: Second leaders' debate took place in Sydney.
- 11 May:
  - Albanese said that he supported an increase of 5.1% to the minimum wage or an additional $1 an hour, tied to the inflation rate, with criticism from Morrison claiming that it would result in increasing interest rates.
  - Third leaders' debate took place in Sydney.
- 13 May: A debate was held at the National Press Club in Canberra between Minister for Foreign Affairs Marise Payne and Shadow Minister Penny Wong.
- 15 May: The Liberal election campaign launch was held in Brisbane, six days before the election, where Morrison promised to allow people to purchase their first home using funds from their superannuation.
- 18 May:
  - Albanese addressed the National Press Club. Morrison is the first prime minister since 1969 not to address the National Press Club in the final week of an election campaign.
  - The Australian Bureau of Statistics released the March 2022 Quarter Wage Price Index of 0.7%, or 2.4% annually.
- 20 May: Telephone voting rules changed to allow Australians who have tested positive with COVID-19 after 6 pm on 13 May to vote by telephone.
- 21 May (Election Day): Morrison advised in a press conference that a boat with refugees from Sri Lanka had been intercepted and turned back by the Australian Border Force. Hours before polling stations close, voters across the country received a text message about the boat turnback, urging them to vote Liberal for border security. The ABC later revealed on 27 May that the act followed a direct request from the Prime Minister's Office to the Border Force in revealing the operation before it was completed.

=== Preferences ===
Political parties recommend to voters how they should rank candidates through "how-to-vote cards" distributed by campaign volunteers near polling places. Parties often make agreements between themselves about these recommendations.

The Liberal National Party of Queensland recommended its voters direct their preferences to One Nation in the Senate and key Queensland seats. The Greens recommended its voters direct their preferences to Labor ahead of both the Coalition and minor right-wing parties such as the United Australia Party and One Nation for the House of Representatives and Senate, with preferences also recommended to be directed to independents endorsed by the various Voices groups in Liberal-held seats such as Goldstein, Mackellar, North Sydney, and Wentworth.

Pauline Hanson's One Nation said it would recommend that voters direct their preferences to Labor in five seats—North Sydney, Goldstein, Sturt, Longman, and Bass—all held by moderate Liberals. The United Australia Party recommended its voters direct their preferences to the Coalition ahead of Labor in marginal electorates, such as Bass, Chisholm, Dobell, Gilmore, Hunter and Macquarie, as well as all but four seats in Queensland, in addition to preferencing Liberal incumbents ahead of independent challengers in Mackellar, Wentworth, and Wannon. They also recommended its voters put incumbents last in their vote in Western Australia.

=== Newspaper endorsements ===
Most major Australian newspapers publish editorial endorsements in the week leading up to election day. As was the case at each of the past three elections, the majority of such editorials favoured the Coalition, with no papers having switched their endorsement from one party to another since 2019. Among the editorials supporting the Coalition were those of the two major national mastheads, The Australian and Australian Financial Review (AFR), and all but one of News Corp's capital city dailies and Sunday editions. Nine Entertainment Company's metropolitan dailies, such as The Sydney Morning Herald and the Melbourne-based The Age, both supported Labor, replicating their 2019 stance. Outside of the major media companies, editorials published by The Canberra Times, The Saturday Paper, and the Guardian Australia website opposed the Coalition; all three endorsed Labor, with the latter also supporting the Greens and teal independents.

Editors generally professed "despondency" at a perceived lack of "broad vision" on both sides, as well as a lack of attention to long-term issues like tax reform, housing affordability, stagnant productivity, and high public debt. Those endorsing the Coalition focused on Morrison's record rather than his platform. While chiding his propensity to "bulldoze his way through situations, clumsily handling issues that required a deft touch, a soft word or a steadier hand", The Australian credited Morrison's having "steered a government and his country through the most extraordinary, almost indescribably difficult period of our lifetimes", referring to low numbers of COVID-19 deaths and a strong economic recovery. The AFR contrasted this performance with a Labor "pitch dominated by talking points and unburdened by any substantial policy". Editors endorsing Labor focused on the issues of climate change and the establishment of a federal anti-corruption commission, judging the Coalition's efforts on both insufficient. For The Age, "a change of government is needed to begin restoring integrity to federal politics and ... face up to the challenge of climate change."

==== Weekend editions ====
Newspaper	City	Owner	Endorsement
The Saturday Paper	National	Schwartz Publishing	Labor
Sunday Mail	Adelaide	News Corp	Coalition
Sunday Mail	Brisbane	News Corp	Coalition
Sunday Herald-Sun	Melbourne	News Corp	Coalition
Sunday Telegraph	Sydney	News Corp	Coalition

==== Metropolitan daily newspapers ====
Newspaper	City	Owner	Endorsement
The Advertiser	Adelaide	News Corp	Coalition
The Age	Melbourne	Nine Entertainment	Labor
The Australian	National	News Corp	Coalition
Australian Financial Review	National	Nine Entertainment	Coalition
The Canberra Times	Canberra	Australian Community Media	Labor
The Courier-Mail	Brisbane	News Corp	Coalition
The Daily Telegraph	Sydney	News Corp	Coalition
Herald Sun	Melbourne	News Corp	Coalition
The Mercury	Hobart	News Corp	No endorsement
Northern Territory News	Darwin	News Corp	Labor
The Sydney Morning Herald	Sydney	Nine Entertainment	Labor
The West Australian	Perth	Seven West Media	Coalition

==== Online publications ====
Newspaper	City	Owner	Endorsement
Guardian Australia	National	Guardian Media Group	Labor
Guardian Australia	National	Guardian Media Group	Greens
Guardian Australia	National	Guardian Media Group	Teal independents
The Spectator Australia	National	The Spectator	Katter's Australian
The Spectator Australia	National	The Spectator	Liberal Democrats
The Spectator Australia	National	The Spectator	One Nation
The Spectator Australia	National	The Spectator	United Australia

==== Regional newspapers ====
Newspaper	City/town	Owner	Endorsement
Geelong Advertiser	Geelong	News Corp	Coalition
Newcastle Herald	Newcastle	Australian Community Media	Labor

== Candidates ==
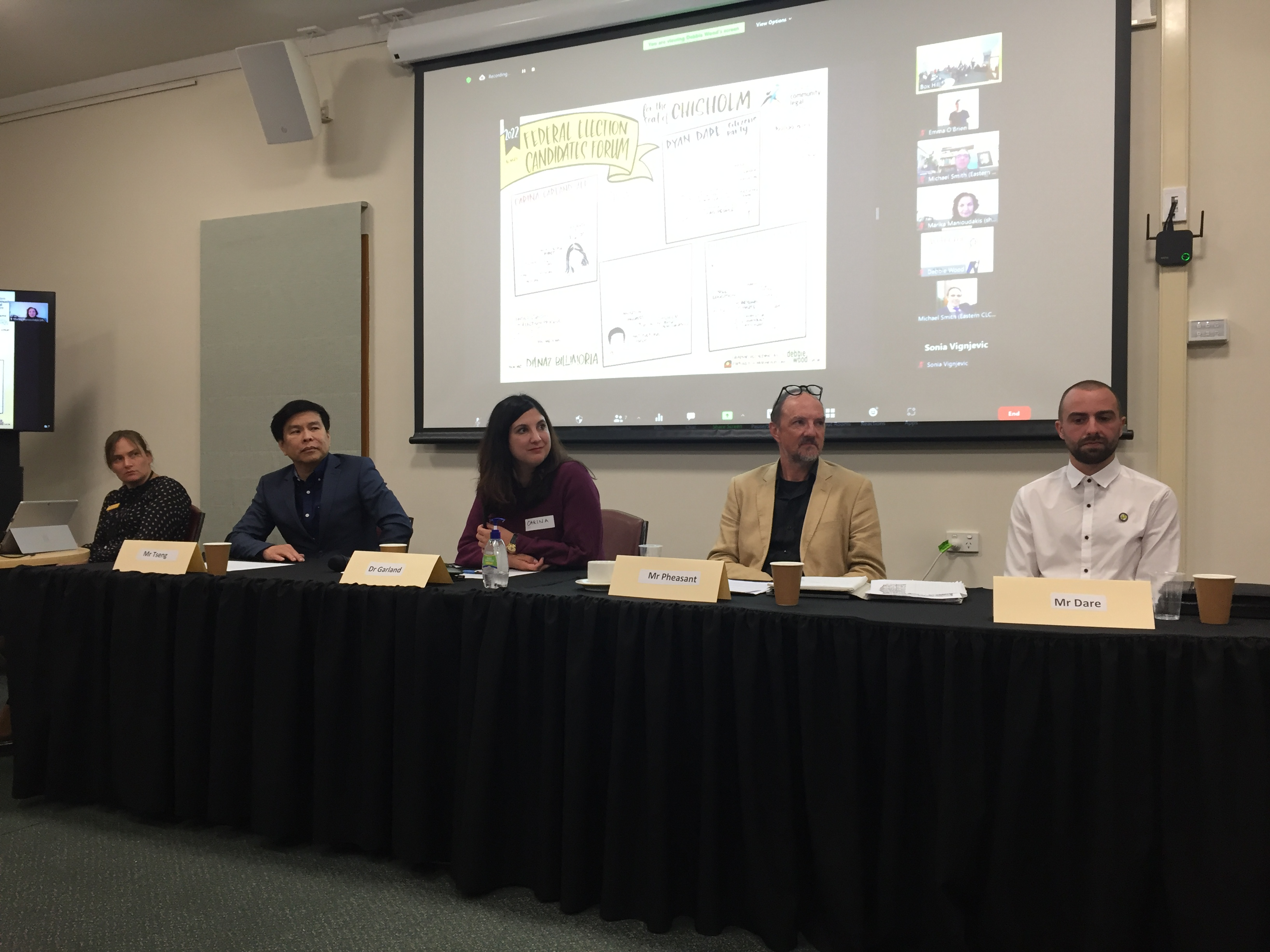
Some of the candidates for the Division of Chisholm at a candidates' forum

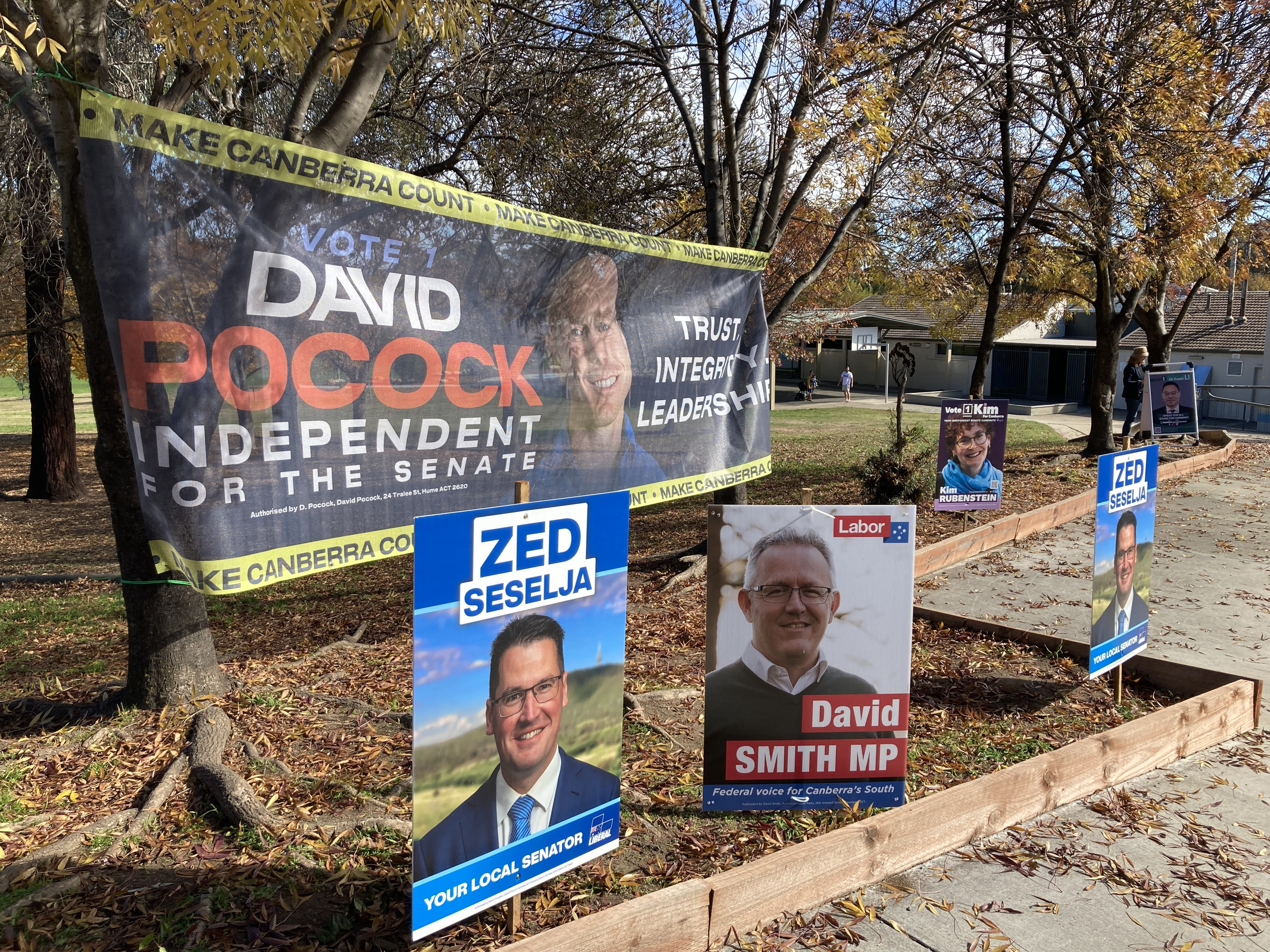
Corflutes and banners for candidates at a polling station in Canberra

Candidates for either house must have been formally nominated with the Electoral Commission. The nomination for a party-endorsed candidate must be signed by the Registered Officer of a party registered under the Electoral Act; 100 signatures of eligible voters are required for an independent candidate as per section 166 of the Commonwealth Electoral Act 1918. A candidate can nominate for only one electorate, and must pass a number of qualifications. The Electoral Legislation Amendment (Modernisation and Other Measures) Act 2019 came into effect on 1 March 2019. A deposit of $2,000 was required for a candidate for the House of Representatives or the Senate, which is refunded if the candidate is elected or gains at least 4% of the first preference vote. Between 10 and 27 days must be allowed after the issue of writs before the close of nominations. At the close of nominations a total of 1,624 candidates had stood for election, of which 1,203 were House of Representatives candidates and 421 were Senate candidates.

In February 2022, the Australian Security Intelligence Organisation revealed a failed attempt by the Chinese government to use a proxy to finance federal Labor candidates in New South Wales.

The 2022 election featured the largest number of Indigenous candidates in Australian history, with four running for the Coalition, eleven for Labor, seventeen for the Greens; and one candidate for the Socialist Alliance, seven candidates for the Indigenous-Aboriginal Party, one candidate for Katter's Australia Party, one candidate for One Nation, and one independent candidate. The Greens Victorian senate ticket were all Aboriginal.

=== Parties ===
The table below lists party representation in the 46th Parliament when it was prorogued on 11 April 2022.

Name		Ideology	Party leader	House seats	Senate seats
Coalition (Note: The Coalition formally comprises the Liberal Party and National Party. Federal parliamentary members of the Liberal National Party of Queensland and Country Liberal Party (Northern Territory) sit in the party room of either the Liberal or National parties according to the individual members' preference or internal party arrangements.)	Liberal Party	Liberal conservatism	Scott Morrison	75 / 151	35 / 76
Coalition	National Party	Conservatism	Barnaby Joyce	75 / 151	35 / 76
Labor Party		Social democracy Democratic socialism	Anthony Albanese	67 / 151	26 / 76
Greens		Green politics Left-wing populism	Adam Bandt	1 / 151	9 / 76
Pauline Hanson's One Nation		Right-wing populism	Pauline Hanson	0 / 151	2 / 76
Centre Alliance		Social liberalism	None	1 / 151	1 / 76
Katter's Australian Party		Agrarianism	None	1 / 151	0 / 76
United Australia Party		Right-wing populism	Craig Kelly	1 / 151	0 / 76
Jacqui Lambie Network		Social conservatism	Jacqui Lambie	0 / 151	1 / 76
Rex Patrick Team		South Australian Regionalism	Rex Patrick	0 / 151	1 / 76
Liberal Democratic Party		Classical liberalism	None (Note: John Humphreys was party president but did not contest the federal election.)	0 / 151	1 / 76
Independents (Note: Independents who sat in the House of Representatives as of the end of the parliamentary term were Andrew Wilkie, Helen Haines, Zali Steggall, and George Christensen.)		–	–	4 / 151	0 / 76

== Retiring members ==
The seat of Spence (SA) was vacant following the resignation of Nick Champion (Labor) on 22 February 2022 to contest the South Australian state election. A Senate seat in New South Wales was vacant following the resignation of Kristina Keneally (Labor) on 11 April 2022 to contest the lower house seat of Fowler in the election. A second Senate seat in Western Australia was initially vacant at the close of nominations following the resignation on 15 April 2022 of Ben Small (Liberal), who had discovered that he was ineligible on the grounds of dual citizenship. Having renounced his New Zealand citizenship, Small was re-appointed on 18 May 2022 and contested the election. George Christensen, previously a Nationals member, did not re-contest the seat of Dawson but ran instead for the Senate for One Nation.

The following Members of Parliament (MPs) and Senators did not contest the election.

=== Labor ===
- Sharon Bird MP (Cunningham, NSW) – announced retirement on 19 November 2021
- Anthony Byrne MP (Holt, Vic) – announced retirement on 3 March 2022
- Joel Fitzgibbon MP (Hunter, NSW) – announced retirement on 12 September 2021
- Chris Hayes MP (Fowler, NSW) – announced retirement on 24 March 2021
- Julie Owens MP (Parramatta, NSW) – announced retirement on 28 October 2021
- Warren Snowdon MP (Lingiari, NT) – announced retirement on 10 December 2020
- Senator Kim Carr (Vic) – announced retirement on 27 March 2022

=== Liberal ===
- John Alexander MP (Bennelong, NSW) – announced retirement on 12 November 2021
- Kevin Andrews MP (Menzies, Vic) – lost preselection on 31 January 2021
- Nicolle Flint MP (Boothby, SA) – announced retirement on 26 February 2021
- Greg Hunt MP (Flinders, Vic) – announced retirement on 2 December 2021
- Steve Irons MP (Swan, WA) – announced retirement on 24 September 2021
- Andrew Laming MP (Bowman, Qld) – announced retirement on 28 March 2021, disendorsed on 12 April 2021 after refusal to withdraw preselection nomination
- Christian Porter MP (Pearce, WA) – announced retirement on 1 December 2021
- Tony Smith MP (Casey, Vic) – announced retirement on 14 July 2021
- Senator Concetta Fierravanti-Wells (NSW) – lost preselection 26 March 2022, announced retirement 2 April 2022

=== Nationals ===
- Damian Drum MP (Nicholls, Vic) – announced retirement on 3 December 2021
- Ken O'Dowd MP (Flynn, Qld) – announced retirement on 5 January 2021

== Opinion polling ==
Aggregate data of voting intention from all opinion polling since the last federal election. Local regression trends for each party, weighted by sample size, are shown as solid lines.

== Results ==
=== House of Representatives ===
Government (77) Labor (77) Opposition (58) Coalition Liberal (27) LNP (Qld) (21) (Note: 15 LNP MPs sit in the Liberal party room and 6 in the National party room) National (10) Crossbench (16) Independent (10) Greens (4) Centre Alliance (1) Katter's Australian (1)

House of Representatives (IRV) – Turnout: 89.82% (CV)
Party	Primary vote			Seats	
Party	Votes	%	Swing (pp)	Seats	Change
Liberal	3,502,713	23.89	−4.28	27	▼17
Liberal National (Qld)	1,172,515	8.00	−0.67	21	▼2
National	528,442	3.60	−0.72	10	Steady
Country Liberal (NT)	29,664	0.20	−0.07	0	Steady
Liberal/National Coalition	5,233,334	35.70	−5.73	58	▼19
Labor	4,776,030	32.58	−0.76	77	▲9
Greens	1,795,985	12.25	+1.85	4	▲3
One Nation	727,464	4.96	+1.88	0	Steady
United Australia Party	604,536	4.12	+0.69	0	Steady
Katter's Australian	55,863	0.38	−0.11	1	Steady
Centre Alliance	36,500	0.25	−0.08	1	Steady
Independents	776,169	5.29	+1.92	10	▲7
Other	653,161	4.46	−6.17	0	Steady
Total	14,659,042	100.00	–	151	Steady
Two-party-preferred vote
Labor	7,642,161	52.13	+3.66		
Liberal/National Coalition	7,016,881	47.87	−3.66		
Invalid/blank votes	802,337	5.19	–0.35	–	–
Turnout	15,461,379	89.82	–2.07	–	–
Registered voters	17,228,900	–	–	–	–
Source: AEC tally room statistics for votes and seats.

Popular vote
Coalition	35.69%
Labor	32.58%
Greens	12.25%
One Nation	4.96%
United Australia	4.12%
Independents	5.29%
Others	5.11%

Two-party-preferred vote
Labor	52.13%
Coalition	47.87%

Seats
Labor	50.99%
Coalition	38.41%
Independents	6.62%
Greens	2.65%
Centre Alliance	0.66%
Katter's Australian Party	0.66%

=== Senate ===
Government (26) Labor (26) Opposition (32) Coalition Liberal (23) LNP (Qld) (5) (Note: 3 LNP senators sit in the Liberal party room and 2 in the National party room) National (3) CLP (NT) (1) (Note: the CLP senator, Jacinta Nampijinpa Price, sits in the National party room) Crossbench (18) Greens (12) One Nation (2) Lambie Network (2) United Australia (1) Independent (1)

Senate (STV) – Turnout 90.47% (CV)
Party	First-preference votes	%	±	Seats			
Party	First-preference votes	%	±	Seats won	Not up	New total	+/-
Liberal/National (joint)	2,997,004	19.93	–1.66	5	6	11	▼1
Liberal National (QLD)	1,061,638	7.06	–0.67	2	3	5	▼1
Liberal	1,052,571	7.00	–1.24	7	8	15	▼2
Country Liberal (NT)	32,846	0.22	–0.04	1	0	1	Steady
National	3,969	0.03	–0.14	0	0	0	Steady
Liberal/National Coalition	5,148,028	34.24	–3.75	15	17	32	▼4
Labor	4,525,598	30.09	+1.30	15	11	26	Steady
Greens	1,903,403	12.66	+2.47	6	6	12	▲3
One Nation	644,744	4.29	–1.11	1	1	2	Steady
United Australia	520,520	3.46	+1.10	1	0	1	▲1
Legalise Cannabis	501,421	3.33	+1.53	0	0	0	Steady
Liberal Democrats	340,132	2.26	+1.10	0	0	0	Steady
Animal Justice	240,696	1.60	+0.34	0	0	0	Steady
David Pocock	60,406	0.40	+0.40	1	0	1	▲1
Lambie Network	31,203	0.21	+0.00	1	1	2	▲1
Patrick Team	23,425	0.16	+0.16	0	0	0	▼1 (Note: Rex Patrick was appointed to the Senate in 2017 as a member of the Nick Xenophon Team, which became Centre Alliance however the party did not contest this election. The other Centre Alliance senator, Stirling Griff, ran with Nick Xenophon in Group O.)
Others	1,101,082	7.32		0	0	0	Steady
Total	15,040,658	100.00	–	40	36	76	–
Invalid/blank votes	532,003	3.42	−0.39	–	–	–	–
Turnout	15,572,661	90.47	–2.01	–	–	–	–
Registered Voters	17,228,900	–	–	–	–	–	–
Source: AEC for votes, ABC for seats

== Seats changing hands ==
Members in italics did not re-contest their House of Representatives seats at this election.

Seat	Pre-election			Swing	Post-election		
Seat	Party	Member	Margin	Swing	Margin	Member	Party
Bennelong, NSW	Liberal	John Alexander	6.9	7.9	1.0	Jerome Laxale	Labor
Boothby, SA	Liberal	Nicolle Flint	1.4	4.7	3.3	Louise Miller-Frost	Labor
Brisbane, QLD	Liberal National	Trevor Evans	4.9 (v ALP)	N/A	3.7 (v LNP)	Stephen Bates	Greens
Chisholm, VIC	Liberal	Gladys Liu	0.5	6.9	6.4	Carina Garland	Labor
Curtin, WA	Liberal	Celia Hammond	14.0 (v ALP)	N/A	1.3 (v LIB)	Kate Chaney	Independent
Fowler, NSW	Labor	Chris Hayes	14.0 (v LIB)	N/A	1.6 (v ALP)	Dai Le	Independent
Goldstein, VIC	Liberal	Tim Wilson	7.8 (v ALP)	N/A	2.9 (v LIB)	Zoe Daniel	Independent
Griffith, QLD	Labor	Terri Butler	2.9 (v LNP)	N/A	10.5 (v LNP)	Max Chandler-Mather	Greens
Hasluck, WA	Liberal	Ken Wyatt	5.8	11.9	6.0	Tania Lawrence	Labor
Higgins, VIC	Liberal	Katie Allen	3.7	4.7	2.1	Michelle Ananda-Rajah	Labor
Kooyong, VIC	Liberal	Josh Frydenberg	5.6 (v GRN)	N/A	2.9 (v LIB)	Monique Ryan	Independent
Mackellar, NSW	Liberal	Jason Falinski	13.2 (v ALP)	N/A	2.5 (v LIB)	Sophie Scamps	Independent
North Sydney, NSW	Liberal	Trent Zimmerman	9.3 (v ALP)	N/A	2.9 (v LIB)	Kylea Tink	Independent
Pearce, WA	Liberal	Christian Porter	5.2	14.2	9.0	Tracey Roberts	Labor
Reid, NSW	Liberal	Fiona Martin	3.2	8.4	5.2	Sally Sitou	Labor
Robertson, NSW	Liberal	Lucy Wicks	4.2	6.5	2.3	Gordon Reid	Labor
Ryan, QLD	Liberal National	Julian Simmonds	6.0 (v ALP)	N/A	2.7 (v LNP)	Elizabeth Watson-Brown	Greens
Swan, WA	Liberal	Steve Irons	3.3	12.0	8.8	Zaneta Mascarenhas	Labor
Tangney, WA	Liberal	Ben Morton	9.5	11.9	2.4	Sam Lim	Labor
Wentworth, NSW	Liberal	Dave Sharma	1.3 (v IND)	N/A	4.2 (v LIB)	Allegra Spender	Independent

== Maps ==
First preference vote results

Two-candidate-preferred (final) results

Holds and gains by coalition

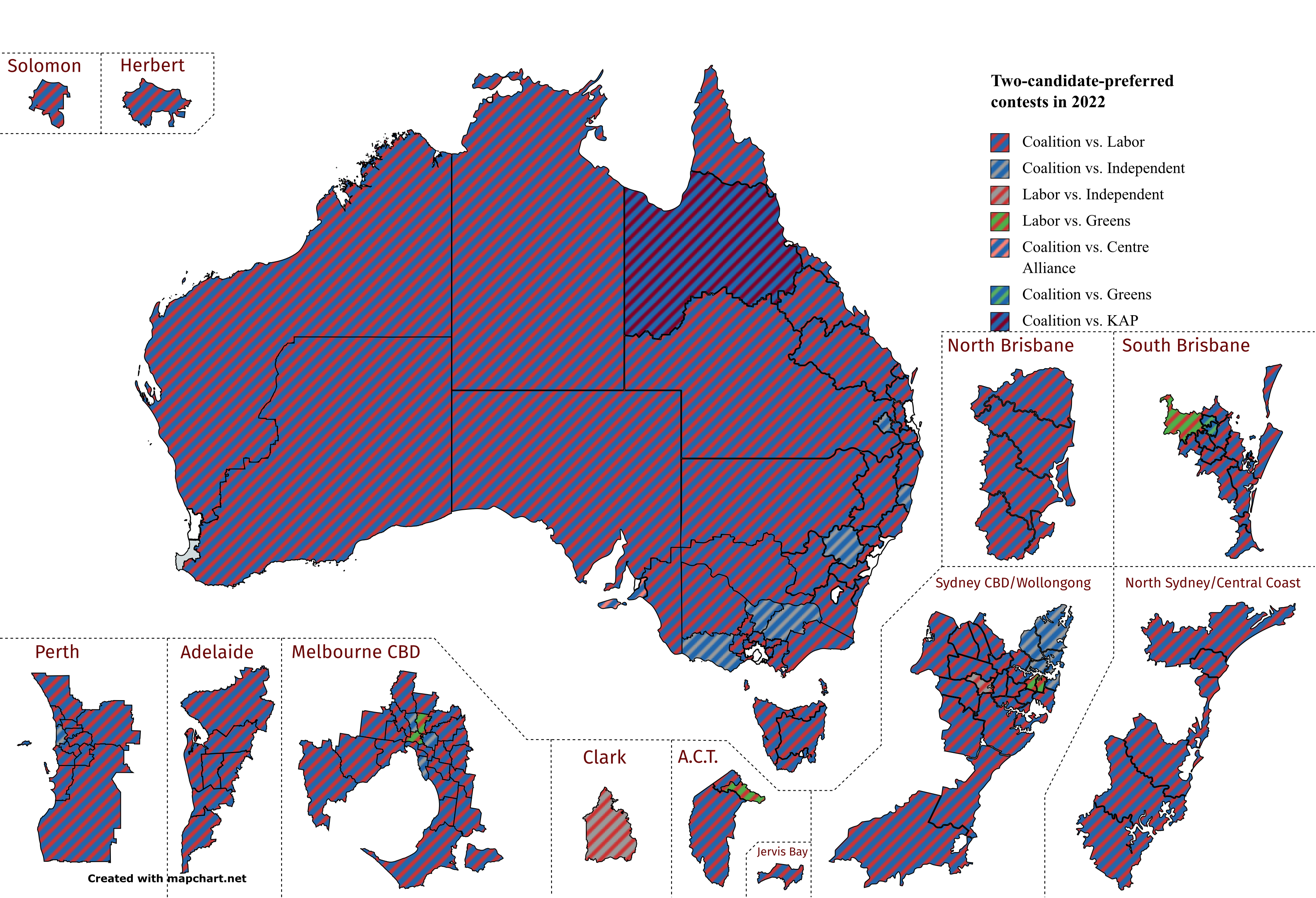
Two-candidate-preferred contests by electorate

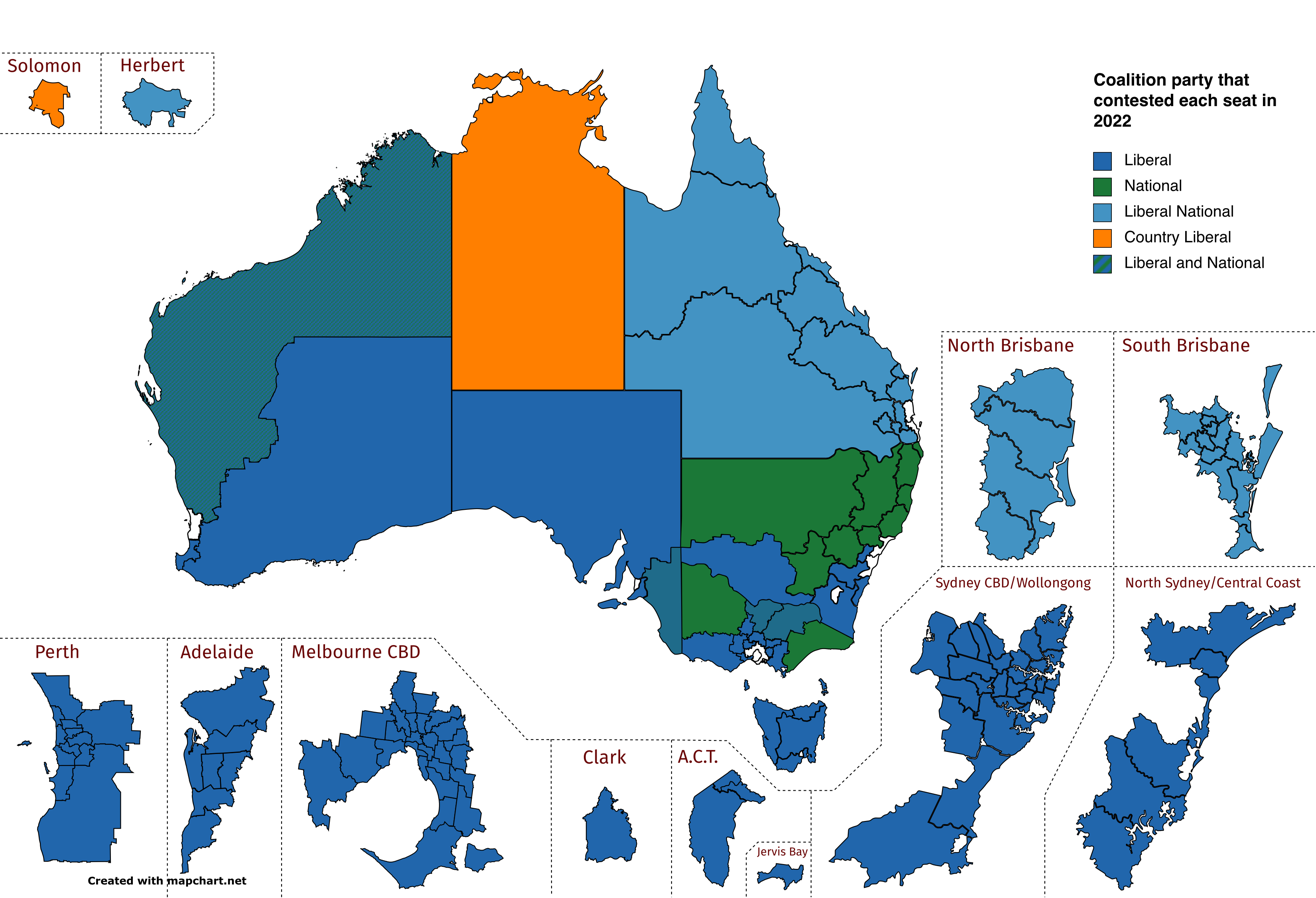
Coalition candidates by party in each electorate

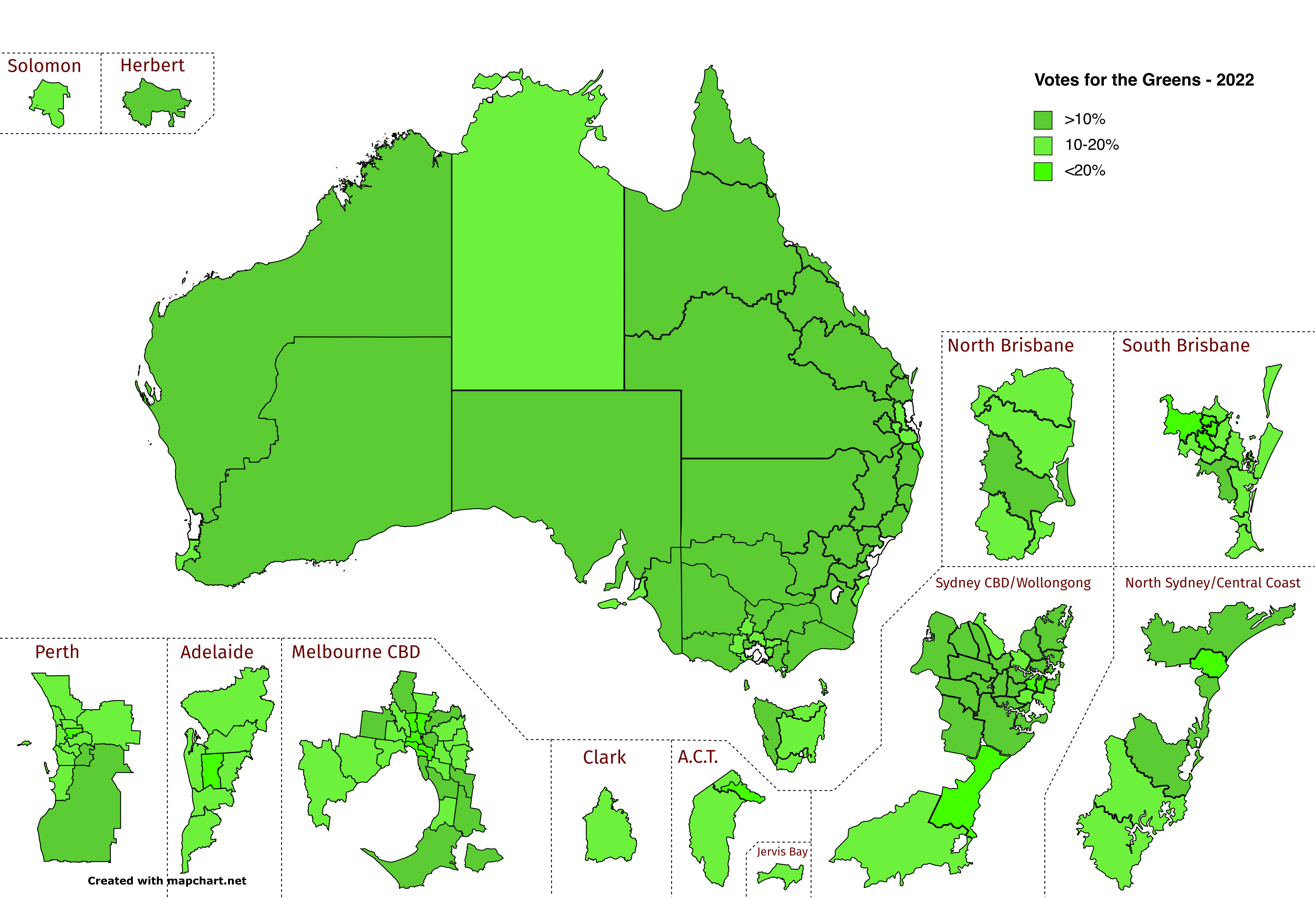
Greens vote share by electorate

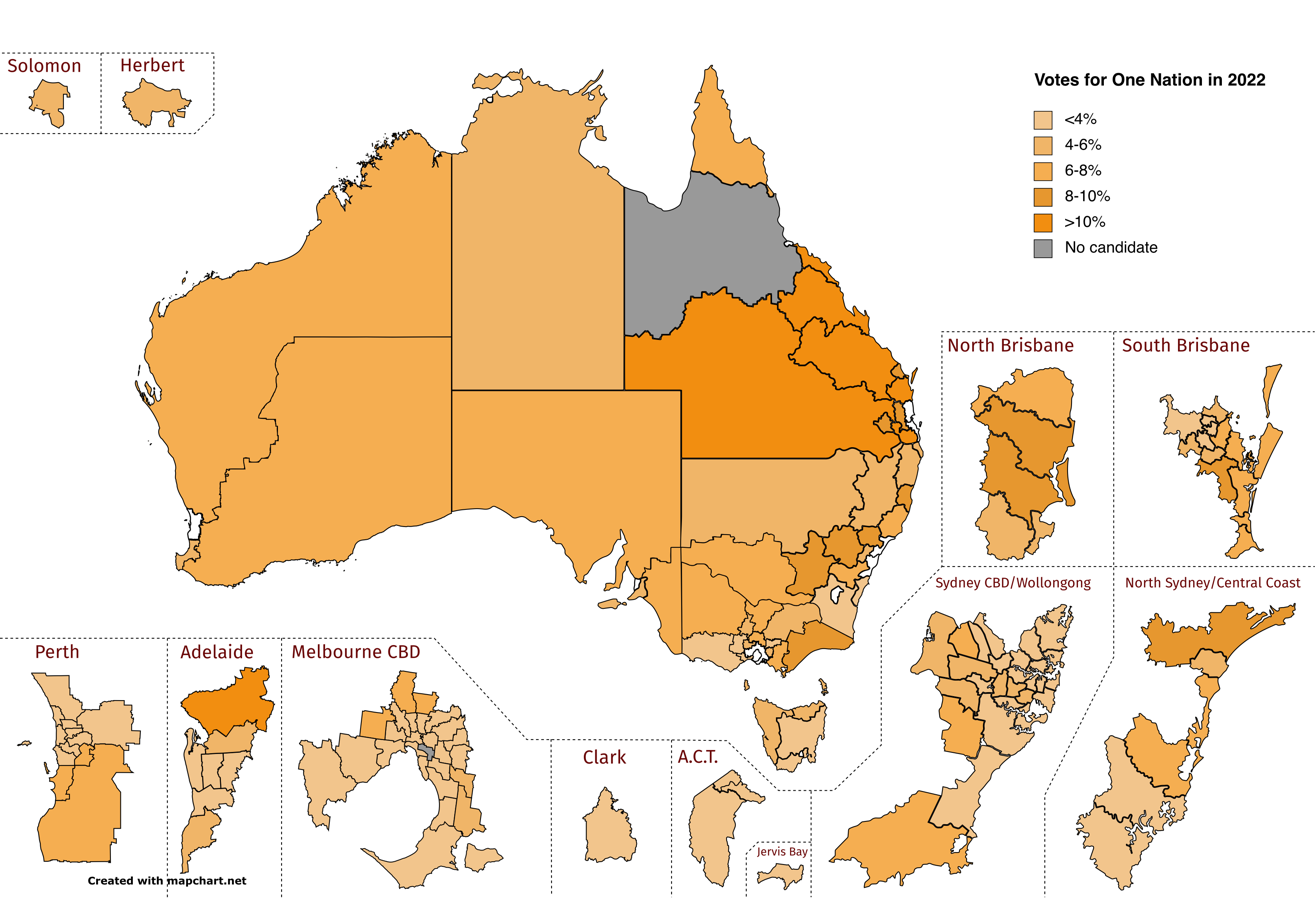
One Nation vote share by electorate

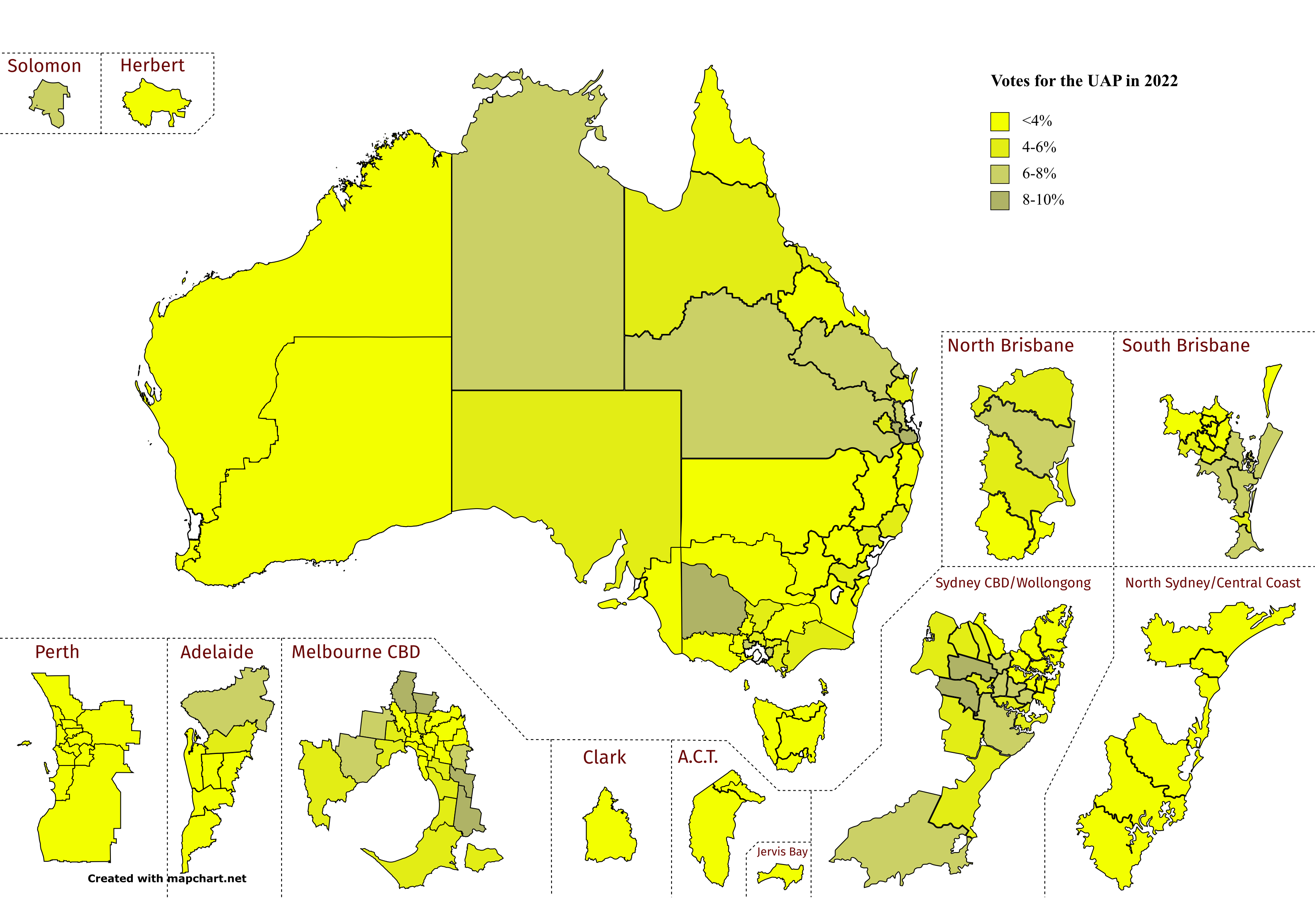
United Australia Party vote share by electorate

== Aftermath and reactions ==
=== Domestic reactions ===
Morrison conceded defeat and resigned as leader of the Liberal Party; his successor was later decided at the next Liberal party room meeting to be Peter Dutton; both of the two formerly contested against each other during the 2018 Liberal Party of Australia leadership spills.

Albanese claimed victory and acknowledged Morrison's concession. He thanked his supporters, his colleagues, and his team for the win. He pledged to fulfill the promise of the Uluru Statement from the Heart, not to leave anyone behind, and to unite Australia for a better future. He promised to end the climate wars and to commit to the pledges he has made during the election campaign.

Australian Greens leader Adam Bandt celebrated his party's historic three seat gains in Queensland, two from the Liberals and one from Labor. He called this a historic "greenslide" as he thanked a record number of people in Queensland who voted Greens for the first time in this election. Bandt was re-elected at the Greens' regular post-election leadership election and Mehreen Faruqi was elected as deputy leader, replacing Larissa Waters and Nick McKim who were elected as leader in the Senate and party whip respectively.

Two days after the election, Governor-General David Hurley swore in Albanese, deputy leader Richard Marles, Jim Chalmers, and Senators Penny Wong and Katy Gallagher as an interim five-person government. Although counting was still underway, the swearing-in was expedited due to an upcoming meeting of the Quadrilateral Security Dialogue. The five ministers divided all portfolios between them until the full ministry was sworn in. According to ABC News, Hurley would not have sworn in Albanese without assurances that Labor could provide stable government, as well as legal advice that this was the proper course of action. Marles served as Acting Prime Minister while Albanese was attending the Quadrilateral.

At his first press conference after being sworn in, Albanese announced that he received assurances that crossbenchers Rebekha Sharkie, Bob Katter, Andrew Wilkie, Helen Haines, and Zali Steggall would provide supply and would not support a no-confidence motion against the government.

This was the 27th and the last federal election under the reign of Elizabeth II, who died just four months later, after 70 years of service as the longest serving Australian monarch.

=== International reactions ===
Several world leaders issued statements congratulating Albanese on his victory.

- Canada: Prime Minister Justin Trudeau released an official statement congratulating Albanese on his victory.
- China: Premier Li Keqiang sent a message congratulating Albanese on his election win, ending two years of diplomatic freeze on a ministerial level between the two countries. He stated that China is ready to work with the new government and it is in the interests of both countries to have "sound and stable relations".
- Fiji: Prime Minister Frank Bainimarama congratulated Albanese and "welcomed" his plan for the Pacific "to put climate first". Leader of the People's Alliance, Sitiveni Rabuka, also congratulated Albanese and thanked Morrison.
- France: At a May 21 press conference, the then-outgoing foreign affairs minister Jean-Yves Le Drian said: "I can't stop myself from saying that the defeat of Morrison suits me very well." He was referencing Australia's cancellation of a French–Australian submarine deal under the Morrison government. President Emmanuel Macron also hinted at the deal when he called Albanese on 26 May, both vowing to "rebuild a bilateral relationship founded on trust and respect".
- India: Prime Minister Narendra Modi sent his congratulations to Albanese, highlighting his commitment to the Australia–India Comprehensive Strategic Partnership.
- Indonesia: President Joko Widodo congratulated Albanese on Twitter, saying that he looked forward to working with him on strengthening Australia–Indonesia relations through the Comprehensive Strategic Partnership and in particular the Indonesia–Australia Comprehensive Economic Partnership Agreement. Subsequently, Jokowi said he was honored to have received Albanese's visit, as Albanese later visited Indonesia for his first bilateral visit after being sworn as Australia's 31st Prime Minister. In addition, Albanese accepted Jokowi's invitation to attend the 2022 G20 Bali Summit held later in 2022.
- Japan: Prime Minister Fumio Kishida offered Albanese his spoken congratulations for assuming the post of prime minister, and thanked Albanese for flying over to Japan promptly after the election, to attend a Quad leaders summit also featuring the leaders of India and the United States.
- New Zealand: Prime Minister Jacinda Ardern congratulated Albanese, stating that she was looking forward "to working with him on a range of issues including supporting New Zealanders living in Australia, making trans-Tasman business even easier, deepening our partnership with our close friends in the Pacific, and advancing our interests on the world stage."
- Papua New Guinea: Prime Minister of Papua New Guinea James Marape congratulated Albanese's win. He also thanked Morrison for his support for Papua New Guinea.
- Singapore: Prime Minister Lee Hsien Loong sent a letter to Albanese congratulating his election win, citing their shared longstanding ties and expressed his desire to work with him to continue advancing Australia–Singapore relations.
- United Kingdom: Prime Minister Boris Johnson congratulated Albanese on Twitter, saying that he looks forward to working with him on strengthening Australia–United Kingdom relations on trade and AUKUS partnership. The leader of the UK Labour Party and opposition leader, Keir Starmer, congratulated Albanese for ending "almost a decade of stale conservative rule".
- United States: President Joe Biden called Albanese on 22 May, congratulating him and reaffirming the US' commitment towards their bilateral relationship with Australia. Ahead of the Quad summit taking place two days later, Biden appreciated Albanese's commitment towards the security alliance and his decision to participate in the summit.

Albanese also received messages of congratulations from the leaders of Bangladesh, Israel, Italy, the Netherlands, Pakistan, Samoa, Saudi Arabia, the Solomon Islands, Sri Lanka, and Vietnam.

== See also ==
- 2022 Liberal Party of Australia leadership election
- 2022 National Party of Australia leadership spill
- Post-election pendulum for the 2022 Australian federal election
- Albanese government
- First Albanese ministry
