= YXY =

YXY may refer to:

- ISO 639:yxy, language code for Yabula-Yabula, an extinct language of Australia
- Erik Nielsen Whitehorse International Airport, (IATA: YXY, ICAO: CYXY), in Whitehorse, Yukon, Canada
- yxy, mathematical notation used in inverse elements
