= Kwatkwat =

Indigenous Australian tribe

The Kwatkwat were an indigenous Australian tribe of the State of Victoria, though some scholars consider them part of the broader Yorta Yorta/Pangerang macrogroup. (Note: 'We do not think that much reliance can be placed on Tindale's classification in this area.')

== Country ==
According to Norman Tindale, the Kwatkwat's tribal territories cover roughly 1,800 square miles (4,700 km^{2}), running along the southern bank of the Murray River, in a stretch of land that ran from just above the Goulburn River junction southwards around Indigo Creek at Barnawartha. The strip included the junction of the King and Ovens rivers.

== Alternative names ==
- Quart-Quart
- Emu Mudjug tribe(?) (Note: This identification has been challenged on the grounds that the available evidence suggests the reported 'Emu Mudjug' tribe spoke a different language from the variety of Yorta Yorta believed to be spoken by the Kwakkwat, and they appear to have spoken a version of Wiradjuri.)
- Pikkolatpan

== Some words ==
- pikor (emu)

== Sources ==
- Bowe, Heather; Morey, Stephen (1999). The Yorta Yorta (Bangerang) language of the Murray Goulburn: including Yabula Yabula. Pacific Linguistics. ISBN 978-0-858-83513-9.
- Curr, Edward Micklethwaite (1887). Curr, Edward Micklethwaite (ed.). The Australian race: its origin, languages, customs, place of landing in Australia and the routes by which it spread itself over the continent (PDF). Vol. 3. Melbourne: J. Ferres.
- Smyth, Robert Brough (1878). The Aborigines of Victoria: with notes relating to the habits of the natives of other parts of Australia and Tasmania (PDF). Vol. 1. Melbourne: J. Ferres, gov't printer.
- Tindale, Norman Barnett (1974). "Kwatkwat (VIC)". Aboriginal Tribes of Australia: Their Terrain, Environmental Controls, Distribution, Limits, and Proper Names. Australian National University Press. ISBN 978-0-708-10741-6.
