= 2022 National Party of Australia leadership spill =

Election of David Littleproud

- 30 May 2022

21 caucus members of the National Party 11 caucus votes needed to win
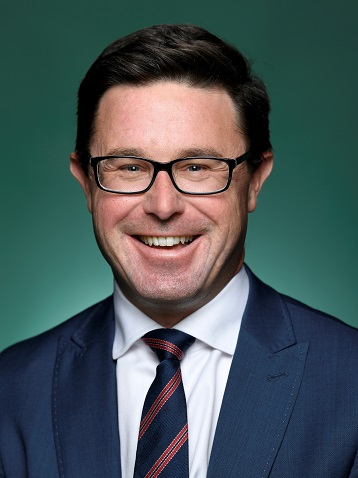

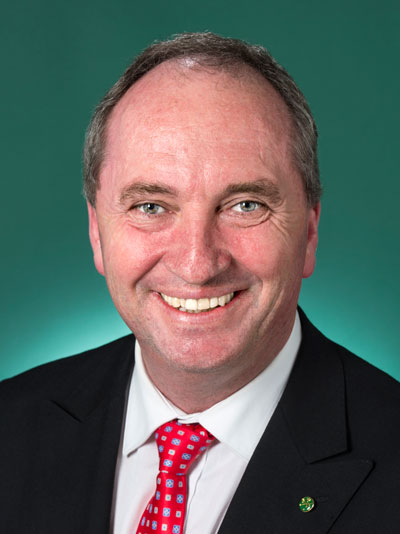

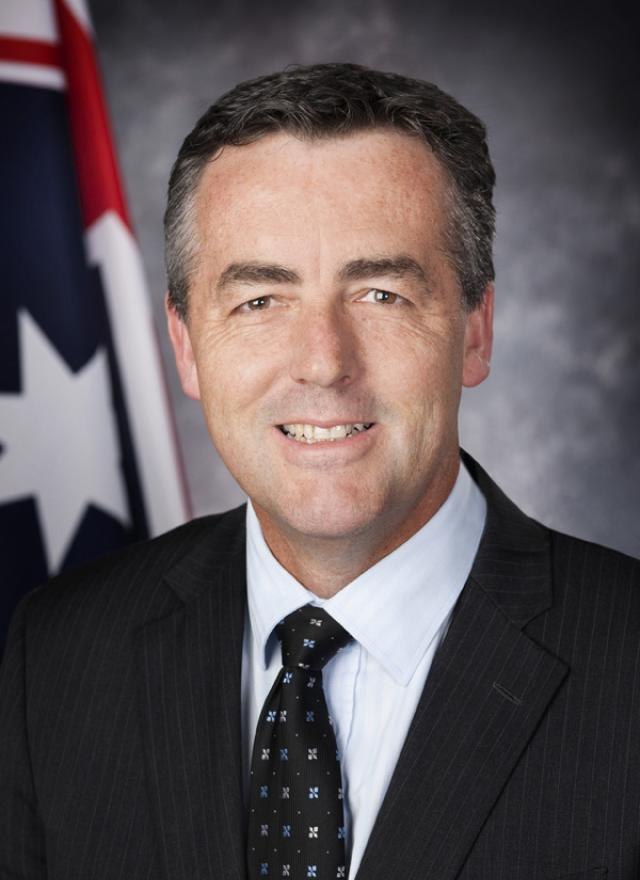
Candidate	David Littleproud	Barnaby Joyce	Darren Chester
Caucus vote	≥11 (Note: The National Party does not release the results of their internal elections.)	<11	<11
Leader before election
Barnaby Joyce
Elected Leader
David Littleproud

2022 National Party of Australia deputy leadership spill
- 30 May 2022
Candidate	Perin Davey
Caucus vote	Unopposed
Deputy Leader before election
David Littleproud
Elected Deputy Leader
Perin Davey

A leadership spill for the federal leadership of the National Party of Australia was held on 30 May 2022. The spill followed the federal election in which the Coalition, of which the Nationals form part, lost government, earlier in the same month. The incumbent leader, Barnaby Joyce, had served as Deputy Prime Minister in the outgoing government. He lost against his deputy David Littleproud, who was elected party leader.

On the same day, a separate leadership vote for the National Party's Coalition partner Liberal Party acclaimed Peter Dutton.

== Background ==
The Coalition lost the 2022 Australian federal election to the Labor opposition led by Anthony Albanese. There was significant media coverage surrounding the impact that comments made by Nationals politicians had on the loss of Liberal seats to independents, Labor and the Greens, particularly surrounding climate policy. The Nationals do not officially release the results of party leadership elections.

== Candidates ==
- Darren Chester, former Minister for Veterans' Affairs
- David Littleproud, incumbent Deputy Leader and former Minister for Agriculture and Northern Australia
- Barnaby Joyce, incumbent leader and former Deputy Prime Minister.

== Results ==
Littleproud won the spill and became the new party leader, with Perin Davey as his deputy. Even though Davey was a Senator, Bridget McKenzie was elected and remained leader of the Nationals in the Senate.

== See also ==
- 2022 Liberal Party of Australia leadership election
