= Wharparilla Flora Reserve =

Nature reserve in Australia

Coordinates: 36°07′21″S 144°43′19″E

The Wharparilla Flora Reserve is a small environmental reserve located 2 km west of Echuca, Victoria, Australia.

== History ==
Wharparilla Run was the original sheep station in Northern Victoria that encompassed a vast area of north central Victoria. In 1852, land from Wharparilla Run was gazetted by the Victorian government to establish the township of Echuca, which today is a thriving agriculture and tourism town on the Murray River, directly north of Melbourne.

Due to expanded agriculture, much of the Murray River's native habitat was destroyed, and the owner of Wharparilla in the 1960s played a pivotal role in preserving the Wharparilla Flora Reserve as a natural habitat.

== Heritage ==
The Yorta Yorta clan also have expressed their interest in maintaining the Reserve, since it was the location where they first met European settlers in the 1850s.

== Developmental impact ==
Current plans for a new bypass road around Echuca will cut through the Reserve.
