= 2022 Liberal Party of Australia leadership election =

Election of Peter Dutton

- Leadership election
- 30 May 2022
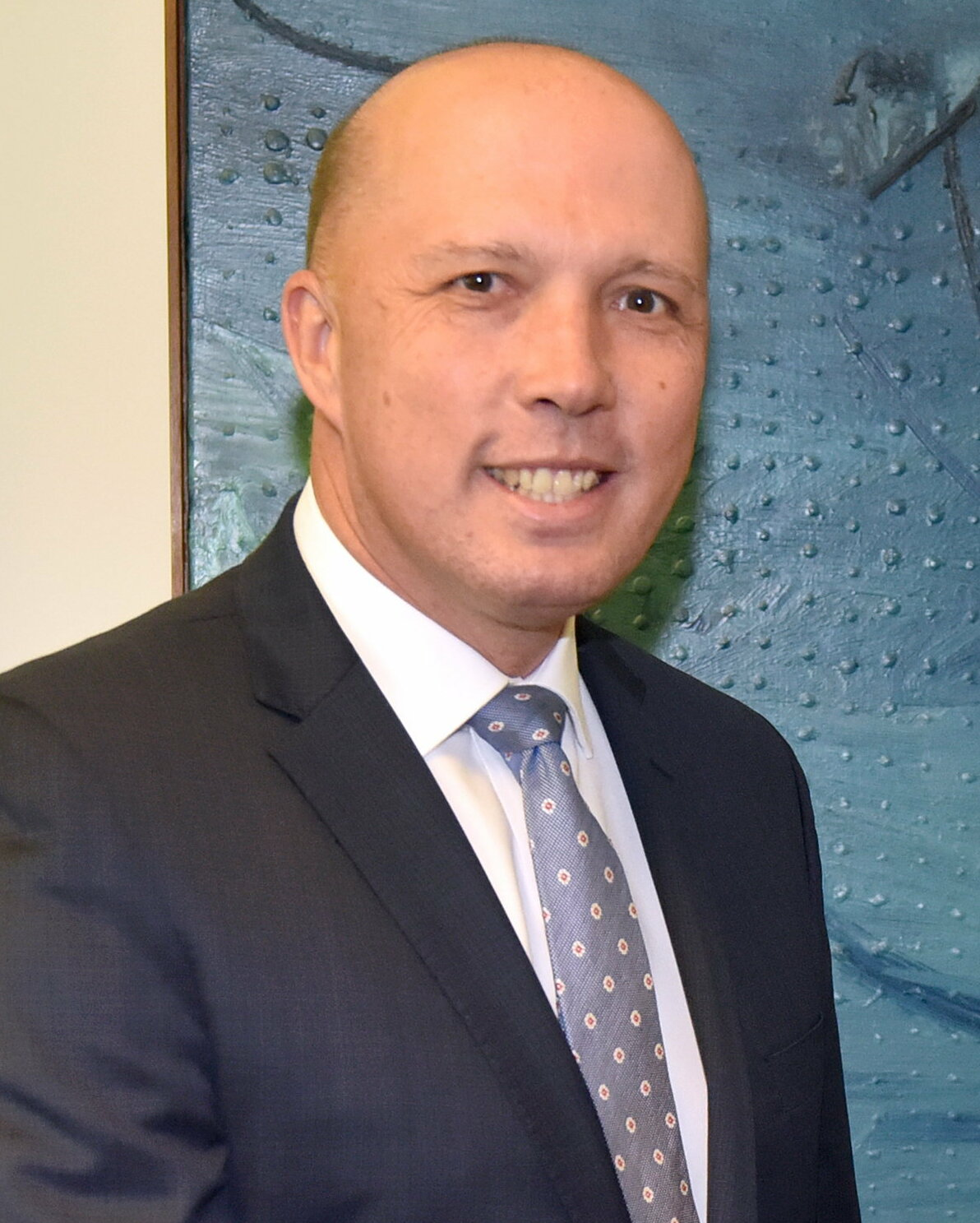
Candidate	Peter Dutton
Caucus vote	Unopposed
Seat	Dickson (Qld.)
Faction	National Right
Leader before election
Scott Morrison
Elected Leader
Peter Dutton
- Deputy leadership election
- 30 May 2022
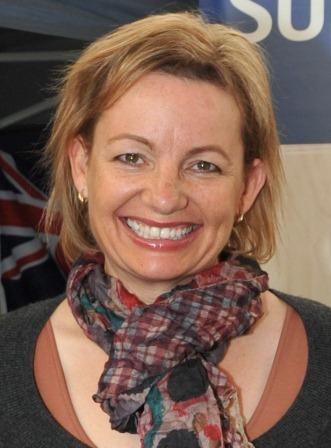
Candidate	Sussan Ley
Caucus vote	Unopposed
Seat	Farrer (NSW)
Faction	Moderate
Deputy Leader before election
Josh Frydenberg
Elected Deputy Leader
Sussan Ley

A leadership election of the Liberal Party of Australia was held on 30 May 2022, following the defeat of the Scott Morrison government at the 2022 federal election and the resignation of Morrison as party leader. The newly elected leader would become Leader of the Opposition to the Labor Party government of Anthony Albanese. A separate leadership spill for the Liberal Party's Coalition partner National Party was also held on the same day.

Peter Dutton was elected unopposed as leader, while Sussan Ley was elected unopposed as deputy leader. Dutton, who is from Queensland, is the first leader outside of New South Wales to lead the Liberal Party since Alexander Downer in 1995 from South Australia. Simon Birmingham was re-elected leader of the Liberal Party in the Senate.

Dutton is only the second Liberal leader after Downer outside of New South Wales and Victoria. Notwithstanding the party's inaugural leader and deputy leader Robert Menzies and Eric Harrison who had continued with their leadership positions from the previous United Australia Party, the election of Dutton as leader and Ley as his deputy marks the first time that both a new leader and new deputy leader were elected unopposed simultaneously.

== Background ==
After the governing Liberal–National coalition lost power at the 2022 federal election, Prime Minister Scott Morrison announced his resignation as Liberal leader on election night. He had led the party since 2018 and been prime minister since Malcolm Turnbull opted not to contest the second of two leadership spills in 2018.

Meanwhile, deputy leader and outgoing Treasurer Josh Frydenberg lost his seat of Kooyong in the election, leaving the position open for election. He was considered a likely successor to Morrison if he had been re-elected to Parliament.

== Candidates ==
Peter Dutton, Minister for Defence during the Morrison government, has been seen as the front runner to lead the Liberal Party following Morrison's resignation and Frydenberg's defeat.

Outgoing Minister for Industry, Energy and Emissions Reduction Angus Taylor, Minister for Home Affairs Karen Andrews, Minister for Trade, Tourism and Investment Dan Tehan, and Tasmanian MP Bridget Archer have also been posited as potential candidates for the leadership.

Speculated candidates for the deputy leadership included Minister for the Environment Sussan Ley and Minister for Families and Social Services Anne Ruston.

=== Leadership ===
==== Declared ====
Candidate	Electorate	Faction	Announced	Portfolio(s)
Peter Dutton	Dickson (Qld.)	National Right	26 May 2022	Minister for Defence (2021–2022)

==== Declined ====
- Karen Andrews, Minister for Home Affairs (2021–2022) (endorsed Dutton)
- Bridget Archer, member of the Parliament for Bass (2019–2025)
- Angus Taylor, Minister for Energy (2018–2022) (endorsed Dutton)
- Dan Tehan, Minister for Trade (2020–2022)

=== Deputy leadership ===
==== Declared ====
Candidate	Electorate	Faction	Announced	Portfolio(s)
Sussan Ley	Farrer (NSW)	Moderate	27 May 2022	Minister for the Environment (2019–2022)

==== Declined ====
- Karen Andrews, Minister for Home Affairs (2021–2022)
- Bridget Archer, member of the Parliament for Bass (2019–2025)
- Jane Hume, Minister for Superannuation, Financial Services and The Digital Economy, Minister for Women's Economic Security (2020–2022)
- Anne Ruston, Minister for Social Services (2019–2022)
- Dan Tehan, Minister for Trade (2020–2022)

== Reactions ==
Due to Dutton being a staunch conservative from the Right faction of the Liberal Party, Dutton's election as leader of the Liberal Party was received negatively by many.

=== Federal politicians ===
Labor minister Tanya Plibersek compared Dutton to Lord Voldemort. In a radio interview, she stated:

"I think there will be a lot of children who have watched a lot of Harry Potter films who will be very frightened of what they are seeing on TV at night. I am saying he looks a bit like Voldemort. We will see whether he can do what he promised he would do when he was last running for leader, which is smile more."

Plibersek later apologised. In a radio interview, Dutton called the claims "unfortunate" but "water off a duck's back", also noting that he wasn't "bald by choice" and was diagnosed with a skin condition several years ago. Plibersek's apology was welcomed by newly elected Prime Minister Anthony Albanese in an interview with ABC News.

Outgoing leader Scott Morrison and Moderate faction leader Simon Birmingham congratulated the party's new leadership team.

=== State politicians ===
Western Australian Premier Mark McGowan referred to Dutton as an "extremist" and criticised his election as Liberal leader. He stated:

"He's an extremist and I don't think he fits with modern Australia at all, and he doesn't seem to listen, he's extremely conservative. I actually don't think he's that smart, I've seen him present on things I don't really pick up, there's much there, as opposed to Scott Morrison, who is a clever guy. I don't pick up that Peter Dutton is fit to be Prime Minister."

== See also ==
- 2022 National Party of Australia leadership spill
