= Yorta Yorta language =

Pama–Nyungan language of southeastern Australia

Yorta Yorta
- Yotayota; Murray–Goulburn
- Region: Victoria, Australia
- Ethnicity: Yorta Yorta (Pangerang, Kwatkwat)
- Extinct: by 1960
- Revival: 151 self-identified speakers (2021 census)
- Language family: Pama–Nyungan: Yotayotic; Yorta Yorta
- Dialects: Yaliba-Yaliba

Language codes
- ISO 639-3: xyy
- Glottolog: yort1237
- AIATSIS: D2
- ELP: Yorta Yorta
- Location of Yorta Yorta Country in Victoria and New South Wales

Yorta Yorta (Yotayota) is a dialect cluster, or perhaps a group of closely related languages, spoken by the Yorta Yorta people, Indigenous Australians from the junction of the Goulburn and Murray Rivers in present-day northeast Victoria. Dixon considers it an isolate.

Yorta Yorta clans include the Bangerang, Kailtheban, Wollithiga, Moira, Penrith, Ulupna, Kwat Kwat and Nguaria-iiliam-wurrung. The name is also spelled Jotijota, Jodajoda, Joti-jota, Yodayod, Yoda-Yoda, Yoorta, Yota, Yoti Yoti, Yotta-Yotta, Youta; other names are Arramouro, Boonegatha, Echuca, Gunbowerooranditchgoole, Gunbowers, Kwart Kwart, Unungun, Wol-lithiga ~ Woollathura.

The Yaliba Yaliba language of the Pikkolaatpan tribe is about 70% similar to the dialect of the Bangerang, suggesting they may be closely related languages rather than dialects.

== Revival ==
Although the language is considered dormant due to contact with Europeans and forcible dislocation to missions, the Yorta Yorta have maintained many words. There have been strong moves of late to revive the language.

Two Yorta Yorta women, Lois Peeler and Sharon Atkinson, together with Dr Heather Bowe from Monash University, worked for several years to compile a comprehensive record of research material, entitled Yorta Yorta Language Heritage. This work provided a summary of existing written records, with reference to the spoken resources, and included introductory lessons in Yorta Yorta, together with English to Yorta Yorta and Yorta Yorta to English dictionaries.

== Phonology ==
=== Consonants ===
	Labial	Dental	Alveolar	Palatal	Retroflex	Velar
Stop	b	d̪	d	ɟ	(ɖ)	ɡ
Nasal	m	n̪	n	ɲ	(ɳ)	ŋ
Lateral			l	(ʎ)	(ɭ)	
Rhotic			ɾ~r		(ɽ)	
Approximant	w			j		

A palatal lateral or the following retroflex consonants could have potentially been recorded. An alveolar rhotic sound could have been a trill or a flap.

=== Vowels ===
	Front	Central	Back
Close	i		u
Mid	e		o
Open		a	

[e] is the rarest vowel. There are vowel-initial words Yorta-Yorta, due to the deletion of [j] or sometimes [ŋ] before [a], but not in Yabula-Yabula.

== Music ==
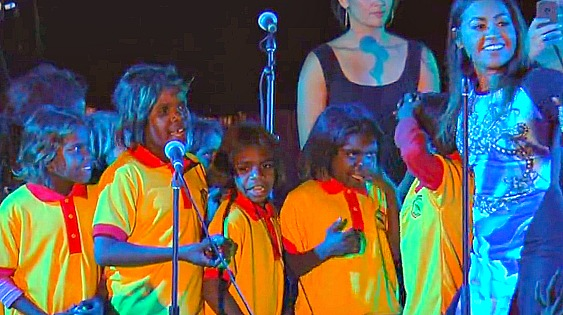
Indigenous pop, R&B, and soul singer Jessica Mauboy performs "Ngarra Burra Ferra" at the 2013 Mbantua Festival in Alice Springs, Northern Territory, with Aboriginal Australian students from Yipirinya State Primary School, of which Mauboy is the official ambassador.

The track "Ngarra Burra Ferra" sung by indigenous artist Jessica Mauboy from the 2012 hit film The Sapphires is a song based on the traditional Aboriginal hymn "Bura Fera". The song is in the Yorta Yorta language and speaks of the Lord God's help in decimating a Pharaoh's armies. The chorus, Ngara burra ferra yumini yala yala, translates into English as "The Lord God drowned all Pharaoh's armies, hallelujah!" These lyrics are based on an ancient song in Jewish tradition known as the "Song of the Sea" or "Miriam's Song", as it was composed and sung by Miriam, older sister of the prophet Moses. It can be found in Exodus 15, especially verse 4: "Pharaoh's chariots and his host hath he cast into the sea: his chosen captains also are drowned in the Red Sea." Aboriginal communities of Victoria and southern New South Wales may be the only people in the world who still sing the piece (in Yorta Yorta).
