= Yabula-Yabula language =

Extinct Australian Aboriginal language

Yabula-Yabula
- Jabulajabula, Ngarimoro
- Native to: Australia
- Region: Victoria, New South Wales
- Ethnicity: Ngarrimouro/Ngarrimowro
- Extinct: (date missing)
- Language family: Pama–Nyungan: Yotayotic; Yabula-Yabula

Language codes
- ISO 639-3: yxy
- Glottolog: yabu1234
- AIATSIS: S38
- ELP: Yabula-Yabula

Yabula-Yabula (Jabulajabula) in an extinct language of Australia, located in Victoria and New South Wales. Dixon listed it an isolate, but Glottolog evaluates it as a dialect of Yotayota. It shares only 44% of its vocabulary with Yorta Yorta, so is best considered a separate language. This may be due to the rapid lexical change involved after a person's death, as their name then cannot be uttered.

== Phonology ==
=== Consonants ===
The consonants of Yabula-Yabula are likely the same as those in Yorta-Yorta, based on analysis of wordlists.

	Labial	Dental	Alveolar	Palatal	Retroflex	Velar
Stop	b	d̪	d	ɟ	(ɖ )	ɡ
Nasal	m	n̪	n	ɲ	(ɳ )	ŋ
Lateral			l	(ʎ)	(ɭ )	
Rhotic			ɾ~r		(ɽ)	
Approximant	w			j		

=== Vowels ===
Vowels in Yabula-Yabula were likely also identical to those in Yorta-Yorta.

	Front	Central	Back
Close	i		u
Mid	e		o
Open		a	

[e] is the rarest vowel. There are no vowel-initial words in Yabula-Yabula, but there are some in Yorta-Yorta, due to the deletion of [j] or sometimes [ŋ] before [a].
