= David Wirrpanda =

Australian rules footballer, born 1979

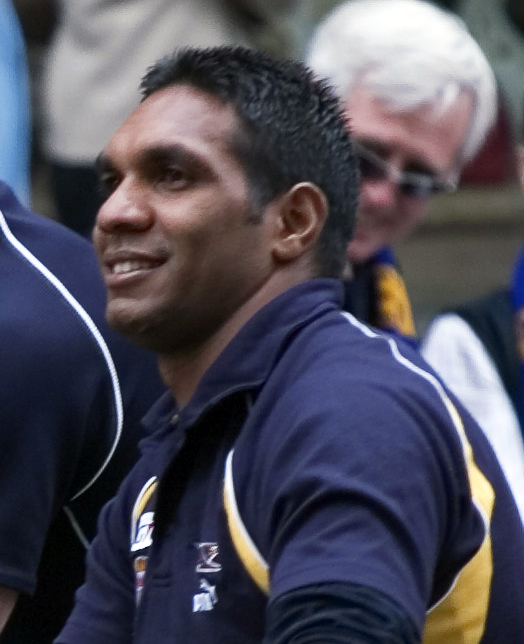
- Wirrpanda with West Coast in 2005

Personal information
- Full name: David Selwyn Burralung; Merringwuy Galarrwuy; Wyal Wirrpanda
- Nickname: "Wirra"
- Born: 3 August 1979 (age 47); Carlton, Victoria, Australia
- Original team: Healesville (YVMDFL)
- Height: 173 cm (5 ft 8 in)
- Weight: 82 kg (181 lb)
- Positions: Defender, forward

Playing career
Years	Club	Games (Goals)
1996–2009	West Coast	227 (131)

International team honours
Years	Team	Games (Goals)
2003	Australia	2 (0)

Career highlights
- All-Australian team 2005; West Coast Eagles premiership side 2006

David Selwyn Burralung Merringwuy Galarrwuy Wyal Wirrpanda (/wɪrəˈpʌndə/ wirr-ə-PUN-də; born 3 August 1979) is a former Australian rules footballer, best known for his career with the West Coast Eagles in the Australian Football League (AFL). Selected by West Coast during the 1995 draft period, Wirrpanda made his debut for the club during the following season. Having played his first game for West Coast at the age of 16 years and 268 days, he remains the youngest player to have played a senior game for the club.

Limited by injuries in his first few seasons, Wirrpanda did not establish himself as a regular player until the early 2000s, usually playing out of a back pocket or across a half-back flank. Outstanding form in these positions led to his selection in the 2005 All-Australian team, and the following season he was a member of the West Coast premiership side that defeated Sydney in the 2006 grand final. Often playing as a small forward towards the end of his career, Wirrpanda retired at the end of the 2009 season, finishing with 227 games for the club. Since the conclusion of his playing career, he has involved himself in charity work, including the establishment of the Wirrpanda Foundation, an organisation supporting Indigenous Australians. Wirrpanda has also expressed a desire to enter politics, and unsuccessfully contested 2013 federal election as the National Party's candidate for the Senate in Western Australia.

== Early life and education ==
David Selwyn Burralung Merringwuy Galarrwuy Wyal Wirrpanda was born on 3 August 1979 in the Melbourne suburb of Carlton. An Aboriginal Australian, he is of Yorta Yorta heritage on his mother Margaret Wirrpanda's side, and his father was a Yolngu Djapu man from Arnhem Land, Northern Territory. Wirrpanda is a grandnephew of Sir Douglas Nicholls. He was raised in Shepparton, Victoria.

He attended Parkmore Primary School in Forest Hill, where in a school football match he kicked 32 goals in one game. He went on to attend Worawa Aboriginal College in Healesville, which had been established by his mother's family.

He began his football career with Healesville under-9s, and subsequently progressed to the Eastern Ranges team in the under-18 TAC Cup.

== Football career ==
Wirrpanda starred for Eastern Ranges in the TAC Cup during 1995, and was scouted by West Coast Eagles recruiters and brought to Perth by longtime Eagles CEO Trevor Nisbett.

Wirrpanda made his debut with West Coast in Round 5 of the 1996 AFL Season, at the age of 16 years, 268 days, and remains the Eagles' youngest ever debutant. Unfortunately, injuries and fluctuating form hurt him early in his career, and he managed only 12 of a possible 71 AFL games (including finals) in his first 3 seasons. During these early years, he also played 25 games for East Perth in the WAFL.

By the mid-2000s, Wirrpanda's career started to get on track, and he became a consistent contributor for the Eagles, playing mainly as a small defender in the back pocket or half back flank. After a solid year in 2004, he had a stellar 2005 season in which he won selection in the All-Australian team, his trademark clearances from defence being a vital part of the Eagles' success that year. He continued to do well in 2006, marking his 150th AFL game with a great performance.

Wirrpanda nearly missed out on the 2006 AFL Grand Final through injury, but came back to take his place in the side. He came in at the expense of Jaymie Graham, who had played every game of that season up until then, and out of respect for his younger teammate, Wirrpanda played in the match with Graham's #22 written on his hand.

In 2007 and 2008, Wirrpanda has shared time between his usual backline post and pinch-hitting up forward for his team, using his excellent foot skills to both set up play and score some crucial goals for the Eagles in the process.

In 2008, Wirrpanda was met solidly by Geelong's Gary Ablett in a match at Skilled Stadium. The incident sparked some debate among the football media and fans alike, as although photographs revealed head high contact was made during the bump, Wirrpanda had also slid to the ground, assuring that Ablett had upheld his duty of care as best he could when bumping an opposition player, and therefore not resulting in a suspension for the incident.

At the conclusion of Round 22, 2009, he had played in 227 of a possible 327 matches for the Eagles (including finals), and has scored 131 goals, averaging 16.6 disposals for his career.

In September 2009, Wirrpanda announced his retirement citing he may be standing in the way of another younger playing being fast tracked within the club. After the birth of his son, Wirrpanda also expressed his desire to move on citing his fatherhood is the most important aspect of his life, but also spending more time with the foundation that bears his name.

Wirrpanda has also announced his wishes to remain part of the West Coast Eagles, saying that he may one day serve on the board.

== Statistics ==
Legend
G	Goals	K	Kicks	D	Disposals	T	Tackles
B	Behinds	H	Handballs	M	Marks

Season	Team	No.	Games	Totals							Averages (per game)						
Season	Team	No.	Games	G	B	K	H	D	M	T	G	B	K	H	D	M	T
1996	West Coast	44	5	4	5	23	18	41	8	9	0.8	1.0	4.6	3.6	8.2	1.6	1.8
1997	West Coast	44	6	2	2	30	21	51	11	8	0.3	0.3	5.0	3.5	8.5	1.8	1.3
1998	West Coast	44	1	1	0	4	1	5	0	0	1.0	0.0	4.0	1.0	5.0	0.0	0.0
1999	West Coast	44	24	4	4	278	126	404	91	27	0.2	0.2	11.6	5.3	16.8	3.8	1.1
2000	West Coast	44	8	6	5	129	28	157	33	8	0.8	0.6	16.1	3.5	19.6	4.1	1.0
2001	West Coast	44	21	5	7	245	57	302	66	30	0.2	0.3	11.7	2.7	14.4	3.1	1.4
2002	West Coast	44	21	26	22	254	72	326	70	49	1.2	1.0	12.1	3.4	15.5	3.3	2.3
2003	West Coast	44	19	10	10	251	57	308	62	26	0.5	0.5	13.2	3.0	16.2	3.3	1.4
2004	West Coast	44	22	2	3	259	104	363	56	59	0.1	0.1	11.8	4.7	16.5	2.5	2.7
2005	West Coast	44	20	2	2	297	111	408	93	34	0.1	0.1	14.9	5.6	20.4	4.7	1.7
2006	West Coast	44	24	8	7	297	115	412	90	48	0.3	0.3	12.4	4.8	17.2	3.8	2.0
2007	West Coast	44	21	25	12	268	94	362	109	43	1.2	0.6	12.8	4.5	17.2	5.2	2.0
2008	West Coast	44	17	25	16	212	63	275	88	30	1.5	0.9	12.5	3.7	16.2	5.2	1.8
2009	West Coast	44	18	11	3	257	94	351	85	37	0.6	0.2	14.3	5.2	19.5	4.7	2.1
Career			227	131	98	2804	961	3765	862	408	0.6	0.4	12.4	4.2	16.6	3.8	1.8

== Other activities ==
For most of his career, Wirrpanda was known as "Wirrpunda", but in 2005 it was pointed out that his actual birth name was Wirrpanda. In The West Australian before the 2006 season Wirrpanda said that he had allowed his name to be misspelt to ensure it was pronounced correctly.

Wirrpanda is known for his community work in helping to improve the lives of young Indigenous Australians, first and foremost through the David Wirrpanda Foundation, which he launched in 2005.

He hosted a Saturday morning radio show called "Dead Set Legends" in Perth on Mix 94.5.

In 2010, Wirrpanda participated in the tenth season of Dancing with the Stars, partnering with Liza van Pelt. However, in the competition's eighth round, he unexpectedly withdrew to concentrate on his foundation, becoming the first contestant to quit in the show's history.

== Recognition ==
Wirrpanda was named the 9th most influential Aboriginal Australian by The Bulletin magazine in 2007 and 2008.

He received the 2009 award for Young Western Australian of the Year.

== Personal life ==
Wirrpanda and his partner Shannon McGuire had their first child in August 2009.

He is the uncle and godfather of Matildas goalkeeper Jada Mathyssen-Whyman.

In 2015 Wirrpanda was convicted of driving under the influence of alcohol. He was fined A$900 and lost his driver's licence for 10 months.
