= Margaret Wirrpanda =

Aboriginal Australian activist in Victoria (1939-2013)

- Born: Margaret Briggs; 1939; Cummeragunja
- Died: 24 February 2013 (aged 73–74); Melbourne
- Children: David Wirrpanda
- Relatives: Margaret Tucker (aunt)

Margaret Wirrpanda (1939 – 24 February 2013) was a campaigner for Australian Aboriginal rights.

== Early life and education ==
Margaret Briggs was born in 1939 at Cummeragunja, New South Wales, the daughter of activists Geraldine Clements Briggs and Selwyn Briggs. Her maternal aunt, Margaret Tucker, and maternal grandmother Teresa Middleton Clements were also active on behalf of Yorta Yorta rights.

She had no formal high school education and instead gained much of her knowledge from seeking out the insight of government and private figures. Their extended family of activists included Sir Douglas Nicholls and Jack Patten. Margaret was one of nine siblings raised in Shepparton.

== Career ==
In the 1960s Wirrpanda joined her mother and sisters in working towards Aboriginal rights with the Federal Council for the Advancement of Aborigines and Torres Strait Islanders (FCAATSI). They were part of the movement that won approval of the 1967 Referendum. Wirrpanda became an officer of the National Council of Aboriginal and Islander Women when it formed in 1972, and was a co-founder of the Victorian Aboriginal Health Service that same year, along with Alma Thorpe, Bruce McGuinness, and others. In 1973 she helped to found the Victorian Aboriginal Legal Service.

Wirrpanda was the first woman to be president of the Aborigines Advancement League. In the 1980s, she served a term as president of the National Women's Consultative Council. She spent her later years as a plaintiff representing the Yorta Yorta Tribal Council, in court cases related to native title claims; and as convener of the Victorian Aboriginal Women's Congress. She also served as principal of Worawa Aboriginal College, a school for Aboriginal youth founded by her sister, Hyllus Maris, in 1983.

In 1984, Wirrpanda played an important role in assisting the Yorta Yorta Tribal Council attempt to claim ownership over the Barmah Forest. She continued to support the tribe in legal proceedings with the Federal Court between 1996 and 2002, and was inducted into the Victorian Honour Roll of Women in 2003.

Wirrpanda was part of a committee devoted to water issues after the Victorian Government signed a land management agreement with the Yorta Yorta tribe in 2004. She is quoted as saying, "We concentrate too much on what happens overseas and not enough on what's going on here. When the water level gets low enough, we're all going to find out what it means to survive."

== Personal life ==
Margaret Briggs married David Wirrpanda. They had four children, including David Wirrpanda, a noted footballer.

Wirrpanda died in early 2013 in Melbourne, from complications related to diabetes.

In 2014 she was posthumously named to the Victoria Indigenous Honour Roll.
