= Yotayotic languages =

Pair of Pama–Nyungan languages of southeastern Australia

Yotayotic
- Geographic distribution: Australia
- Linguistic classification: Pama–Nyungan: Southeastern; Victorian; Eastern Victoria; Yotayotic
- Subdivisions: Yotayota; Yabula-Yabula

Language codes
- Glottolog: None yort1237 (covered by Yotayota)
- Yotayotic languages (green) among other Pama–Nyungan (tan)

The Yotayotic languages are a pair of languages of the Pama–Nyungan family, Yotayota and Yabula-Yabula. Dixon (2002) classified them as two separate families, but per Bowe & Morey (1999) Glottolog considers them to be dialects of a single language.
