= Electoral results for the Division of Goldstein =

Australian division election results

This is a list of electoral results for the Division of Goldstein in Australian federal elections from the division's creation in 1984 until the present.

== Members ==
Member	Party	Term
Ian Macphee	Liberal	1984–1990
David Kemp	Liberal	1990–2004
Andrew Robb	Liberal	2004–2016
Tim Wilson	Liberal	2016–2022
Zoe Daniel	Independent	2022–2025
Tim Wilson	Liberal	2025–present

== Election results ==
=== Elections in the 2020s ===
==== 2025 ====
2025 Australian federal election: Goldstein
Party	Candidate	Votes	%	±%
Liberal	Tim Wilson	50,228	43.42	+3.85
Independent	Zoe Daniel	35,533	30.72	−0.57
Labor	Nildhara Gadani	15,812	13.67	+0.07
Greens	Alana Galli-McRostie	8,320	7.19	−1.23
Trumpet of Patriots	Vicki Williams	2,066	1.79	+1.79
One Nation	Leon Gardiner	2,037	1.76	+0.31
Libertarian	David Segal	1,677	1.45	−0.96
Total formal votes		115,673	97.31	+0.74
Informal votes		3,198	2.69	−0.74
Turnout		118,871	94.24	+2.87
Two-party-preferred result
Liberal	Tim Wilson	62,427	53.97	+0.25
Labor	Nildhara Gadani	53,246	46.03	−0.25
Two-candidate-preferred result
Liberal	Tim Wilson	57,924	50.08	+1.88
Independent	Zoe Daniel	57,749	49.92	−1.88
Liberal gain from Independent		Swing	+1.88	

==== 2022 ====
2022 Australian federal election: Goldstein
Party	Candidate	Votes	%	±%
Liberal	Tim Wilson	39,607	40.38	−12.29
Independent	Zoe Daniel	33,815	34.47	+34.47
Labor	Martyn Abbott	10,799	11.01	−17.30
Greens	Alana Galli-McRostie	7,683	7.83	−6.21
Liberal Democrats	David Segal	2,072	2.11	+2.11
United Australia	Catherine Reynolds	1,840	1.88	−0.08
One Nation	Lisa Stark	1,239	1.26	+1.26
Justice	Ellie Sullivan	589	0.60	+0.60
Sustainable Australia	Brandon Hoult	443	0.45	−1.21
Total formal votes		98,087	96.57	−1.22
Informal votes		3,487	3.43	+1.22
Turnout		101,574	92.65	−1.07
Notional two-party-preferred count
Liberal	Tim Wilson	53,750	54.80	−2.99
Labor	Martyn Abbott	44,337	45.20	+2.99
Two-candidate-preferred result
Independent	Zoe Daniel	51,861	52.87	+52.87
Liberal	Tim Wilson	46,226	47.13	−10.66
Independent gain from Liberal				

Alluvial diagram for preference flows in the seat of Goldstein in the 2022 federal election. indicates at what stage the winning candidate had over 50% of the votes and was declared the winner.

=== Elections in the 2010s ===
==== 2019 ====
2019 Australian federal election: Goldstein
Party	Candidate	Votes	%	±%
Liberal	Tim Wilson	52,320	52.67	−3.66
Labor	Daniel Pollock	28,118	28.31	+6.43
Greens	Sue Pennicuik	13,951	14.04	−1.86
United Australia	Wayne Connolly	1,945	1.96	+1.96
Sustainable Australia	Brandon Hoult	1,653	1.66	+1.66
Independent	John Tiger Casley	1,349	1.36	+1.36
Total formal votes		99,336	97.79	+0.25
Informal votes		2,244	2.21	−0.25
Turnout		101,580	93.61	+2.19
Two-party-preferred result
Liberal	Tim Wilson	57,408	57.79	−4.89
Labor	Daniel Pollock	41,928	42.21	+4.89
Liberal hold		Swing	−4.89	

==== 2016 ====
2016 Australian federal election: Goldstein
Party	Candidate	Votes	%	±%
Liberal	Tim Wilson	52,694	56.33	−0.18
Labor	Matthew Coote	20,466	21.88	−1.95
Greens	Cheryl Hercus	14,871	15.90	0.00
Animal Justice	Naren Chellappah	2,222	2.38	+2.38
Drug Law Reform	Lee Kavanagh	1,738	1.86	+1.86
Family First	Trevor Bishop	1,549	1.66	+0.83
Total formal votes		93,540	97.54	+0.87
Informal votes		2,363	2.46	−0.87
Turnout		95,903	91.43	−1.74
Two-party-preferred result
Liberal	Tim Wilson	58,628	62.68	+1.65
Labor	Matthew Coote	34,912	37.32	−1.65
Liberal hold		Swing	+1.65	

==== 2013 ====
2013 Australian federal election: Goldstein
Party	Candidate	Votes	%	±%
Liberal	Andrew Robb	51,193	56.51	+4.42
Labor	Daniel Guttmann	21,591	23.83	−6.36
Greens	Rose Read	14,408	15.90	−0.30
Palmer United	Keith Ryder	2,044	2.26	+2.26
Family First	Ian Joyner	751	0.83	−0.50
Rise Up Australia	Lynette Hannie	604	0.67	+0.67
Total formal votes		90,591	96.67	−0.19
Informal votes		3,121	3.33	+0.19
Turnout		93,712	93.20	+0.07
Two-party-preferred result
Liberal	Andrew Robb	55,288	61.03	+5.02
Labor	Daniel Guttmann	35,303	38.97	−5.02
Liberal hold		Swing	+5.02	

==== 2010 ====
2010 Australian federal election: Goldstein
Party	Candidate	Votes	%	±%
Liberal	Andrew Robb	44,436	52.55	−0.37
Labor	Nick Eden	25,227	29.83	−3.86
Greens	Neil Pilling	13,708	16.21	+5.84
Family First	Anthony Forster	1,187	1.40	+0.26
Total formal votes		84,558	96.87	−0.71
Informal votes		2,735	3.13	+0.71
Turnout		87,293	92.92	−2.04
Two-party-preferred result
Liberal	Andrew Robb	47,747	56.47	+0.42
Labor	Nick Eden	36,811	43.53	−0.42
Liberal hold		Swing	+0.42	

=== Elections in the 2000s ===
==== 2007 ====
2007 Australian federal election: Goldstein
Party	Candidate	Votes	%	±%
Liberal	Andrew Robb	45,141	52.92	−3.06
Labor	Julia Mason	28,734	33.69	+3.23
Greens	Neil Pilling	8,846	10.37	+1.51
Democrats	Michael Bailey	1,422	1.67	+0.44
Family First	Joyce Khoo	970	1.14	−0.19
Citizens Electoral Council	Colin Horne	186	0.22	+0.01
Total formal votes		85,299	97.58	+0.98
Informal votes		2,112	2.42	−0.98
Turnout		87,411	95.00	+0.40
Two-party-preferred result
Liberal	Andrew Robb	47,811	56.05	−3.98
Labor	Julia Mason	37,488	43.95	+3.98
Liberal hold		Swing	−3.98	

==== 2004 ====
2004 Australian federal election: Goldstein
Party	Candidate	Votes	%	±%
Liberal	Andrew Robb	45,829	55.98	+3.25
Labor	Craig Tucker	24,941	30.46	+2.95
Greens	Bill Clair	7,251	8.86	+2.45
Independent	Terry O'Brien	1,585	1.94	+1.94
Family First	Mark Hermans	1,088	1.33	+1.33
Democrats	Aron Paul Igai	1,006	1.23	−6.30
Citizens Electoral Council	Heather E Shomali	168	0.21	+0.21
Total formal votes		81,858	96.60	−0.63
Informal votes		2,880	3.40	+0.63
Turnout		84,748	94.60	+0.16
Two-party-preferred result
Liberal	Andrew Robb	49,147	60.03	+0.53
Labor	Craig Tucker	32,721	39.97	−0.53
Liberal hold		Swing	+0.53	

==== 2001 ====
2001 Australian federal election: Goldstein
Party	Candidate	Votes	%	±%
Liberal	David Kemp	43,535	52.72	+0.68
Labor	Rachel Powning	22,730	27.52	−6.00
Democrats	Michaela Newell	6,215	7.53	−0.12
Greens	Teresa Puszka	5,294	6.41	+3.52
Independent	Kristin Stegley	4,807	5.82	+5.82
Total formal votes		82,581	97.23	−0.06
Informal votes		2,350	2.77	+0.06
Turnout		84,931	94.60	
Two-party-preferred result
Liberal	David Kemp	49,122	59.48	+1.33
Labor	Rachel Powning	33,459	40.52	−1.33
Liberal hold		Swing	+1.33	

=== Elections in the 1990s ===
==== 1998 ====
1998 Australian federal election: Goldstein
Party	Candidate	Votes	%	±%
Liberal	David Kemp	41,881	52.04	−3.23
Labor	Margaret Khouri	26,980	33.53	+1.44
Democrats	Diane Barry	6,156	7.65	−0.68
Greens	Nick Brunton	2,328	2.89	−0.90
One Nation	Peter Crawford	1,822	2.26	+2.26
Unity	Arkady Shtrambrandt	672	0.84	+0.84
Abolish Child Support	Meret Field	413	0.51	+0.51
Natural Law	Joan Dickins	225	0.28	−0.25
Total formal votes		80,477	97.29	−0.43
Informal votes		2,242	2.71	+0.43
Turnout		82,719	94.94	−0.72
Two-party-preferred result
Liberal	David Kemp	46,801	58.15	−2.79
Labor	Margaret Khouri	33,676	41.85	+2.79
Liberal hold		Swing	−2.79	

==== 1996 ====
1996 Australian federal election: Goldstein
Party	Candidate	Votes	%	±%
Liberal	David Kemp	44,139	55.27	−0.83
Labor	Kip Calvert	25,623	32.08	−3.96
Democrats	Diane Barry	6,650	8.33	+3.65
Greens	Justin Kennedy	3,029	3.79	+3.79
Natural Law	Robert Johnson	425	0.53	−1.56
Total formal votes		79,864	97.72	+0.20
Informal votes		1,866	2.28	−0.20
Turnout		81,730	95.67	+0.09
Two-party-preferred result
Liberal	David Kemp	48,296	60.94	+1.95
Labor	Kip Calvert	30,956	39.06	−1.95
Liberal hold		Swing	+1.95	

==== 1993 ====
1993 Australian federal election: Goldstein
Party	Candidate	Votes	%	±%
Liberal	David Kemp	38,474	52.79	+5.54
Labor	Martin Pakula	28,436	39.02	+9.17
Democrats	Geoff Herbert	3,479	4.77	−8.38
Natural Law	Brian Gale	1,503	2.06	+2.06
	James Ritchie	983	1.35	+1.35
Total formal votes		72,875	97.38	+1.09
Informal votes		1,957	2.62	−1.09
Turnout		74,832	95.57	
Two-party-preferred result
Liberal	David Kemp	40,449	55.54	−0.42
Labor	Martin Pakula	32,376	44.46	+0.42
Liberal hold		Swing	−0.42	

==== 1990 ====
1990 Australian federal election: Goldstein
Party	Candidate	Votes	%	±%
Liberal	David Kemp	33,468	47.3	−3.5
Labor	Michael Danby	21,138	29.8	−10.2
Democrats	Di Bretherton	9,318	13.2	+7.4
Independent	Diana Wolowski	4,751	6.7	+6.7
Democratic Socialist	Adrienne Barrett	1,006	1.4	+1.4
Call to Australia	Phillip McGibbony	758	1.1	+1.1
Independent	John Casley	222	0.3	+0.3
Independent	Peter Kormoczy	160	0.2	+0.2
Total formal votes		70,821	96.3	
Informal votes		2,728	3.7	
Turnout		73,549	95.4	
Two-party-preferred result
Liberal	David Kemp	39,575	56.0	−1.1
Labor	Michael Danby	31,145	44.0	+1.1
Liberal hold		Swing	−1.1	

=== Elections in the 1980s ===
==== 1987 ====
1987 Australian federal election: Goldstein
Party	Candidate	Votes	%	±%
Liberal	Ian Macphee	35,029	55.4	+3.3
Labor	Murray McInnes	22,343	35.4	−3.0
Democrats	Maureen Boaler	3,654	5.8	+0.7
Democratic Labor	Michael Rowe	1,436	2.3	−0.5
Independent	Tiger Casley	739	1.2	+1.2
Total formal votes		63,201	95.0	
Informal votes		3,295	5.0	
Turnout		66,496	93.5	
Two-party-preferred result
Liberal	Ian Macphee	37,566	59.5	+3.3
Labor	Murray McInnes	25,618	40.5	−3.3
Liberal hold		Swing	+3.3	

==== 1984 ====
1984 Australian federal election: Goldstein
Party	Candidate	Votes	%	±%
Liberal	Ian Macphee	32,788	52.1	+2.0
Labor	Garry Moore	24,147	38.4	−2.6
Democrats	Maureen Boaler	3,232	5.1	−2.8
Democratic Labor	Patrick Keelan	1,763	2.8	+2.8
National	Pat Brown	1,014	1.6	+1.6
Total formal votes		62,944	92.0	
Informal votes		5,492	8.0	
Turnout		68,436	94.0	
Two-party-preferred result
Liberal	Ian Macphee	35,357	56.2	+2.8
Labor	Garry Moore	27,548	43.8	−2.8
Liberal notional hold		Swing	+2.8	
