= China–Australia Free Trade Agreement =

Bilateral Free Trade Agreement (FTA) between the governments of Australia and China

Monthly value of Australian merchandise exports to China (A$ millions) since 1988

Monthly value of Chinese merchandise exports to Australia (A$ millions) since 1988

The China–Australia Free Trade Agreement (ChAFTA) is a bilateral free trade agreement (FTA) between the governments of Australia and China. Since negotiations began, 21 negotiating rounds have been completed. The deal was completed on 17 November 2014 and details released two days later, nearly 10 years after its first round of negotiations that began on 23 May 2005 after a joint feasibility study. The free trade agreement was signed between the two countries on 17 June 2015. Following the usual treaty making process the agreement came into force on 20 December 2015, after the Chinese Government completed its domestic legal and legislative processes and the Australian Parliament's Joint Standing Committee on Treaties and the Senate Foreign Affairs, Defence and Trade References Committee finished a review.

== Background ==
According to the Australian Department of Foreign Affairs and Trade, in 2014, China was Australia's largest export market for both goods and services, accounting for nearly a third of total exports, and a growing source of foreign investment.

Australia's Prime Minister Tony Abbott and China's paramount leader Xi Jinping announced the conclusion of negotiations for the China–Australia Free Trade Agreement (ChAFTA) on 17 November 2014. A Declaration of Intent to work towards signature of the Agreement was signed by Australia's Trade and Investment Minister Andrew Robb and China's Commerce Minister Gao Hucheng.

== Provisions ==
Upon full implementation of the agreement, 95 percent of Australian exports to China will be tariff free. These will include many agricultural products, including beef and dairy. In addition, there will be liberalization of market access for Australia's services sector, and investments by private companies from China under 1,078 million AUD will not be subject to FIRB approval. In addition there will be an Investor State Dispute Settlement mechanism under the treaty.

There will be a Work and Holiday Agreement in which Australia will grant up to 5,000 visas to Chinese nationals for work and holiday makers. The free trade agreement was signed in Canberra, Australia between the two countries on 17 June 2015. The agreement will follow the usual treaty making process whereby it will come into force when China will complete its domestic legal and legislative processes and in Australia, review by the Australian Parliament's Joint Standing Committee on Treaties, and the Senate Foreign Affairs, Defence and Trade References Committee.

== See also ==
- New Zealand–China Free Trade Agreement
- Japan–Australia Economic Partnership Agreement
- Australia–Korea Free Trade Agreement
- Abbott government
