= Andrew Robb =

Australian politician

The Honourable Andrew Robb AO
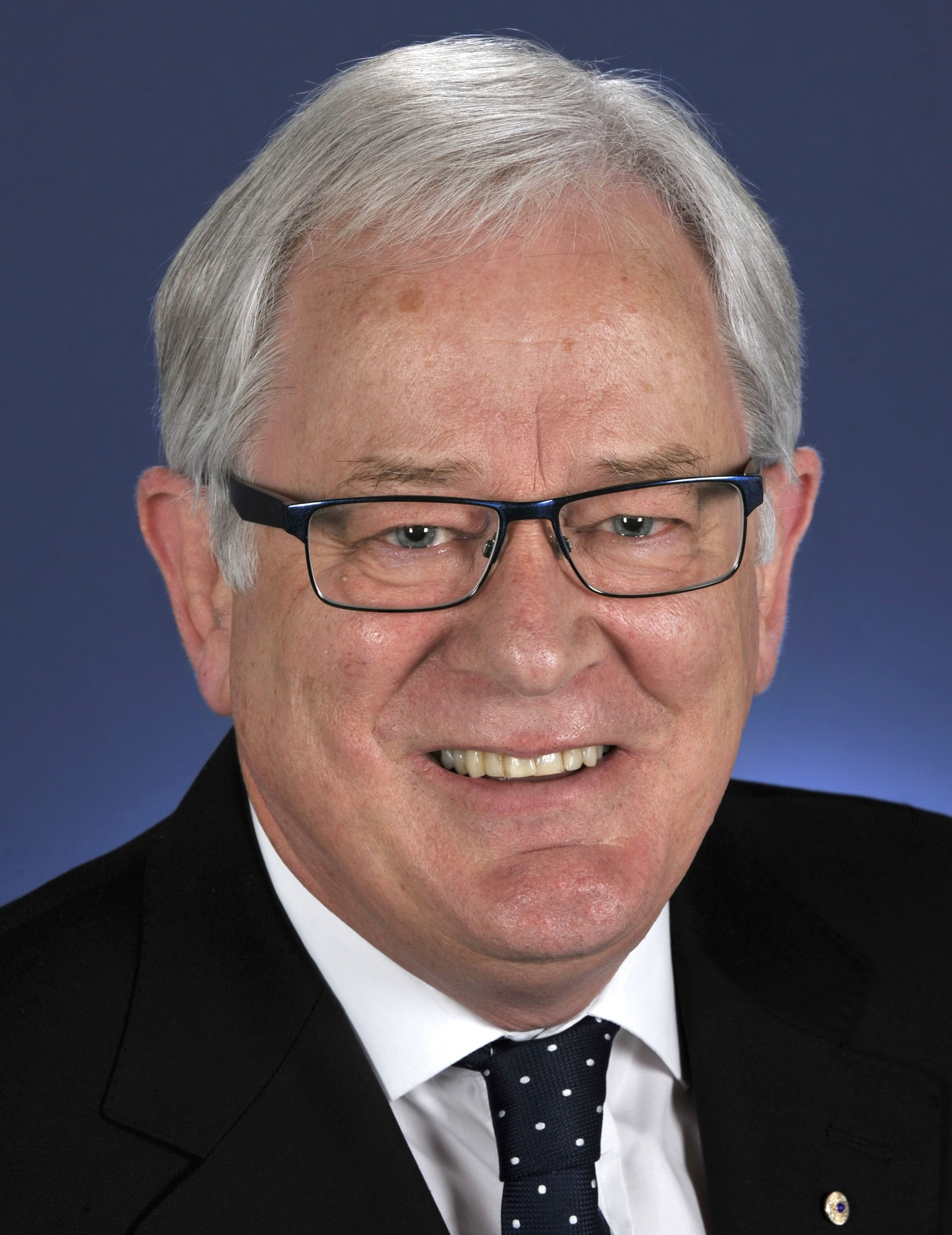
- Official portrait, 2014

Minister for Trade and Investment
- In office 18 September 2013 – 18 February 2016
- Prime Minister: Tony Abbott; Malcolm Turnbull
- Preceded by: Richard Marles
- Succeeded by: Steven Ciobo

Minister for Vocational and Further Education
- In office 23 January 2007 – 3 December 2007
- Prime Minister: John Howard
- Preceded by: Gary Hardgrave
- Succeeded by: Office abolished

Member of the Australian Parliament for Goldstein
- In office 9 October 2004 – 9 May 2016
- Preceded by: David Kemp
- Succeeded by: Tim Wilson

Personal details
- Born: Andrew John Robb; 20 August 1951 (age 75) Epping, Victoria, Australia
- Party: Liberal Party of Australia
- Spouse: Maureen Mullane
- Children: 3
- Education: La Trobe University
- Profession: Economist, politician
- Website: andrewrobb.com.au

Andrew John Robb AO (born 20 August 1951) is an Australian former politician. He was a member of the House of Representatives from 2004 to 2016, representing the Liberal Party. He served as Minister for Trade and Investment (2013–2016) in the Abbott and Turnbull governments, and also briefly as Minister for Vocational and Further Education in the Howard government in 2007. Before entering parliament, he was the federal director of the Liberal Party and oversaw the party's return to government at the 1996 federal election.

While he was Minister for Trade and Investment, Robb approved Chinese company Shandong Landbridge Group to lease Port Darwin for 99 years. As soon as he left politics, Robb was hired by Shandong Landbridge on a $880,000 per year salary. In 2019, Robb left the position, shortly before a new foreign-interference law took effect.

== Background ==
Robb, one of nine children, was born to Frank and Marie Robb, on a dairy farm in Epping which lies 18 kilometres (11 mi) north of Melbourne. He was educated at Dookie Agricultural College, Parade College and La Trobe University, and has qualifications in economics and agricultural science. He was an agricultural economist with the Victorian Department of Agriculture and a tutor in economics at La Trobe University before being an economist for the National Farmers' Federation, and later executive director of both the National Farmers' Federation and the Cattle Council of Australia.

== Liberal Party federal director ==
Robb became deputy director of the Liberal Party before being appointed chief of staff to Andrew Peacock, then Leader of the Opposition, in 1989. In 1990, after Andrew Peacock's resignation after his election defeat, Robb was appointed federal director of the Liberal Party.

In this capacity Robb worked with the next Leader of the Liberal Party, John Hewson, in the unsuccessful 1993 federal election campaign. Robb claimed in 1991 that Peter Reith and Hewson were spooked into releasing their policies too early. Robb was still federal director when internal Liberal party negative polling was leaked to Kerry O'Brien on Lateline in May 1994 who embarrassed John Hewson with it and led to Hewson's calling a leadership spill where he lost the leadership to Alexander Downer. Robb and Hewson were not on good terms following this. Robb was still Federal Director and campaign manager in 1996 when John Howard after he replaced Downer as leader in 1995, won the 1996 federal election campaign, which defeated the Keating government and brought the Liberals to power after 13 years in Opposition. Howard had to be talked out of dumping Andrew in 1995 from his position as Federal director.

== Professional career ==
Robb resigned in 1997 (he was replaced by Lynton Crosby) and became a business consultant based in Sydney. He was Honorary Finance Director for the NSW Division of the Liberal Party and a member of the NSW State Executive. In that time Robb also sat on the boards of numerous Australian companies including Australia's largest consulting engineering company, Sinclair Knight Merz. Robb was also a board member of community organisations including the Garvan Medical Research Foundation and the 'Big Brothers Big Sisters' organisation. In 2003, Robb was appointed an Officer of the Order of Australia for service to politics, agriculture and the community.

== Parliamentary career ==
=== Howard government ===
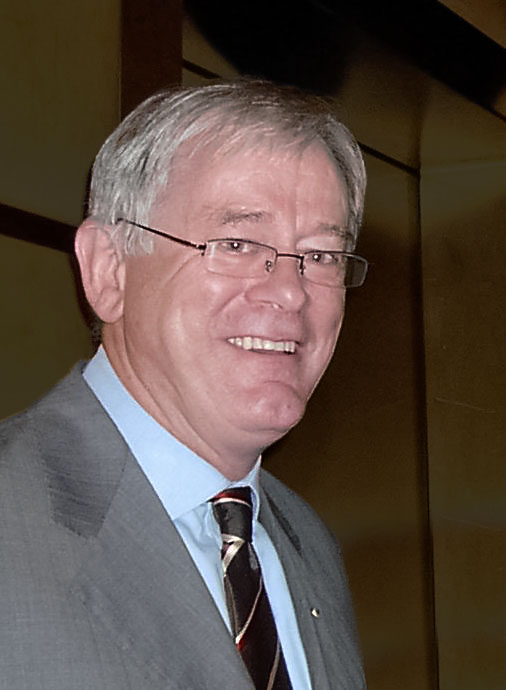
Robb in May 2005

In 2004, he was comfortably elected to the safe Liberal seat of Goldstein in Melbourne and was appointed Parliamentary Secretary to the Minister for Immigration and Multicultural Affairs on 27 January 2006. His time in this portfolio was marked by introducing a Citizenship discussion paper which encouraged public debate about whether Australia required a formal citizenship test. Robb argued that a formal citizenship test would be a clear incentive for aspiring citizens to have basic English language skills and understanding of their community. Robb also focused on dealing with settlement issues for refugees and the challenges of multi-faith relations in Australia.

In 2007, Robb was elevated to the Ministry and took on the role as Minister for Vocational and Further Education. Following the Liberal Party's defeat at the 2007 federal election, Robb put himself forward as a candidate for Deputy Leader of the Liberal Party. In a ballot of Liberal caucus members, Julie Bishop prevailed with 44 votes, ahead of Robb who won 25 votes and Christopher Pyne with 18 votes. The then leader of the Liberal Party, former Defence Minister, Brendan Nelson, announced that Robb would be Shadow Minister for Foreign Affairs in the new Coalition Shadow Cabinet.

Following a front-bench re-shuffle in March 2010, Robb was appointed Shadow Minister for Finance, Deregulation and Debt Reduction, a post previously held by Nationals Senator Barnaby Joyce, and chairman of the Coalition Policy Development Committee. He was re-elected at the 2010 election and was appointed Shadow Minister for Finance, Deregulation and Debt Reduction and retained his position as chairman of the Coalition Policy Development Committee.

Robb is a republican; he is against abortion except where the health and state of the mother are in serious threat.

Robb is also the co-publisher of The Party Room alongside Senator Mitch Fifield, a journal designed to promote new policy discussion within the Federal Coalition.

=== Abbott and Turnbull governments ===
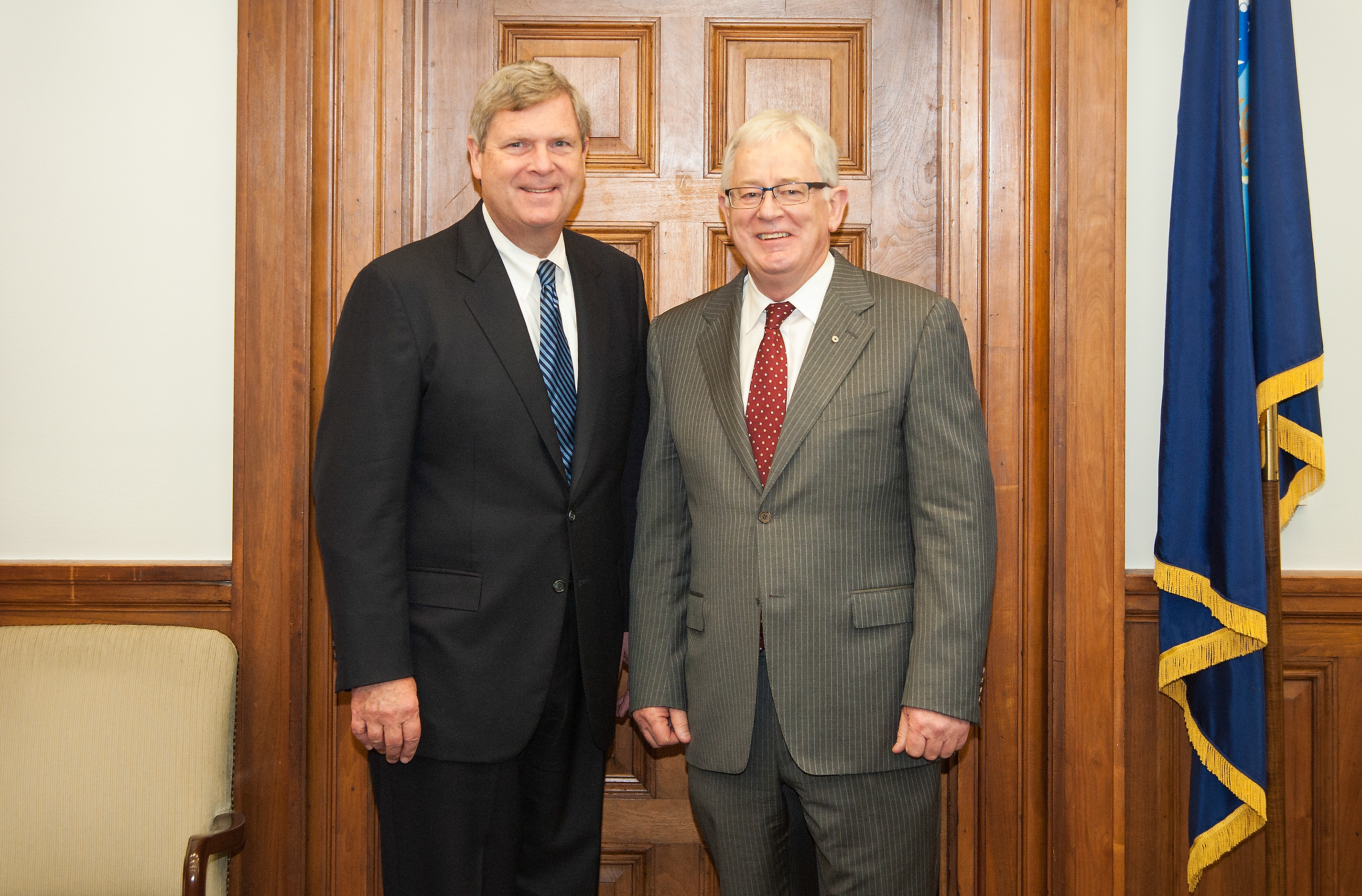
Robb in October 2013 with U.S. Secretary of Agriculture Tom Vilsack

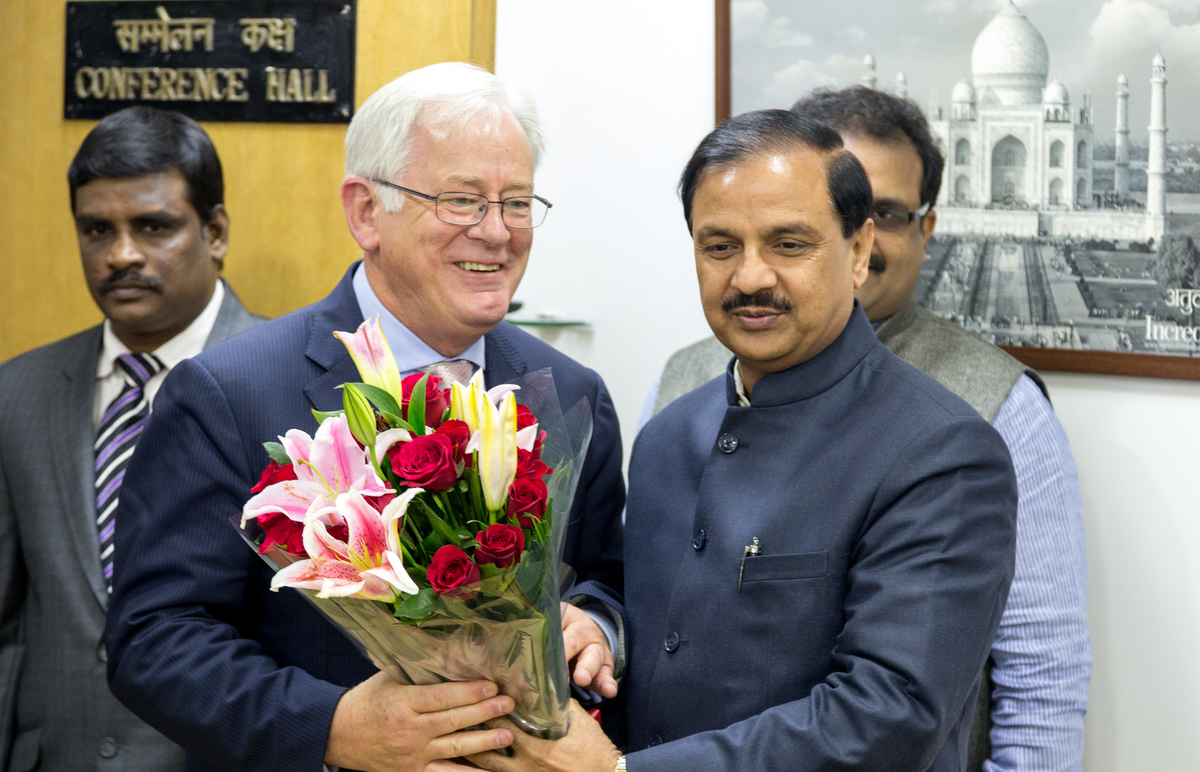
Robb in January 2015 with Indian tourism minister Mahesh Sharma during Australian Business in India Week

Following the election of the Abbott government in 2013, Robb was appointed Minister for Trade and Investment. He had carriage of final negotiations for the Australia–Korea Free Trade Agreement (KAFTA), Japan–Australia Economic Partnership Agreement, China–Australia Free Trade Agreement and the Trans-Pacific Partnership which have concluded by the federal government.

Robb announced his retirement from politics on 10 February 2016. He was succeeded by Steven Ciobo as Minister of Trade and Investment on 18 February 2016.

== Career after politics ==
Robb is a board member of the Kidman cattle enterprise and the Network Ten television station. He is the Chairman of Asialink and CNSDose, and a strategic advisor to Beef Innovations Australia, as well as a range of national and international businesses.

In October 2016, it was announced that Robb had joined the Landbridge Group, a Chinese company which had been granted a 99-year lease on Port Darwin in October 2015, as a "high-level economic consultant". It was reported that Robb had accepted the $73,000 per month position before leaving Parliament. Landbridge Group is chaired by Ye Cheng, a billionaire with links to the Chinese Communist Party. Robb's employment with Landbridge Group ended in 2018. Robb attributed his departure to an atmosphere increasingly critical of the Chinese government; it was also noted that had he remained in the position he would have had to register as a foreign agent, due to changes in legislation enacted in 2019.

Robb is part owner of The Boathouse Group, which operates a number of Sydney restaurants and other venues. Another Robb entity is facing (in mid 2019) a wind-up motion from the Commissioner of Taxation over unpaid taxes.

As of 2020, Robb serves as a director on the board of Mind Medicine Australia, a not-for-profit organisation which promotes the introduction of psychedelic treatments for mental illnesses.

== Personal life ==
During 2009 Laurie Oakes's column in The Australian, Robb disclosed that he was stepping down from the opposition front bench for three months to address a form of depression brought on by diurnal variation, which is typically experienced as positive mood variation (mood being worse upon waking and better in the evening). Robb disclosed that, since adolescence, he had suffered depression for several hours each day in the morning.

The following week, Robb said in an interview with 3AW's Neil Mitchell that he had found "doing things increasingly more difficult, I could be taking on more responsibilities especially in a public sense and decided to confront it a few weeks ago. Rang Jeff Kennett and within three days he had me in front one of the best professionals in the state and this guy said you know you've had a problem for fifty years, you've had it for fifty years but he said it was fixable, which was fantastic."

Parliament of Australia
Preceded by Dr David Kemp	Member for Goldstein; 2004–2016	Succeeded by Tim Wilson
Political offices
Preceded by Gary Hardgrave	Minister for Vocational and Further Education; 2007	Position abolished
Preceded by Richard Marles as Minister for Trade	Minister for Trade and Investment; 2013–2016	Succeeded by Steven Ciobo
