= Asialink =

Australian think tank

Asialink – Sidney Myer Asia Centre
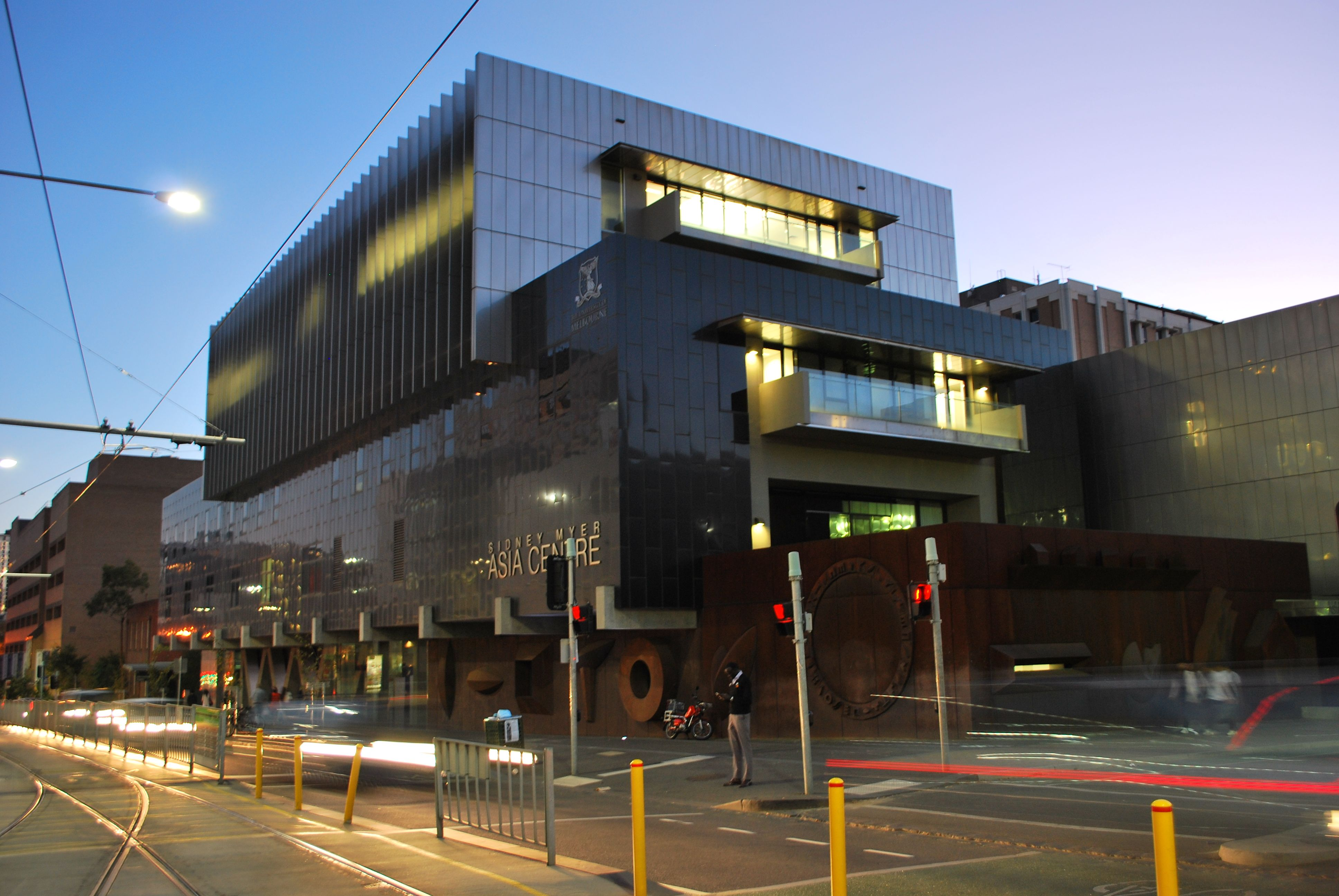
- Asialink's Headquarters
- Established: 1990
- Location: Parkville Victoria, Australia
- Key people: Andrew Robb (Chairman), Penny Burtt (CEO)
- Website: asialink.unimelb.edu.au

Asialink is a think-tank that promotes better relations between Australia and Asian economies. Asialink works alongside several philanthropic organizations to engage in civic and cultural relations that lead to business ties.

== History ==
Asialink was established in 1990 as a joint initiative of the Australian Government's Commission for the Future and the Myer Foundation, one of Australia's oldest and largest philanthropic organizations.

After partnering with the University of Melbourne in 1991, Asialink began to develop programs in education, the arts, businesses and community awareness with the guidance of the Office of the Vice-Chancellor, and the advisory board under Chairman Kenneith Myer AC and Executive chairman Professor Kwong Lee Dow.

In 1998, Asialink became a non-academic department of the University of Melbourne. And in 2001, a grant from the Sidney Myer Centenary Celebration allowed Asialink to build the Sidney Myer Asia Centre, Asialink's current headquarters.

In 2009, Asialink formed a partnership with Asia Society (AustralAsia), which was then concluded in 2011.

In December 2012, Asialink's Singapore Chapter, its first outside of Australia, was launched by Australia's High Commissioner to Singapore, His Excellency Mr Philip Green.

In March 2013, NSW Premier Barry O'Farrell launched Asialink's Sydney office.

In July 2013, the Australian Federal Government announced $36 million of funding over 10 years for the establishment of a national centre for 'Asia capability'. It was recommended by the Asialink Taskforce for an Asia Capable Workforce and is designed to improve the Asia skills of Australia's workforce and deliver long-term benefits to the economy and society in general.

== Programs ==
=== Business ===
Asialink Business provides a range of business training programs, information products, and events.

Established in 2013 with support from the Australian Government, Asialink Business also has the University of Melbourne and the Myer Foundation as key stakeholders.
