= Zoe Daniel =

Australian journalist and politician (born 1972)

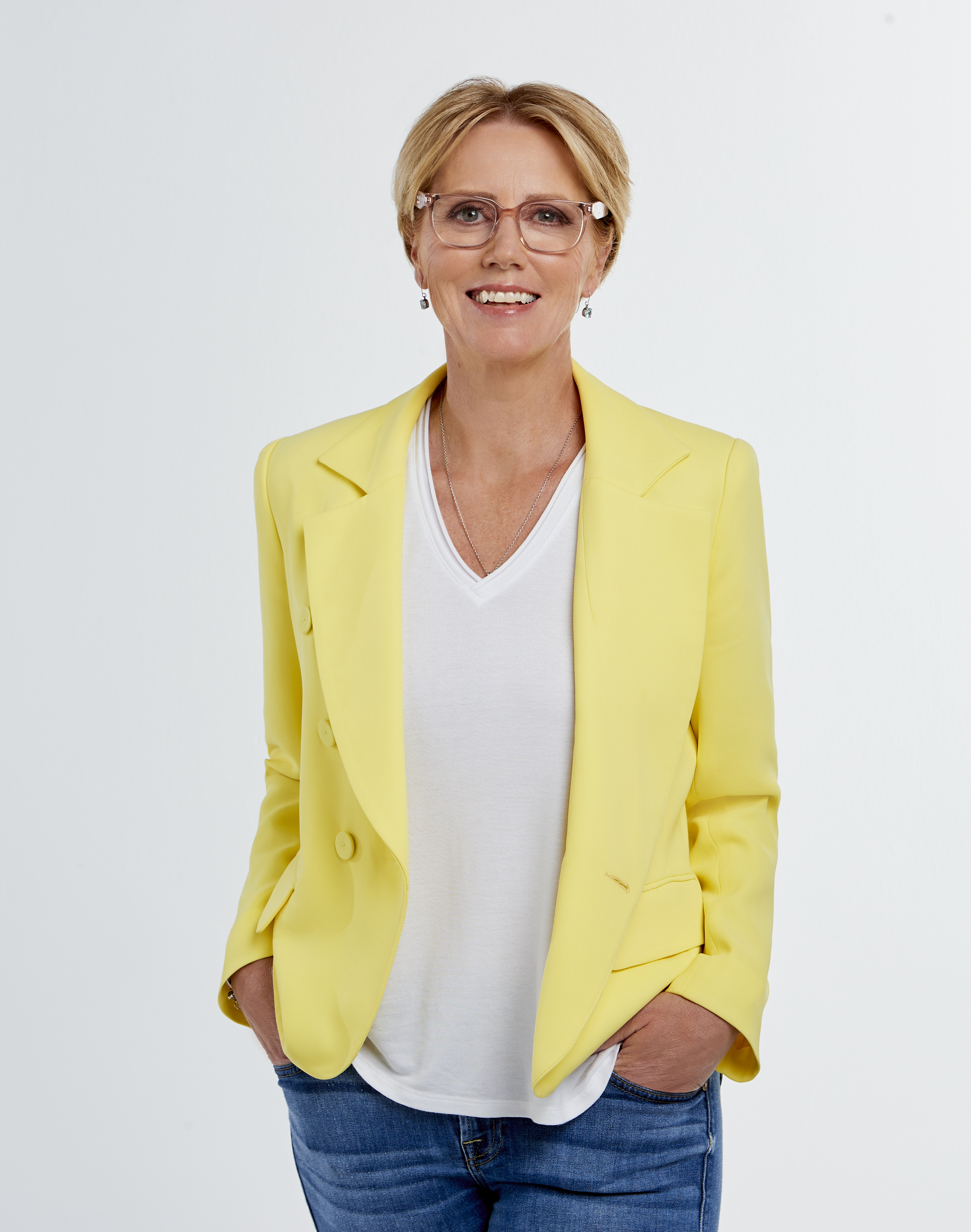
- Zoe Daniel in 2024

Member of the Australian Parliament for Goldstein
- In office 21 May 2022 – 3 May 2025
- Preceded by: Tim Wilson
- Succeeded by: Tim Wilson

Personal details
- Born: 28 November 1972 (age 53) Melbourne, Victoria, Australia
- Party: Independent
- Children: 2
- Occupation: Journalist
- Known for: Foreign correspondent; television host; commentator
- Website: zoedaniel.com.au

Zoe Daniel (born 28 November 1972) is an Australian former journalist and former politician who became the first independent member of parliament for the Division of Goldstein in 2022. She lost the seat at the 2025 election. Daniel was one of a number of community independents, dubbed "teal independents" by the media, who were elected in the 2022 Australian federal election and funded primarily by crowdfunding enterprise, Climate 200.

Prior to entering Parliament, Daniel was a journalist for the taxpayer-funded Australian Broadcasting Corporation (ABC) from 1993 until 2020. She was an ABC foreign correspondent in three different postings, including Southeast Asia, the USA and Africa. Her most recent posting was as the ABC’s U.S. bureau chief between 2015 and 2019, where she led the ABC's coverage of the presidential election between Donald Trump and Hillary Clinton.

== Early life ==
Daniel's father is former Essendon footballer Peter Daniel. The family moved to Launceston, Tasmania, when she was two years old, when her father was working there as a football coach.

== Journalism career (1993–2020) ==
Daniel began working as a journalist and foreign correspondent for the ABC in 1993. Daniel reported on the 2004 Summer Olympics in Athens. Between 2005 and 2007, Daniel was the ABC’s Africa correspondent. While working in Africa, she reported on the regime of Robert Mugabe in Zimbabwe, Sierra Leone civil war, the Darfur genocide and South Sudan. In 2009, she moved to Phnom Penh where she reported on the Khmer Rouge tribunal. From 2009 until 2013, Daniel was the ABC's Southeast Asian correspondent. At the time, Daniel's posting while a mother of young children was unprecedented for ABC correspondents. During her time there she reported on the 2010 Thai political protests and interviewed Aung San Suu Kyi. Daniel left the ABC in July 2020. Her last role with the ABC was as the ABC's Bureau Chief in the US. Daniel wrote a book about her experience covering the 2016 Presidential campaign of Donald Trump, titled Greetings from Trumpland: How an unprecedented presidency changed everything.

As of November 2021, Daniel was writing a column for The New Daily.

== 2022 election campaign ==
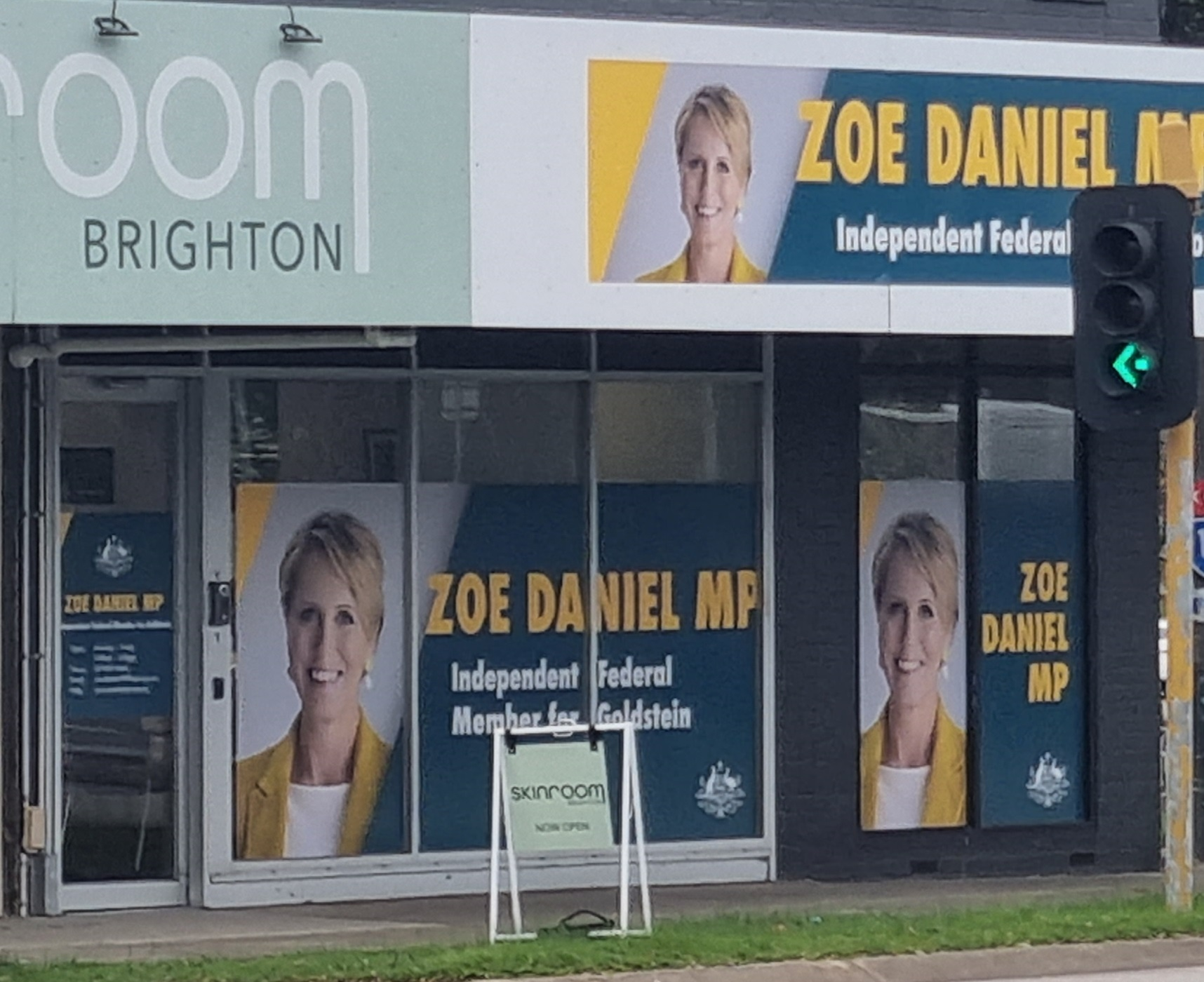
Daniel's former office in Brighton East

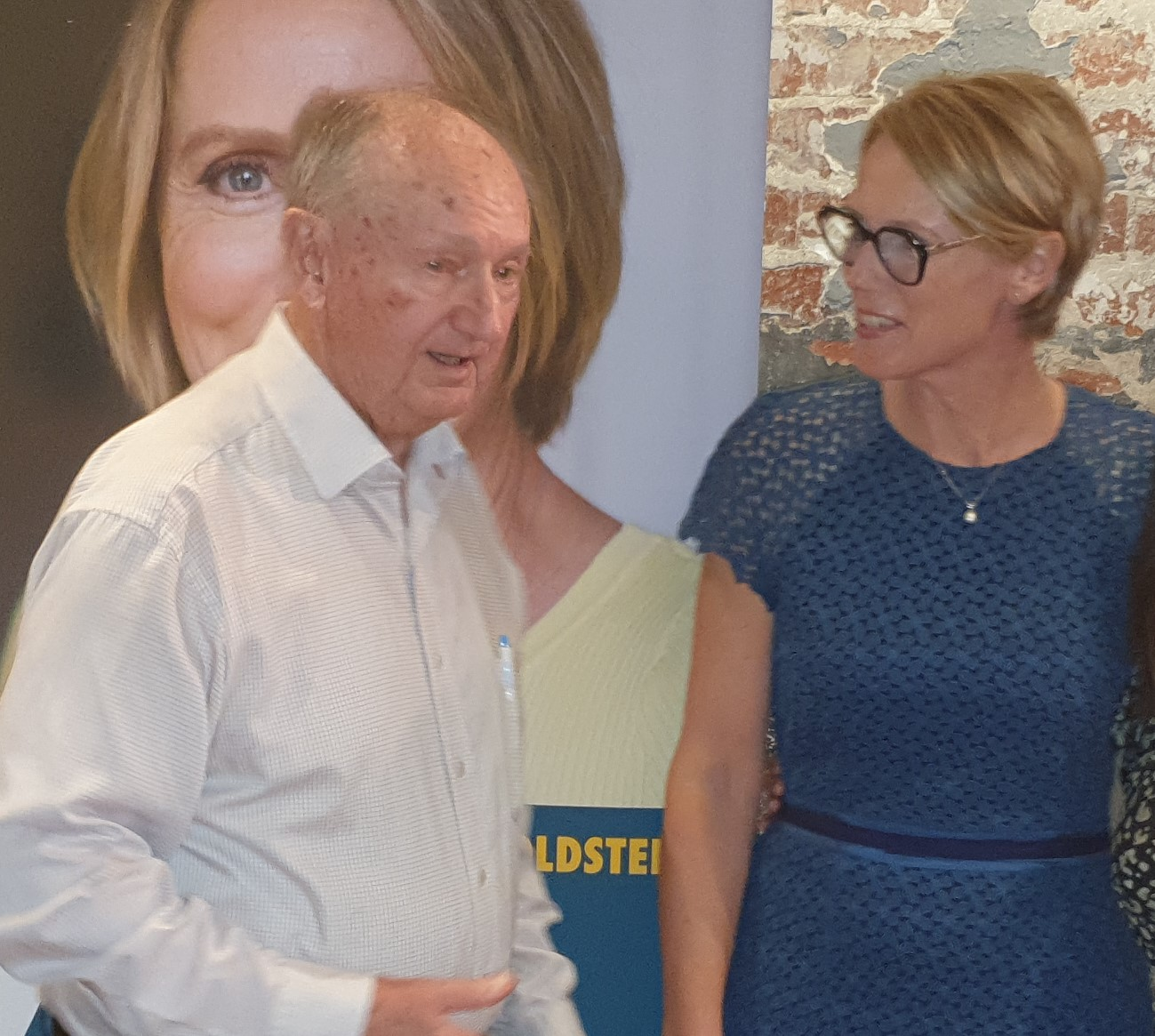
Daniel with Ian Macphee, former MP for Goldstein

Daniel was endorsed by Voices of Goldstein as an independent candidate to run in the 2022 federal election in the seat of Goldstein. Her candidacy was endorsed by former member for Indi, Cathy McGowan, former leader of the Liberal Party, John Hewson, and minister in the Fraser government and former Liberal member for Goldstein, Ian Macphee.

Daniel is a self-described swinging voter, as a consequence of her father's "negative experience of party politics". She describes herself as a "social progressive, economic conservative". She cast her vote for the Liberals at the 2016 Australian federal election on the basis of what she perceived to be Malcolm Turnbull's commitment to addressing the climate crisis. During the campaign, she stated that she had campaigned for "faster and stronger action on climate change, restoration of integrity and trust in politics and real equality and safety for women."

Daniel is part of a network of community independents that campaigned in safe Liberal seats and has been classified as a "teal independent".

Daniel won the seat at the 2022 election, defeating the incumbent Liberal MP Tim Wilson 52.87 to 47.13 2PP. Wilson lost 12 percent of his primary vote from 2019, allowing Daniel to defeat him on the eighth count when over three-fourths of Labor preferences flowed to her. The seat had previously been considered a safe "blue ribbon" seat. Dating to its time as Balaclava, it had been in the hands of the Liberals and their predecessors without interruption since Federation.

Daniel's campaign spent A$1.59 million during the election campaign.

== Member of Parliament (2022–2025) ==
In May 2023, Daniel introduced the Broadcasting Services Amendment (Prohibition Of Gambling Advertisements) Bill 2023. The stated purpose of the Bill is to prohibit the broadcasting of gambling advertisements on television, radio broadcasting services, and on streaming services to end the promotion of gambling during sporting events.

In November 2024, Daniel tabled the Online Safety Amendment (Digital Duty of Care) Bill 2024. The stated purpose of the Bill is to impose an 'overarching duty of care onto large providers' of social media platforms to protect their users.

During the 2022 campaign Daniel campaigned for the establishment of a federal anti-corruption commission. The Albanese Labor Government, who were elected at the 2022 Federal Election, established a National Anti-Corruption Commission (NACC) on 1 July 2023.

In October 2024, former Liberal MP Jason Falinski referred Daniel to the NACC for allegedly misusing Commonwealth-funded staff to lobby on behalf of Simon Holmes à Court, who had been a donor to the campaigns of Daniel and other community independent candidates at the 2022 election. The accusation made was that Holmes à Court objected to being listed on a list made by the Australian Financial Review of powerful Australians, and that a staff member of Daniel's had been instructed to communicate this objection to the AFR. Falinski had been defeated in the 2022 election by community independent, Sophie Scamps. Daniel responded in a media release that the person who was alleged to have lobbied on behalf of Holmes à Court was not employed by the Commonwealth and was not acting on her behalf or with her knowledge. The allegation by Falinski was labelled 'vexatious' by Crikey. Falinski has been closely associated with fellow former Liberal MP Tim Wilson, including co-authoring articles in the Australian Financial Review. On 20 February 2025, the NACC dismissed the case, finding that the individual contacting the AFR was not employed by Daniel as a staffer at the time, and that Daniel was unaware of the contact.

Daniel supports a two-state solution to the Israeli-Palestinian conflict. In August 2023, Daniel travelled to Israel as part of a parliamentary delegation.

== 2025 election campaign ==
Daniel claimed victory on the night of the 2025 election.

On 24 May the AEC announced that the full distribution of preferences was finalised in favour of Tim Wilson.

On the 28th of May the AEC announced that a partial recount would be conducted.

== Personal life ==
Daniel is married to husband Rowan and has two children. She and her family moved to their current home in Hampton in 2013 and her children attended Sandringham Primary School.

Daniel is a supporter and member of the Essendon Football Club.

== Books ==
- Storyteller: A Foreign Correspondent's Memoir, ABC Books, 2014, ISBN 978-0733332319
- Angel: Through My Eyes – Natural Disaster Zones, Allen & Unwin, 2018, ISBN 978-1760113773
- Greetings from Trumpland: How an unprecedented presidency changed everything, Harper Collins, 2021, ISBN 978-0733341519

Parliament of Australia
Preceded by Tim Wilson	Member for Goldstein; 2022–2025	Succeeded by Tim Wilson
