= Australia–Korea Free Trade Agreement =

KAFTA
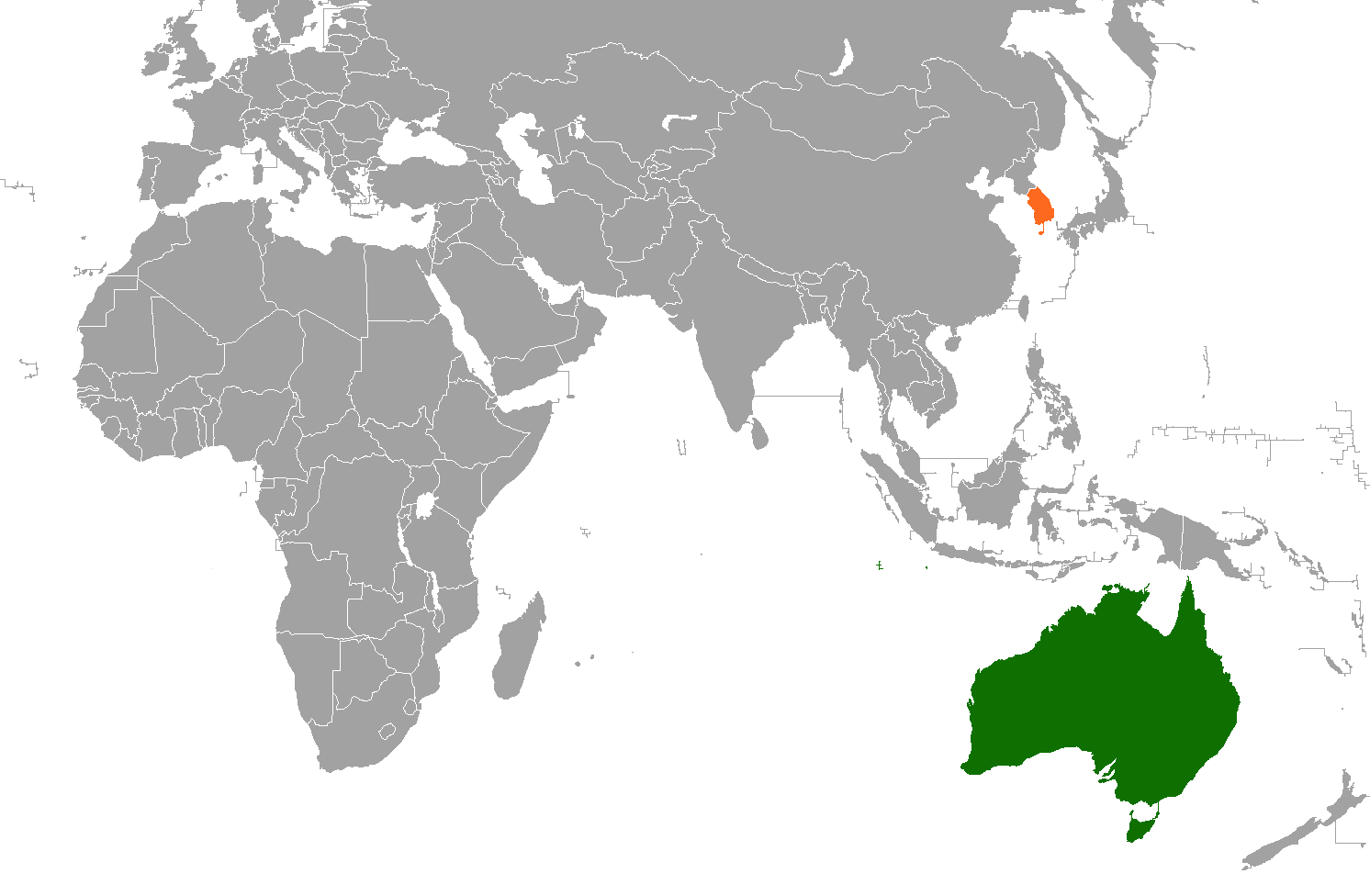
- Map indicating South Korea (orange) and Australia (green)
- Type: Free trade agreement
- Signed: 8 April 2014
- Location: Seoul, South Korea
- Effective: 12 December 2014
- Original signatories: (Australia) Andrew Robb, Minister for Trade and Investment; (South Korea) Yoon Sang-jick, Minister for Trade, Industry and Energy

The Korea–Australia Free Trade Agreement (KAFTA) is a bilateral free trade agreement designed to diminish barriers to trade and investment between Australia and South Korea, effective from 12 December 2014. The agreement intends to improve market access for Australian exporters and to reduce barriers for investors in both countries.

KAFTA builds upon several decades of Australia–South Korea relations, which have evolved since 1962. During that year, South Korean president Park Chung Hee introduced a series of five-year economic plans aimed at improving South Korea's industrial development and involvement in the global economy in the aftermath of the Korean War.

== Historical background ==
Before the Korean War began on 25 June 1950, Australian involvement in the Korean region was very limited. The first documented contact between Korea and Australia occurring in 1889 when a group of Australian missionaries arrived in Busan. Bilateral relations between Australia and South Korea were fostered by both Australia's involvement in the United Nations Commission on Korea in 1947 and during the Korean War, with approximately 17000 Australian soldiers serving to aid South Korea. 1961 saw the establishment of full diplomatic relations between Australia and South Korea with the South Korean consulate general in Sydney elevated to embassy status and the appointment of the first Korean Ambassador to Australia in April 1962. Similarly, Australia established its embassy in Seoul in June 1962. 2021 marked the 60th anniversary of full diplomatic ties between Australia and the ROK. The economic link between Australia and South Korea was also strengthened in the 1960s, when South Korea's rapid industrialization due to the series of five-year plans required vast amounts of raw materials that could be supplied by Australia. Historically, migration has underlined relations between Australia and South Korea. Korean migration to Australia began around the 1970s and has since increased over the decades. The population of Korean immigrants grew from 60 in 1970 to approximately 72,963 people of Korean ethnic origin who have migrated under various categories, including skilled and business migration. This shared bilateral history of Australia and Korea culminated over the five-year negotiation period of KAFTA, encompassing all aspects and provisions of the free trade agreement. Negotiations began with the Australian Labor Party government under Kevin Rudd in 2009 and concluded under the Liberal-National Coalition government of Tony Abbot. Korea is now Australia's fourth largest trading partner and shares a variety of economic, strategic, and political interests both in the Asia-Pacific and worldwide.

== Agreement ==
Australian Trade Minister Andrew Robb and Korean Trade Minister Yoon Sang-jick concluded negotiations on the agreement in early December 2013, with a finalisation of the text of the agreement on 10 February 2014. In April 2014, the Australian Prime Minister Tony Abbott led a trade delegation to Japan, South Korea, and China. The three economies accounted for more than half of all of Australia's two-way trade. While in South Korea, Abbott signed the Australia Korea Free Trade Agreement (KAFTA) with the government of Park Geun-hye in Seoul on 8 April. The agreement went into effect on 12 December 2014.

According to Australia's Department of Foreign Affairs and Trade, Australia and Korea have "one of the strongest and most complementary trading relationships in the Asia-Pacific region. The Korea-Australia Free Trade Agreement (KAFTA) reduces trade and investment barriers, making it easier for Australians to do business with Korea – our 4th largest trading partner."

== Provisions ==
The key provisions of KAFTA are trade, rules of origin, customs, investment and cooperation.

=== Trade in goods ===
Chapter 2 of the KAFTA agreement outlines the provisions of the agreement regarding "Trade in goods". This section outlines the way in which trade can be conducted under the free trade agreement. For example, article 2.3 'Elimination of Custom duties' outlines that 'neither Party shall increase any existing customs duty, or adopt any new customs duty, on an originating good.' As well as that 'each Party shall progressively eliminate its customs duties on originating goods.' Similarly, article 2.9 'Export Duties, Taxes or Other Charges' outlines that 'Neither Party shall adopt or maintain any duty, tax, or other charge on the export of any good to the territory of the other Party, unless the duty, tax, or charge is also adopted or maintained on the good when destined for domestic consumption.'

=== Rules of Origin and Origin Procedures ===
This section of provisions relates to the protocols surrounding rules of origin and origin procedures within the KAFTA agreement. Rules of Origin and Origin Procedures are criteria which determine the origins of a good. This section establishes the KAFTA standards for "Originating Goods", "Wholly Obtained Goods", and the "Regional Value Content". This section also replates to origin procedures including the "Certificate of Origin", "Authorized Bodies", "Discrepancies and Variations" as well as "Record Keeping Requirements", which are deemed essential by both nations in maintaining a productive trade relationship.

=== Customs Administration and Trade Facilitation ===
The objective of the provisions under the section "Customs Administration and Trade Facilitation" are for both Australia and South Korea to:

1. Simplify the customs procedures between the nations.
2. Ensure predictability, consistency and transparency in the application of customs laws, regulations and administrative procedures of each country.
3. Ensure the efficient and expedited clearance of goods.
4. Facilitate trade between the nations.
5. Promote cooperation between the customs administrations of Australia and South Korea.

The above objectives are achieved by the provision of transparency measures, the harmonization of documents and data elements, the use of automated systems in the paperless trading environment, and appeal procedures.

=== Investment ===
The section covers the provisions around investment within and between Australia and South Korea. It encapsulates the majority of KAFTA provisions regarding the financial sector, including national treatment. This relates to the way each nation's financial institution will treat investment from the other nation with the same standards as domestic investment.

Similarly, the "Minimum Standard of Treatment" clause within the investment provision notes that "Each Party shall accord to covered investments treatment in accordance with the customary international law minimum standard of treatment of aliens, including fair and equitable treatment and full protection and security."

=== Cooperation ===
The objective of the section on cooperation is to promote cooperation and the development of new cooperative ventures between Australian and South Korea in the fields of agriculture, fisheries and forestry. This built on top of already existing relationships in politics and business between the two nations to support mutual development and economic growth. This section places importance on cooperation in the industries of agriculture, Energy and Mineral Resources with the establishment of a joint Committee on Agricultural Cooperation as well as a joint Committee on Energy and Mineral Resources Cooperation.

== Outcomes ==
=== Australian Goods Exporters ===
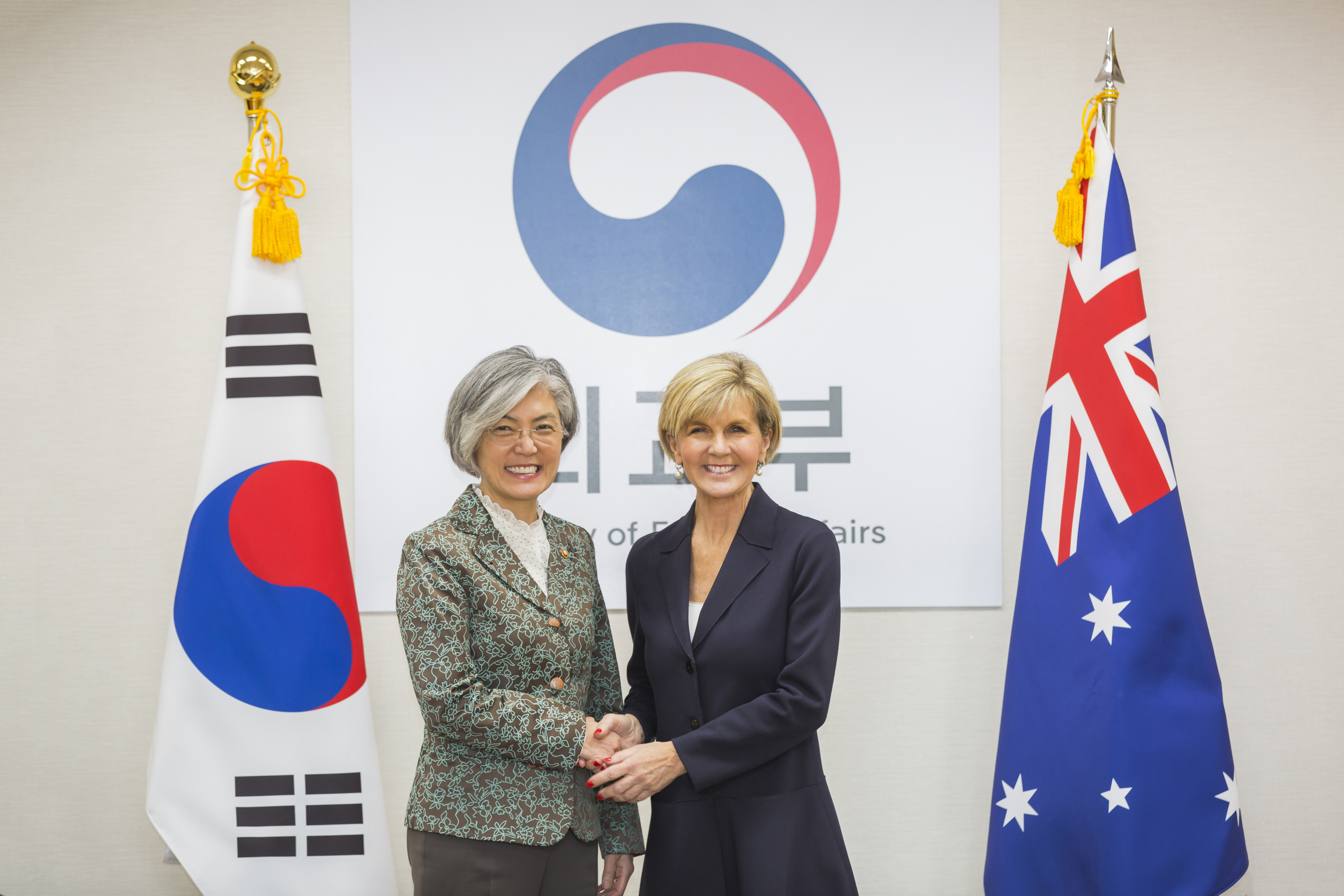
Foreign Ministers Kang Kyung-wha (left) from South Korea and Julie Bishop (right) from Australia at a bilateral meeting, 13 October 2017

Due to KAFTA's provisions, around 99 per cent of goods exported from Australia to Korea are authorized to enter duty-free and with preferential access. For Australia's agricultural sector, tariffs were eliminated on Korean importation of raw sugar, bottled wine, wheat and some horticulture. Australia's beef industry has benefited from KAFTA with South Korea progressively reducing the 40 per cent tariff on beef, aiming for it to be eliminated by 1 January 2028. Australia's dairy industry has also seen benefits, receiving duty free quotas for cheese, butter and infant formula. The manufacturing, resources and energy sectors of Australia's economy have benefited as well, with the removal of all tariffs on their export to Korea progressively phased out by January 1, 2023. This included tariffs on liquefied natural gas, unwrought aluminum and automotive parts. Tariffs on Australian pharmaceutical products have also been eliminated.

=== Australian Services Providers ===
KAFTA has provided Australian services exporters with preferential treatment in the Korean market, benefiting sectors including finance, legal, telecommunications and education. Outcomes include law and accounting firms having the capacity to establish offices in South Korea. On the December 12th, 2016, firms were given permission under the FTA to "enter into cooperative agreements with local law firms". The agreement also stipulates that Australian firms may establish joint ventures and hire local lawyers. For Australian Accountants, KAFTA has made it possible for them to establish offices in Korea and to provide consulting services in Korea on both international and Australian accounting laws. The agreement stipulated that by 12 December 2019, Australian accountants were able to work and invest within accounting firms in South Korea. KAFTA has enabled Australian education and engineering sectors to increase their capacity in the Korean market due to "commitments to guarantee existing market access for Australian providers and work towards improving mutual recognition of qualifications." In May 2015, Engineers Australia signed an agreement with the Korean Government which enhanced the recognition of Australian engineering professionals in South Korea.

=== Investors ===
According to the Australian Department of Foreign Affairs & Trade, KAFTA has improved prospects for Australian investments in Korea and vice versa. The FTA ensures that South Korea will progressively reduce market access barriers to provide more opportunities for Australians to enter the Korean market. Additionally, the Australian government has altered the screening threshold for private Korean investors in "non-sensitive" sectors from 252 million AUD to $1.134 billion AUD. The agreement also stipulates provisions to ensure "non-discrimination, and protection and security for investments" to enhance protection and certainty for Australian and Korean investors. A key clause is the establishment of a "negative list" regime which presumes that a financial service is allowed "unless specifically prohibited and commits Korea to allow new financial services it would permit its own financial institutions to provide."

=== Regional security ===
Whilst an FTA is principally economic in nature and an arrangement for liberalized trade, it often involves security implications. The signing of KAFTA also underlines the shared security concerns of both Australia and Korea in the Indo-Pacific and the Korean Peninsula. Being two middle powers in the Asia-Pacific region, Australia and South Korea share strategic interests and have jointly served in conflicts and peace keeping exercises in relation to non-proliferation of weapons of mass destruction and events on the Korean peninsula that have threatened regional security. The frequency and tempo of military discussions, training exercises and industry cooperation is increasing between Australia and South Korea since the trade agreement's inception. The round of biennial foreign and defense minister meetings in 2019 placed emphasis on a "common strategic outlook". The signing of KAFTA has contributed to the recognition of the relationship between Australia and South Korea being elevated to a comprehensive strategic partnership.

== Reception ==
=== Australia ===
Attitudes towards KAFTA have been mixed since its signing. The Australian Embassy in South Korea reported that after a year of the FTA, "it is already making a big impact", Citing statistics that Koreas exports to Australia rose by 7.5%. Australian consumers have benefited from a larger access to Korean products, creating a positive attitude within the Korean population in Australia towards the agreement. Australian attitudes are also positive due to agricultural exports like beef, nuts and brussel sprouts steadily increasing, creating a larger market for Australia's agricultural industry. KAFTA has also been viewed positively by Australians because they stand to benefit from a robust South Korea due to strong two-way merchandise trade, services trade and direct investment growth as well as the growth of individual connections formed by KAFTA.

Other Australian attitudes have been more concerned. The then Shadow Minister for Trade and Investment Penny Wong suggested KAFTA should be scrutinized in greater depth. She cited a clause in the agreement which grants the Korean Government the right to reimpose large tariffs on Australian beef if exports grow by more than 2% a year. The agreement was criticised by Sharman Stone, a government backbencher at the time of the signing who represented the electorate of Murray in Victoria. Due to this being a largely agricultural electorate, he criticised KAFTA for failing to deliver tariff reductions on a variety of Australian food exports.

=== South Korea ===
In 2014 KAFTA elevated the status of the economic relationship between South Korea and Australia, with South Korea becoming Australia's fourth largest trading partner as a result. Economically this has created a positive sentiment in the Korean market, with greater access to Australian mining and agricultural goods. South Korean attitudes have been positive with migration and education improving the relationship between the two nations in the years since KAFTAs signing. Strategically, South Korea sits in a precarious position and the security relationship formed through KAFTA has been a positive influence strategically for South Korea. President Moon Jae-in described Australia as Korea's "everlasting friend and partner".

Monthly value of Australian merchandise exports to South Korea (A$ millions) since 1988

Monthly value of South Korean merchandise exports to Australia (A$ millions) since 1988
