= Division of Goldstein =

Australian federal electoral division

Coordinates: 37.934°S 145.023°E

Goldstein Australian House of Representatives Division
- Interactive map of electorate boundaries from the 2025 federal election
- Created: 1984
- MP: Tim Wilson
- Party: Liberal
- Namesake: Vida Goldstein
- Electors: 126,189 (2025)
- Area: 56 km^{2} (21.6 sq mi)
- Demographic: Inner metropolitan

The Division of Goldstein (/ɡoʊldstaɪn/) is an Australian Electoral Division in Victoria, Australia. The division was created in 1984, when the former Division of Balaclava was abolished. It is located in the bayside suburbs of Melbourne, including Beaumaris, Bentleigh, Brighton, Caulfield South, Cheltenham (part), Glen Huntly (part), Elsternwick (part), Ormond (part), Gardenvale and Sandringham.

== Geography ==
Since 1984, federal electoral division boundaries in Australia have been determined at redistributions by a redistribution committee appointed by the Australian Electoral Commission. Redistributions occur for the boundaries of divisions in a particular state, and they occur every seven years, or sooner if a state's representation entitlement changes or when divisions of a state are malapportioned.

As a result of a periodical boundary redistribution, from the 2025 Australian federal election, Goldstein's boundaries will move east to include the suburbs of Moorabbin (part) and Bentleigh East (part) and take more of the suburbs of Cheltenham and Highett.

== History ==
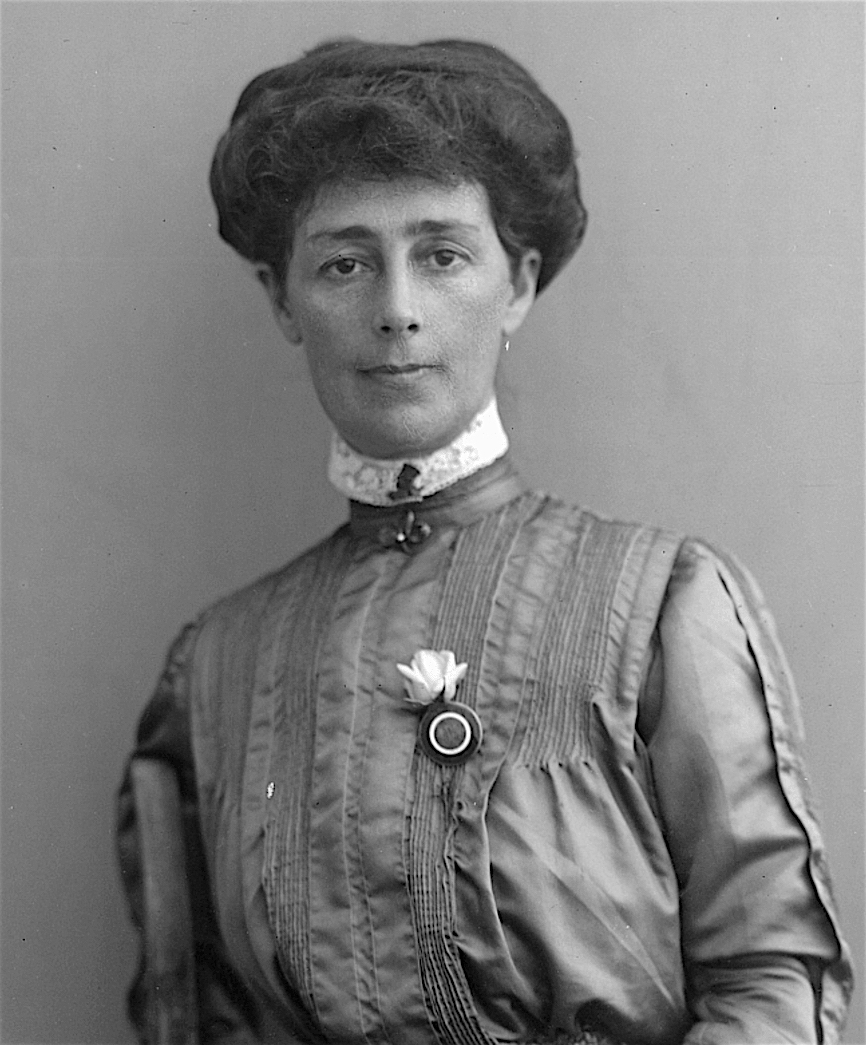
Vida Goldstein, the division's namesake

The division is named after Vida Goldstein, an early parliamentary candidate who contested five separate elections within the first two decades after Federation. The seat was created in 1984 as a reconfigured version of the Division of Balaclava. Like its predecessor, it was historically a safe seat for the Liberal Party; when combined, the seat is one of very few that has never been held by the Labor Party at any point since 1901.

Its most prominent members include Ian Macphee, a minister under Malcolm Fraser and prominent Liberal moderate; and Andrew Robb, a former federal director of the Liberal Party who served as a minister under John Howard, Tony Abbott and Malcolm Turnbull.

The long Liberal run in the seat ended in 2022, when teal independent and former ABC News reporter Zoe Daniel defeated Robb's successor, Tim Wilson. The swing against the Liberals was large enough to drop Goldstein down to marginal in a "traditional" two-party matchup with Labor.

The seat was notable in the 2025 election with it bucking the national trend, being the only seat the Liberals gained in the whole country. The seat was regained by Wilson who contested a rematch against Daniel. This marked the first, and - as of July 2025 - the only time the Liberal Party had defeated an incumbent "teal" independent.

== Members ==
| Image | Member | Party | Term | Notes |
|---|---|---|---|---|
| | Ian Macphee (1938–) | Liberal | 1 December 1984 – 19 February 1990 | Previously held the Division of Balaclava. Lost preselection. Failed to win pre-selection for the Division of Deakin. Retired |
| | David Kemp (1941–) | Liberal | 24 March 1990 – 31 August 2004 | Served as minister under Howard. Retired |
| | Andrew Robb (1951–) | Liberal | 9 October 2004 – 9 May 2016 | Served as minister under Howard, Abbott and Turnbull. Retired |
| | Tim Wilson (1980–) | Liberal | 2 July 2016 – 21 May 2022 | Lost seat |
| | Zoe Daniel (1972–) | Independent | 21 May 2022 – 3 May 2025 | Lost seat |
| | Tim Wilson (1980–) | Liberal | 3 May 2025 – present | Incumbent |

== Election results ==
2025 Australian federal election: Goldstein
| Party | Candidate | Votes | % | ±% |
|---|---|---|---|---|
| Liberal | Tim Wilson | 50,228 | 43.42 | +3.85 |
| Independent | Zoe Daniel | 35,533 | 30.72 | −0.57 |
| Labor | Nildhara Gadani | 15,812 | 13.67 | +0.07 |
| Greens | Alana Galli-McRostie | 8,320 | 7.19 | −1.23 |
| Trumpet of Patriots | Vicki Williams | 2,066 | 1.79 | +1.79 |
| One Nation | Leon Gardiner | 2,037 | 1.76 | +0.31 |
| Libertarian | David Segal | 1,677 | 1.45 | −0.96 |
| Total formal votes | | 115,673 | 97.31 | +0.74 |
| Informal votes | | 3,198 | 2.69 | −0.74 |
| Turnout | | 118,871 | 94.24 | +2.87 |
Notional two-party-preferred count
| Liberal | Tim Wilson | 62,427 | 53.97 | +0.25 |
| Labor | Nildhara Gadani | 53,246 | 46.03 | −0.25 |
Two-candidate-preferred result
| Liberal | Tim Wilson | 57,924 | 50.08 | +1.88 |
| Independent | Zoe Daniel | 57,749 | 49.92 | −1.88 |
| Liberal gain from Independent | | Swing | +1.88 | |
