= Tim Wilson (Australian politician) =

Australian politician (born 1980)

The Honourable Tim Wilson MP
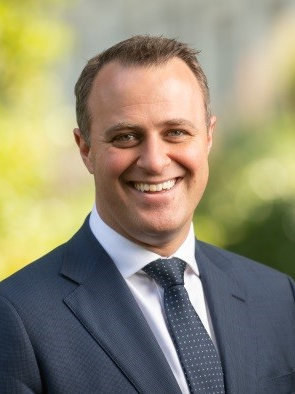
- Campaign portrait, 2020

Shadow Treasurer
- Incumbent
- Assumed office 17 February 2026
- Leader: Angus Taylor
- Preceded by: Ted O'Brien

Shadow Minister for Industrial Relations and Employment
- In office 28 May 2025 – 13 February 2026
- Leader: Sussan Ley
- Preceded by: Michaelia Cash (as Shadow Minister for Employment and Workplace Relations)
- Succeeded by: Jane Hume (as Shadow Minister for Employment and Industrial Relations)

Shadow Minister for Small Business
- In office 28 May 2025 – 13 February 2026
- Leader: Sussan Ley
- Preceded by: Sussan Ley (as Shadow Minister for Small and Family Business)
- Succeeded by: Jacinta Nampijinpa Price

Assistant Minister for Industry, Energy and Emissions Reduction
- In office 8 October 2021 – 21 May 2022
- Prime Minister: Scott Morrison
- Minister: Angus Taylor
- Succeeded by: Jenny McAllister (as Assistant Minister for Climate Change and Energy)

Member of the Australian Parliament for Goldstein
- Incumbent
- Assumed office 3 May 2025
- Preceded by: Zoe Daniel
- In office 2 July 2016 – 21 May 2022
- Preceded by: Andrew Robb
- Succeeded by: Zoe Daniel

Personal details
- Born: Timothy Robert Wilson; 12 March 1980 (age 46) Prahran, Victoria, Australia
- Party: Liberal
- Spouse: Ryan Bolger (m. 2018)
- Education: Monash University; Murdoch University
- Website: Personal website Party website

Timothy Robert Wilson (born 12 March 1980) is an Australian politician. A member of the Liberal Party, he has been the member of Parliament (MP) for the Victorian division of Goldstein since 2025 and from 2016 to 2022, and is the shadow treasurer of the shadow ministry of Angus Taylor.

Prior to entering politics, Wilson worked as a policy director at the conservative think tank, the Institute of Public Affairs (IPA) from 2007 to 2013 and Australia's Human Rights Commissioner from 2014 to 2016.

== Early life ==
Wilson was born on 12 March 1980 in Prahran, Victoria. He is the second of three children. His maternal grandfather immigrated to Australia from Armenia and was a survivor of the Armenian genocide. Wilson has been described by the Armenian National Committee of Australia as a "vocal and prominent supporter of Armenian-Australian issues, fiercely advocating for his government's recognition of the Armenian genocide and solidarity with the indigenous Armenian self-determined Republic of Artsakh".

In his early years, Wilson's parents ran pubs in Richmond and on Little Collins Street. Following their divorce he moved to Mount Martha and attended Mount Martha Primary School and The Peninsula School, Mount Eliza. At Monash University, Wilson studied fine arts before transferring and completing a Bachelor of Arts (Policy Studies) and a Masters of Diplomacy and Trade (International Trade). He was elected President of the Monash University Student Union Caulfield in 2002 and again in 2003.

== Early career ==
=== Institute of Public Affairs (IPA) ===
Wilson was employed by the Institute of Public Affairs for seven years, serving as Director of Climate Change Policy and of Intellectual Property and Free Trade. Wilson studied environmental issues in a variety of postgraduate studies.

=== Human Rights Commissioner (HRC) ===
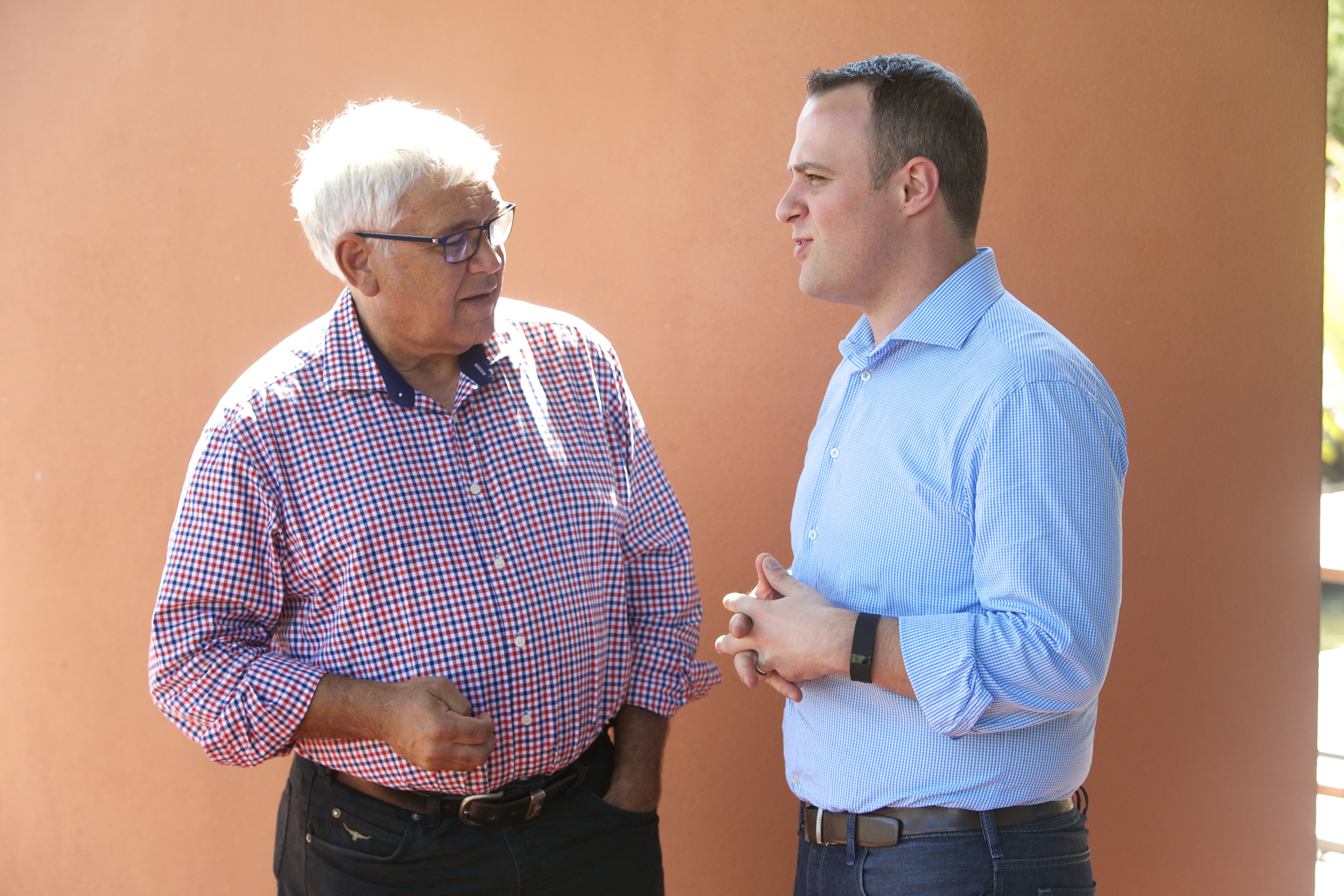
Wilson (right) as Human Rights Commissioner in 2015 with Aboriginal and Torres Strait Islander Social Justice Commissioner Mick Gooda

During his time at the IPA, Wilson was a vocal critic of the Human Rights Commission and called for the abolition of the Commission.

He was appointed as Australia's Human Rights Commissioner between February 2014 and February 2016. On appointment to the Human Rights Commission, Wilson resigned his membership of the Liberal Party.

It was reported that in the first year following his appointment, Wilson claimed $77,000 in expenses, including almost $15,000 in taxi fares, computer equipment, including $1,400 on a desk and $37,000 on airfares. Wilson's response to these charges was, "You'd rather I sit in my office all day?" The Australian Human Rights Commission stated that "The travel expenses of commissioners are proportionate to the work required to fulfil their statutory obligations" and that Wilson "completed two major national consultations which required travel to remote, rural and regional Australia as well as capital cities".

In July 2020, it was revealed that, while a commissioner, he had used his Commission email account to introduce a prominent international speaker to the Institute of Public Affairs for an event, as well as arrange his attendance at the free market think-tank's functions, and to obtain from someone an endorsement in support of his campaign to gain Liberal preselection for Parliament. Wilson acknowledged that he had opposed the release of the emails, which had been sought through a freedom of information application, but considered them "utterly irrelevant" and a "non-story”, saying his support of the IPA was publicly disclosed and well known throughout his term. Furthermore Wilson stated he originally halted the release of the emails to toy with the freedom of information applicant to "make sure the applicant thought there was something salacious in these emails only to be disappointed that they were utterly irrelevant and they'd wasted their time, and sadly that of the hard-working people at the Australian Human Rights Commission, who had to compile and redact these documents".

== Political career ==
=== Early campaign ===
In 2008, Wilson, then a Liberal Party member, ran for the position of deputy mayor of the City of Melbourne in a joint ticket with Peter McMullin, a former Labor mayor of Geelong. Wilson and McMullin lost.

=== Federal parliament ===
==== First and second terms ====
On 19 March 2016, Wilson was preselected as the Liberal candidate for the seat of Goldstein. He defeated Denis Dragovic by two votes. Fellow IPA employee, Georgina Downer was also a preselection candidate, but lost in the first round of voting. As recently as 2014, Wilson did not live in the electorate, but moved into the electoral boundaries in anticipation for the election.

Wilson was subsequently elected to the Australian House of Representatives at the 2016 Australian federal election. He is a member of the Moderate faction of the Liberal Party.

In his first term, he served on the Standing Committee on Health, Aged Care and Sport, the Standing Committee on Industry, Innovation, Science and Resources and the Standing Committee on Social Policy and Legal Affairs.

When Prime Minister Malcolm Turnbull called a spill of leadership positions in 2018, Wilson supported Turnbull against Peter Dutton. Following the vote to remove Turnbull, Wilson moved his support behind the eventual winner, Scott Morrison as the new Liberal leader and Prime Minister.

In 2018, Wilson was appointed by Scott Morrison as the chair of the House of Representatives Standing Committee on Economics.

Wilson won a second term at the 2019 election.

Wilson was promoted to be an Assistant Minister in September 2021. He was named as the assistant to Angus Taylor, responsible for the areas of industry, energy and emissions reduction.

==== 2022 election campaign ====
Prior to the 2022 federal election, community group Voices of Goldstein announced that they were endorsing former ABC journalist Zoe Daniel as an independent candidate for the election.

Wilson lost his seat to Daniel and suffered a 12 percent primary vote swing against him.

===== Fence signs controversy =====
Prior to the election being called, Wilson wrote to people in his constituency claiming it was "unlawful to erect signs until after the election has been called." Wilson called on people to pass on the personal details of any signs. Bayside council confirmed that they had no intention of fining residents and that the signs were erected legally as it was within three months of 21 May, the last date for a joint House and Senate election, but Wilson claimed that the council had "flipped" as their initial advice to him was different. The council later removed the advice from their website on appeal from Wilson, since technically a House election can happen separately from the Senate and be held as late as 3 September. Daniel's campaign director challenged the decision in the Supreme Court, which ruled that the signs were legal. The Age called the ruling a "humiliating result" for Bayside Council.

Wilson's election sign campaign was cited by Tony Wright of The Age as an example of the Streisand Effect when an attempt to hide, remove, or censor information has the unintended consequence of increasing awareness of that information.

=== Between terms (2022–2025) ===
In April 2023, Wilson stepped up to lay a wreath during an Anzac Day service in Beaumaris reserved for then Goldstein MP Daniel alongside a volunteer who had agreed to represent her. The volunteer was later filmed criticising Wilson for his actions calling them inappropriate. Daniel's office stated that a volunteer was sent to lay the wreath on her behalf and asked that community representatives be respected. Wilson defended his actions, saying he was asked to do so by an RSL staff member because Daniel was not in attendance.

==== 2025 election ====
In March 2024, Wilson won the Liberal Party preselection for the seat of Goldstein for the 2025 election. He went on to defeat Daniel, following a partial AEC recount. He gained a swing of 3.85%.

=== Opposition (2025–present) ===
==== Shadow minister ====
Following Sussan Ley's election to leader of the Liberal Party, Wilson was appointed to the shadow ministry, holding the portfolios of shadow minister for industrial relations and employement, and shadow minister for small business. Ley's shadow ministry was revealed on 28 May 2025. Following Ley's resignation, under the Taylor shadow ministry, Wilson was appointed as shadow treasurer.

== Political positions ==
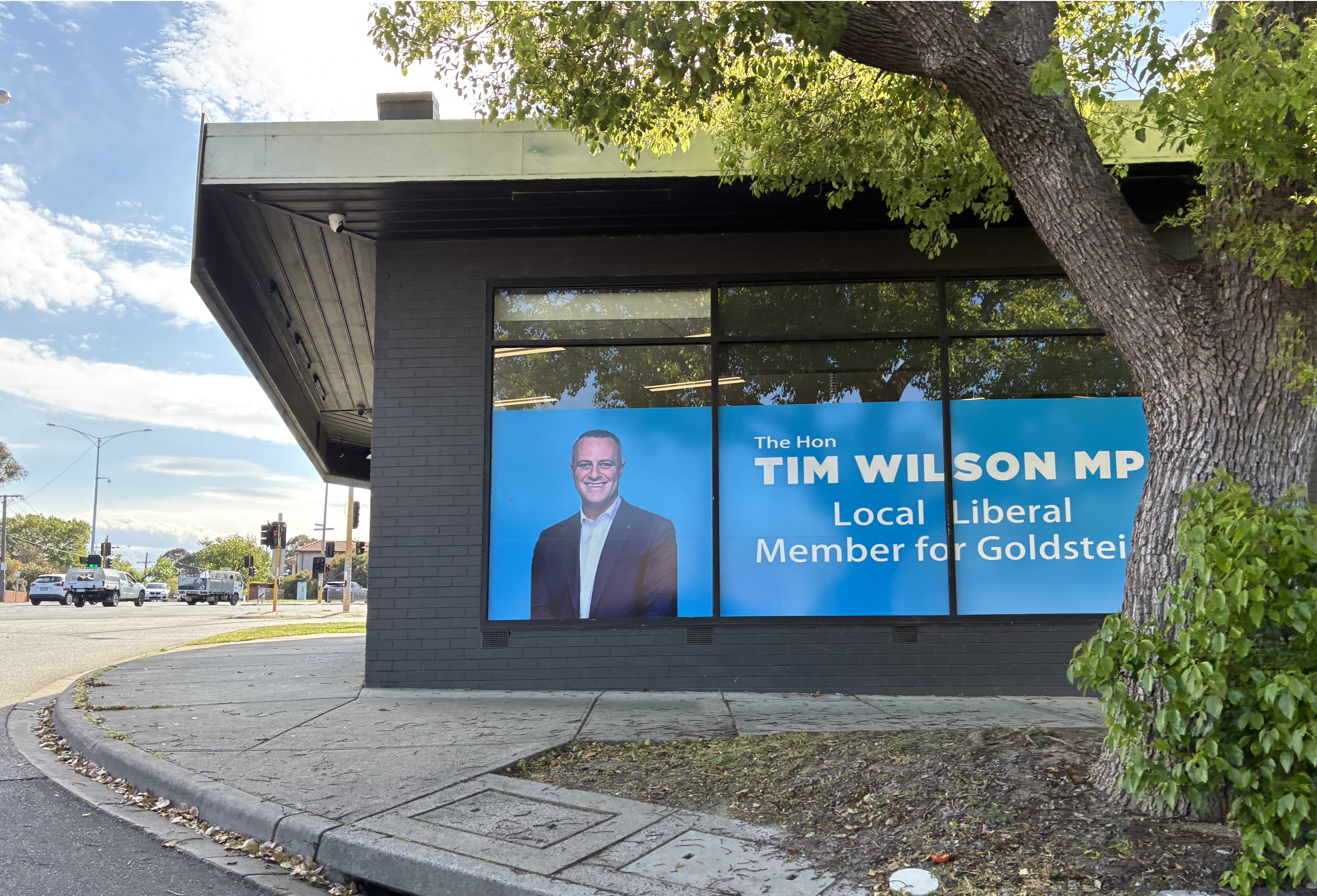
Wilson's electoral office in Brighton East

=== Climate and environment ===
Whilst Director of Climate Change Policy at the Institute of Public Affairs (IPA), Wilson argued against Australia being a party to the Kyoto Protocol and was against any government prices on carbon. Following the 2019 election win, Wilson endorsed the cuts under the Kyoto and Paris Agreement and claimed that the Liberal Party would meet their targets, a reverse of their position prior to the election.

During Wilson's tenure as a policy director at the IPA, the group called for the closing of the Climate Change Authority, the ending of the Renewable Energy Target and defunding of the Australian Renewable Energy Agency and the Clean Energy Finance Corporation.

Despite personally not expressing climate change denial, Wilson has endorsed people's right to express such views and was opposed to universities preventing such views from being taught in their institutions. Wilson himself explained that he has an "open mind" regarding the science behind climate change.

=== LGBT issues ===
Wilson is openly gay and has advocated for equality for same-sex relationships and marriage.

Wilson defended the rights of free speech in religious groups regarding LGBT people. He was praised by the Australian Christian Lobby for this stance. In 2022 he defended the free speech rights of Margaret Court who was accused of homophobic beliefs, and rejected the public calls to remove her name from Margaret Court Arena.

==== Same-sex marriage ====
Wilson had been a public advocate for same-sex marriage for more than a decade prior to its becoming legally recognised in Australia.

The Abbott government in 2015 promised a public vote on same-sex marriage, which remained the Coalition policy for the Turnbull government. Following the 2016 federal election, Wilson supported the legislation for a public plebiscite on the basis that it was the fastest route to reform, although other advocates for the amendments to the law suggested the quickest and cheapest way was through a conscience vote on the floor of parliament.

Wilson opposed efforts to block the Australian Marriage Law Postal Survey in the High Court and continued as a prominent Liberal campaigner for the "yes" vote during the plebiscite process.

=== Freedom of speech and human rights ===
Wilson is an advocate of almost all speech being able to be expressed in public.

He also argued against plain package cigarettes as an attack on the property rights of the cigarette companies, and was against the anti-bikie laws in Queensland, that aimed to hamper the criminal activities of several motorcycle gangs.

However, he supported the right of the public broadcaster SBS to dismiss a sports reporter who had expressed views critical of Anzac Day.

==== 18C of the Racial Discrimination Act ====
During his time in the IPA, he pushed to repeal Section 18C of the Racial Discrimination Act which outlaws offensive behavior because of "race, colour or national or ethnic origin". When testifying before the senate committee he was unsure if freedom from discrimination should exist, and that he was defending the human rights of minorities to express their opinions. Wilson called the laws "democratically dangerous".

During the term of his appointment he supported the Abbott government's attempted changes to Section 18C of the 1975 Racial Discrimination Act. Wilson argued that 18C was ineffective in preventing racial discrimination and instead asserted civil codes of conducts imposed by employers, industry and community groups would bring cultural change. In one instance, when questioned if he accepted that any person had the right to use racial slurs including the word "nigger" he replied "I won't say it, but that's right", while adding that "even petty and casual racism is unacceptable".

Wilson argued that under the existing laws, it would create severe limits on what could be said in the public sphere, for example, he claimed that a magazine such as Charlie Hebdo would not be able to be published in Australia without censorship. However the Executive Council of Australian Jewry called Wilson's arguments "wrong" and "hysterical nonsense".

=== Franking credits ===
When Scott Morrison ascended to the prime ministership, he appointed Wilson as Chair of the House of Representatives Standing Committee on Economics. Under Wilson's tenure, the Committee launched an inquiry into Labor's election promise, the proposed changes to refundable franking credits, holding a series of public hearings around the country. Wilson argued that Labor's policy constituted a "retiree tax" that would damage the savings and superannuation balances of up to one million retirees. Opponents of the hearings saw the process as a series of sham hearings aimed at advancing the Coalition's agenda.

It was later revealed that the inquiry had a number of legal and procedural issues that were directly linked back to Wilson.

- On 31 October, Wilson anonymously registered the domain stoptheretirementtax.com to allow people to register to speak before the inquiry. The site had a commonwealth coat of arms and also solicited submissions.
- Wilson sent a letter out urging people "to campaign against Labor's retirement tax". The letter had both the Commonwealth logo and Liberal Party branding, a clear breach of Commonwealth guidelines.
- Wilson arranged for meetings to coincide with an activist group opposing Labor's policy and contained the "possible intention to engage in protest activity at the hearing". As the chair, he also tolerated the handing out of political party material at the hearings. This was one of the actions he would later be rebuked for by the speaker.
- Wilson brought in a cousin, Geoff Wilson, to assist in the inquiry. Geoff Wilson managed an investment fund that he founded. The fund was revealed to have a value of $3 billion, and Tim Wilson had funds under management. Geoff Wilson was recorded talking about how he was using a taxpayer-funded inquiry to defeat a policy that he was opposed to.

In February 2019, Labor accused Wilson of improperly interfering with the committee's inquiry into dividend imputations and had committed a contempt of parliament. The Speaker found that while no contempt had been committed, Wilson had not honoured committee conventions and rebuked Wilson for the manner in which the inquiry took place.

=== Superannuation and housing ===
Wilson has been a long-time critic of the superannuation industry and an advocate for using super contributions to fund a deposit on housing.

In September 2020, Wilson was criticised in responding to concerns regarding the level of the superannuation guarantee rate for women on Twitter with "[I'd prefer that] they can buy their own home so they're not homeless".

He then began a push for people to be able to use their superannuation to pay for a deposit on a house. Wilson began using the hashtag on Twitter of #homefirstsupersecond to support his campaign.

There were a number of negative reactions to Wilson's policy including former prime minister Malcolm Turnbull calling it "the craziest idea I've heard" and said that the policy had "some really poor arguments". According to a study by The McKell Institute Wilson's idea would send house prices soaring and would leave most investors worse off in the long term.

Others focused on several tweets by Wilson that appeared to be giving unlicensed financial advice.

The chief executive of Industry Super Australia said that Wilson had "a clear conflict of interest", Wilson responded by saying the group was "bullying" the government.

=== COVID-19 ===
Amid the 2020 COVID-19 pandemic, Wilson wrote to the Australian Human Rights Commission (as a previous head) and the Victorian Equal Opportunity & Human Rights Commission asking whether the Andrews Government's COVID-19 curfew could be justified on human rights grounds and whether there were ground for the commissions to take action to protect rights and freedoms. Wilson stated that he believed the curfew was "unjustified and does not meet the justification for a limitation on Victorians' human rights" due to public statements by the Chief Health Officer and Victorian Police Commissioner.

During the pandemic, Wilson was also critical of the actions of commercial airlines in relation to excessive fees charged to stranded overseas Australians, describing the process as "gouging". Wilson called on National Cabinet to increase the number of Australians able to return from overseas on a state-by-state basis.

=== My Health Record scheme ===
Following the announcement by the Turnbull government of a deadline for Australians to opt out of the My Health Record scheme, Wilson publicly opted out and called for the Government to make "opt-in" the default position because of privacy concerns.

=== Australian relations with China ===
When he was at the IPA, Wilson accepted an all-expenses-paid trip to China, paid for by Huawei.

After entering parliament, Wilson became a member of the "Wolverines", an informal parliamentary group that takes a critical view of Chinese diplomatic policy. Alongside fellow Wolverine James Paterson, Wilson accused Chinese telecoms company Huawei of creating surveillance systems for the Chinese government and urged the United Kingdom to ban the company. He has said that Huawei is a “greater moral evil” than poker machines.

Wilson has supported anti-government protestors in Hong Kong.

Wilson has been criticised by Chinese dissident artist Badiucao for being “all talk, no action”.

=== Support for Israel ===
According to an advertisement on the front page of the 25 October 2024 Melbourne edition of the Australian Jewish News, Wilson declared himself to be "proudly Zionist".

== Personal life ==
Wilson grew up in the Mornington Peninsula with his mother, Linda. His stepfather is Victorian politician David Morris.

Wilson is openly gay. Wilson proposed to his partner, Ryan Bolger, on the floor of parliament while giving a speech on the amendments to the marriage act on 4 December 2017. Both the proposal and Bolger's affirmative answer were recorded in Hansard and went viral on the internet. They were married on 11 March 2018.

Wilson said about his religious beliefs, "I'm more of an agnostic, but I prefer to say that I haven't found God, but I'm on a journey and I may one day find God."

After losing his seat in the 2022 Australian federal election, it has been reported that Wilson is planning on utilising his experience as a junior minister for industry, energy and emissions reduction to set up his own climate and energy advisory business.

Wilson supports the Melbourne Demons in the Australian Football League (AFL).

== Publications ==
- Wilson, Tim (2020). The new social contract : renewing the liberal vision for Australia. Redland Bay, QLD. ISBN 978-1-922449-03-0. OCLC 1192988398.

Parliament of Australia
Preceded by Andrew Robb	Member for Goldstein; 2016–2022	Succeeded by Zoe Daniel
Parliament of Australia
Preceded by Zoe Daniel	Member for Goldstein; 2025-present	Incumbent
