= Japan–Australia Economic Partnership Agreement =

2015 treaty

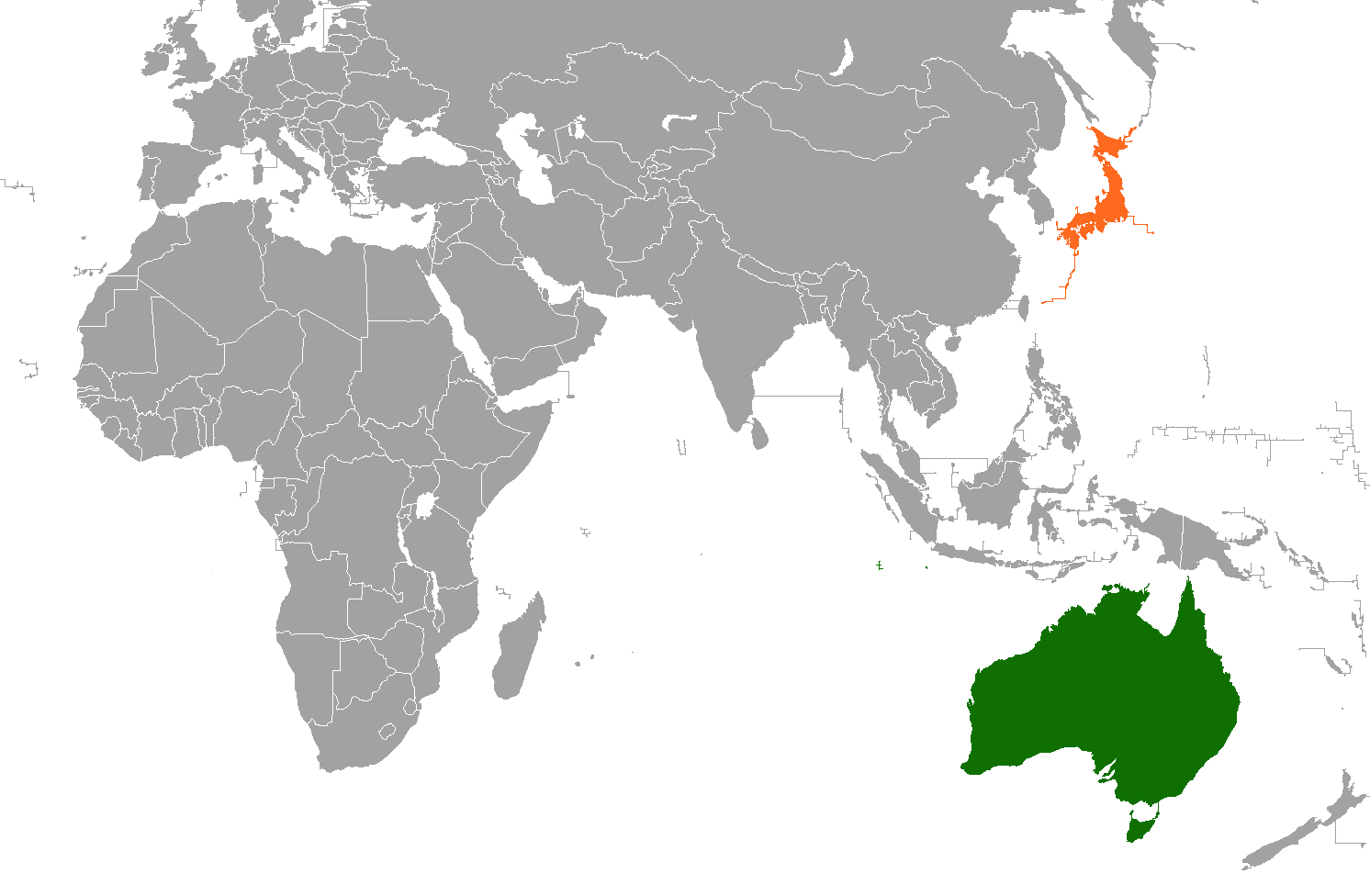
- Type: Trade agreement
- Effective: 2015; 11 years ago
- Parties: Australia; Japan

The Japan–Australia Economic Partnership Agreement (JAEPA) is a trade agreement between Australia and Japan. The negotiations for the agreement were concluded in 2014 and it took effect on January 15, 2015.

== Background ==
Monthly value (A$ millions) of merchandise imported to Australia from Japan since 1988

Monthly value (A$ millions) of merchandise exported from Australia to Japan since 1988

Australia's negotiations for an agreement with Japan began under the Howard government in 2007. In April 2014, Australia's Prime Minister Tony Abbott led a trade delegation to Japan, South Korea and China. The three economies accounted for more than half of all of Australia's two-way trade. On the Japanese leg, Abbott was received by Emperor Akihito and, secured the key elements of a free trade agreement with the government of Shinzo Abe.

A number of concessions were secured for Australian agricultural exporters, Australian tariffs on electronics, whitegoods and cars were to be lowered. Negotiations for the agreement began under the Howard government in 2007. Abbott said, "This is the first time that Japan has negotiated a comprehensive economic partnership agreement or free trade agreement with a major economy, particularly a major economy with a strong agricultural sector." Prime Minister Abe traveled to Australia in July to sign the Japan–Australia Economic Partnership Agreement, and address the Australian Parliament.

Australia's Department of Foreign Affairs said: "The agreement will provide valuable preferential access for Australia's exports and is by far the most liberalising trade agreement Japan has ever concluded. Australia and Japan are natural partners with highly complementary economies. The agreement will bring our economies and societies even closer and underpin a strong relationship for many years to come."

While the prior tariff on new car imports from Japan was eliminated, the agreement included a flat $12000 fee on imports of used vehicles from Japan.

== After ==
With the commencement of the Japan free trade agreement in 2015, employers no longer need to offer jobs to locals or to prove that none could fill vacancies before Japanese nationals eligible for 457 visas are employed.
