= Candidates of the 2022 Australian federal election =

At the close of nominations a total of 1,624 candidates had stood for the 2022 Australian federal election, of whom 1,203 were House of Representatives candidates and 421 were Senate candidates.

== Retiring members ==
The seat of Spence (SA) was vacant following the resignation of Nick Champion (Labor) on 22 February 2022 to contest the South Australian state election. A Senate seat in New South Wales was vacant following the resignation of Kristina Keneally (Labor) on 11 April 2022 to contest the lower house seat of Fowler in the election. A second Senate seat in Western Australia was initially vacant at the close of nominations following the resignation on 15 April 2022 of Ben Small (Liberal), who had discovered that he was ineligible on the grounds of dual citizenship. Having renounced his New Zealand citizenship, Small was re-appointed on 18 May 2022 and contested the election. George Christensen, previously a Nationals member, did not re-contest the seat of Dawson but ran instead for the Senate for One Nation.

The following Members of Parliament (MPs) and Senators did not contest the election.

=== Labor ===
- Sharon Bird MP (Cunningham, NSW) – announced retirement on 19 November 2021
- Anthony Byrne MP (Holt, Vic) – announced retirement on 3 March 2022
- Joel Fitzgibbon MP (Hunter, NSW) – announced retirement on 12 September 2021
- Chris Hayes MP (Fowler, NSW) – announced retirement on 24 March 2021
- Julie Owens MP (Parramatta, NSW) – announced retirement on 28 October 2021
- Warren Snowdon MP (Lingiari, NT) – announced retirement on 10 December 2020
- Senator Kim Carr (Vic) – announced retirement on 27 March 2022

=== Liberal ===
- John Alexander MP (Bennelong, NSW) – announced retirement on 12 November 2021
- Kevin Andrews MP (Menzies, Vic) – lost preselection on 31 January 2021
- Nicolle Flint MP (Boothby, SA) – announced retirement on 26 February 2021
- Greg Hunt MP (Flinders, Vic) – announced retirement on 2 December 2021
- Steve Irons MP (Swan, WA) – announced retirement on 24 September 2021
- Andrew Laming MP (Bowman, Qld) – announced retirement on 28 March 2021, disendorsed on 12 April 2021 after refusal to withdraw preselection nomination
- Christian Porter MP (Pearce, WA) – announced retirement on 1 December 2021
- Tony Smith MP (Casey, Vic) – announced retirement on 14 July 2021
- Senator Concetta Fierravanti-Wells (NSW) – lost preselection 26 March 2022, announced retirement 2 April 2022

=== Nationals ===
- Damian Drum MP (Nicholls, Vic) – announced retirement on 3 December 2021
- Ken O'Dowd MP (Flynn, Qld) – announced retirement on 5 January 2021

== House of Representatives ==
Sitting members are listed in bold text. Successful candidates are highlighted in the relevant colour.

=== Australian Capital Territory ===
Electorate	Held by	Labor	Liberal	Greens	UAP	One Nation	Others
Bean	Labor	**David Smith**	Jane Hiatt	Kathryn Savery	Sean Conway	Benjamin Ambard	Jamie Christie (Ind)
Canberra	Labor	**Alicia Payne**	Slade Minson	Tim Hollo	Catherine Smith	James Miles	Tim Bohm (Ind)
Fenner	Labor	**Andrew Leigh**	Nathan Kuster	Natasa Sojic	Timothy Elton	Lucia Grant	Guy Jakeman (LDP)

=== New South Wales ===
Electorate	Held by	Labor	Coalition	Greens	UAP	One Nation	Others
Banks	Liberal	Zhi Soon	**David Coleman** (Lib)	Natalie Hanna	Marika Momircevski	Malcolm Heffernan (Note: Heffernan was both the One Nation candidate for the NSW division of Banks, and the Australian Federation Party candidate for the WA division of Brand. This led to him being referred to the Australian Federal Police as it is illegal to stand in multiple electorates simultaneously.)	Elouise Cocker (LDP); Steve Khouw (-)
Barton	Labor	**Linda Burney**	John Goody (Lib)	Taylor Vandijk	Dimitri Honos	Phillip Pollard	
Bennelong	Liberal	Jerome Laxale	Simon Kennedy (Lib)	Tony Adams	Rhys Collyer	Victor Waterson	John August (FP); Dougal Cameron (LDP); Kyinzom Dhongdue (DPDA)
Berowra	Liberal	Benson Koschinski	**Julian Leeser** (Lib)	Tania Salitra	Christopher Martinic	Rhiannon Bosma	Benjamin Caswell (Ind); Brendan Clarke (FP); David Louie (AFP); Nicholas Samios (LDP); Roger Woodward (Ind)
Blaxland	Labor	**Jason Clare**	Oz Guney (Lib)	Linda Eisler	Elvis Sinosic	Adam Stepanoff	
Bradfield	Liberal	David Bridgen	**Paul Fletcher** (Lib)	Martin Cousins	Rob Fletcher	Michael Lowe	Nicolette Boele (Ind); Janine Kitson (Ind)
Calare	National	Sarah Elliott	**Andrew Gee** (Nat)	Kay Nankervis	Adam Jannis	Stacey Whittaker	Kate Hook (Ind)
Chifley	Labor	**Ed Husic**	Jugandeep Singh (Lib)	Sujan Selventhiran	Zvetanka Raskov	Amit Batish	Ammar Khan (Ind); Ben Roughley (LDP)
Cook	Liberal	Simon Earle	**Scott Morrison** (Lib)	Catherine Dyson	Jacqueline Guinane	Gaye Cameron	
Cowper	National	Keith McMullen	**Pat Conaghan** (Nat)	Timothy Nott	Joshua Fairhall	Faye Aspiotis	Simon Chaseling (LDP); Caz Heise (Ind)
Cunningham	Labor	Alison Byrnes	Marcus Uren (Lib)	Dylan Green	Ben Britton	Thomas Grogan	Alexis Garnaut-Miller (ACP); Michael Glover (LDP)
Dobell	Labor	**Emma McBride**	Michael Feneley (Lib)	Cath Connor	Dean Mackin	Martin Stevenson	Geoff Barnes (FP); Eliot Metherell (LDP)
Eden-Monaro	Labor	**Kristy McBain**	Jerry Nockles (Lib)	Vivian Harris	Darren Garnon	Boyd Shannon	Greg Butler (Dem); James Holgate (SAP); Maxwell Holmes (LDP); Tori McLennan (IMOP); Andrew Thaler (Ind)
Farrer	Liberal	Darren Cameron	**Sussan Ley** (Lib)	Eli Davern	Julie Ramos	Richard Francis	Paul Britton (SFF); Amanda Duncan-Strelec (Ind); Chris Roworth (LDP)
Fowler	Labor	Kristina Keneally	Courtney Nguyen (Lib)	Avery Howard	Lela Panich	Tony Margos	Dai Le (Ind)
Fowler	Labor	Kristina Keneally	Courtney Nguyen (Lib)	Avery Howard	Lela Panich	Tony Margos	Peter Runge (LDP)
Gilmore	Labor	**Fiona Phillips**	Andrew Constance (Lib)	Carmel McCallum	Jordan Maloney	Jerremy Eid	Nina Digiglio (Ind); Adrian Fadini (LDP)
Grayndler	Labor	**Anthony Albanese**	Ben Zhang (Lib)	Rachael Jacobs	David Smith	Paul Henselin	Michael Dello-Iacovo (AJP); James Haggerty (FP); Sarina Kilham (Ind)
Greenway	Labor	**Michelle Rowland**	Pradeep Pathi (Lib)	Damien Atkins	Mark Rex	Rick Turner	Riccardo Bosi (Ind); Adam Kachwalla (LDP); Love Nanda (Ind)
Hughes	Liberal	Riley Campbell	Jenny Ware (Lib)	Peter Thompson	**Craig Kelly**	Narelle Seymour	Linda Seymour (Ind); Georgia Steele (Ind)
Hume	Liberal	Greg Baines	**Angus Taylor** (Lib)	Karen Stewart	Garry Dollin	Rebecca Thompson	Penny Ackery (Ind); Joaquim de Lima (LDP); Sheneli Meneripitiyage Dona (Ind); Ross Seller (SFF)
Hunter	Labor	Daniel Repacholi	James Thomson (Nat)	Janet Murray	Geoff Passfield	Dale McNamara	Stuart Bonds (Ind); Victoria Davies (AJP); Scott Laruffa (Ind); Cathy Townsend (IMOP)
Kingsford Smith	Labor	**Matt Thistlethwaite**	Grace Tan (Lib)	Stuart Davis	Anthony Tawaf	Darrin Marr	
Lindsay	Liberal	Trevor Ross	**Melissa McIntosh** (Lib)	Pieter Morrsink	Joseph O'Connor	Max Jago	Gareth McClure (LDP); Rebekah Ray (IMOP)
Lyne	National	Alex Simpson	**David Gillespie** (Nat)	Karl Attenborough	Joel Putland	Josephine Cashman	Steve Attkins (Ind); Mark Hornshaw (LDP); Joanne Pearce (Ind)
Macarthur	Labor	**Mike Freelander**	Binod Paudel (Lib)	Jayden Rivera	Rosa Sicari	Adam Zahra	Scott Korman (LDP)
Mackellar	Liberal	Paula Goodman	**Jason Falinski** (Lib)	Ethan Hrnjak	Christopher Ball	Darren Dickson	Sophie Scamps (Ind)
Mackellar	Liberal	Paula Goodman	**Jason Falinski** (Lib)	Ethan Hrnjak	Christopher Ball	Darren Dickson	Barry Steele (TNL)
Macquarie	Labor	**Susan Templeman**	Sarah Richards (Lib)	Tony Hickey	Nicole Evans	Tony Pettitt	Greg Keightley (AJP); James Jackson (LDP); Michelle Palmer (IMOP)
McMahon	Labor	**Chris Bowen**	Vivek Singha (Lib)	Astrid O'Neill	Marie Saliba	Scott Ford	Cameron Shamsabad (LDP)
Mitchell	Liberal	Immanuel Selvaraj	**Alex Hawke** (Lib)	Matt Cox	Linda Daniel	Donald McKenzie	Clinton Mead (LDP)
New England	National	Laura Hughes	**Barnaby Joyce** (Nat)	Carol Sparks	Cindy Duncan	Richard Thomas	Natasha Ledger (Ind); Pavlo Samios (LDP); Matt Sharpham (Ind)
Newcastle	Labor	**Sharon Claydon**	Katrina Wark (Lib)	Charlotte McCabe	Amanda Cook	Mark Watson	Emily Brollo (AJP); William Hussey (IMOP); Garth Pywell (AFP)
North Sydney	Liberal	Catherine Renshaw	**Trent Zimmerman** (Lib)	Heather Armstrong	Robert Nalbandian	Michael Walls	Kylea Tink (Ind)
North Sydney	Liberal	Catherine Renshaw	**Trent Zimmerman** (Lib)	Heather Armstrong	Robert Nalbandian	Michael Walls	William Bourke (SAP); Lesley Kinney (IMOP); Victor Kline (TNL); Dajen Tinkler (LDP)
Page	National	Patrick Deegan	**Kevin Hogan** (Nat)	Kashmir Miller	Ian Williamson	Donna Pike	Brett Duroux (IAPA); Serge Killingbeck (TNL); Hanabeth Luke (Ind); Thomas Searles (LDP); Heather Smith (AFP)
Parkes	National	Jack Ayoub	**Mark Coulton** (Nat)	Trish Frail	Petrus Van Der Steen	Deborah Swinbourn	Benjamin Fox (IMOP); Derek Hardman (IAPA); Stuart Howe (Ind); Peter Rothwell (LDP)
Parramatta	Labor	Andrew Charlton	Maria Kovacic (Lib)	Phil Bradley	Julian Fayad	Heather Freeman	Steve Christou (Ind); Rohan Laxmanalal (AJP); Liza Tazewell (LDP)
Paterson	Labor	**Meryl Swanson**	Brooke Vitnell (Lib)	Louise Ihlein	Jason Olbourne	Neil Turner	Sonia Bailey (LDP); Angela Ketas (IMOP)
Reid	Liberal	Sally Sitou	**Fiona Martin** (Lib)	Charles Jago	Jamal Daoud	Edward Walters	Natalie Baini (Ind); Andrew Cameron (LDP); Sahar Khalili-Naghadeh (FP)
Richmond	Labor	**Justine Elliot**	Kimberly Hone (Nat)	Mandy Nolan	Rob Marks	Tracey Bell-Henselin	Gary Biggs (LDP); Nathan Jones (Ind); Terry Sharples (Ind); Monica Shepherd (IMOP); David Warth (Ind)
Riverina	National	Mark Jeffreson	**Michael McCormack** (Nat)	Michael Organ	Daniel Martelozzo	Richard Orchard	Darren Ciavarella (Ind); Steve Karaitiana (SFF); Dean McCrae (LDP)
Robertson	Liberal	Gordon Reid	**Lucy Wicks** (Lib)	Shelly McGrath	Barbara-Jane Murray	Billy O'Grady	Paul Borthwick (ACP); Alexandra Hafner (AFP); Jeffrey Lawson (IAPA); Bentley Logan (LDP); Kate Mason (IMOP); Patrick Murphy (AJP)
Shortland	Labor	**Pat Conroy**	Nell McGill (Lib)	Kim Grierson	Kenneth Maxwell	Quintin King	Basil Paynter (Ind); Barry Reed (LDP); Bree Roberts (AJP)
Sydney	Labor	**Tanya Plibersek**	Alexander Andruska (Lib)	Chetan Sahai	Ryan McAlister	Ben Ferguson	Andrew Chuter (SA); Wen Zhou (ACP)
Warringah	Independent	David Mickelburgh	Katherine Deves (Lib)	Kristyn Glanville	Andrew Robertson	Steven Tripp	**Zali Steggall** (Ind)
Warringah	Independent	David Mickelburgh	Katherine Deves (Lib)	Kristyn Glanville	Andrew Robertson	Steven Tripp	Kate Paterson (AJP)
Watson	Labor	**Tony Burke**	Sazeda Atker (Lib)	Bradley Schott	John Koukoulis	Alan Jorgensen	
Wentworth	Liberal	Tim Murray	**Dave Sharma** (Lib)	Dominic Wy Kanak	Natalie Dumer	Dean Fisher	Allegra Spender (Ind)
Wentworth	Liberal	Tim Murray	**Dave Sharma** (Lib)	Dominic Wy Kanak	Natalie Dumer	Dean Fisher	Daniel Lewkovitz (LDP)
Werriwa	Labor	**Anne Stanley**	Sam Kayal (Lib)	Apurva Shukla	Tony Nikolic	Adam Booke	Victor Tey (LDP)
Whitlam	Labor	**Stephen Jones**	Michael Cains (Lib)	Jamie Dixon	Allan Wode	Colin Hughes	Michael Wheeler (LDP)

=== Northern Territory ===
Electorate	Held by	Labor	CLP	Greens	UAP	One Nation	LDP	Others
Lingiari	Labor	Marion Scrymgour	Damien Ryan	Blair McFarland	Allan McLeod	Tim Gallard	George Kasparek	Imelda Adamson Agars (Ind); Michael Gravener (Ind); Thong Sum Lee (ACP)
Solomon	Labor	**Luke Gosling**	Tina MacFarlane	Aiya Goodrich Carttling	Tayla Selfe	Emily Lohse	Kylie Bonanni	

=== Queensland ===
Electorate	Held by	Labor	LNP	Greens	UAP	One Nation	Others
Blair	Labor	**Shayne Neumann**	Sam Biggins	Danielle Mutton	Quinton Cunningham	Liz Suduk	Michelle Jaques (LDP); Angela Lowery (AJP); Maria Pitman (AVP)
Bonner	LNP	Tabatha Young	**Ross Vasta**	Bernard Lakey	Serge Diklitch	Amanda Neil	
Bowman	LNP	Donisha Duff	Henry Pike	Ian Mazlin	Mary-Jane Stevens	Walter Todd	Phil Johnson (TNL)
Brisbane	LNP	Madonna Jarrett	**Trevor Evans**	Stephen Bates	Justin Knudson	Trevor Hold	Anthony Bull (LDP); Tiana Kennedy (AJP)
Capricornia	LNP	Russell Robertson	**Michelle Landry**	Mick Jones	Nathan Harding	Kylee Stanton	Paula Ganfield (IMOP); Steve Murphy (LDP); Ken Murray (Ind); Zteven Whitty (GAP)
Dawson	LNP	Shane Hamilton	Andrew Willcox	Paula Creen	Christian Young	Julie Hall	Jim Jackson (GAP); Ciaron Paterson (KAP)
Dickson	LNP	Ali France	**Peter Dutton**	Vinnie Batten	Alina Ward	Tamera Gibson	Alan Buchbach (Ind); Thor Prohaska (Ind); Lloyd Russell (LDP)
Fadden	LNP	Letitia Del Fabbro	**Stuart Robert**	Sally Spain	Nathan O'Brien	Sandy Roach	Stewart Brooker (Ind); Alex Forbes (LDP)
Fairfax	LNP	Sue Ferguson	**Ted O'Brien**	Sue Etheridge	Lisa Khoury	Nikki Civitarese	Sinim Australie (Ind); Wendy Hazelton (IMOP); Tash Poole (AJP); Barry Smith (Ind); Craig White (GAP)
Fisher	LNP	Judene Andrews	**Andrew Wallace**	Renay Wells	Tony Moore	Sam Schriever	Vickie Breckenridge (AJP)
Flynn	LNP	Matt Burnett	Colin Boyce	Paul Bambrick	Tanya Wieden	Sharon Lohse	Duncan Scott (Ind); Carla Svendsen (GAP)
Forde	LNP	Rowan Holzberger	**Bert van Manen**	Jordan Hall	Roxanne O'Halloran	Seschelle Matterson	Christopher Greaves (Ind); Samuel Holland (TNL); Linda McCarthy (AJP) (disendorsed); Tobby Sutherland (LDP)
Griffith	Labor	**Terri Butler**	Olivia Roberts	Max Chandler-Mather	Robert McMullan	Shari Ware	
Groom	LNP	Gen Allpass	**Garth Hamilton**	Mickey Berry	Melissa Bannister	Grant Abraham	Suzie Holt (Ind); Ryan Otto (AFP); Kirstie Smolenski (Ind)
Herbert	LNP	John Ring	**Phillip Thompson**	Scott Humphreys	Greg Dowling	Diane Pepe	Larna Ballard (GAP); Steven Clare (Ind); Angela Egan (Ind); Clynton Hawks (KAP); Toni McCormack (AJP); Toni McMahon (IMOP)
Hinkler	LNP	Jason Scanes	**Keith Pitt**	Andrew McLean	Kristie Nash	Zak Menhennett	Jack Dempsey (Ind)
Kennedy	KAP	Jason Brandon	Bryce Macdonald	Jennifer Cox	Peter Campion		**Bob Katter** (KAP)
Kennedy	KAP	Jason Brandon	Bryce Macdonald	Jennifer Cox	Peter Campion		Jen Sackley (Ind)
Leichhardt	LNP	Elida Faith	**Warren Entsch**	Phillip Musumeci	Daniel Hannagan	Geena Court	Susanne Bayly (AJP); Adam Cropp (FP); Rod Jensen (KAP); Silvia Mogorovich (IMOP); Pat O'Shane (SA); Paul Roe (AFP)
Lilley	Labor	**Anika Wells**	Vivian Lobo	Melissa Stevens	Gerardine Hoogland	Michelle Wilde	Daniel Freshwater (LDP); Stephen McGrath (IMOP)
Longman	LNP	Rebecca Fanning	**Terry Young**	Earl Snijders	Stefanie Sutherland	Ross Taylor	Paula Gilbard (AJP); Jens Lipponer (LDP); Nigel Quinlan (LCA)
Maranoa	LNP	Dave Kerrigan	**David Littleproud**	Ellisa Parker	Nathan McDonald	Mike Kelly	Malcolm Richardson (SFF); Brett Tunbridge (AFP)
McPherson	LNP	Carl Ungerer	**Karen Andrews**	Scott Turner	Joshua Berrigan	Kevin Hargraves	Andy Cullen (AVP); Gary Pead (AFP); Glenn Pyne (LDP)
Moncrieff	LNP	Glen Palmer	**Angie Bell**	April Broadbent	Diane Happ	Leeanne Schultz	Sonia Berry-Law (AJP); Timothy Cudmore (IMOP); Diane Demetre (LDP); James Tayler (AFP)
Moreton	Labor	**Graham Perrett**	Steven Huang	Claire Garton	Chelsea Follett	Neil Swann	Peter Power (AFP)
Oxley	Labor	**Milton Dick**	Kyle McMillen	Asha Worsteling	Timothy Coombes	Dylan Kozlowski	
Petrie	LNP	Mick Denton	**Luke Howarth**	Will Simon	Kelly Guenoun	Marcus Mitchell	Chris Cicchitti (AJP); Anneke Wilson (LDP)
Rankin	Labor	**Jim Chalmers**	Paul Darwen	Neil Cotter	Jeff Crank	Glen Cookson	Suzanne Clarke (AJP) (disendorsed)
Ryan	LNP	Peter Cossar	**Julian Simmonds**	Elizabeth Watson-Brown	Kathryn Pollard	Joel Love	Damian Coory (LDP); Axel Dancoisne (AFP); Jina Lipman (AJP); Janine Rees (Prog)
Wide Bay	LNP	Geoff Williams	**Llew O'Brien**	Craig Armstrong	Tracy Bennett	Nathan Buckley	Kelli Jacobi (Ind); Tim Jerome (Ind); Andrea Newland (IMOP); Daniel Williams (AVP); John Woodward (AFP)
Wright	LNP	Pam McCreadie	**Scott Buchholz**	Nicole Thompson	Cassandra Duffill	Keith Hicks	Shonna-Lee Banasiak (AFP)

=== South Australia ===
Electorate	Held by	Labor	Liberal	Greens	UAP	One Nation	Others
Adelaide	Labor	**Steve Georganas**	Amy Grantham	Rebecca Galdies	Sean Allwood	Gayle Allwood	Faith Gerhard (AFP); Matthew McMillan (FP)
Barker	Liberal	Mark Braes	**Tony Pasin**	Rosa Hillam	David Swiggs	Carlos Quaremba	Maddy Fry (Ind); Kym Hanton (AFP); Vince Pannell (Ind); Jonathan Pietzsch (Nat)
Boothby	Liberal	Louise Miller-Frost	Rachel Swift	Jeremy Carter	Graeme Clark	Bob Couch	Frankie Bray (AJP); Paul Busuttil (Ind); Jo Dyer (Ind); Peter Harris (AFP); Aleksandra Nikolic (LDP)
Grey	Liberal	Julie Watson	**Rowan Ramsey**	Tim White	Suzanne Waters	Kerry White	Richard Carmody (Ind); Tracey Dempsey (AFP); Liz Habermann (Ind); Peter Miller (LDP)
Hindmarsh	Labor	**Mark Butler**	Anna Finizio	Patrick O'Sullivan	George Melissourgos	Walter Johnson	Matt Pastro (AJP); Dianne Richards (AFP); Jamie Witt (GAP)
Kingston	Labor	**Amanda Rishworth**	Kathleen Bourne	John Photakis	Russell Jackson	Robert Godfrey-Brown	Rob De Jonge (Ind); Sam Enright (AFP)
Makin	Labor	**Tony Zappia**	Alan Howard-Jones	Emma Mustaca	Kimberley Drozdoff	Rajan Vaid	Abram Lazootin (AFP)
Mayo	Centre; Alliance	Marisa Bell	Allison Bluck	Greg Elliott	Samantha McGrail	Tonya Scott	**Rebekha Sharkie** (CA)
Mayo	Centre; Alliance	Marisa Bell	Allison Bluck	Greg Elliott	Samantha McGrail	Tonya Scott	Padma Chaplin (AJP); Mark Neugebauer (AFP); Jacob van Raalte (LDP)
Spence	Labor	Matt Burnell	Shawn Lock	David Deex	Alvin Warren	Linda Champion	Matilda Bawden (AFP)
Sturt	Liberal	Sonja Baram	**James Stevens**	Katie McCusker	Stephen Grant	Alexander Allwood	Inty Elham (DPDA); Angela Fulco (Prog); Thomas McMahon (LDP); Kathy Scarborough (AFP); Chris Schmidt (TNL); David Sherlock (AJP)

=== Tasmania ===
Electorate	Held by	Labor	Liberal	Greens	UAP	JLN	One Nation	Others
Bass	Liberal	Ross Hart	**Bridget Archer**	Cecily Rosol	Kyle Squibb	Bob Salt	Melanie Davy	Alison Baker (AJP); Stephen Humble (LDP); George Razay (Ind)
Braddon	Liberal	Chris Lynch	**Gavin Pearce**	Darren Briggs	Darren Bobbermien	Sophie Lehmann	Ludo Mineur	Craig Garland (Ind); Keone Martin (AJP); Scott Rankin (Loc); Duncan White (LDP)
Clark	Independent	Simon Davis	Will Coats	Janet Shelley	Sandra Galloway		Michelle Cameron	**Andrew Wilkie** (Ind)
Clark	Independent	Simon Davis	Will Coats	Janet Shelley	Sandra Galloway		Michelle Cameron	Casey Davies (AJP); Ian Ramsden (LDP)
Franklin	Labor	**Julie Collins**	Kristy Johnson	Jade Darko	Lisa Matthews	Chris Hannan	Steve Hindley	Anna Bateman (Loc); Katrina Love (AJP); Duane Pitt (LDP)
Lyons	Labor	**Brian Mitchell**	Susie Bower	Liz Johnstone	Jason Evans	Troy Pfitzner	Emma Goyne	Anna Gralton (AJP); Rhys Griffiths (LDP)

=== Victoria ===
Electorate	Held by	Labor	Coalition	Greens	UAP	One Nation	Others
Aston	Liberal	Mary Doyle	**Alan Tudge** (Lib)	Asher Cookson	Rebekah Spelman	Craig Ibbotson	Ryan Bruce (TNL); Liam Roche (LDP)
Ballarat	Labor	**Catherine King**	Ben Green (Lib)	John Barnes	Terri Pryse-Smith	Rosalie Taxis	Alex Graham (Ind); Julia McGrath (LDP); Kerryn Sedgman (AFP)
Bendigo	Labor	**Lisa Chesters**	Darin Schade (Lib)	Cate Sinclair	Elijah Suares	Ben Mihail	Matt Bansemer (LDP); James Laurie (Ind)
Bruce	Labor	**Julian Hill**	James Moody (Lib)	Matthew Kirwan	Matt Babet	Hayley Deans	Christine Skrobo (LDP)
Calwell	Labor	**Maria Vamvakinou**	Tim Staker-Gunn (Lib)	Natalie Abboud	Joshua Naim	Mark Preston	Maria Bengtsson (AFP); Jerome Small (VS)
Casey	Liberal	Bill Brindle	Aaron Violi (Lib)	Jenny Game	Anthony Bellve	Paul Murphy	Craig Cole (Ind); Claire Ferres Miles (Ind); Chris Field (AFP); Andrew Klop (AJP); Trevor Smith (LDP); Peter Sullivan (DHJP)
Chisholm	Liberal	Carina Garland	**Gladys Liu** (Lib)	Sarah Newman	Melanie Kempson	Aaron Tyrrell	Anthea Antonie (AFP); Ryan Dare (ACP); Ethelyn King (LDP); Dominique Murphy (Ind); Thomas Stanfield (DHJP); Wayne Tseng (Ind); Rod Whitfield (AJP)
Cooper	Labor	**Ged Kearney**	Jadon Atkinson (Lib)	Celeste Liddle	Adam La Rosa	William Turner	Rabin Bangaar (AJP); Kath Larkin (VS); Adrian Whitehead (FP)
Corangamite	Labor	**Libby Coker**	Stephanie Asher (Lib)	Alex Marshall	Daniel Abou-Zeid	Luke Sorensen	Paul Barker (LDP); Jean-Marie d'Argent (DHJP); Stephen Juhasz (AFP); Meg Watkins (AJP)
Corio	Labor	**Richard Marles**	Manish Patel (Lib)	Simon Northeast	Shane Murdock	Robert Jones	Naomi Adams (AJP); Sue Bull (SA); Max Payne (LDP); Jessica Taylor (AFP)
Deakin	Liberal	Matt Gregg	**Michael Sukkar** (Lib)	Rob Humphreys	Bianca Gidley	Natasha Coughlan	Samantha Bastin (AFP); Harrison Carr (LDP); Katherine Dolheguy (AJP); Qian Liu (Ind); Judith Thompson (DHJP)
Dunkley	Labor	**Peta Murphy**	Sharn Coombes (Lib)	Liam O'Brien	Adrian Irvine	Scott Middlebrook	Darren Bergwerf (Ind); Elizabeth Johnston (AJP); Damian Willis (LDP); Kathryn Woods (AFP)
Flinders	Liberal	Surbhi Snowball	Zoe McKenzie (Lib)	Colin Lane	Alex van der End	Cyndi Marr	Chrysten Abraham (LDP); Jefferson Earl (AFP); Pamela Engelander (AJP); Despi O'Connor (Ind); Sarah Russell (Ind)
Fraser	Labor	**Daniel Mulino**	David Wood (Lib)	Bella Mitchell-Sears	Keith Raymond	Sabine De Pyle	Anthony Cursio (LDP); Catherine Robertson (VS)
Gellibrand	Labor	**Tim Watts**	Monica Clark (Lib)	Suzette Rodoreda	Abraham Isac	Rob Braddock	Andrew Charles (VS); Chloe Glasson (LDP); Sharynn Moors (AFP)
Gippsland	National	Jannette Langley	**Darren Chester** (Nat)	Marjorie Thorpe	Gregory Forster	Greg Hansford	Jim McDonald (LDP)
Goldstein	Liberal	Martyn Abbott	**Tim Wilson** (Lib)	Alana Galli-McRostie	Catherine Reynolds	Lisa Stark	Zoe Daniel (Ind)
Goldstein	Liberal	Martyn Abbott	**Tim Wilson** (Lib)	Alana Galli-McRostie	Catherine Reynolds	Lisa Stark	Brandon Hoult (SAP); David Segal (LDP); Ellie Sullivan (DHJP)
Gorton	Labor	**Brendan O'Connor**	John Fletcher (Lib)	Praise Morris	Michael Virag	Daniel Connor	Tony Dobran (GAP); Belle Gibson (VS); Paul Lassig (AFP); Steven Loncar (Ind)
Hawke	Labor (notional) (Note: Hawke is a new seat that will be contested for the first time at this election. Electoral analyst Antony Green has estimated that the Labor Party would have won the seat by 10.2% at the 2019 election.)	Sam Rae	Enamul Haque (Lib)	Lynda Wheelock	Andrew Cuthbertson	Nick Suduk	Jarrod Bingham (Ind); Jack Hynes (VS); Michael Lacey (GAP); Max Martucci (TNL); Glenn Vessey (ACP); Michael Williams (AFP)
Higgins	Liberal	Michelle Ananda-Rajah	**Katie Allen** (Lib)	Sonya Semmens	Ingram Spencer		Matthew Ford (LDP); Andrew Johnson (RP); Suzie Menoudakis (AFP); Alicia Walker (AJP)
Holt	Labor	Cassandra Fernando	Ranj Perera (Lib)	Sujit Mathew	Gerardine Hansen	Sandy Ambard	Matthew Nunez-Silva (LDP); Ravi Ragupathy (Ind); Gregory Saldanha (AFP)
Hotham	Labor	**Clare O'Neil**	Savitri Bevinakoppa (Lib)	Louisa Willoughby	Bruce Ridgway	Roger Tull	Edward Sok (LDP)
Indi	Independent	Nadia David	Liz Fisher (Nat); Ross Lyman (Lib)	Benjamin Gilbert	Stephen Williams	Beth Stevens	**Helen Haines** (Ind)
Indi	Independent	Nadia David	Liz Fisher (Nat); Ross Lyman (Lib)	Benjamin Gilbert	Stephen Williams	Beth Stevens	Angel Aleksov (AJP); Julian Fidge (LDP); Lachlan O'Connell (DHJP)
Isaacs	Labor	**Mark Dreyfus**	Robbie Beaton (Lib)	Alex Breskin	Scott McCamish	Boris Sokiransky	Alix Livingstone (AJP); Sarah O'Donnell (LDP)
Jagajaga	Labor	**Kate Thwaites**	Sahil Tomar (Lib)	Liz Chase	Allison Zelinka	John Booker	Zahra Mustaf (Ind); Brendan Palmarini (AFP); Maya Tesa (LDP)
Kooyong	Liberal	Peter Lynch	**Josh Frydenberg** (Lib)	Piers Mitchem	Scott Hardiman	Josh Coyne	Monique Ryan (Ind)
Kooyong	Liberal	Peter Lynch	**Josh Frydenberg** (Lib)	Piers Mitchem	Scott Hardiman	Josh Coyne	Will Anderson (Ind); David Connolly (AVP); Michele Dale (DHJP); Rachael Nehmer (AJP); Alexandra Thom (LDP)
La Trobe	Liberal	Abi Kumar	**Jason Wood** (Lib)	Michael Schilling	Merryn Mott	Hadden Ervin	Michael Abelman (LDP); Helen Jeges (AJP); Rebecca Skinner (AFP)
Lalor	Labor	**Joanne Ryan**	Ravi Gaddipati (Lib)	Jack Boddeke	Juanita Paterson	James Ingarfill	Patrizia Barcatta (LDP); Peter Malliaros (AFP); Aijaz Moinuddin (Ind); Claudio Uribe (VS)
Macnamara	Labor	**Josh Burns**	Colleen Harkin (Lib)	Steph Hodgins-May	Jane Hickey	Debera Anne	Rob McCathie (LDP); John Myers (Ind); Ben Schultz (AJP)
Mallee	National	Carole Hart	**Anne Webster** (Nat)	Sam McColl	Stuart King	Vanessa Atkinson	Sophie Baldwin (Ind); Claudia Haenel (Ind); Chris Lahy (ACP)
Maribyrnong	Labor	**Bill Shorten**	Mira D'Silva (Lib)	Rhonda Pryor	Darren Besanko	Jodie Tindal	Alexander Ansalone (AFP); Daniel Dadich (VS); Mark Hobart (GAP); Cameron Smith (LDP)
McEwen	Labor	**Rob Mitchell**	Richard Welch (Lib)	Neil Barker	Paul McRae	Chris Bradbury	John Herron (LDP); Christopher Neil (AFP)
Melbourne	Greens	Keir Paterson	James Damches (Lib)	**Adam Bandt**	Justin Borg	Walter Stragan	Colleen Bolger (VS); Richard Peppard (LDP); Bruce Poon (AJP); Scott Robson (Ind)
Menzies	Liberal	Naomi Oakley	Keith Wolahan (Lib)	Bill Pheasant	Nathan Scaglione	John Hayes	Greg Cheesman (LDP); Sanjeev Sabhlok (AFP)
Monash	Liberal	Jessica O'Donnell	**Russell Broadbent** (Lib)	Mat Morgan	Christine McShane	Allan Hicken	Meg Edwards (LDP); Deb Leonard (Ind); David Welsh (AFP)
Nicholls	National	Bill Lodwick	Sam Birrell (Nat)	Ian Christoe	Robert Peterson	Rikkie-Lee Tyrrell	Jeff Davy (ACP); Tim Laird (LDP); Andrea Otto (FP); Rob Priestly (Ind); Eleonor Tabone (AFP)
Nicholls	National	Bill Lodwick	Steve Brooks (Lib)	Ian Christoe	Robert Peterson	Rikkie-Lee Tyrrell	Jeff Davy (ACP); Tim Laird (LDP); Andrea Otto (FP); Rob Priestly (Ind); Eleonor Tabone (AFP)
Scullin	Labor	**Andrew Giles**	Virosh Perera (Lib)	Patchouli Paterson	Yassin Albarri	Ursula van Bree	Eric Koelmeyer (LDP); Cameron Rowe (VS)
Wannon	Liberal	Gilbert Wilson	**Dan Tehan** (Lib)	Hilary McAllister	Craige Kensen	Ronnie Graham	Alex Dyson (Ind); Graham Garner (Ind); Amanda Mead (LDP)
Wills	Labor	**Peter Khalil**	Tom Wright (Lib)	Sarah Jefford	Irene Zivkovic	Jill Tindal	Emma Black (VS); Sue Bolton (SA); Leah Horsfall (AJP); Sam Sergi (AFP)

=== Western Australia ===
Electorate	Held by	Labor	Liberal	Greens	UAP	One Nation	Others
Brand	Labor	**Madeleine King**	Peter Hudson	Heather Lonsdale	David Pike	Jake Taylor	Jayne Crichton (AC); Andrew Gleeson (GAP); Malcolm Heffernan (AFP) (Note: Heffernan was both the One Nation candidate for the NSW division of Banks, and the Australian Federation Party candidate for the WA division of Brand. This led to him being referred to the Australian Federal Police as it is illegal to stand in multiple electorates simultaneously.); Alison Marshall (LDP); Michael O'Loghlen (WAP)
Burt	Labor	**Matt Keogh**	David Goode	Daniel Garlett	Joshua McCurry	Travis Carter	Michele Castle (AFP); Stephen Phelan (WAP); Warnar Spyker (AC)
Canning	Liberal	Amanda Hunt	**Andrew Hastie**	Jodie Moffat	James Waldeck	Tammi Siwes	Brad Bedford (WAP); Judith Congrene (IMOP); Andriette du Plessis (AC); David Gardiner (LDP); Anthony Gardyne (AFP); Ashley Williams (Ind)
Cowan	Labor	**Anne Aly**	**Vince Connelly**	Isabella Tripp	Claire Hand	Tyler Walsh	Michael Anagno (AJP); Michael Calautti (AFP); Sylvia Iradukunda (AC); Roland Laverack (WAP); Micah van Krieken (LDP)
Curtin	Liberal	Yannick Spencer	**Celia Hammond**	Cameron Pidgeon	Ladeisha Verhoeff	Dale Grillo	Kate Chaney (Ind)
Curtin	Liberal	Yannick Spencer	**Celia Hammond**	Cameron Pidgeon	Ladeisha Verhoeff	Dale Grillo	Bill Burn (WAP); Judith Cullity (AFP)
Durack	Liberal	Jeremiah Riley	**Melissa Price**	Bianca McNeair	Andrew Middleton	Brenton Johannsen	Ian Blayney (Nat); Anthony Fels (WAP); Adrian McRae (GAP); Craig Shore (AFP)
Forrest	Liberal	Bronwen English	**Nola Marino**	Christine Terrantroy	Helen Allan	Shane Mezger	Tracy Aitken (GAP); Mailee Dunn (AFP); Paul Markham (LDP); Greg Stephens (WAP)
Fremantle	Labor	**Josh Wilson**	Bill Koul	Felicity Townsend	Stella Jinman	William Edgar	Cathy Gavranich (AFP); Janetia Knapp (WAP); Yan Loh (LDP); Ben Tilbury (GAP); Sam Wainwright (SA)
Hasluck	Liberal	Tania Lawrence	**Ken Wyatt**	Brendan Sturcke	Will Scott	Ian Monck	Pauline Clark (WAP); Steven McCreanor (LDP); Marijanna Smith (AFP); Jeanene Williams (Ind)
Moore	Liberal	Tom French	**Ian Goodenough**	Mark Cooper	Helen Watkinson	Brian Brightman	Sue Andersson (GAP); Peter Gunness (WAP); Martin Suter (AFP)
O'Connor	Liberal	Shaneane Weldon	**Rick Wilson**	Giz Watson	Tracy Tirronen	Stan Kustrin	Brenden Barber (GAP); Morris Bessant (WAP); Isaac Middle (AFP); Justin Moseley (AC)
Pearce	Liberal	Tracey Roberts	Linda Aitken	Donna Nelson	Trevor Dalby	Aaron Malloy	Nigel March (AFP); David Marshall (LDP); Vanessa Montgomery (AC); Jim Paice (WAP); Roslyn Stewart (GAP)
Perth	Labor	**Patrick Gorman**	David Dwyer	Caroline Perks	Sonya Eberhart	Cameron Bailey	Sean Connor (GAP); Aiden Gyuru (AFP); Evan Nickols (LDP); Dean Powell (AC); Sarah Szmekura-Moor (AJP); Dave Vos (WAP)
Swan	Liberal	Zaneta Mascarenhas	Kristy McSweeney	Clint Uink	Paul Hilton	Peter Hallifax	Rod Bradley (WAP); Dena Gower (AC); Timothy Green (AJP); Carl Pallier (AFP); Matthew Thompson (LDP)
Tangney	Liberal	Sam Lim	**Ben Morton**	Adam Abdul Razak	Travis Mark	Tshung-Hui Chang	Brent Fowler (AFP); Jay Gillett (WAP); Jacqueline Holroyd (LDP); Mark Staer (AC)

== Senate ==
In an ordinary half-Senate election, 40 of the 76 Senate seats will be up for election, six (out of twelve) in each state and all four territory seats. Successful candidates are marked with an asterisk from the highlighted list.

=== Australian Capital Territory ===
Two seats were up for election. The Labor Party was defending one seat. The Liberal Party was defending one seat.

Labor	Liberal	Greens	Kim for Canberra	David Pocock
1. Katy Gallagher*; 2. Maddy Northam	1. Zed Seselja; 2. Kacey Lam	1. Tjanara Goreng Goreng; 2. James Cruz	1. Kim Rubenstein; 2. Kim Huynh	1. David Pocock*; 2. Clare Doube
Animal Justice	Progressives	Medical Options	United Australia	Sustainable Australia
1. Yana del Valle; 2. Jannah Fahiz	1. Therese Faulkner; 2. Stephen Lin	1. Michael Simms; 2. Mary-Jane Liddicoat	1. James Savoulidis; 2. Tracey Page	1. Joy Angel; 2. John Haydon
Legalise Cannabis	Ungrouped			
1. Michael Katelaris; 2. Michelle Stanvic	Fuxin Li			

=== New South Wales ===
Six seats were up for election. The Labor Party was defending three seats. The Liberal-National Coalition was defending three seats. Senators Tim Ayres (Labor), Andrew Bragg (Liberal), Perin Davey (National), Mehreen Faruqi (Greens), Hollie Hughes (Liberal) and Tony Sheldon (Labor) were not up for re-election.

Labor	Coalition	Greens	United Australia	TNL
1. Deborah O'Neill*; 2. Jenny McAllister*; 3. Shireen Morris; 4. Mich-Elle Myers; 5. Kylie Rose; 6. James Warren-Smith	1. Marise Payne* (Lib); 2. Ross Cadell* (Nat); 3. Jim Molan* (Lib); 4. Alison Penfold (Nat); 5. Mary-Lou Jarvis (Lib); 6. Vicky McGahey (Lib)	1. David Shoebridge*; 2. Amanda Cohn; 3. Rochelle Flood; 4. Jane Scott; 5. Hawa Arya; 6. Danielle Wheeler	1. Domenic Martino; 2. Suellen Wrightson; 3. Wayne Moore; 4. Michelle Martin; 5. Johnny Yap; 6. Kevin Loughrey	1. Steve Keen; 2. Melissa Green
Great Australia	Reason	Animal Justice	Liberal Democrats	Indigenous-Aboriginal
1. Matthew Hopkins; 2. George Nohra	1. Jane Caro; 2. Hannah Maher; 3. Diana Ryall	1. Darren Brollo; 2. Julie Power	1. John Ruddick; 2. John Larter; 3. James Cadwell; 4. Mark Guest	1. Owen Whyman; 2. Lawrence Brooke
Socialist Alliance	Australian Democrats	Australian Values	Citizens	Fusion
1. Paula Sanchez; 2. Niko Leka; 3. Rachel Evans	1. Steve Baty; 2. Suzanne Rogers; 3. Craig Richards	1. Selena Clancy; 2. Dave Gilbert	1. Kingsley Liu; 2. Ann Lawler	1. Andrea Leong; 2. Ian Bryce
Medical Options	Federal ICAC	Sustainable Australia	One Nation	Legalise Cannabis
1. Michael O'Neill; 2. Marelle Burnum Burnum	1. Ross Jones; 2. Gabrielle Anderson	1. Georgia Lamb; 2. Suzanne De Vive	1. Kate McCulloch; 2. Colin Grigg; 3. Roger Smith	1. Michael Balderstone; 2. Gail Hester
Seniors United	Shooters, Fishers and Farmers	Group F (Note: Candidates in this group were endorsed by the Socialist Equality Party, which lost registered party status but still ran candidates as independents.)	Ungrouped	
1. Dessie Kocher; 2. Ray Bennie	1. Shane Djuric; 2. Desiree Gregory; 3. Brian Milgate; 4. Jeremy Crooks	1. Max Boddy; 2. Oscar Grenfell	Danny Lim; Julie Collins; Warren Grzic; Guitang Lu; William Laing	

=== Northern Territory ===
Two seats were up for election. The Labor Party was defending one seat. The Country Liberal Party was defending one seat, although sitting senator Sam McMahon left the party and joined the Liberal Democratic Party.

Labor	Country Liberal	Greens	Citizens	Liberal Democrats
1. Malarndirri McCarthy*; 2. Kate Ganley	1. Jacinta Price*; 2. Kris Civitarese	1. Jane Anlezark; 2. Dianne Stokes	1. Trudy Campbell; 2. Peter Flynn	1. Sam McMahon; 2. Jed Hansen
Great Australian	Legalise Cannabis	Sustainable Australia	Ungrouped	
1. Steve Arrigo; 2. Angela Marcus	1. Lance Lawrence; 2. Kelly-Anne Hibbert	1. Lamaan Whyte; 2. Richard Belcher	Raj Rajwin Samson (UAP)	

=== Queensland ===
Six seats were up for election. The Labor Party was defending two seats. The Liberal National Party was defending three seats. One Nation was defending one seat. Senators Nita Green (Labor), Susan McDonald (Liberal National), Gerard Rennick (Liberal National), Malcolm Roberts (One Nation), Paul Scarr (Liberal National) and Larissa Waters (Greens) were not up for re-election.

Labor	Liberal National	Greens	One Nation	TNL
1. Murray Watt*; 2. Anthony Chisholm*; 3. Edwina Andrew; 4. Christina Warry; 5. Jen Henderson; 6. Richard Pascoe	1. James McGrath*; 2. Matt Canavan*; 3. Amanda Stoker; 4. Nicole Tobin; 5. Andrew Cripps; 6. Fiona Ward	1. Penny Allman-Payne*; 2. Anna Sri; 3. Ben Pennings; 4. Navdeep Singh Sidhu; 5. Alyce Nelligan; 6. Rebecca Haley	1. Pauline Hanson*; 2. Raj Guruswamy; 3. George Christensen	1. Bess Brennan; 2. Hannah Kennish; 3. Steven Hopley; 4. Jonathon Momsen; 5. Lloyd Ingram; 6. Jack Creighton
Great Australia	Liberal Democrats	Animal Justice	Democratic Alliance	Socialist Alliance
1. Jason Miles; 2. Elise Cottam	1. Campbell Newman; 2. Tegan Grainger	1. Mackenzie Severns; 2. Sue Weber	1. Drew Pavlou; 2. Simon Leitch	1. Renee Lees; 2. Kamala Emanuel
United Australia	Reason	Citizens	Fusion	Medical Options
1. Clive Palmer; 2. Martin Brewster; 3. Desmond Adidi; 4. Jack McCabe	1. Ron Williams; 2. Frank Jordan	1. Jan Pukallus; 2. Rod Doel	1. Brandon Selic; 2. Roger Whatling	1. Allona Lahn; 2. Jasmine Melhop; 3. Peter Lambeth
Indigenous-Aboriginal	Federal ICAC	Australian Values	Sustainable Australia	Australian Democrats
1. Lionel Henaway; 2. Jenny-Lee Carr	1. Kerin Payne; 2. Ken Carroll	1. Heston Russell; 2. Jay Hansen	1. Rhett Martin; 2. Timotheos Firestone	1. Luke Arbuckle; 2. Chris Simpson
Federation	Legalise Cannabis	Group A	Group H	Group I
1. Isabel Tilyard; 2. Jackie Bennett; 3. Michael Smyth	1. Bernard Bradley; 2. Suzette Luyken	1. Len Harris; 2. Debra Yuille	1. Steve Dickson; 2. Rebecca Lloyd	1. Mike Head; 2. John Davis
Ungrouped
Robert Lyon (KAP); David Schefe; Lindsay Temple; Chey Hamilton	Lorraine Smith; Laurence Quinlivan; Karakan Kochardy; Peter Rogers			

=== South Australia ===
Six seats were up for election. The Labor Party was defending two seats. The Liberal Party was defending two seats. The Centre Alliance had two of their seats up for re-election, although sitting senator Rex Patrick left the party and contested instead for the Rex Patrick Team, whilst senator Stirling Griff ran as the second Independent on the Nick Xenophon group ticket. Senators Alex Antic (Liberal), David Fawcett (Liberal), Karen Grogan (Labor), Sarah Hanson-Young (Greens), Anne Ruston (Liberal) and Marielle Smith (Labor) were not up for re-election.

Labor	Liberal	Greens	Group O	Rex Patrick
1. Penny Wong*; 2. Don Farrell*; 3. Trimann Gill; 4. Joanne Sutton; 5. Belinda Owens	1. Simon Birmingham*; 2. Andrew McLachlan*; 3. Kerrynne Liddle*; 4. Tania Stock	1. Barbara Pocock*; 2. Major Sumner; 3. Melanie Selwood	1. Nick Xenophon; 2. Stirling Griff	1. Rex Patrick; 2. Leonie McMahon
United Australia	Democratic Alliance	Animal Justice	One Nation	Liberal Democrats
1. Michael Arbon; 2. Caelum Schild	1. Adila Yarmuhammad; 2. Amina Yarmuhammad	1. Louise Pfeiffer; 2. Julie Pastro	1. Jennifer Game; 2. Alan Watchman	1. Ian Markos; 2. Josh Smith
Citizens	Fusion	Medical Options	Sustainable Australia	Local Party
1. Russell Francis; 2. Rodney Currey	1. Drew Wolfendale; 2. David Kennedy	1. Raina Cruise; 2. Heather Harley	1. Elise Michie; 2. Jack Duxbury	1. Julie-Ann Finney; 2. Rodney Parnell
Democrats	Federation	Legalise Cannabis	Nationals	Great Australian
1. Roger Yazbek; 2. Sandra Kanck	1. Cathy Byrne; 2. Nick Duffield	1. Tyler Green; 2. Angela Adams	1. Lisa Blandford; 2. Damien Buijs	1. Jo-Anne Eason; 2. Trevor Bennett
Group E (Note: Candidates in this group were endorsed by the unregistered Australian Family Party)	Group M	Ungrouped		
1. Bob Day; 2. Pat Amadio	1. Harmeet Kaur; 2. Rajesh Kumar	Michael Hopper		

=== Tasmania ===
Six seats were up for election. The Labor Party was defending two seats. The Liberal Party was defending three seats. The Greens was defending one seat. Senators Catryna Bilyk (Labor), Carol Brown (Labor), Claire Chandler (Liberal), Richard Colbeck (Liberal), Jacqui Lambie (JLN) and Nick McKim (Greens) were not up for re-election.

Labor	Liberal	Greens	Lambie Network	United Australia
1. Anne Urquhart*; 2. Helen Polley*; 3. Kate Rainbird; 4. Daniel Hulme; 5. Wayne Roberts; 6. Chris Gourlay	1. Jonathon Duniam*; 2. Wendy Askew*; 3. Eric Abetz	1. Peter Whish-Wilson*; 2. Vanessa Bleyer; 3. Tabatha Badger	1. Tammy Tyrrell*; 2. Sarah Groat; 3. Tom Lambie	1. Diana Adams; 2. Alan Hennessy
One Nation	Local Party	Animal Justice	Medical Options	Liberal Democrats
1. Steve Mav; 2. Norelle Button	1. Leanne Minshull; 2. Linda Poulton; 3. Lara Van Raay	1. Ivan Davis; 2. Virginia Thomas-Wurth	1. Lynne Kershaw; 2. Matthew Pickering	1. Topher Field; 2. Chris Croft
Sustainable Australia	Legalise Cannabis	Shooters, Fishers and Farmers	Federation	Ungrouped
1. Todd Dudley; 2. Daria Lockwood	1. Matt Owen; 2. Oliver Fitzgibbion	1. Ray Williams; 2. Carlo Di Falco; 3. Brenton Jones	1. Ray Broomhall; 2. Justin Stringer	Steve Crothers; Fenella Edwards

=== Victoria ===
Six seats were up for election. The Labor Party was defending two seats. The Liberal-National Coalition was defending three seats. The Greens was defending one seat. Senators Raff Ciccone (Labor), Jane Hume (Liberal), James Paterson (Liberal), Janet Rice (Greens), David Van (Liberal) and Jess Walsh (Labor) were not up for re-election.

Labor	Coalition	Greens	One Nation	Justice
1. Linda White*; 2. Jana Stewart*; 3. Casey Nunn; 4. Megan Bridger-Darling; 5. Josh McFarlane	1. Sarah Henderson* (Lib); 2. Bridget McKenzie* (Nat); 3. Greg Mirabella (Lib); 4. Chrestyna Kmetj (Lib); 5. Mick Harrington (Nat); 6. David Burgess (Lib)	1. Lidia Thorpe*; 2. Adam Frogley; 3. Sissy Austin; 4. Zeb Payne	1. Warren Pickering; 2. Stuart Huxham	1. Derryn Hinch; 2. Ruth Stanfield
Vic. Socialists	Animal Justice	Great Australian	Liberal Democrats	United Australia
1. Aran Mylvaganam; 2. Laura Riccardi	1. Bronwyn Currie; 2. Chris Delforce	1. Darryl O'Bryan; 2. Geoff Whitehead	1. David Limbrick; 2. Krystle Mitchell; 3. Caroline White	1. Ralph Babet*; 2. Kelly Moran; 3. Kenneth Grimmond
Citizens	Fusion	Reason	Socialist Alliance	Australian Values
1. Robbie Barwick; 2. Craig Isherwood	1. Kammy Cordner Hunt; 2. Tahlia Farrant	1. Yolanda Vega; 2. Harry Millward	1. Felix Dance; 2. Angela Carr	1. Chris Burson; 2. Samantha Asser
Democrats	Sustainable	Progressives	Legalise Cannabis	Federation
1. Leonie Green; 2. Stephen Jagoe	1. Madeleine Wearne; 2. Robert Long	1. Antoinette Pitt; 2. David Knight	1. Elissa Smith; 2. Wayne Taylor	1. Vern Hughes; 2. Karen Kim; 3. Cheryl Lacey; 4. Chris Mara; 5. Neerja Sewak; 6. Mark O'Connell
Shooters, Fishers and Farmers	Medical Options	Group B	Group R	Group T
1. Ethan Constantinou; 2. Nicole Bourman	1. Nick Clonaridis; 2. Robyn Curnow	1. Damien Richardson; 2. John McBride	1. Morgan Jonas; 2. Monica Smit	1. Susan Benedyka; 2. Christine Richards
Group Y	Ungrouped			
1. Peter Byrne; 2. Jason Wardle	Glenn Floyd; Allen Ridgeway; James Bond; Neal Smith; Max Dicks; Bernardine Atkinson; Paul Ross; Nat De Francesco; Joseph Toscano; Tara Tran; David Dillon; Geraldine Gonsalvez			

=== Western Australia ===
Six seats were up for election. The Labor Party was defending two seats. The Liberal Party was defending three seats. The Greens was defending one seat. Senators Slade Brockman (Liberal), Pat Dodson (Labor), Matt O'Sullivan (Liberal), Louise Pratt (Labor), Linda Reynolds (Liberal) and Jordon Steele-John (Greens) were not up for re-election.

Labor	Liberal	Greens	One Nation	Liberal Democrats
1. Sue Lines*; 2. Glenn Sterle*; 3. Fatima Payman*; 4. Vicki Helps	1. Michaelia Cash*; 2. Dean Smith*; 3. Ben Small; 4. Sherry Sufi	1. Dorinda Cox*; 2. River Clarke; 3. Simone Collins; 4. Donald Clarke; 5. Jordan Cahill; 6. Alex Wallace	1. Paul Filing; 2. Sheila Mundy	1. Kate Fantinel; 2. Peter McLoughlin
Western Australia	Great Australian	Citizens	Animal Justice	Socialist Alliance
1. Matthew McDowall; 2. Julie Matheson	1. Rod Culleton; 2. Samantha Vinci	1. Denise Brailey; 2. Jean Robinson	1. Amanda Dorn; 2. Elizabeth McCasker	1. Petrina Harley; 2. Alex Salmon
Medical Options	Australian Democrats	Christians	Fusion	Federal ICAC
1. Michelle Kinsella; 2. Leanne Lockyer	1. Elana Mitchell; 2. Simon Simson	1. Mike Crichton; 2. Maryka Groenewald	1. Tim Viljoen; 2. Adam Woodings	1. Matthew Count; 2. Dianne Watkins
Australian Values	United Australia	Sustainable Australia	Legalise Cannabis	Federation
1. Rebecca Pizzey; 2. Kathy Fitzpatrick	1. James McDonald; 2. Rob Forster	1. Karen Oborn; 2. Ryan Oostryck	1. Nicola Johnson; 2. Aaron Peet	1. Judy Wilyman; 2. Leanne Barrett
Group K	Group P	Ungrouped		
1. Gerry Georgatos; 2. Megan Krakouer	1. Cam Tinley; 2. Tricia Ayre	Ziggi Murphy; Ashley Buckle; Peter McDonald; Yunous Vagh; Bob Burdett (SUP); Valentine Pegrum		

== Summary by party ==
Beside each party is the number of seats contested by that party in the House of Representatives for each state, as well as an indication of whether the party contested the Senate election in the respective state.

== Disendorsements and resignations ==
Those with resignation or disendorsement dates before 21 April 2022 are not running on the ballot paper under the party they are listed under, but those after that date still made the ballot paper.

Date	Party	Candidate	Seat	Details
October 2021	Great Australian	Pete Evans	NSW Senate	Resigned for reasons unknown.
26 February	UAP	Jefferson Earl	Macnamara	Disendorsed for support of Russian President, Vladimir Putin during the 2021–2022 Russo-Ukrainian crisis.
4 March	UAP	Sean Ambrose	NSW Senate	Resigned to protest NATO's stance against Putin.
5 March	UAP	Morgan C Jonas	Flinders	Jonas is contesting the Senate as a grouped independent in Victoria, with the endorsement of the Reignite Democracy Australia group.
16 March	Liberal	Christopher Ride	Macnamara	Resigned for reasons unknown.
24 March	UAP	Timothy Banfield	Whitlam	Claimed that he left the party and campaign because there was a lack of freedom for candidates.
29 March	Progressives	Emilia Leonetti	Dobell	Stepped down following the AEC's decision to deregister the party, alongside the fact that she considered it "not feasible".
27 March	Western Australia	Sean Butler	WA Senate	Resigned due to concerns over the way the party is run.
7 April	Labor	Peter Tsambalas	Hughes	Withdrew his candidacy due to section 44 concerns surrounding his citizenship of Greece.
15 April	One Nation	Rebecca Lloyd	Brisbane	Disendorsed after failing to follow party directions to remove videos attacking news reports of an AEC investigation. She later announced she'd be running for the Senate in Queensland, as a grouped independent alongside ex-LNP and ex-One Nation MP, Steve Dickson.
22 April	Team Baz	Barry Du Bois	NSW Senate	Withdrew his candidacy citing health reasons.
27 April	Animal Justice	Suzanne Clarke	Rankin	Resigned after making comments about transgender people that were against party policy.
27 April	Animal Justice	Linda McCarthy	Forde	Resigned after making comments about transgender people that were against party policy.
