= Burt Award for First Nations, Inuit and Métis Literature =

Canadian literary award

- Awarded for: Excellence in Canadian indigenous literature for youth
- Country: Canada
- Presented by: Canadian Organization for Development through Education; Canada Council
- First award: 2013
- Website: www.codecan.org/burt-award-canada

The Burt Award for First Nations, Inuit and Métis Literature is a Canadian literary award, presented annually to works judged to be the best works of young adult literature published by indigenous writers in Canada. The award is sponsored by the Canadian Organization for Development through Education (CODE), a Canadian charitable organization devoted to literacy and education, and philanthropist William Burt, and administered by the Canada Council. Several other organizations, including the Assembly of First Nations, the Métis National Council, Inuit Tapiriit Kanatami, the National Association of Friendship Centres and the Association of Canadian Publishers, are also involved in the award's administration.

Announced in 2012, the award was presented for the first time in 2013.

The award presents a first prize of $12,000, a second prize of $8,000 and a third prize of $5,000 annually. In addition to the prize money, CODE purchases 2,500 copies of each of the prize-winning titles, for free distribution to indigenous community libraries, schools and community centres across Canada as part of the foundation's literacy program.

In June 2019, CODE announced that in addition to the existing award for English language literature, it will be expanded to incorporate a second award for works published in indigenous languages.

== Winners ==
| Year | Category | Author | Title | Result | Ref. |
|---|---|---|---|---|---|
| 2013 | | Richard Wagamese | Indian Horse | Winner | |
| 2013 | | Tara Lee Morin | As I Remember It | Second | |
| 2013 | | James Bartleman | As Long As the Rivers Flow | Third | |
| 2014 | | Monique Gray Smith | Tilly, a Story of Hope and Resilience | Winner | |
| 2014 | | Thomas King | The Inconvenient Indian: A Curious Account of Native People in North America | Second | |
| 2014 | | Bev Sellars | They Called Me Number One | Third | |
| 2015 | | Rachel Qitsualik-Tinsley and Sean Qitsualik-Tinsley | Skraelings: Arctic Moon Magick | Winner | |
| 2015 | | Frank Christopher Busch | Grey Eyes | Second | |
| 2015 | | Aaron Paquette | Lightfinder | Third | |
| 2016 | | Patti LaBoucane-Benson and Kelly Mellings | The Outside Circle | Winner | |
| 2016 | | Joseph Auguste Merasty and David Carpenter | The Education of Augie Merasty | Honour | |
| 2017 | | Katherena Vermette | The Break | Winner | |
| 2017 | | Susan Currie | The Mask That Sang | Finalist | |
| 2017 | | Aviaq Johnston | Those Who Run in the Sky | Finalist | |
| 2018 | | Cherie Dimaline | The Marrow Thieves | Winner | |
| 2018 | | Adam Garnet Jones | Fire Song | Honour | |
| 2018 | | Richard Van Camp and Monique Gray Smith | The Journey Forward: Two Novellas on Reconciliation | Honour | |
| 2019 | English Language | Richard Van Camp | Moccasin Square Gardens | Winner | |
| 2019 | English Language | Michael Hutchinson | The Case of Windy Lake | Honour | |
| 2019 | English Language | Aviaq Johnston | Those Who Dwell Below | Finalist | |
| 2019 | Indigenous Language | Shane Koyczan with Soloman Ratt (trans.) | Inconvenient Skin | Winner | |
| 2019 | Indigenous Language | Aviaq Johnston with Blandina Tulugarjuk (Inuktitut trans.) | Those Who Run in the Sky | Finalist | |
| 2019 | Indigenous Language | Richard Van Camp with K. Mateus (illus.) and Doris Camsel (trans.) | Tree Feathers / South Slavery | Finalist | |
