= Australian Freedom Conference =

- Duration: 21 June – 1 July
- Venue: Cairns Convention Centre (21 June); Brisbane Entertainment Centre (22 June); Adelaide Convention Centre (23 June); Perth CEC (24 June); ICC Sydney (28 June); Melbourne CEC (1 July)
- Theme: Right-wing politics
- Organised by: Clive Palmer
- Participants: Tucker Carlson; Dinesh D'Souza; Melissa McCann; Clive Palmer

The Australian Freedom Conference is a 2024 tour of Australia by American right-wing political commentator Tucker Carlson and Australian businessman and former politician Clive Palmer (the leader of the United Australia Party). The events, titled Freedom Conferences, are being held around Australia with several guest speakers, including Dr Melissa McCann (a Queensland GP who is against COVID-19 vaccine mandates) and American filmmaker and conspiracy theorist Dinesh D'Souza.

Hosted by Palmer's mining company, Mineralogy, the tour claims to raise awareness for threats to freedom and democracy in the Western world. The tours criticise Western governments for allegedly violating human rights, with a particular focus on issues such as restrictions during the COVID-19 pandemic. However, the tour has been widely criticised for promoting conspiracy theories, misinformation and Trumpist propaganda, with some even labelling Carlson's views as Putinist.

At the Brisbane event pro-democracy activist Drew Pavlou staged a pro-Ukrainian protest, and was fined nearly $1000 AUD.
