= The Break (Vermette novel) =

2016 novel by Katherena Vermette

- Paperback first edition
- Author: Katherena Vermette
- Language: English
- Published: 2016 (House of Anansi Press)
- Publication place: Canada
- Media type: Print
- Pages: 360 pp (first edition)
- ISBN: 9781487001117
- OCLC: 1030019770

The Break is the first novel by the Canadian author Katherena Vermette published in 2016 by House of Anansi Press.

The book tells the story of Stella, a Métis woman, who witnesses a crime in "The Break", a barren stretch of hydro land near her house in the North End neighbourhood of Winnipeg.

The novel was shortlisted for the Rogers Writers' Trust Fiction Prize and Governor General's Award for English-language fiction. and won the Burt Award for First Nations, Métis and Inuit Literature.
