= Chelsea Vowel =

Métis writer and educator

- Born: Lac Ste. Anne
- Occupation: Writer
- Website: âpihtawikosisân: Law. Language. Culture.

Chelsea Vowel, who often writes as âpihtawikosisân (Cree syllabics: ᐋᐱᐦᑕᐃᐧᑯᓯᓵᐣ, IPA: [aːpɪhtəwɪkosɪsaːn], i.e., Métis, lit. "half-son"), is a Métis writer and educator from near Lac Ste. Anne, Alberta, Canada, whose work focuses on language, gender identity, and cultural resurgence. She has been published in the Huffington Post, The National Post, and The Globe and Mail.

Co-host of the podcast Métis in Space and runner of the IndigenousXca Twitter account, Vowel has been noted as a "prominent and respected Métis blogger" and "one of the most visible of [the] new generation" of Métis intellectuals.

As of 2023, Vowel is a Cree language instructor at the University of Alberta. as well as a mother, author, and podcaster.

== Education and personal life ==
Vowel received a Bachelor in Education degree from the University of Alberta in 2000. After graduating, she taught in Inuvik, Northwest Territories, before returning to graduate with Bachelor of Law degree in 2009.

After completing her law degree, she moved to Montreal, where she worked with Inuit youth who were in the foster care system, including those sentenced under the Youth Criminal Justice Act. She currently holds a BEd, LLB, and MA.

As per Vowel's personal website and pertaining to her personal life, she is currently working as a Cree language instructor at the Faculty of Native Studies at her alma mater, the University of Alberta She is a podcaster, vlogger, academic, writer, and the mother of 6 children.

== Fictional Works ==
Vowel has been presently active in her publication of and contribution to fictional works.

In 2014, she published two essays in the collection The Winter We Danced: Voices From the Past, the Future, and the Idle No More Movement.

In 2022, Vowel released Buffalo is the New Buffalo, a collection of short stories which revolved around Indigenous futurisms and further "sought to discover the impact of colonization, remove its psychological baggage, and recover ancestral traditions. These eight short stories of "Metis futurism" explore Indigenous existence and resistance through the specific lens of being Metis." Buffalo is the New Buffalo was short listed for the Indigenous Voices Award in 2023.

Vowel is the co-host of the podcast Métis in Space, an "Indigenous, feminist, sci-fi podcast" with Molly Swain. Métis in Space advertises itself with the tag line: "What happens when two Métis women, who happen to be sci-fi nerds, drink wine and deconstruct the science fiction genre from a decolonial lense?" The podcast emphasizes topics in science fiction, and allows for conversation about how colonialism is impacting literature, and how to decolonize literature as a genre.

== Opinion Pieces and Non-Fiction ==
Vowel has also published non-fiction works, including opinion pieces, and historical non-fiction.

In 2016, she released her first book, Indigenous Writes: A Guide to First Nations, Métis & Inuit Issues in Canada, a collection of essays aimed at explaining Indigenous issues in the Canadian context to non-Indigenous people. The collection was praised for Vowel's "caustic style and astute insights" and compared favorably to Thomas King's The Inconvenient Indian. It earned Vowel a nomination for the Concordia University First Book Prize. Indigenous Writes was also featured on numerous 2017 and 2018 to-read lists by the CBC, Globe and Mail, and other publications.

In 2018, Vowel contributed a poem to the critical anthology Refuse: CanLit in Ruins, which engages with historical and current issues in Canadian literature.

In 2019, she contributed to the graphic novel anthology This Place: 150 Years Retold, which chronicles the last 150 years of colonialism in Canada through the perspectives of acclaimed Indigenous authors such as Richard Van Camp and Katherena Vermette.

Vowel has also been credited with multiple opinion pieces for the CBC (Canadian Broadcasting Corporation). She has written most notably, about political concerns regarding the Métis nation and about the missing and murdered Indigenous women in Canada. Her most recent work for CBC, was in 2018, although her involvement within the opinion column for CBC stretches back to early 2014. Her last article for them, in 2018, was on the importance of giving her children Cree names, and the reclaiming of indigenous identity as a result- reminiscent of the themes of many of her fiction works.

She further has written opinion pieces for the Ottawa Citizen on Indigenous topics, the most notable of which being about the distracting nature of indigenous reconciliation for political Liberals.

Most recently, in February 2023, Vowel presented for the Climate Justice Organizing Hub on Settler Colonialism

== Activism and Political Involvement ==
Vowel is well known for her work promoting the protection and preservation of Indigenous languages in Canada, critiquing the public perception that Indigenous languages are on the rise and highlighting the risk of these languages becoming extinct. Vowel's work has openly called for education reform in Canada and Indigenous control of Indigenous education.

Vowel's work is inherently political itself, noted by the author to be both a social commentary and a criticism of the treatment of Indigenous populations, especially those within Canada. Indigenous Writes most directly comments, through her non-fiction work, on the politicization of Indigenous groups, while thematically her fictional works create underlying commentary about the political nature of being both Indigenous and a woman.

In 2014 Vowel was responsible for the creation of the Idle No More: Blockade role-playing video game. This game is told from the perspective of a young Cree woman who is working to defend traditional land, with the hope of having players identify with the struggle of Indigenous communities and to learn about the Idle No More movement.

In 2018 OpenCanada included Vowel on their annual Twitterati list which highlights the work of Indigenous people responding to policy in Canada and abroad.

== Bibliography ==
Year	Title	Publisher	ISBN	Contribution
2014	The Winter We Danced: Voices From the Past, the Future, and the Idle No More Movement	ARP Books	9781894037518	Essays
2015	Indigenous Writes: A Guide to First Nations, Métis & Inuit Issues in Canada	HighWater Press	9781553796800	Full text
2018	Refuse: CanLit in Ruins	Book*hug Press	9781771664318	Poem
2019	This Place: 150 Years Retold	Portage & Main Press	9781553799467	Chapter (writing)
2022	Buffalo Is the New Buffalo	Arsenal Pulp Press	9781551528793	Short story collection
