= Lorna Russell =

Canadian artist (1933–2023)

- Born: Lorna Muriel Russell; October 4, 1933; Saskatoon, Saskatchewan, Canada
- Died: January 19, 2023 (aged 89); Saskatoon, Saskatchewan, Canada
- Education: University of Saskatchewan
- Known for: watercolourist, painter in gouache and oil, printmaker

Lorna Muriel Russell (October 4, 1933 – January 19, 2023) was a Canadian artist, known for her distinctive prairie landscapes in watercolor, guache, and oil that interpret her home province of Saskatchewan.

== Life and career ==
Lorna Russell was born in Saskatoon, Saskatchewan and attended the University of Saskatchewan where she received a Bachelor of Science in 1956. In 1968 she received her Professional "A" Teaching Certificate from the University of Saskatchewan. She has participated in solo and group exhibitions. In 1981, she had a retrospective at the Shoestring Gallery. In 1983, her drawings from 1980 to 1983 were exhibited at the Mendel Art Gallery. Her work is represented in the collections of the Canada Council Art Bank (Ottawa), MacKenzie Art Gallery (Regina), Mendel Art Gallery (Saskatoon), Moose Jaw Art Museum and National Exhibition Centre, Kamloops Public Art Gallery, and the Saskatchewan Arts Board, as well as elsewhere.

Russell taught art education in public, elementary and high school in Saskatoon, Saskatchewan from 1968 to 1970. Starting in 1968 (to 1972) she also worked as an art consultant for the Saskatchewan Teachers Federation and Saskatchewan Society for Education Through Art. In 1971, Russell, along with Dorothy Boerma, Ann Newdigate, Jo Claire, and Betty Meyers, founded the Shoestring gallery which has since changed its name to A.K.A. gallery. She worked as education officer with the Mendel Art Gallery from 1972 to 1976 and in 1976 she worked as an art instructor at the Muenster Art Program. After retiring from teaching, Russell continued to be involved with Saskatoon's art community, and in 2002, she returned to the University of Saskatchewan campus to lead a watercolour class through the university's Extension Division's Community Arts Program.

Russell lived in Saskatoon, where she died on January 19, 2023, at the age of 89.

== Connections ==
Russell and her garden in Saskatoon were photographed by close friend and artist Honor Elizabeth Kever in Kever's photograph "Garden, 1989".
