= This Place: 150 Years Retold =

2019 graphic novel anthology

- Date: April 30, 2019
- Publisher: HighWater Press
- ISBN: 978-1553797586

This Place: 150 Years Retold is a 2019 graphic novel anthology by HighWater Press. Featuring ten chapters by different writers and artists, it details important events in Indigenous history in Canada, including both biographical stories and fictional accounts based on real events. The book received a podcast adaption in 2021 from the Canadian Broadcasting Corporation.

== Chapters ==
The book includes a foreword by Alicia Elliott. Each chapter opens with a timeline of relevant events and a forward by the chapter's author.

=== Anne of Red River ===
Written by Katherena Vermette, illustrated by Scott B. Henderson, and coloured by Donovan Yaciuk

In October 1868, Annie Bannatyne, a Red River Métis woman, encounters Louis Riel, who has come to Red River from Montreal, while walking with her husband Andrew Bannatyne. In November, her husband hosts journalist Charles Mair, of whom Annie is distrustful. In February 1869, a letter Mair with mocking comments about "half-breed" women is published in the Daily Globe Toronto, claiming they refuse to farm and are jealous of and hostile to white women, enraging Annie. When Mair returns to Red River later that month, Annie publicly horse-whips him. The story closes with Louis Riel watching the aftermath of the event, smiling.

=== Tilted Ground ===
Written by Sonny Assu, illustrated by Kyle Charles and coloured by Scott A. Ford

William "Billy" Assu, Sonny Assu's great-great-grandfather, is taught how to become a Ligwiłda'x̱w Chief of the Wiwēqaýi after being adopted by his uncle Wamish. Following a report by Israel Wood Powell, John A. MacDonald enacts a law banning potlatches, which comes in effect in 1885. After his uncle dies and he becomes chief, Billy Assu secretly continues conducting potlatches in defiance of the Potlatch Ban.

=== Red Clouds ===
Written by Jen Storm, illustrated and coloured by Natasha Donovan

In the 1900s, an Anishinaabe woman who turns into a windigo after eating the flesh of her dead husband. After the others in her community notice her bizarre behavior upon her return, Zhauwuno-geezhigo-gaubow/Jack Fiddler, a windigo hunter, kills her, and she curses him as she dies. In 1907, he is put on trial by the RCMP for murder. He hangs himself before the trial, and the ghost of the windigo woman mocks him as he dies. Fiddler's brother John is also arrested and dies of tuberculosis in a penitentiary.

=== Peggy ===
Written by David A. Robertson and illustrated and coloured by Natasha Donovan

A biography of Ojibwe WWI soldier Francis Pegahmagabow. It starts in the Second Battle of Ypres in 1915 and follows him becoming a chief in 1921.

=== Rosie ===
Written by Rachel and Sean Qitsualik-Tinsley, illustrated and coloured by GMB Chomichuk

In the 1940s, a young Inuit girl nicknamed Pauki learns about Inuit shamanism from her mentor Iqqaq. Her mentor gifts her small carving of a mustelid, which contains a guardian spirit from whose perspective the story is told. One day, a white man approaches her, asking to buy the carving. She tells him of her nicknames Pauki and Rosia, and then tells him her true name in Inuktitut, panicking the spirit as revealing her true name could make her vulnerable. The man leaves, saying she should stick to the name Rosie. While Iqqaq leaves for war, Aasivak, a hostile shaman, attacks the girl, and as the spirit fears the sharing of her true name has weakened its ability to protect her from Aasivak's spirit. However, it is revealed Iqqaq gave her his own name, rebuffing Aasivak. Two years later, she meets the white man again, and this time tells him her name is Rosie.

=== Nimkii ===
Written by Kateri Akiwenzie-Damm, illustrated by Ryan Howe and Jen Storm, and coloured by Donovan Yaciuk

In 1990, Nimkii, an Anishinaabe woman, tells her daughter about her life during the Sixties Scoop. Having been taken from her widowed mother at age six, at thirteen she become foster siblings with a ten-year-old boy named Teddy. After their foster parents brutally beat Teddy, the two run away, but Teddy gets caught while taking food from a house. He is returned to their foster parents and is forced to stay inside, while Nimkii, living in the woods, conspires to free him. One morning, after telling Teddy she was going to save him the previous day, she learns he died by suicide, leaving a note telling her she was his hero on a tree. Back in 1990, Nimkii hugs her daughter while the other people of their home of Wabaseemoong reserve blocks the Children's Aid Society from removing any more children.

=== Like a Razor Slash ===
Written by Richard Van Camp, illustrated by Scott B. Henderson, and coloured by Scott A. Ford

In 1975 in Fort Good Hope in the Northwest Territories, Dene Chief Frank T'Seleie successfully fights against the proposed Mackenzie Valley Pipeline, giving a speech to Thomas R. Berger during the inquiry for the pipeline.

=== Migwite'tmeg: We Remember It ===
Written by Brandon Mitchell, illustrated by Tara Audibert, and coloured by Donova Yaciuk

In 1981, the Mi'kmaq community of Listuguj, fight the Quebec government and the Quebec Provincial Police to maintain their right to fish for salmon.

=== Warrior Nation ===
Written by Niigaanwewidam James Sinclair, illustrated and coloured by Andrew Lodwick

In 1990, Washashk, an Anishinaabe teen boy disinterested in Indigenous identity and history, and his residential school survivor mother Raven travel to Kanehsatà:ke to support the community during the Oka Crisis. He befriends a girl named Kanontienentha, and the two become pen pals afterwards. They reunite five years later in college, and the two protest events such as the killing of Dudley George. The chapter ends with the signing of the Kelowna Accord, with Washashk in the background, and Washashk driving his now-wife Kanontienentha, their baby daughter, and his mother home.

=== kitaskînaw 2350 ===
Written by Chelsea Vowel, illustrated by Tara Audibert, and coloured by Donovan Yaciuk

Unlike the other chapters which focus on the past, "kitaskînaw 2350" is a speculative future fiction story. In the year 2350, "returners" from Mars who abandoned Earth following decolonization arrive at Kisiskâciwani-sîpiy (North Saskatchewan River), resulting in conflict with the people living there. A Cree teen named Wâpanacâhkos is chosen by the community's elders to travel back in time to learn about 21st-century Indigenous-settler relations and better understand colonial mindsets. In 2012, she befriends Wāri, a contemporary Mohawk activist, at a mall, then ends up flashing to 2013, where she encounters Wāri again at protest against Southwestern Energy Canada. Wâpanacâhkos then travels in 2016, when she meets Wāri at a camp preparing to protest the Dakota Access Pipeine, and Wāri tells her about her past as a foster child. Wâpanacâhkos spends the next three years helping Wāri and her activist friends, where she learns about events such Project Sitka, the killing of Colten Boushie, and the death of Tina Fontaine. Returning to 2350, Wâpanacâhkos heals and goes to face the returners.

== Podcast ==
In 2021, the book was adapted into a 10-part podcast by the Canadian Broadcasting Corporation, produced and hosted by Rosanna Deerchild, Eva Grant, and Jacquie Black.

== Reception ==
Kirkus Reviews called This Place "illuminating [and] self-assured" and cited "Red Clouds" and "Rosie" as the book's most notable stories. Publishers Weekly was overall positive, though they described "kitaskînaw 2350" as "heavily didactic," and concluded that "the anthology's theme and authentically told stories make it a stand-out." The Canadian magazine Quill & Quire, in a starred review, described the book as a "fantastic teaching tool for junior and high-school students and a great read for any age."

School Library Journal listed This Place as one of the best graphic novels of 2019.

=== Accolades ===
Year	Award	Result	Reference
2019	Cybils Award for Young Adult Graphic Novel	Won	
2020	Doug Wright Award for Best Book	Shortlisted	
2020	Joe Shuster Award for Anthology Collections	Won	
2020	USBBY Outstanding International Books List	Included	
2021	Manitoba Book Awards - Graphic Novel	Won	
