= This River (film) =

- Directed by: Katherena Vermette; Erika MacPherson
- Written by: Katherena Vermette; Erika MacPherson
- Produced by: Alicia Smith
- Starring: Kyle Kematch
- Cinematography: Iris Ng
- Edited by: Erika MacPherson
- Production company: National Film Board
- Release date: 2016
- Running time: 18 minutes
- Country: Canada
- Language: English

This River is a 2016 Canadian short documentary film directed by Katherena Vermette and Erika MacPherson. The film centres on Drag the Red, a volunteer group in Manitoba who search the Red River for the bodies of Missing and Murdered Indigenous Women.

Smith has stated that it was Vermette's North End Love Songs which helped draw her attention to the perspectives of indigenous youth from the North End and the experience of having missing family members.

Principal photography took place August 8 to 16, 2016, with an all-woman crew documenting the work of Drag the Red volunteer Kyle Kematch. The crew spent much of that time filming from a small fleet of donated boats. The director of photographer was Iris Ng, with Anita Lubosh recording sound.

The film received the 2016 Coup de coeur du jury award at Montreal's Terres en vues/Land InSights First Peoples' Festival and had its public premiere in Vermette's hometown of Winnipeg on October 5 at the Winnipeg Art Gallery. At the 5th Canadian Screen Awards in 2017, the film won the Canadian Screen Award for Best Short Documentary Film.

== What Brings Us Here ==
Vermette and producer Alicia Smith also created a related Instagram work, What Brings Us Here, which offers portraits of volunteers behind the community-run Winnipeg search teams the Bear Clan and Drag the Red.

What Brings Us Here features photos by Winnipeg photographers Janine Kropla, Mark Reimer and Karen Asher. The online work combines images of searchers with their statements about why they are continuing to look for loved ones—and answers.
