= IndigenousX =

Australian media company

IndigenousX is an Australian Aboriginal owned and operated independent media company founded in 2012 by Gamilaroi man Luke Pearson.

== History and description ==
IndigenousX began as a rotating Twitter account showcasing diverse Indigenous Australian experiences and perspectives. Kath Viner, then head of Australian digital operations of Guardian Australia, approached IndigenousX with an opportunity to collaborate with The Guardian. The account has been called "one of Australia's leading online platforms featuring true representations of Aboriginal and Torres Strait Islander voices", and highlighted for its influential role in public debate and the example it sets in the evolution of news media. The weekly host of the Twitter account has an article published within the IndigenousX column in Guardian Australia.

Past IndigenousX hosts include social justice commissioner Mick Gooda, activist Amy McQuire, academic Marcia Langton, blogger Celeste Liddle, rapper Adam Briggs, former elite rugby union player Mark Ella, former Olympian and government minister Nova Peris, lawyer John Paul Janke, and actor Miranda Tapsell.

== IndigenousXca ==
A spinoff account, IndigenousXca, covers First Nations, Inuit and Métis experiences in Canada. Operated by Chelsea Vowel, IndigenousXca was instrumental in raising issues around prominent author Joseph Boyden's claimed Indigenous heritage.

== Luke Pearson ==
Luke Pearson subsequently became digital engagement and editorial specialist at NITV. He has also worked as a "teacher, mentor, counsellor, public speaker, collaborator, mediator, facilitator, events manager, researcher, evaluator, reporter and much more".
