= Frank Christopher Busch =

Cree writer from Canada

- Born: June 5, 1978 (age 48); Saskatoon, Saskatchewan, Canada
- Occupations: Novelist, Executive
- Writing career
- Period: 2010s–present
- Notable work: Grey Eyes

Frank Christopher Busch is a Cree writer from Canada, who was a winner of the Burt Award for First Nations, Métis and Inuit Literature in 2015 for his debut novel Grey Eyes.

A member of the Nisichawayasihk Cree Nation in Manitoba, he wrote the novel after interviewing Indian residential school survivors while working for a law firm in Winnipeg. He currently lives on the Westbank First Nation in British Columbia, where he is Vice President of Business Development at Strategies North Advisory Inc., and CEO of Kelso Technologies Inc.

Frank Busch holds a bachelor's degree in Indigenous Studies from the University of Manitoba, 5 certificates from the Canadian Securities Institute and a Post-Graduate Certificate in Finance from Harvard University. Working with the First Nations Finance Authority, he was involved in deploying over $725 million to First Nations across the country, and has visited over 275 First Nations communities.
