= Sean Qitsualik-Tinsley =

Canadian writer

- Born: Sean Tinsley
- Occupation: writer
- Spouse: Rachel Qitsualik-Tinsley
- Writing career
- Genre: young adult literature
- Notable work: Skraelings

Sean Qitsualik-Tinsley is a Canadian writer. He was a winner of the Burt Award for First Nations, Métis and Inuit Literature in 2015 for Skraelings, which he cowrote with his wife Rachel Qitsualik-Tinsley. The book was also a shortlisted finalist for the Governor General's Award for English-language children's literature at the 2014 Governor General's Awards.

The duo also cowrote the 2008 book Qanuq Pinngurnirmata, a volume of Inuit mythology. The book was reissued in 2015 as How Things Came to Be: Inuit Stories of Creation.

Of Scottish and Mohawk heritage, he was a second-place finalist in the Writers of the Future competition in 2005 for his short story "Green Angel".

== Publications ==
| Year | Title | Author | Illustrator |
|---|---|---|---|
| 2011 | Ajjiit | Sean and Rachel Qitsualik-Tinsley | Andrew Trabbold |
| 2013 | The Raven and the Loon | Rachel and Sean Qitsualik-Tinsley | Kim Smith |
| 2014 | Skraelings | Rachel and Sean Qitsualik-Tinsley | Andrew Trabbold |
| 2014 | The Walrus Who Escaped | Rachel and Sean Qitsualik-Tinsley | Anthony Brennan |
| 2014 | Tuniit: Mysterious Folk of the Arctic | Rachel and Sean Qitsualik-Tinsley | Sean Bigham |
| 2015 | How Things Came To Be | Rachel and Sean Qitsualik-Tinsley | Emily Fiegenschuh and Patricia Ann Lewis-MacDougall |
| 2015 | Stories of Survival and Revenge: From Inuit Folklore | Rachel and Sean Qitsualik-Tinsley | Jeremy Mohler |
| 2017 | Why the Monster | Sean and Rachel Qitsualik-Tinsley | Toma Feizo Gas |
| 2019 | "Rosie" in This Place: 150 Years Retold | Rachel and Sean Qitsualik-Tinsley | GMB Chomichuk |
