= Aviaq Johnston =

Canadian Inuk writer from Igloolik (born 1992)

Aviaq Johnston (born October 23, 1992) is a Canadian Inuk writer from Igloolik, based in Iqaluit, Nunavut.

Her mother is from Quaqtaq and her father is from Montreal. She is a graduate of Nunavut Sivuniksavut in Ottawa and has a diploma in social work from Canadore College.

Her debut young adult novel Those Who Run in the Sky won the inaugural Indigenous Voices Award for English Prose. The novel was also a finalist for the Governor General's Award for English-language children's literature at the 2017 Governor General's Awards, and for the Burt Award for First Nations, Inuit and Métis Literature.

She has also published the children's book What's My Superpower? (2017), and received a Governor General's History Award in 2014 for her short story "Tarnikuluk".

Johnston was listed as one of 18 writers to watch by in 2018 by CBC Books.

In 2018, she was a writer for the third season of the children's program Anaana's Tent. She is a writer and executive story editor for the comedy series North of North.

== Awards ==
Year	Nominated work	Award	Category	Result	Ref.
2014	"Tarnikuluk"	Indigenous Arts & Stories	Writing	Winner	
2014	"Tarnikuluk"	Governor General's Awards	History Award	Winner	
2017	Those Who Run in the Sky	Governor General's Awards	English-language children's literature	Finalist	
2017	Those Who Run in the Sky	Burt Award for First Nations, Inuit and Métis Literature		Finalist	
2017	Those Who Run in the Sky	Foreword INDIES	Young Adult Fiction	Finalist	
2018	Those Who Run in the Sky	Indigenous Voices Awards	English Prose	Winner	
2021	Quel est mon superpouvoir?	Prix des libraires du Québec	Jeunesse 0-5 ans Hors Québec	Finalist	

== Works ==
=== Books ===
==== Novels ====
- Those Who Run in the Sky (2017)
- Those Who Dwell Below (2019)
- Grandfather Bowhead, Tell Me a Story (2021)
- Leave Our Bones Where They Lay (2025)

==== Children's books ====
- What's My Superpower? (illustrated by Tim Mack, 2017)
- TJ's New Friend (illustrated by Charlene Chua, 2019)
- Celebrations in Nunavut (illustrated by Lenny Lishchenko, 2019)
- TJ and the Sleepover (illustrated by Jesus Lopez, 2020)
- Inuki's Birthday Party (illustrated by Ali Hinch, 2020)
- Showing You Care (illustrated by Amiel Sandland, 2020)
- Sometimes I Feel Shy (illustrated by Amiel Sandland, 2021)
- Saying What You Think (illustrated by Amiel Sandland, 2023)

=== Short stories ===
- "Tarnikuluk" (2014)
- "Iqsinaqtutalik Piqtuq: The Haunted Blizzard" in Taaqtumi: An Anthology of Arctic Horror Stories (2019)
- "Maniittuq" in Taaqtumi Volume 2: An Anthology of Arctic Horror Stories (2025)
