= TNL (political party) =

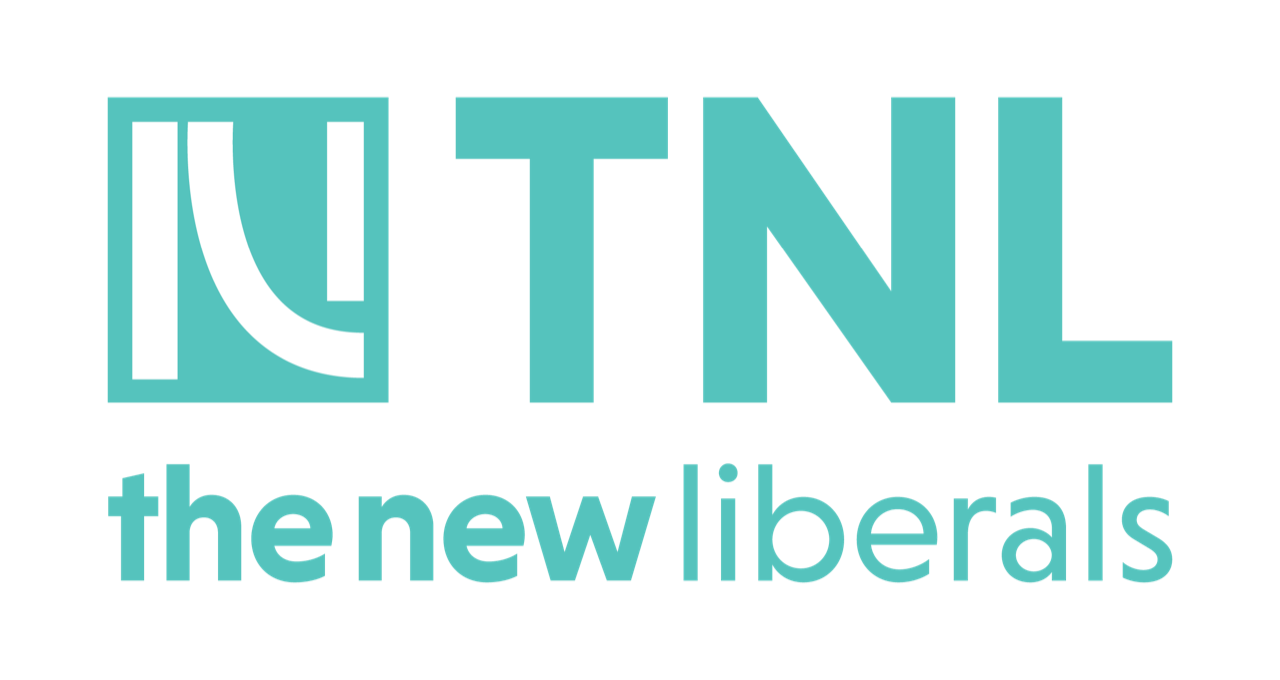
- Abbreviation: TNL
- Leader: Bess Brennan
- General Secretary: Steve Hopley
- President: Katharine Kline
- Founder: Victor Kline
- Founded: 2019; 6 years ago
- Registered: 3 June 2021
- Dissolved: 28 November 2023
- Headquarters: 53 Martin Place, Sydney, New South Wales
- Ideology: Modern monetary theory; Social liberalism; Republicanism
- Political position: Centre to centre-left
- Colors: Teal
- Slogan: "Economically responsible. Socially progressive."

Website
- tnl.net.au

TNL, formerly registered as The New Liberals, was an Australian political party formed in 2019. Victor Kline, a barrister from Sydney, was the founder and party leader. By the party's dissolution, the party president was Katharine Kline and the party leader was Bess Brennan.

== History ==
=== Foundation and registration ===
Victor Kline and three friends founded TNL in 2019 in response to what they saw as "a government that had apparently mastered the art of bare-faced corruption and an opposition that seemed incapable of calling them out". Initially, the party was named "The New Liberals". Kline claimed that the word "liberal" has twisted into a misnomer by the Liberal Party of Australia, and that many moderate disaffected Liberal and ex-Liberal voters are attracted to TNL.

In the 2020 Eden-Monaro by-election, Karen Porter ran as an independent under the party banner. She received 1.28% of votes, placing 7th out of 14 candidates.

The party's registration was approved by the Australian Electoral Commission on 3 June 2021. The Liberal Party of Australia objected to the registration, due to the similarity in party names and the potential to cause confusion among electors. Due to changes to the Commonwealth Electoral Act 1918 regarding party names, this decision overturned by the Australian Electoral Commission and the party's registration was revoked on 7 December 2021. The party was re-registered again as TNL on 17 March 2022.

Alex Turnbull, the son of former prime minister Malcolm Turnbull, joined TNL in August 2021.

At the 2022 federal election, the party endorsed eight candidates for the House of Representatives, in four states. None were successful. The party also endorsed a total of eight candidates for the Senate, two in New South Wales and six in Queensland.

The party was de-registered on 28 November 2023.

=== Christian Porter case ===
In June 2021, Kline announced that he, along with party candidate and former prosecutor Vania Holt, would be pursuing a private criminal case against Christian Porter over rape allegations he is facing.

== Policies ==
Some of the party's key policies included:

- A federal anti corruption commission.
- A climate policy with the goal of achieving net-zero carbon emissions by 2030.
- A full employment and job guarantee scheme (JGS).
- Support for Housing First.
- Placing a Bill of Rights into the Constitution.

== Leadership ==
- Victor Kline (2019–2022)
- Katharine Kline – president (2022–dissolution)
- Bess Brennan – party leader (2022–dissolution)

== See also ==
- Fusion Party
