= Tara Lee Morin =

Canadian writer

- Born: Manitoba
- Occupations: poet, memoirist
- Writing career
- Period: 2010s–present
- Notable work: As I Remember It

Tara Lee Morin is a Canadian writer, who was a finalist for the 2013 Burt Award for First Nations, Métis and Inuit Literature for her book As I Remember It.

Born in a remote First Nations community in northern Manitoba to a teenage mother, Morin was removed by social services authorities from her birth home and spent her childhood growing up in a series of foster homes. As an adolescent she struggled with drug and alcohol abuse, and was involved in both criminal activity and prostitution. As I Remember It, her first published book, is a memoir of both her struggles and her experience rebuilding her life in a more positive and healthy direction. It was first published in 2011 by Theytus Books, a British Columbia-based publisher of First Nations literature.

Morin has also written poetry.
