= Rachel Qitsualik-Tinsley =

Canadian writer

- Born: Rachel Attituq Qitsualik; Nunavut, Canada
- Occupation: writer
- Spouse: Sean Qitsualik-Tinsley
- Writing career
- Genre: young adult literature
- Notable work: Skraelings

Rachel Attituq Qitsualik-Tinsley is a Canadian writer. She was a winner of the Burt Award for First Nations, Métis and Inuit Literature in 2015 for Skraelings, which she cowrote with her husband Sean Qitsualik-Tinsley. The book was also a shortlisted finalist for the Governor General's Award for English-language children's literature at the 2014 Governor General's Awards.

She is of Inuk, Scottish and Cree descent.

The duo also cowrote the 2008 book Qanuq Pinngurnirmata, a volume of Inuit mythology. The book was reissued in 2015 as How Things Came to Be: Inuit Stories of Creation.

She works as an Inuktitut language translator, and has written both non-fiction and short stories about Inuit culture. In 2012, she was awarded the Queen Elizabeth II Diamond Jubilee Medal for her writing.

In 2017, she ran as a candidate in the Nunavut territorial election for the electoral district of Quttiktuq. Qitsualik-Tinsley finished in last place in her riding, with 0 votes.

== Publications ==
Year	Title	Author	Illustrator
2011	The Shadows that Rush Past	Rachel Qitsualik-Tinsley	Emily Fiegenschuh and Larry MacDougall
2011	Ajjiit	Sean and Rachel Qitsualik-Tinsley	Andrew Trabbold
2012	Under the Ice	Rachel Qitsualik-Tinsley	Jae Korim, Art Direction by Babah Kalluk
2013	The Raven and the Loon	Rachel and Sean Qitsualik-Tinsley	Kim Smith
2014	Skraelings	Rachel and Sean Qitsualik-Tinsley	Andrew Trabbold
2014	The Walrus Who Escaped	Rachel and Sean Qitsualik-Tinsley	Anthony Brennan
2014	Tuniit: Mysterious Folk of the Arctic	Rachel and Sean Qitsualik-Tinsley	Sean Bigham
2015	How Things Came To Be	Rachel and Sean Qitsualik-Tinsley	Emily Fiegenschuh and Patricia Ann Lewis-MacDougall
2015	Stories of Survival and Revenge: From Inuit Folklore	Rachel and Sean Qitsualik-Tinsley	Jeremy Mohler
2017	Why the Monster	Sean and Rachel Qitsualik-Tinsley	Toma Feizo Gas
2019	"Rosie", in This Place: 150 Years Retold	Rachel and Sean Qitsualik-Tinsley	GMB Chomichuk
2019	"Lounge", in Taaqtumi: An Anthology of Arctic Horror Stories	Sean and Rachel Qitsualik-Tinsley	
2020	Tanna's Owl	Rachel and Sean Qitsualik-Tinsley	Yong Ling Kang
2022	Tanna's Lemming	Rachel and Sean Qitsualik-Tinsley	Tamara Campeau
