= Pemmican Wars =

2017 historical fiction graphic novel by Katherena Vermette

- Author: Katherena Vermette
- Illustrators: Scott B. Henderson and Donovan Yaciuk
- Series: A Girl Called Echo
- Publisher: HighWater Press
- Publication date: 2017
- ISBN: 9781553796787
- Followed by: Red River Resistance

Pemmican Wars is a 2017 historical fiction graphic novel written by Katherena Vermette and illustrated by Scott B. Henderson and Donovan Yaciuk.

== Plot ==
Pemmican Wars follows Echo, a 13-year-old who recently began living in a group home and is socially isolated. During history class on her first day of school, the teacher begins talking about the Métis and Echo experiences a vivid flashback to 19th-century Saskatchewan, where she is immersed in the sights and sounds of a bison hunt.

As days go by, she continues to be inexplicably drawn back in time, where she witnesses events from the era of the Pemmican Wars, a period marked by conflicts between European settlers and the Métis. Echo's growing curiosity about her own heritage compels her to visit her mother in rehab, sparking a journey of self-discovery that intertwines her present and her ancestral past.

== Reception ==
Kirkus Reviews called Pemmican Wars "a sparse, beautifully drawn story about a teen discovering her heritage."

Jodeana Kruse, writing for School Library Journal, highlighted the novel's diverse characters, including Echo's "[I]ndigenous ancestors, a queer teacher, and a housemate who is differently abled".

Multiple reviewers commented on the sparse text and depth of the imagery. Kirkus Reviews called the art "dazzling [...], offering a mostly visual, deeply contemplative juxtaposition of the present and the past". School Library Journal's Jodeana Kruse wrote, "Gorgeously rendered panels convey Echo's isolation in the real world and comfort in the past. The work is light on text, and its brevity makes it feel more like plot exposition than a fully fleshed out novel." Publishers Weekly noted that Pemmican Wars "shows much but says little, much like its protagonist: Echo barely has 20 lines of dialogue, and many of those are one-word responses. Instead, the volume begs to be revisited for its reliance on visual clues." They concluded by saying, "Vermette's scope is admirable as the story broadens from one of teenage social isolation to that of greater disenfranchisement and the search for selfhood."

Booklist also reviewed the novel.
