= Christopher Ride =

Australian novelist

- Born: 1965 (age 60–61); Canberra, Australia
- Occupation: Owner - Auskelp Pty Ltd
- Writing career
- Period: Early 21st century
- Genres: Science fiction, thriller, time travel
- Subject: Writer

Christopher Ride (born 1965 in Canberra, Australia) is a science fiction and thriller writer. He lives in Melbourne, Australia. He is also managing director of Interactive, an IT service provider, and has won the 2011 Southern Region Ernst & Young Entrepreneur of the Year for Technology award.

== Early life ==
At age 20 Ride had lived in seven countries including Burma, Peru, Turkey, Canada and the United States, witnessed three military coups, a category 5 hurricane, a 7.75 Richter scale earthquake and lived in Tanzania during the war against Idi Amin.

== Career ==
Managing Director of Interactive Pty Ltd, 1999–2017, Australia's largest privately owned IT company. Ride led the organisation to 18 years of successive growth. Ride remained a Director at Interactive until 2019. In 2019 he founded Auskelp Pty Ltd. Auskelp's mission is to build Australia's first large-scale kelp enterprise. A new-age industry for a rapidly changing world. In 2021 he founded Aetium Pty Ltd. Aetium's mission is to accelerate the transition to net zero by mobilising large-scale, credible climate action from everyday people.

== Writing ==
Ride self-published his first novel, The Schumann Frequency, in 2007. He was signed by Random House Australia (who re-released The Schumann Frequency in 2009) thereafter to a multiple-book deal for his Overseer Series. The second book in the series The First Boxer was released in 2009 (Later renamed "The last Empress" in 2012) and a third installment The Inca Curse followed in 2012.

== Bibliography ==
=== The Overseer Series ===
1. The Schumann Frequency (2007) | ISBN 9781863256582
2. The Last Empress (previously titled The First Boxer) (2009) | ISBN 9781863256605
3. The Inca Curse (2012) | ISBN 9781742750118
