= Those Who Run in the Sky =

Children's coming-of-age fantasy novel

- Author: Aviaq Johnston
- Language: English, Inuktitut
- Genre: Children's literature, Fantasy, Magical realism, Coming of age,
- Publisher: Inhabit Media
- Publication date: March 8, 2017
- Publication place: United States
- Media type: Print
- Followed by: Those Who Dwell Below

Those Who Run in the Sky is a middle-grade fantasy novel by Aviaq Johnston, published March 8, 2017 by Inhabit Media. The novel is the first in the series, followed by Those Who Dwell Below.

The book has an English edition, as well as an Inuktitut edition.

== Reception ==
Those Who Run in the Sky received starred reviews from Kirkus Reviews, as well as positive reviews from CM: Canadian Review of Materials, Medium, and Foreword Reviews. The book also received the following accolades:

- Manitoba Young Readers' Choice Award Nominee for Northern Lights (2019)
- Indie Book Awards finalist (2017)
- Burt Award for First Nations, Inuit and Métis Young Adult Literature Honor Book (2017)
- Governor General's Literary Awards: Young people's literature — text (2017)
- CBC's Best Canadian Young Adult and Children's Books of 2017
