= Katherena Vermette =

Canadian writer (born 1977)

- Born: 29 January 1977 (age 49); Winnipeg, Manitoba, Canada
- Education: University of British Columbia (creative writing)
- Occupations: Poet, novelist, documentary filmmaker
- Writing career
- Period: 2010s–present
- Genres: Poetry, novels, graphic novels, children's literature
- Notable works: North End Love Songs; The Break; The Strangers; This River
- Notable awards: Governor General's Award for English-language poetry (2013); Amazon.ca First Novel Award (2017); Burt Award for First Nations, Inuit and Métis Literature (2017); Atwood Gibson Writers' Trust Fiction Prize (2021)
- Website: katherenavermette.com

Katherena Vermette (Note: Vermette stylizes her name without capitals.) (born 29 January 1977) is a Canadian writer, who won the Governor General's Award for English-language poetry in 2013 for her collection North End Love Songs. Vermette is of Métis descent and originates from Winnipeg, Manitoba. She was an MFA student in creative writing at the University of British Columbia.

In addition to writing, Vermette advocates for the equality of Indigenous peoples in Canada, vocalizing her dissatisfaction with the Canadian government and media's apathy and neglect of Indigenous rights.

== Early life ==
Born to a Métis father and Mennonite mother, Vermette grew up in the North End of Winnipeg, Manitoba, a neighbourhood distinguished by a relatively high population of Indigenous people (approximately 25%), primarily First Nations and Métis people. In an interview with CBC Radio, Vermette described her childhood as not being "picturesque." For Vermette, growing up in the North End meant that she bore witness to injustice and prejudice from a young age; when she was 14, Vermette lost her older brother, 18-year-old Donovan, who was missing for six months prior to being found dead. Vermette asserts that the combination of Donovan's young age, his pre-disappearance circumstances of being at a bar with friends, and his being Cree meant that his disappearance did not get adequate coverage by the media. Vermette cites the apathy shown by her community and the media surrounding her brother's disappearance as instigating her awareness of the discrimination against Indigenous peoples by settler Canadians.

== Career ==
Katherena Vermette is known primarily for her poetry, although she is also a writer of prose.

=== North End Love Songs ===
Vermette's first published volume of poetry, North End Love Songs functions as an ode to the place she grew up, Winnipeg's North End. In the work, she describes her neighbourhood through highlighting its relationship to nature. The collection depicts a "young girl or woman struggling with identity and place."

=== "Heart" ===
A poem commissioned by CBC Aboriginal, "Heart" similarly depicts the North End of Winnipeg from Vermette's point of view. Vermette aims to change the narrative from "that North End", known for being a "lost cause", to the way she knows it. Vermette calls the North End the "heart of the Métis nation."

=== The Seven Teachings Stories ===
Vermette's children's picture book book series The Seven Teachings Stories was published by HighWater Press in 2015. Illustrated by Irene Kuziw, the collection aims to present the Anishnaabe Teachings of the Seven Grandfathers in a way that is easily digestible for young people. The series depicts Indigenous children in a metropolitan context. The series comprises seven individual volumes: The Just Right Gift, Singing Sisters, The First Day, Kode's Quest(ion), Amik Loves School, Misaabe's Stories, and What is Truth, Betsy?.

=== The Break ===
Her debut novel The Break was published in 2016, and was shortlisted for that year's Rogers Writers' Trust Fiction Prize and Governor General's Award for English-language fiction. In November 2017, it won the Burt Award for First Nations, Inuit and Métis Literature.

=== Film and digital media ===
In 2015, she and Erika MacPherson co-directed the 20-minute National Film Board of Canada documentary This River, about Canadian Indigenous families that have had to search for family members who have disappeared. Partly based on Vermette's own experience, the film received the 2016 Coup de coeur du jury award at Montreal's Présence autochtone festival, and premiered in vermette's hometown of Winnipeg on October 5, at the Winnipeg Art Gallery. It was named Best Short Documentary at the 5th Canadian Screen Awards. Vermette and NFB producer Alicia Smith also created a related Instagram work, What Brings Us Here, a companion piece to The River, which offers portraits of volunteers behind the community-run Winnipeg search teams the Bear Clan and Drag the Red.

=== Other work ===
She is a member of the Aboriginal Writers Collective of Manitoba, and edited the anthology xxx ndn: love and lust in ndn country in 2011.

Her work was published in the literary anthology Manitowapow: Aboriginal Writings from the Land of Water.

== Activism ==
Vermette works with young people who are ostracized due to their circumstances and labelled "at risk". She ran a workshop on using writing to cope with growing up marginalized. Vermette promotes developing young people's artistic voices through poetry.

Vermette has described her writing as motivated by an activist spirit, particularly on First Nations issues.

== Awards and honours ==
When Vermette won the Governor General's Literary Award for Poetry in 2013, Vermette considered not accepting the award, as a means of protesting the Canadian government's treatment of Missing and Murdered Indigenous Women and the government’s policies in general. Ultimately, she decided to accept the award because the people who voted for North End Love Songs were a collection of her literary peers, making it a reflection of the Canadian poetry community, rather than the Canadian government.

=== Literary awards ===
- 2013 – Governor General's Award for English-language poetry for North End Love Songs.
- 2017 – Amazon.ca First Novel Award for The Break.
- 2017 – Burt Award for First Nations, Inuit and Métis Literature for The Break.
- 2018 – Le Combat des livres winner for Ligne brisée, the French translation of The Break, defended by Naomi Fontaine.
- 2021 – Atwood Gibson Writers' Trust Fiction Prize for The Strangers.

=== Literary shortlists and longlists ===
- 2016 – Shortlisted for the Rogers Writers' Trust Fiction Prize for The Break.
- 2016 – Shortlisted for the Governor General's Award for English-language fiction for The Break.
- 2024 – Longlisted for the Giller Prize for Real Ones.

=== Film awards ===
- 2016 – Coup de cœur Jury Award at the Présence autochtone festival in Montreal for This River, co-directed with Erika MacPherson.
- 2017 – Best Short Documentary at the 5th Canadian Screen Awards for This River.

== Works ==
=== Novels ===
- The Break (2016)
- The Strangers (2021)
- The Circle (2023)
- Real Ones (2024)

=== Poetry collections ===
- North End Love Songs (2012)
- river woman (2018)
- Procession (2025)

=== Graphic novels ===
- Pemmican Wars (2017)
- Red River Resistance (2018)
- Northwest Resistance (2020)
- Road Allowance Era (2021)

=== Children's books ===
- The Seven Teachings Stories (2015, series)
- The Girl and the Wolf (2019)
