= Celeste Liddle =

Australian unionist and writer (born 1978)

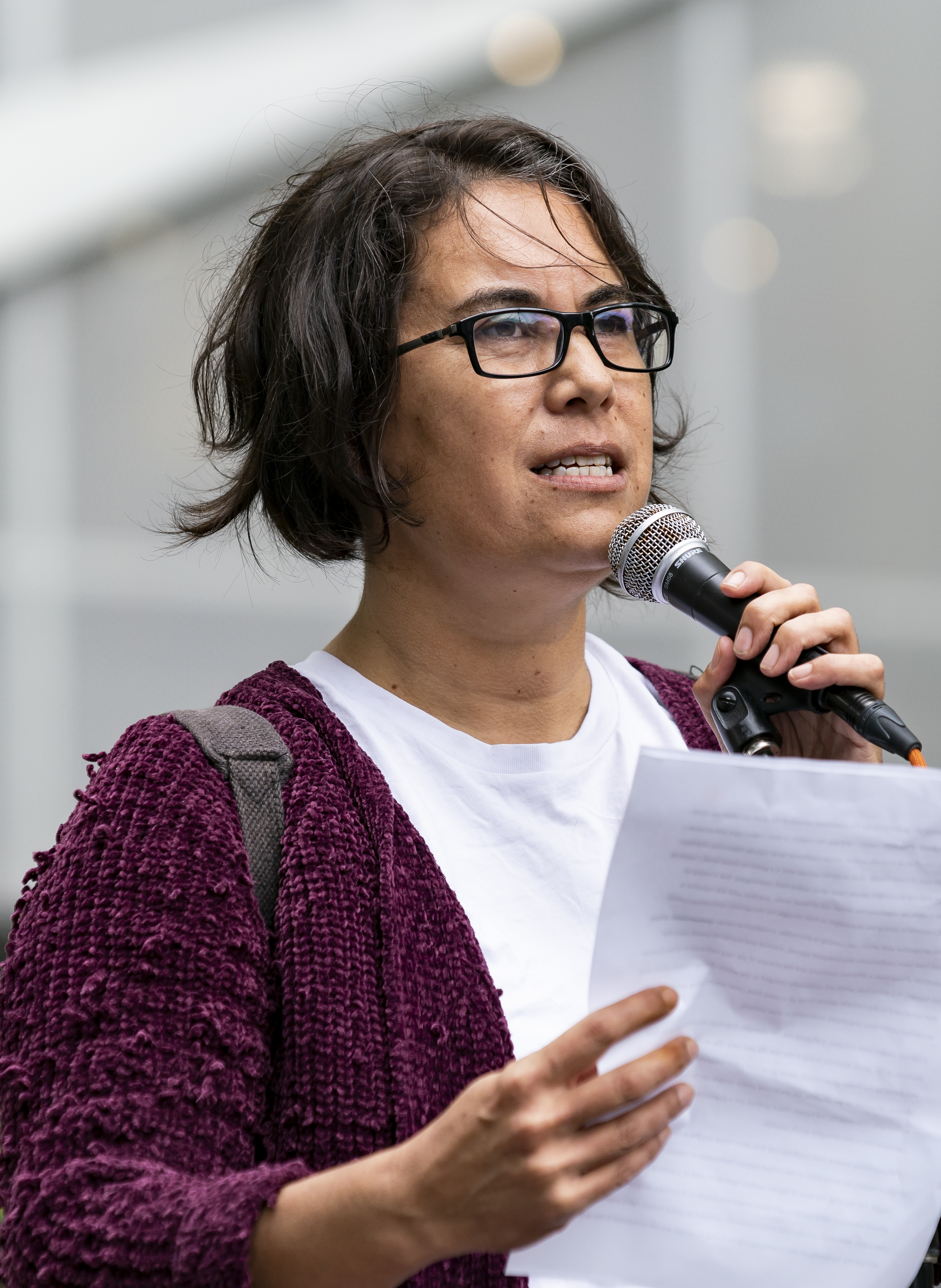
- Liddle at a Melbourne rally in February 2022
- Born: 1978 (age 47–48); Canberra, Australian Capital Territory, Australia
- Education: La Trobe University; University of Melbourne; Monash University
- Occupations: Writer and unionist
- Political party: Greens (2021–2023)
- Website: Rantings of an Aboriginal Feminist

Celeste Liddle (born 1978) is an Aboriginal Australian unionist, writer, and Indigenous feminist of the Arrernte people of Central Australia. Having first risen to prominence via her personal blog, Rantings of an Aboriginal Feminist, Liddle has written opinion and commentary for several media publications and anthologies.

== Early life and education ==
Liddle was born in Canberra, Australia, in 1978. She moved to Melbourne with her family in 1992, when she was 14. Her paternal grandmother Emily Liddle (née Perkins) was a member of the Stolen Generations and lived at Jay Creek settlement for a period. Her paternal grandfather was Harold Liddle, an Arrernte man, and veteran from World War II. On her non-Indigenous maternal side, she has English, Irish, and Dutch Burgher heritage, and is a descendant of Sacramento shipwreck survivors, as well as of Dutch revolutionary Quint Ondaatje.

She has an honours degree in arts from La Trobe University, a graduate diploma from the University of Melbourne and a masters in communications and media studies from Monash University. In 2020, Liddle undertook a master's degree at Monash. and in 2021 was awarded the Academic Medal for Excellence.

== Career ==
=== Writing and broadcasting ===
Liddle hosted the IndigenousX program from 19 June 2015.

She has been a regular columnist for Eureka Street since 2017, having written her first opinion piece for them two years earlier. She has also been a columnist and featured writer for Daily Life, The Saturday Paper, and The Guardian. She has also provided commentary for the Australian Broadcasting Corporation (ABC) and Special Broadcasting Service (SBS).

In addition to opinion writing, Liddle has been published in a number of anthologies, including Black Inc's Growing Up Aboriginal In Australia, Pan McMillan's "Mothers and Others" and Hardie Grant's "Better than Sex".

She has been involved in several major literary events, including the All About Women Festival, Melbourne Writers Festival, the Antidote Festival, The Melbourne Anarchist Bookfair and the Bendigo Writers' Festival.

=== Activism and unionism ===
As of 2023, Liddle works as National Aboriginal and Torres Strait Islander Organiser for the National Tertiary Education Union (NTEU). She was instrumental in ensuring that the NTEU vocally supported the campaign to raise the age of criminal responsibility in Australia.

=== Politics ===
In May 2021, Liddle was preselected by the Victorian Greens for the seat of Cooper in the 2022 federal election. Cooper is the Melbourne electorate where she has lived for over 20 years. Her campaign set out to include dental into Medicare, enhance workers' rights, increase renewable energy in response to the climate emergency, and work towards truth and treaty for First Nations people. Liddle was also a strong advocate for the Greens policy to tax billionaires and for Melbourne's live music and arts scenes.

In the 2022 election, Liddle received 27.7% of the primary vote, coming second to the incumbent Labor member Ged Kearney. Liddle increased the Greens primary vote by 6.43% while Labor's decreased by 5.5% on the previous election.

Liddle left the Greens in February 2023.

== Recognition ==
In 2017, Liddle was inducted into the Victorian Honour Roll of Women.

== Personal life ==
As of 2024, Liddle is in a relationship with schoolteacher Tara Burnett, who succeeded her as the Greens candidate in Cooper for the 2025 federal election.
