= Honor Elizabeth Kever =

- Born: October 18, 1948 (age 77); Boise, Idaho, United States
- Other names: Honor Kever Rogers, Honor Rogers
- Education: San Antonio College, Cleveland Institute of Art, University of Texas, Arizona State University, University of Saskatchewan (BFA)
- Known for: Drawing, printmaking, photography, illustrator
- Spouse: David Carpenter

Honor Elizabeth Kever (born October 14, 1948) is an American-born Canadian visual artist, and illustrator. She resides in Saskatoon, Saskatchewan. She was formerly known as Honor Rogers.

== Biography ==
Honor Elizabeth Kever was born on October 14, 1948, in Boise, Idaho. She has been a Canadian citizen since 1975. Until 1988, she worked and exhibited under the name "Honor Rogers".

Kever attended the San Antonio College from 1966 to 1967; the Cleveland Institute of Art from 1967 to 1968; the University of Texas at Austin from 1968 to 1969; and Arizona State University from 1974 to 1975. She received a BFA degree from the University of Saskatchewan in 1977.

Kever is married to Saskatoon writer David Carpenter (writer). She is an active member of the Saskatoon arts community working as an instructor at several institutions including The Photographers Gallery, Saskatchewan School for the Arts, and Mendel Art Gallery, as well as working at the Photographers Gallery as an Exhibitions Coordinator.

Kever has participated in solo and group exhibitions and has illustrated a children's book.

== Works ==
=== Public collections ===
Her work is held by Canada Council Art Bank, Mendel Art Gallery, Saskatchewan Arts Board, and University of Saskatchewan

=== Group exhibitions ===
- 2002–2003 Bequest, Art Gallery of Swift Current, Swift Current; Little Gallery, Prince Albert; Rosemont Gallery, Regina; Estevan Art Gallery and Museum, Estevan; Moose Jaw Museum and Gallery, Moose Jaw; Prairie Art Gallery, Grande Prairie.
- 2001 Exploring the Collections: The Admittance of Photography, Dunlop Gallery, Regina
- 1998 Saskatchewan Perspective: An Exhibition Celebrating the 50th Anniversary of the Arts Board, Mackenzie Art Gallery, Regina
- Work, Home and Heaven: Environment and Culture in the Work of Prairie Photographers 1918-1995, Mendel Art Gallery, Saskatoon
- 1994 Alternative Nature, Mendel Art Gallery
- Women And, Snelgrove Gallery, Saskatoon
- 1992 My City, Kenderdine Gallery, Saskatoon
- 1989-90 Between Time and Place: Contemporary Saskatchewan Photography, Photographers Gallery, Saskatoon; Toronto Photographers Workshop, Toronto
- 1988 Making Space Presentation House, North Vancouver, Mercer Union, Toronto
- Signs, Signals and Symbols Mendel Art Gallery
- 1986 Out of Saskatchewan, Expo '86, Vancouver
- 1981 Recent Acquisitions, Mendel Art Gallery
- 1980 2nd National Exhibition of Works on or of Paper of Clay, Memphis State Univ. Art Gallery, Memphis, TN
- Miami International Print Biennial, Miami, FL
- 1979 Rockford International Print Exhibition, Rockford, IL
- 1978 1st Canadian Biennale of Prints and Drawings, Alberta College of Art Gallery, Calgary

=== Book Illustration ===
She illustrated The Stonking Steps: A Journey through Ing-ong-ung. Sample illustrations are on the author's webpage.
