= David Carpenter (writer) =

Canadian writer (born 1941)

David C. Carpenter
- Born: 1941 (age 84–85); Edmonton, Alberta, Canada
- Occupations: Author, novelist
- Writing career
- Genre: fiction

David C. Carpenter (born October 28, 1941) is a Canadian writer who lives in Saskatoon, Saskatchewan. His oeuvre, which includes poetry, essays, short stories, novellas, and full-length books in fiction as well as non-fiction genres, focuses primarily on nature and his native western Canada. In 2010, his latest novel, A Hunter's Confession, was released, in which he explores the history of hunting, subsistence hunting versus hunting for sport, trophy hunting, and the meaning of the hunt for those who have written about it most eloquently.

Carpenter holds the Bachelor of Arts degree in modern languages (1962) and the Bachelor of Education degree (1964) from the University of Alberta, the Master of Arts degree in English (1967) from the University of Oregon and the Doctor of Philosophy from the University of Alberta (1973). He is married to artist Honor Keever; they reside in Saskatoon, where he has served on the faculty of the English Department at the University of Saskatchewan since 1975.

== Works ==
- The Forest, a novella by Georges Bugnet, translated from the original La Foret – 1977
- Jokes for the Apocalypse – 1985
- Jewels – 1986
- God's Bedfellows – 1988
- Writing Home – 1994
- Courting Saskatchewan – 1996
- Banjo Lessons – 1997
- Fishing in Western Canada – 2000
- Trout Stream Creed – 2003
- The Ketzer – 2004
- Luck – 2005
- Niceman Cometh – 2008
- Welcome to Canada – 2009
- A Hunter's Confession – 2010
- The Education of Augie Merasty - 2015 (by Joseph Auguste Merasty, with David Carpenter)
