= Terres en vues/Land InSights =

Canada-based organization

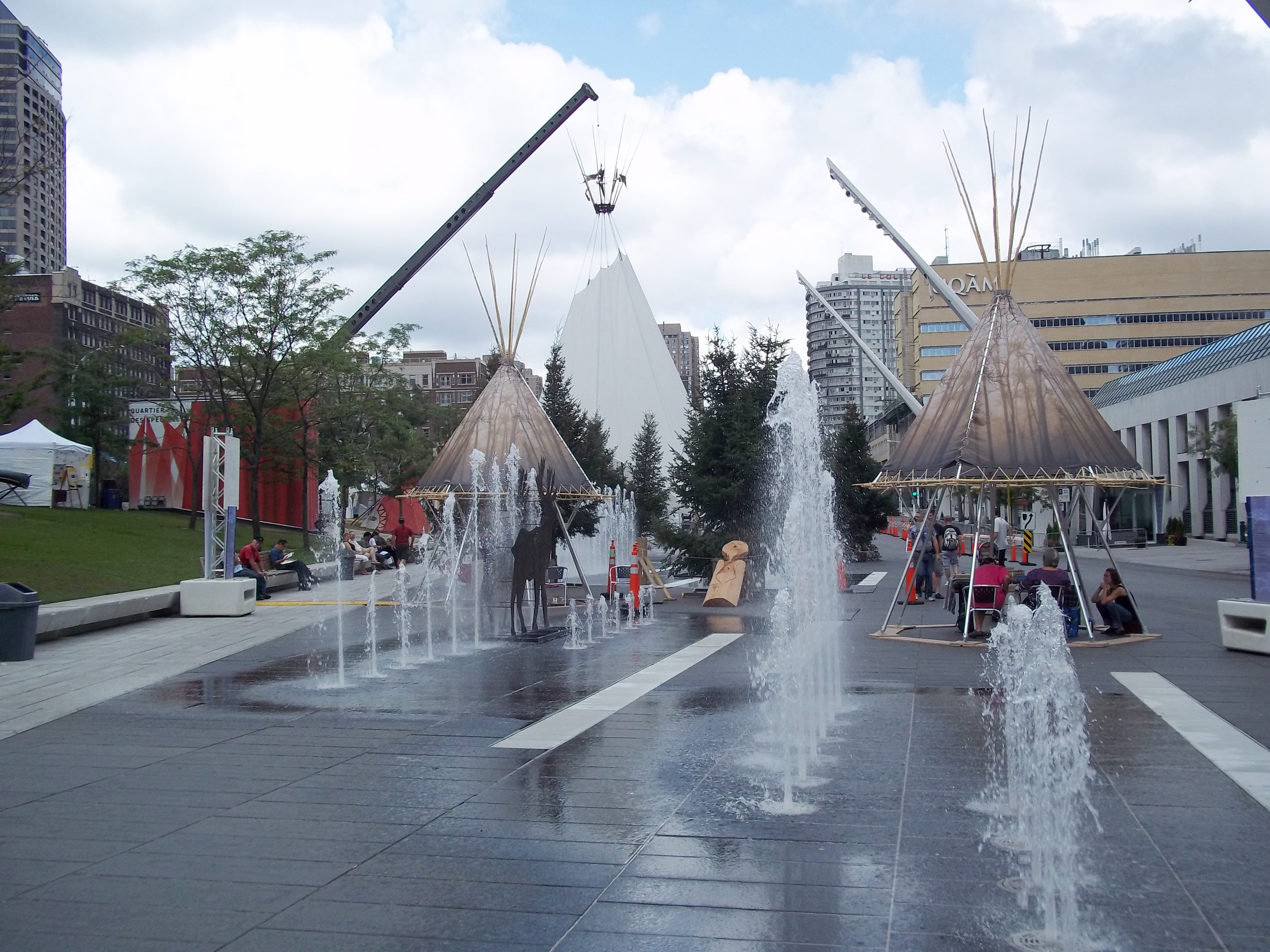
Place des festivals was the stage for the 2011 edition of the festival.

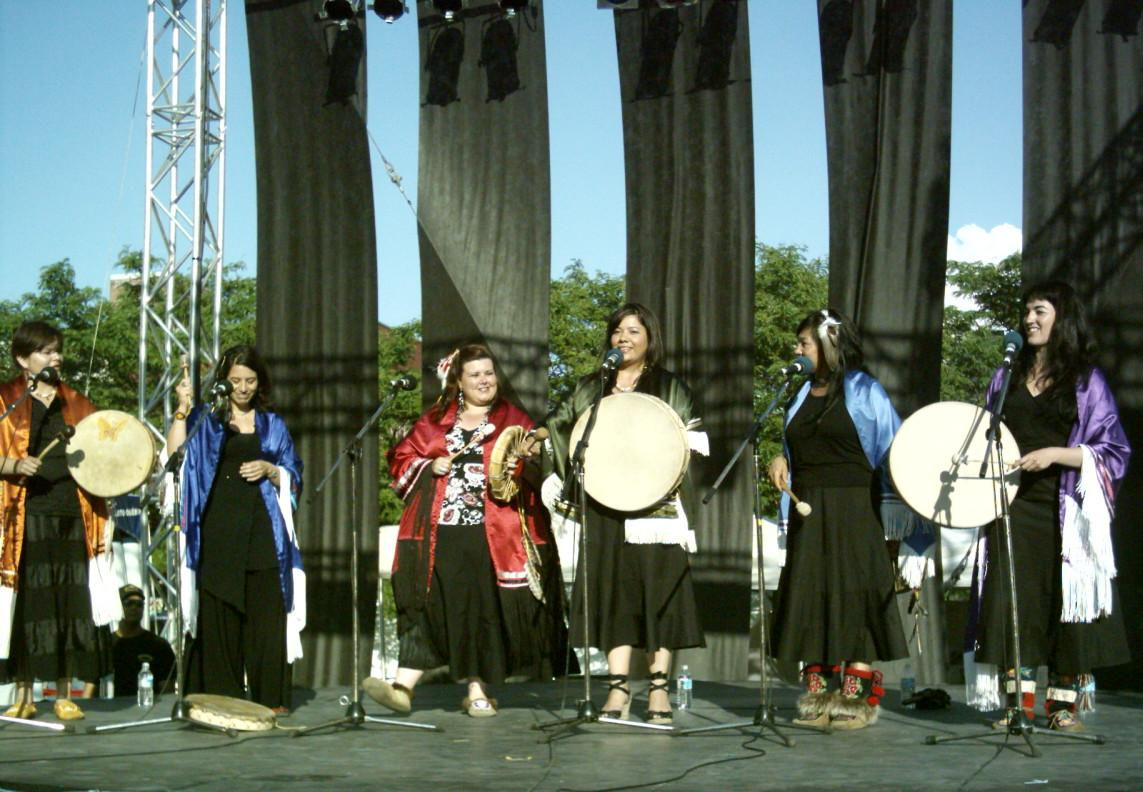
Traditional music at place Émilie-Gamelin, in June 2008

Terres en Vues/Land InSights is a Montreal-based association that promotes Indigenous cultures and encourages intercultural communication by drawing attention to First Peoples' artistic and cultural creations in various media, such as films and documentaries, literature, traditional legends and stories, languages, the visual arts, music and dance.

== History and Structure ==
Terres en Vues/Land InSights was created in 1990 by André Dudemaine, Daniel Corvec, and Pierre Thibeault. Terres en Vues/Land InSights' board is made up of representatives from many First Nations, including the Innu, Cree, Mohawk, Abenaki, and Huron-Wendat nations.

== First Peoples' Festival ==
The association organizes the annual Présence Autochtone First Peoples' Festival, a ten-day celebration of Indigenous cultures from throughout the three Americas. Each August, the enchanting and culturally diverse metropolis of Montreal provides a gathering space where connections are formed and reinforced between many nations. An extensive program of recent films and videos about the Indigenous Peoples of the three Americas is one of the many highlights of the festival. The festival offers the public the opportunity to experience First Peoples' imaginations through films and documentaries, expositions and concerts, debates and encounters, and interactive activities.
