= Drew Pavlou =

Australian political activist (born 1999)

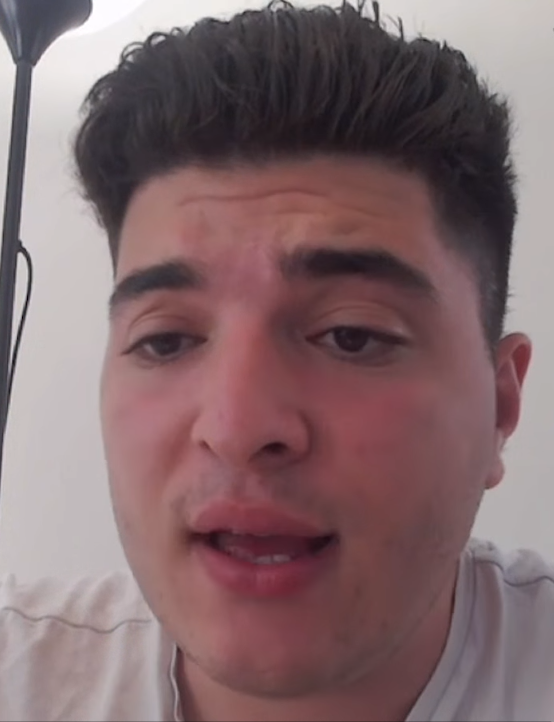
- Pavlou in January 2022

Leader of the Drew Pavlou Democratic Alliance
- In office 21 September 2021 – 6 November 2023
- Preceded by: Office established
- Succeeded by: Office abolished

Personal details
- Born: 4 June 1999 (age 27)
- Party: Drew Pavlou Democratic Alliance (2021–2023)
- Other political affiliations: Katter's Australian Party (2020–2021); Greens (2019–2020); Labor (2019)
- Education: Villanova College; University of Queensland
- Known for: Student activism against the Chinese Communist Party and Chinese government

Drew Pavlou (/ˈpævloʊ/, /-luː/; born 4 June 1999) is an Australian right-wing political activist. Best known for his criticism of the Chinese government and the Chinese Communist Party, and their influence within Australia, Pavlou received coverage for organising protests on-campus in support of the 2019–2020 Hong Kong protests, and later protest activity against the Chinese government.

In May 2020, he was suspended for two years from the University of Queensland (UQ), which alleged 11 instances of misconduct. The action drew national attention in Australia, including from former Prime Minister Kevin Rudd. An appeal of his case by the UQ Senate Disciplinary Appeals Committee upheld two of the initial charges and reduced his suspension to one semester. Pavlou returned to UQ in early 2021.

In September 2021, Pavlou launched a political party named the Drew Pavlou Democratic Alliance. He ran for the Senate in the 2022 federal election, alongside five other candidates, but was unsuccessful. The party was voluntarily de-registered in November 2023. Since 2025, he has become increasingly opposed to immigration.

== Early life and education ==
Drew Pavlou was born on 4 June 1999.

Pavlou's family, who are politically conservative Greek Cypriots from the Larnaca District of Cyprus, had migrated to Australia in the 1960s to open a number of hospitality and retail shops on the Gold Coast in Queensland. His grandmother's brother was a guerrilla with Greek nationalist organisation EOKA, and fought in the Cyprus Emergency.

When he was two years old, his family moved to Brisbane, where he later completed high school at Villanova College. Pavlou was then admitted to the University of Queensland, where he was studying for a Bachelor of Arts majoring in philosophy before his suspension.

== 2019 Hong Kong protests in UQ ==
In July 2019, during the 2019–2020 Hong Kong protests, Pavlou organised a protest at the University of Queensland in support of the Hong Kong democracy movement. He has alleged that he was assaulted twice during clashes with counter-protesters who were supporting the Chinese Government.

=== Suspension from the University of Queensland ===
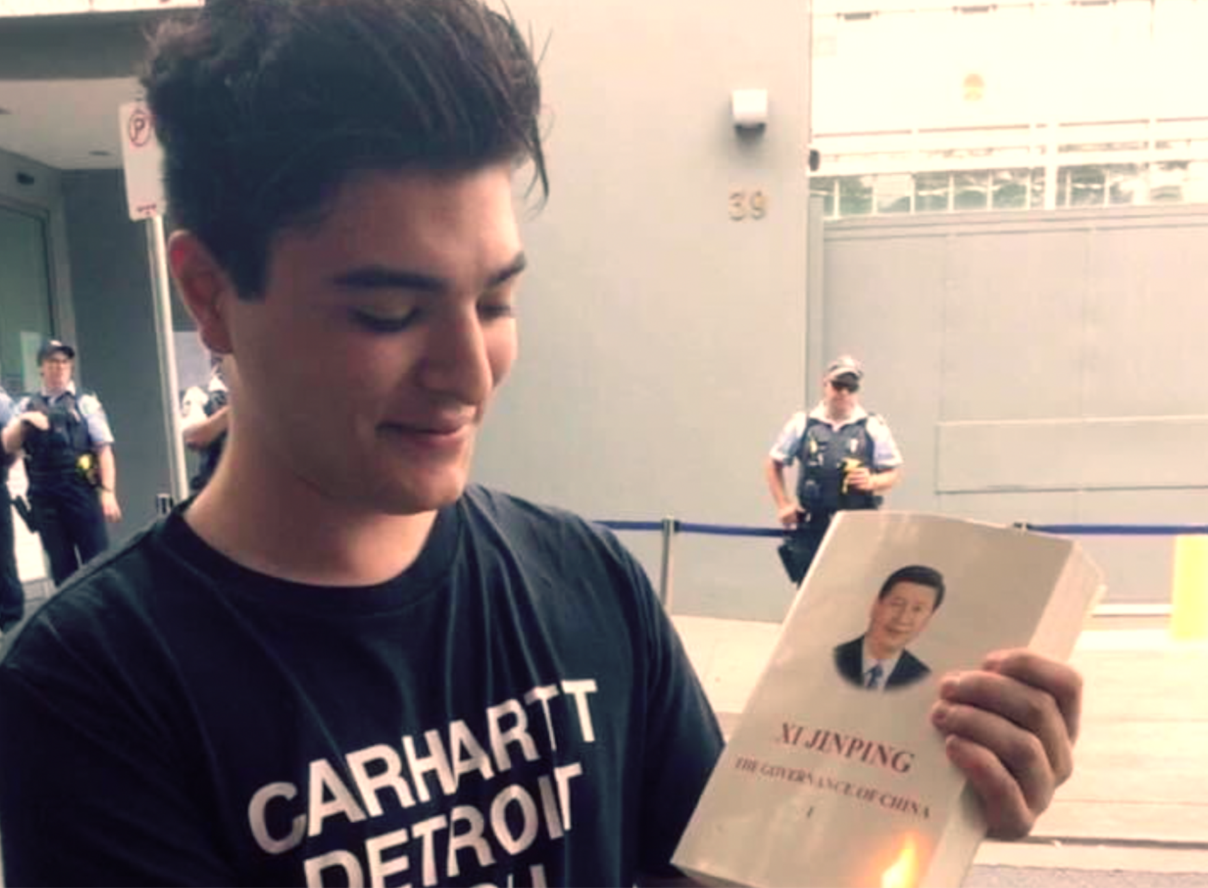
Pavlou in 2020, burning a copy of The Governance of China in front of the consulate general of China in Sydney.

Gerald Roche, a linguist from La Trobe University, accused Pavlou of "narratives that racialise and ethnicise COVID-19, portraying Asians as sources of disease", before filing a complaint against him at UQ. A month later, Pavlou was summoned to the UQ disciplinary board after a 186-page report suggested he violated university student discipline policies 11 times. He was suspended for 2 years.

The charges by the university included Pavlou calling UQ's finance and economics students "cunts", and a PhD candidate a "disgusting mindless slob". The charges further included bullying, discrimination, and harassment of students and staff, both online and on-campus. ABC News has reported that complaints raised to the board include Pavlou improperly claiming to make statements on behalf of the university and a Facebook post of Pavlou posing in front of the UQ Confucius Institute in a biohazard suit during the COVID-19 pandemic.

Pavlou admitted to directing profanity at students on Facebook and another university forum after UQ claimed complaints were raised by a number of students. Pavlou's legal team claimed that they were denied access to confidential university documents that may demonstrate UQ collusion with the Chinese government. A spokesperson for the university stated that the matter did not concern political freedom of speech but misbehaviour, that university policy is developed independently of politics, and that the university was unable to comment directly on the matters of the hearing.

On 29 May, the board handed down its decision to suspend Pavlou for two years, the remainder of Pavlou's tenure as UQ senator. UQ Chancellor Peter Varghese expressed concern on the UQ News website about "the findings and the severity of the penalty", convening an out-of-session meeting of the UQ Senate to discuss the matter.

On 2 June, Pavlou sought a review from the UQ Senate Disciplinary Appeals Committee (SDAC), the appellate body for disciplinary matters formed from the UQ Senate, and student and staff representatives. On 13 July, SDAC issued its findings, concluding that two counts of serious misconduct were justified, however dismissing other charges. As a result, SDAC reduced the suspension from two years to one semester (roughly six months). In a statement released by the Committee and Chancellor Varghese, they explained that "neither of the findings of serious misconduct concerned Mr Pavlou's personal or political views about China or Hong Kong", and that Pavlou is now ineligible to return as a UQ senator, under the University of Queensland Act.

In September 2020, the Queensland Crime and Corruption Commission declined a request by Pavlou to investigate Chancellor Peter Varghese and former Vice-Chancellor Peter Høj, citing "insufficient evidence to suggest anyone who was subject of the complaint had engaged in corrupt conduct". The university responded in a press statement that it was pleased by the findings, and that it had been advised by the commission that no action will be taken.

Pavlou returned to university in early 2021.

=== Court case against the University of Queensland ===
On 11 June 2020, Pavlou launched a case against UQ, Chancellor Varghese, and former Vice-Chancellor Høj, seeking damages of A$3.5 million for an alleged breach of contract and defamation. The case was lodged with the Supreme Court of Queensland. In a response to an ABC News inquiry, a UQ spokesperson said, "when we receive a formal notice of claim we will consider it and respond through the appropriate channels."

== Later protest activity ==
=== Protest in Brisbane ===
In May 2023, Pavlou received two fines totalling $1,000 after a protest he conducted against the Chinese consulate in Brisbane in May 2022. Pavlou had held a handwritten sign in Queen Street Mall reading "Nothing happened on June 4, 1989, change my mind" in reference to the Tiananmen Square massacre, with this form of protest being modelled on an internet meme. He refused to pack up the protest when a Brisbane City Council officer directed that he needed to do so. The fines were given for the sign and for the refusal. Pavlou unsuccessfully challenged the fines in two appeals, with the total amount he owed to the court increasing in May 2024 to $10,000 – including the original fine, Brisbane City Council legal fees, and court costs – after his second appeal. None of Pavlou's convictions were recorded, allowing him to further pursue a legal career. Pavlou completed paying off these fines in February 2026, after receiving donations from supporters.

=== 2022 Wimbledon Peng Shuai Protest ===
On 10 July 2022, Pavlou was thrown out of the 2022 Wimbledon men's singles final for interrupting the match to shout "where is Peng Shuai", in reference to the Chinese tennis player who disappeared after accusing retired Vice Premier of China Zhang Gaoli of sexual assault. Pavlou claimed that security staff pushed him over a row of seats and down a flight of stairs – where he hit his head on a wall – while twisting his arms behind his back. Wimbledon officials denied Pavlou's claims of excessive force. An All England Club spokesman stated that "a spectator was removed from Centre Court after disrupting play by shouting, running down the stairs and causing a nuisance to their fellow spectators. The individual was removed by security colleagues and escorted off the grounds"; while Pavlou said, "I'm sorry that I disrupted the match for 30 seconds, I tried to pick a break in between games to silently hold up my WhereIsPengShuai sign but security immediately crash tackled me which is why I shouted out so people would hear Peng Shuai's name on the broadcast."

=== Protest in London ===
On 22 July 2022, Pavlou was arrested by the Metropolitan Police outside the Chinese Embassy in London, while protesting alleged human rights violations perpetrated by the Chinese state, by displaying the flags of Tibet, Taiwan, and East Turkestan. As part of the protest, he glued one of his hands to the embassy's front gate.

Pavlou said that he was detained for 23 hours incommunicado without access to lawyers, for an alleged bomb threat. He claimed that during his detainment, he had been treated poorly and had been handcuffed in a stress position; he added that he was forced to sign a document, giving up his right to legal representation and that he was forced to do an interview at 4 a.m. The Australian Department of Foreign Affairs and Trade said that they "will raise Mr. Pavlou's claim that he was denied consular access before being released with UK authorities." Alan Crockford, spokesman for the Metropolitan Police denied allegations of poor treatment during Pavlou's detainment, and asserted that the department abides to "strict codes of practice under the Police and Criminal Evidence Act" for detainees. Some human rights activists and politicians, also claimed of receiving emails from accounts that were pretending to be Pavlou. Pavlou claimed he was subjected to an "orchestrated campaign".

Pavlou returned to Australia in August 2022 after his bail conditions were altered to permit this. He had denied sending the email and said he had been framed. He was released without charge, and in February 2023 the Metropolitan Police told media he had been cleared of wrongdoing.

=== Relationship with Amnesty International Australia ===
In 2022, Amnesty International Australia publicly urged the Australian government to assist Pavlou and protect his rights after he was arrested in London following a human-rights protest, citing concerns about his treatment while detained. However, Amnesty International Australia expelled him from membership in August 2023, citing a "serious breach" of its terms of membership in relation to "his behaviour at the AGM and subsequently on social media". He criticised the organisation in an interview with Sky News Australia, describing it as having an "anti-Western" bias.

=== 2026 arrest ===
On 4 January 2026, Pavlou was arrested for breach of the peace during a protest at Sydney Town Hall against Western intervention in Venezuela. Video of the incident showed Pavlou chanting "USA" as he was arrested. He was later released without charge. Pavlou stated that he had been present as a counter-protester and was arrested for "holding an anti-Communist sign".

=== Denial of entry to the United States ===
In February 2026, Pavlou was described by news.com.au as "a rising figure on the American right", after he announced that he was planning to move into Billie Eilish's home in Los Angeles "because no human being is illegal on stolen land" – echoing Eilish's words in her speech at the 68th Annual Grammy Awards, where she took aim at ICE raids in the United States. He raised $4,500 through crowdfunding to travel to the United States. Pavlou told news.com.au he would not do "anything illegal" and intended to stay in a hotel after Eilish's staff turned him away.

On 15 February 2026, Pavlou was denied entry at Los Angeles International Airport. He posted on social media that he had been held at the airport for 30 hours, and blamed Eilish for what he called a "deportation", (Note: There is a difference in law between denial of entry and deportation.) saying that his post had been "a joke". After returning to Australia, Pavlou refused to abandon such 'pranks', stating "I will always be annoying".

== Political career ==
Pavlou joined Katter's Australian Party (KAP) in 2020, having previously been a member of the Australian Labor Party in 2019, and the Australian Greens from 2019 to 2020.

In 2021, Pavlou sought preselection to run for the Senate for KAP at the 2022 federal election, but his bid was voted down four to three by the party hierarchy. Pavlou accused One Nation politician Pauline Hanson and James Ashby of "killing" his political career by intervening in his preselection attempt, maintaining that Ashby said the peaceful relationship between One Nation and KAP would end if Pavlou won preselection. Ashby denied these claims. KAP president Chris Carney stated that Pavlou's candidacy was rejected due to his residence in Brisbane, while the party primarily focuses on North Queensland.

=== Drew Pavlou Democratic Alliance ===
Drew Pavlou Democratic Alliance
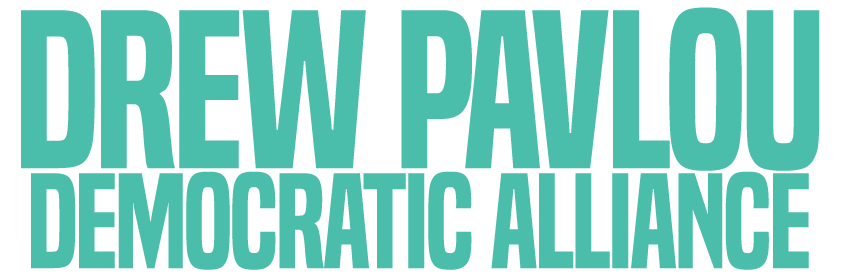
- Abbreviation: DPDA; Democratic Alliance
- Leader: Drew Pavlou
- Founded: 21 September 2021; 5 years ago
- Dissolved: 6 November 2023; 3 years ago
- Ideology: Anti-communism; Anti-PRC sentiment; Anti-corruption

Website
- Official website at the Wayback Machine (archived 23 May 2022)

In September 2021, Pavlou launched the Drew Pavlou Democratic Alliance (DPDA) political party. He announced his intention to run for the Senate in Queensland, alongside five other candidates in New South Wales, South Australia and Queensland. Candidates included people of Uyghur, Tibetan and Hong Kong background. The party was registered with the Australian Electoral Commission (AEC) on 28 February 2022.

The party's self-stated policies included fighting corruption, protecting human rights (with an eye specifically on alleged issues related to the Chinese Communist Party and promoting a pro-Taiwan foreign policy), tackling poverty and homelessness, building a green economy, and supporting workplace democracy.

The party contested the 2022 Australian federal election, with Pavlou running for the Australian Senate in his home state of Queensland. Investment manager Simon Fenwick donated $25,000 to Pavlou's campaign. The Democratic Alliance ran a targeted campaign against Chinese-Australian Liberal MP Gladys Liu, critcising her alleged ties to the CCP. During the campaign, Pavlou posed beside Liu in a khaki Cultural Revolution uniform, and claimed that she was a Chinese spy and Xi Jinping's preferred candidate. Such stunts were criticised by Liberal MP James Paterson and Erin Wen Ai Chew of the Asian-Australian Alliance for personally attacking Liu, with Pavlou later admitting that it "went too far with the tone we used."

At the 2022 election, the party did not win any seats. Its candidates received 2,215 first preference votes for the House of Representatives nationally (contesting Bennelong and Sturt), 4,555 first preference votes for the Senate in Queensland (representing 0.15% of total votes cast), and 1,011 first preference votes for the Senate in South Australia (representing 0.09% of total votes cast).

The party was voluntarily de-registered on 6 November 2023.

== Views ==
Pavlou formerly identified as "very left-wing", but since 2025 his views have shifted towards the right. He has been described as right-wing to far-right.

In 2026, The Nightly reported that Pavlou is "an enthusiastic member" of the MAGA movement that is associated with US President Donald Trump. After the 2026 United States elections, in which the Republican Party performed worse than expected, Pavlou stated that he "committed social suicide" by supporting the Republicans and right-wing politics.

=== China ===
Pavlou is most notable for his stance against the CCP. He supports withdrawing diplomatic recognition of the People's Republic of China and instead recognising Taiwan. Pavlou denies being anti-Chinese, stating that he is against the Chinese government rather than Chinese people.

He has been accused of stoking ethnic divisions against Chinese individuals on social media, such as by linguist Gerald Roche. In 2020, Roche filed a complaint to UQ against Pavlou for tweeting that he would give the head of the UQ Confucius Institute a "mental breakdown", and later mocking Chinese students' English skills. In March 2020, Pavlou posed in front of the UQ Confucius Institue in a biohazard suit, which Roche argued "portrayed Asians as a source of disease". Joshua Brannon of Honi Soit contends that Pavlou's anti-China activism utilises orientalist tropes and stereotypes, and that Pavlou's Confucius Institute stunt invoked the Yellow Peril. Following Pavlou's suspension from UQ in May 2020, the Chinese state-run newspaper Global Times alleged that Pavlou had "often" posted hate speech and offensive comments against Chinese students on Facebook.

In June 2021, Pavlou was temporarily banned from Facebook for making anti-China comments.

In a July 2025 podcast with American white supremacist Richard B. Spencer, Pavlou expressed concern over the potential "Finlandisation" of Australia's foreign policy in regards to China.

In August 2025, Pavlou released a video in which he walked around Melbourne CBD counting the numbers of bubble tea shops and Chinese real estate firms in Chinatown, referring to the "yookayification" of Australia, a term used by the British far-right to describe the supposed decline of the United Kingdom due to immigration. In the video, he falsely indicated that the firms "exclude" English speakers. Many of the firms featured in the video disputed this implication, and noted that they offer services and advertising material in Chinese, English, and other languages. Furthermore, the video was filmed in Chinatown, an area with a historic Chinese presence.

In October 2026, Pavlou dismissed anti-Chinese massacres that occurred during the Indonesian mass killings of 1965–66 as a "communist myth". According to historian Jess Melvin, many Chinese Indonesians were targeted and killed during 1965–1966 due to a combination of ethnic violence and purported links to the Communist Party of Indonesia.

=== Islam ===
Pavlou is critical of Islamic extremism, and has frequently criticised radical Muslims on Twitter. He has likened Islamism to fascism.

Avatar of Drew Pavlou

Drew Pavlou
(@DrewPavlou)
tweeted:

Reports that Islamists set off celebratory fireworks in Bankstown, Western Sydney

14 December 2025

Pavlou was one of several social media influencers who amplified the false claim that Islamists in Western Sydney set off fireworks in celebration of the 2025 Bondi Beach shooting. The fireworks were planned weeks in advance for an annual 'Carols by Candlelight' celebration, and were not in response to the shooting. After deleting his initial post about the fireworks, Pavlou asserted "there is a track record of this behaviour".

In January 2026, Pavlou claimed that Muslim extremists will be exempt from the Albanese government's hate speech laws, as long as they quote the Qur'an directly.

=== Immigration ===
Pavlou frequently comments on immigration on his social media and self-identifies as a "Western civilisation enjoyer" on X.

In August 2025, Pavlou expressed support for the anti-immigrant March for Australia rally, whose organisers were found to be linked to white nationalist and neo-Nazi groups like the National Socialist Network.

In August 2025, Pavlou hosted an online debate on Australian identity, expressing concern about voting patterns of Indians in Australian politics. He said he was "really concerned for the future of the country if we get these sectarian voting blocs", in response to claims that Indians overwhelmingly voted for the Labor Party in the 2025 Australian federal election.

In October 2025, when Bad Bunny was chosen to perform as the headliner at the 2026 Super Bowl halftime show, Pavlou called it "a slap in the face" to American identity. He also said that white liberals who supported Bad Bunny performing in Spanish were "cheer[ing] over the replacement of their own culture".

In October 2025, Pavlou stated that he opposes accepting asylum seekers, except for Ukrainians and Hong Kongers.

On 15 December 2025, Pavlou participated in a podcast about perceived mass immigration with Patrick Casey, a former leader of the neo-Nazi Identity Evropa group.

In March 2026, Pavlou lobbied for Australia to give asylum to the Iran women's national football team who defected. In a Twitter post, he claimed that the Albanese government waited until the last possible moment to grant the Iranian footballers asylum. The post later received attention from Trump, who reshared it on social media and called Anthony Albanese early in the morning to discuss the issue. However, Pavlou acknowledged that the Iranian footballers were already intended to be granted visas by the government long before Trump's phone call to Albanese.

=== Israel ===
Since the October 7 attacks in 2023, Pavlou has been a supporter of Israel. In an article from Israel National News, Pavlou stated he was a "soft Palestine supporter" before the October 7 attacks, but since then he opposes a two-state solution.

In October 2024, Pavlou discussed the Israel–Palestine conflict on a podcast with far-right provocateur Avi Yemini. In the podcast, Pavlou argued that Israel is not a settler colonial state because of the ethnic cleansing of Jews in the Arab world in the 1950s.

=== Anti-communism ===
Pavlou is an anti-communist. He has said that he would like to "round up communists" and endorsed the "Jakarta Method", referring to targeted massacres against suspected communists that occurred during the 1965–1966 Indonesian mass killings.

During the 2026 French civil unrest, Pavlou tweeted that communists involved in the protests "should be shot".

== Personal life ==
In 2023, he was diagnosed with attention deficit hyperactivity disorder.
