= Electoral results for the Division of Higgins =

Australian division election results

This is a list of electoral results for the Division of Higgins in Australian federal elections from the division's creation in 1949 until its abolition in 2025.

== Members ==
Member	Party	Term
Harold Holt	Liberal	1949–1967
John Gorton	Liberal	1968–1975
John Gorton	Independent	1975–1975
Roger Shipton	Liberal	1975–1990
Peter Costello	Liberal	1990–2009
Kelly O'Dwyer	Liberal	2009–2019
Katie Allen	Liberal	2019–2022
Michelle Ananda-Rajah	Labor	2022–2025

== Election results ==
=== Elections in the 2020s ===
==== 2022 ====
2022 Australian federal election: Higgins
Party	Candidate	Votes	%	±%
Liberal	Katie Allen	38,859	40.69	−5.84
Labor	Michelle Ananda-Rajah	27,187	28.46	+2.39
Greens	Sonya Semmens	21,632	22.65	−0.06
Liberal Democrats	Matthew Ford	2,648	2.77	+2.77
United Australia	Ingram Spencer	1,917	2.01	+0.84
Reason	Andrew Johnson	1,458	1.53	+1.53
Animal Justice	Alicia Walker	1,295	1.36	−0.40
Federation	Suzie Menoudakis	515	0.54	+0.54
Total formal votes		95,511	97.18	−0.31
Informal votes		2,774	2.82	+0.31
Turnout		98,285	91.23	−2.45
Two-party-preferred result
Labor	Michelle Ananda-Rajah	49,726	52.06	+4.67
Liberal	Katie Allen	45,785	47.94	−4.67
Labor gain from Liberal		Swing	+4.67	

Alluvial diagram for preference flows in the seat of Higgins in the 2022 federal election. indicates at what stage the winning candidate had over 50% of the votes and was declared the winner.

=== Elections in the 2010s ===
==== 2019 ====
2019 Australian federal election: Higgins
Party	Candidate	Votes	%	±%
Liberal	Katie Allen	48,091	47.86	−3.72
Labor	Fiona McLeod	25,498	25.38	+8.85
Greens	Jason Ball	22,573	22.47	−1.72
Animal Justice	Alicia Walker	1,729	1.72	+0.15
Sustainable Australia	Michaela Moran	1,338	1.33	+1.33
United Australia	Tim Ryan	1,249	1.24	+1.24
Total formal votes		100,478	97.99	+1.74
Informal votes		2,063	2.01	−1.74
Turnout		102,541	92.37	+1.49
Two-party-preferred result
Liberal	Katie Allen	54,139	53.88	−6.09
Labor	Fiona McLeod	46,339	46.12	+6.09
Liberal hold		Swing	−6.09	

==== 2016 ====
2016 Australian federal election: Higgins
Party	Candidate	Votes	%	±%
Liberal	Kelly O'Dwyer	46,953	52.00	−2.37
Greens	Jason Ball	22,870	25.33	+8.53
Labor	Carl Katter	13,495	14.95	−9.13
Xenophon	Nancy Bassett	2,007	2.22	+2.22
Animal Justice	Eleonora Gullone	1,344	1.49	+1.49
Marriage Equality	Rebecca O'Brien	1,265	1.40	+1.40
Justice	Jessica Tregear	1,264	1.40	+1.40
Liberal Democrats	Robert Kennedy	1,093	1.21	+1.21
Total formal votes		90,291	96.22	−0.20
Informal votes		3,550	3.78	+0.20
Turnout		93,841	89.65	−2.36
Notional two-party-preferred count
Liberal	Kelly O'Dwyer	54,798	60.69	+0.76
Labor	Carl Katter	35,493	39.31	–0.76
Two-candidate-preferred result
Liberal	Kelly O'Dwyer	52,359	57.99	–1.94
Greens	Jason Ball	37,932	42.01	+42.01
Liberal hold		Swing	N/A	

==== 2013 ====
2013 Australian federal election: Higgins
Party	Candidate	Votes	%	±%
Liberal	Kelly O'Dwyer	47,467	54.37	+3.89
Labor	Wesa Chau	21,027	24.08	−5.22
Greens	James Harrison	14,669	16.80	−0.97
Independent	Graeme Weber	1,663	1.90	+1.90
Palmer United	Phillip Dall	1,385	1.59	+1.59
Family First	Jamie Baldwin	742	0.85	−0.19
Rise Up Australia	Leanne Price	354	0.41	+0.41
Total formal votes		87,307	96.42	−0.68
Informal votes		3,239	3.58	+0.68
Turnout		90,546	91.97	−1.89
Two-party-preferred result
Liberal	Kelly O'Dwyer	52,323	59.93	+4.53
Labor	Wesa Chau	34,984	40.07	−4.53
Liberal hold		Swing	+4.53	

==== 2010 ====
2010 Australian federal election: Higgins
Party	Candidate	Votes	%	±%
Liberal	Kelly O'Dwyer	42,086	51.74	−1.87
Labor	Tony Clark	22,700	27.91	−3.17
Greens	Sam Hibbins	14,559	17.90	+7.15
Independent	David Fawcett	1,225	1.51	+1.51
Family First	Ashley Truter	777	0.96	+0.19
Total formal votes		81,347	97.20	−0.23
Informal votes		2,343	2.80	+0.23
Turnout		83,690	92.58	−1.19
Two-party-preferred result
Liberal	Kelly O'Dwyer	46,167	56.75	−0.29
Labor	Tony Clark	35,180	43.25	+0.29
Liberal hold		Swing	−0.29	

=== Elections in the 2000s ===
==== 2009 by-election ====
2009 Higgins by-election
Party	Candidate	Votes	%	±%
Liberal	Kelly O'Dwyer	36,421	54.57	+0.96
Greens	Clive Hamilton	21,628	32.40	+21.65
Democratic Labour	John Mulholland	2,572	3.85	+3.85
Sex Party	Fiona Patten	2,144	3.21	+3.21
Democrats	David Collyer	1,531	2.29	+1.08
Ind. Climate Sceptics	Stephen Murphy	1,145	1.72	+1.72
Independent	Joseph Toscano	523	0.78	+0.78
Liberal Democrats	Isaac Roberts	336	0.50	+0.50
Independent	Peter Brohier	236	0.35	+0.35
One Nation	Steve Raskovy	211	0.32	+0.32
Total formal votes		66,747	95.85	−1.58
Informal votes		2,870	4.15	+1.58
Turnout		69,637	79.00	−14.77
Two-candidate-preferred result
Liberal	Kelly O'Dwyer	40,203	60.23	+3.19
Greens	Clive Hamilton	26,544	39.77	+39.77
Liberal hold		Swing	N/A	

==== 2007 ====
2007 Australian federal election: Higgins
Party	Candidate	Votes	%	±%
Liberal	Peter Costello	43,761	53.61	−1.69
Labor	Barbara Norman	25,367	31.08	+0.58
Greens	Michael Wilbur-Ham	8,777	10.75	−0.60
Independent	Stephen Mayne	1,615	1.98	+1.98
Democrats	Mary Dettman	990	1.21	−0.61
Family First	Penny Badwal	627	0.77	−0.06
Independent	Genevieve Maria Forde	265	0.32	+0.32
Independent	Graeme Meddings	227	0.28	+0.28
Total formal votes		81,629	97.43	+0.19
Informal votes		2,150	2.57	−0.19
Turnout		83,779	93.78	+0.81
Two-party-preferred result
Liberal	Peter Costello	46,559	57.04	−1.72
Labor	Barbara Norman	35,070	42.96	+1.72
Liberal hold		Swing	−1.72	

==== 2004 ====
2004 Australian federal election: Higgins
Party	Candidate	Votes	%	±%
Liberal	Peter Costello	43,739	55.20	+2.01
Labor	Paul Klisaris	24,166	30.50	+1.62
Greens	Robert Trafficante	8,993	11.35	+2.54
Democrats	Adam McBeth	1,440	1.82	−7.30
Family First	Glen Pringle	658	0.83	+0.83
Citizens Electoral Council	Katherine Reid	243	0.31	+0.31
Total formal votes		79,239	97.24	−0.08
Informal votes		2,247	2.76	+0.08
Turnout		81,486	92.97	−1.11
Two-party-preferred result
Liberal	Peter Costello	46,561	58.76	+0.37
Labor	Paul Klisaris	32,678	41.24	−0.37
Liberal hold		Swing	+0.37	

==== 2001 ====
2001 Australian federal election: Higgins
Party	Candidate	Votes	%	±%
Liberal	Peter Costello	42,437	53.19	−0.25
Labor	Katie Stephens	23,038	28.88	−3.24
Democrats	Katie Moss	7,275	9.12	+1.66
Greens	Tania Giles	7,029	8.81	+6.03
Total formal votes		79,779	97.32	+0.33
Informal votes		2,198	2.68	−0.33
Turnout		81,977	93.47	
Two-party-preferred result
Liberal	Peter Costello	46,583	58.39	−1.23
Labor	Katie Stephens	33,196	41.61	+1.23
Liberal hold		Swing	−1.23	

=== Elections in the 1990s ===
==== 1998 ====
1998 Australian federal election: Higgins
Party	Candidate	Votes	%	±%
Liberal	Peter Costello	41,353	53.44	−2.36
Labor	Jude Wallace	24,852	32.12	+1.60
Democrats	Craig Shaw	5,770	7.46	−1.68
Greens	Robert Trafficante	2,155	2.78	−1.13
One Nation	Rod Spencer	1,208	1.56	+1.56
Unity	David Zyngier	1,031	1.33	+1.33
Independent	Ian Lawson	584	0.75	+0.75
Natural Law	Michael Dickins	205	0.26	−0.37
Independent	Russell Dwyer	128	0.17	+0.17
Abolish Child Support	President Torney	93	0.12	+0.12
Total formal votes		77,379	96.99	−0.99
Informal votes		2,403	3.01	+0.99
Turnout		79,782	94.08	−0.95
Two-party-preferred result
Liberal	Peter Costello	46,133	59.62	−1.11
Labor	Jude Wallace	31,246	40.38	+1.11
Liberal hold		Swing	−1.11	

==== 1996 ====
1996 Australian federal election: Higgins
Party	Candidate	Votes	%	±%
Liberal	Peter Costello	42,778	55.80	−0.54
Labor	Ilias Grivas	23,392	30.52	−5.25
Democrats	Nicolle Kuna	7,002	9.13	+3.68
Greens	Mark Nicholls	2,995	3.91	+3.91
Natural Law	Lorna Scurfield	490	0.64	−1.71
Total formal votes		76,657	97.98	+0.52
Informal votes		1,579	2.02	−0.52
Turnout		78,236	95.03	−0.06
Two-party-preferred result
Liberal	Peter Costello	46,188	60.73	+1.44
Labor	Ilias Grivas	29,862	39.27	−1.44
Liberal hold		Swing	+1.44	

==== 1993 ====
1993 Australian federal election: Higgins
Party	Candidate	Votes	%	±%
Liberal	Peter Costello	41,501	57.36	+1.08
Labor	Joe Cerritelli	25,077	34.66	+7.69
Democrats	Clive Jackson	4,040	5.58	−10.20
Natural Law	Lesley Mendelson	1,740	2.40	+2.40
Total formal votes		72,358	97.50	+0.50
Informal votes		1,852	2.50	−0.50
Turnout		74,210	95.09	
Two-party-preferred result
Liberal	Peter Costello	43,491	60.13	−1.69
Labor	Joe Cerritelli	28,832	39.87	+1.69
Liberal hold		Swing	−1.69	

==== 1990 ====
1990 Australian federal election: Higgins
Party	Candidate	Votes	%	±%
Liberal	Peter Costello	38,594	56.3	+2.2
Labor	Laurie Walsh	18,497	27.0	−10.4
Democrats	Clive Jackson	10,826	15.8	+7.3
Call to Australia	Neil Baluch	670	1.0	+1.0
Total formal votes		68,587	97.0	
Informal votes		2,116	3.0	
Turnout		70,703	94.4	
Two-party-preferred result
Liberal	Peter Costello	42,323	61.8	+4.0
Labor	Laurie Walsh	26,131	38.2	−4.0
Liberal hold		Swing	+4.0	

=== Elections in the 1980s ===
==== 1987 ====
1987 Australian federal election: Higgins
Party	Candidate	Votes	%	±%
Liberal	Roger Shipton	36,139	59.0	+2.0
Labor	Barbara Higgins	19,899	32.5	−0.9
Democrats	Clive Jackson	5,188	8.5	+2.7
Total formal votes		61,226	95.9	
Informal votes		2,606	4.1	
Turnout		63,832	93.4	
Two-party-preferred result
Liberal	Roger Shipton	38,328	62.6	+0.5
Labor	Barbara Higgins	22,888	37.4	−0.5
Liberal hold		Swing	+0.5	

==== 1984 ====
1984 Australian federal election: Higgins
Party	Candidate	Votes	%	±%
Liberal	Roger Shipton	35,062	57.0	+1.0
Labor	Kenneth Penaluna	20,543	33.4	−3.7
Democrats	Laurence Levy	3,570	5.8	−0.3
National	Babette Francis	1,600	2.6	+2.6
Democratic Labor	Robert Semmel	692	1.1	+1.1
Total formal votes		61,467	93.3	
Informal votes		4,391	6.7	
Turnout		65,858	93.5	
Two-party-preferred result
Liberal	Roger Shipton	38,140	62.1	+3.3
Labor	Kenneth Penaluna	23,312	37.9	−3.3
Liberal hold		Swing	+3.3	

==== 1983 ====
1983 Australian federal election: Higgins
Party	Candidate	Votes	%	±%
Liberal	Roger Shipton	35,189	55.2	−1.8
Labor	Jennifer Bundy	24,184	37.9	+3.5
Democrats	Antony Siddons	3,880	6.1	−0.9
Imperial British	Maureen Holmes	500	0.8	−0.2
Total formal votes		63,753	98.4	
Informal votes		1,024	1.6	
Turnout		64,777	94.8	
Two-party-preferred result
Liberal	Roger Shipton		58.0	−2.7
Labor	Jennifer Bundy		42.0	+2.7
Liberal hold		Swing	−2.7	

==== 1980 ====
1980 Australian federal election: Higgins
Party	Candidate	Votes	%	±%
Liberal	Roger Shipton	37,292	57.0	+1.8
Labor	Jennifer Bundy	22,512	34.4	+8.2
Democrats	James Thornley	4,554	7.0	−5.5
Imperial British	Maureen Holmes	636	1.0	+1.0
Independent	Wilhelm Kapphan	437	0.7	+0.7
Total formal votes		65,431	97.9	
Informal votes		1,412	2.1	
Turnout		66,843	93.4	
Two-party-preferred result
Liberal	Roger Shipton		60.7	−5.3
Labor	Jennifer Bundy		39.3	+5.3
Liberal hold		Swing	−5.3	

=== Elections in the 1970s ===
==== 1977 ====
1977 Australian federal election: Higgins
Party	Candidate	Votes	%	±%
Liberal	Roger Shipton	36,504	55.2	−5.5
Labor	Ann Jackson	17,308	26.2	−6.4
Democrats	Jim Thornley	8,292	12.5	+12.5
Democratic Labor	Martin Cahill	3,998	6.0	+1.2
Total formal votes		66,102	97.8	
Informal votes		1,481	2.2	
Turnout		67,583	94.5	
Two-party-preferred result
Liberal	Roger Shipton		66.0	+1.1
Labor	Ann Jackson		34.0	−1.1
Liberal hold		Swing	+1.1	

==== 1975 ====
1975 Australian federal election: Higgins
Party	Candidate	Votes	%	±%
Liberal	Roger Shipton	35,577	60.7	+2.1
Labor	Andrew Homer	19,134	32.6	−2.3
Democratic Labor	John Cotter	2,833	4.8	+1.3
Australia	Rafe Slaney	1,091	1.9	−1.2
Total formal votes		58,635	98.3	
Informal votes		1,027	1.7	
Turnout		59,662	94.0	
Two-party-preferred result
Liberal	Roger Shipton		64.9	+1.9
Labor	Andrew Homer		35.1	−1.9
Liberal hold		Swing	+1.9	

==== 1974 ====
1974 Australian federal election: Higgins
Party	Candidate	Votes	%	±%
Liberal	John Gorton	34,640	58.6	+5.2
Labor	Wilhelm Kapphan	20,614	34.9	−0.4
Democratic Labor	Thomas Magree	2,048	3.5	−2.2
Australia	Rafe Slaney	1,809	3.1	−2.5
Total formal votes		59,111	98.2	
Informal votes		1,079	1.8	
Turnout		60,190	94.8	
Two-party-preferred result
Liberal	John Gorton		63.0	+2.2
Labor	Wilhelm Kapphan		37.0	−2.2
Liberal hold		Swing	+2.2	

==== 1972 ====
1972 Australian federal election: Higgins
Party	Candidate	Votes	%	±%
Liberal	John Gorton	29,335	53.4	−5.1
Labor	David Hardy	19,362	35.3	+6.5
Democratic Labor	Peter Grant	3,142	5.7	−2.4
Australia	Jack Hammond	3,069	5.6	+2.5
Total formal votes		54,908	98.1	
Informal votes		1,055	1.9	
Turnout		55,963	94.3	
Two-party-preferred result
Liberal	John Gorton		60.8	−7.0
Labor	David Hardy		39.2	+7.0
Liberal hold		Swing	−7.0	

=== Elections in the 1960s ===
==== 1969 ====
1969 Australian federal election: Higgins
Party	Candidate	Votes	%	±%
Liberal	John Gorton	30,191	58.5	−3.3
Labor	Wilhelm Kapphan	14,868	28.8	+2.1
Democratic Labor	Peter Grant	4,208	8.1	−3.5
Australia	Walter Pickering	1,598	3.1	+3.1
Independent	Morris Revelman	777	1.5	+1.5
Total formal votes		51,642	96.8	
Informal votes		1,715	3.2	
Turnout		53,357	91.3	
Two-party-preferred result
Liberal	John Gorton		67.8	−4.4
Labor	Wilhelm Kapphan		32.2	+4.4
Liberal hold		Swing	−4.4	

==== 1968 by-election ====
1968 Higgins by-election
Party	Candidate	Votes	%	±%
Liberal	John Gorton	24,067	69.40	+6.12
Labor	David Bennett	9,601	27.69	+2.53
Reform Movement	Leonard Weber	662	1.91	+1.91
Independent	Frank Courtis	347	1.00	+1.00
Total formal votes		34,677	98.63	+1.39
Informal votes		481	1.37	–1.39
Turnout		35,158	84.87	–9.45
Liberal hold		Swing	+6.12	

==== 1966 ====
1966 Australian federal election: Higgins
Party	Candidate	Votes	%	±%
Liberal	Harold Holt	23,918	63.3	+3.2
Labor	Bruce Phayer	9,510	25.2	−3.5
Democratic Labor	Frederick Skinner	4,370	11.6	+0.5
Total formal votes		37,798	97.2	
Informal votes		1,072	2.8	
Turnout		38,870	94.3	
Two-party-preferred result
Liberal	Harold Holt		73.7	+3.6
Labor	Bruce Phayer		26.3	−3.6
Liberal hold		Swing	+3.6	

==== 1963 ====
1963 Australian federal election: Higgins
Party	Candidate	Votes	%	±%
Liberal	Harold Holt	22,835	60.1	+3.4
Labor	Roger Kirby	10,915	28.7	−0.6
Democratic Labor	Celia Laird	4,223	11.1	−2.9
Total formal votes		37,973	98.8	
Informal votes		444	1.2	
Turnout		38,417	95.1	
Two-party-preferred result
Liberal	Harold Holt		70.1	+0.8
Labor	Roger Kirby		29.9	−0.8
Liberal hold		Swing	+0.8	

==== 1961 ====
1961 Australian federal election: Higgins
Party	Candidate	Votes	%	±%
Liberal	Harold Holt	22,004	56.7	−6.5
Labor	Roger Kirby	11,353	29.3	+4.6
Democratic Labor	Celia Laird	5,428	14.0	+1.9
Total formal votes		38,785	98.1	
Informal votes		753	1.9	
Turnout		39,538	96.4	
Two-party-preferred result
Liberal	Harold Holt		69.3	−4.8
Labor	Roger Kirby		30.7	+4.8
Liberal hold		Swing	−4.8	

=== Elections in the 1950s ===
==== 1958 ====
1958 Australian federal election: Higgins
Party	Candidate	Votes	%	±%
Liberal	Harold Holt	24,486	63.2	−1.2
Labor	Alfred Shiff	9,564	24.7	+2.6
Democratic Labor	Celia Laird	4,701	12.1	−1.4
Total formal votes		38,751	97.9	
Informal votes		839	2.1	
Turnout		39,590	93.5	
Two-party-preferred result
Liberal	Harold Holt		74.1	−1.3
Labor	Alfred Shiff		25.9	+1.3
Liberal hold		Swing	−1.3	

==== 1955 ====
1955 Australian federal election: Higgins
Party	Candidate	Votes	%	±%
Liberal	Harold Holt	25,476	64.4	+0.2
Labor	Andrew Hughes	8,752	22.1	−12.5
Labor (A-C)	John Fitzgerald	5,331	13.5	+13.5
Total formal votes		39,559	97.5	
Informal votes		1,000	2.5	
Turnout		40,559	93.0	
Two-party-preferred result
Liberal	Harold Holt	29,827	75.4	+10.7
Labor	Andrew Hughes	9,732	24.6	−10.7
Liberal hold		Swing	+10.7	

==== 1954 ====
1954 Australian federal election: Higgins
Party	Candidate	Votes	%	±%
Liberal	Harold Holt	22,849	65.4	−1.0
Labor	Benjamin Nicholas	12,108	34.6	+4.1
Total formal votes		34,957	98.8	
Informal votes		407	1.2	
Turnout		35,364	93.8	
Liberal hold		Swing	−2.8	

==== 1951 ====
1951 Australian federal election: Higgins
Party	Candidate	Votes	%	±%
Liberal	Harold Holt	24,217	64.4	−2.4
Labor	Benjamin Nicholas	11,490	30.5	−2.7
Independent	Mary Kent Hughes	1,925	5.1	+5.1
Total formal votes		37,632	98.5	
Informal votes		584	1.5	
Turnout		38,216	94.2	
Two-party-preferred result
Liberal	Harold Holt		68.2	+1.4
Labor	Benjamin Nicholas		31.8	−1.4
Liberal hold		Swing	+1.4	

=== Elections in the 1940s ===
==== 1949 ====
1949 Australian federal election: Higgins
Party	Candidate	Votes	%	±%
Liberal	Harold Holt	26,018	66.8	+6.8
Labor	Jules Meltzer	12,909	33.2	−3.7
Total formal votes		38,927	98.4	
Informal votes		621	1.6	
Turnout		39,548	94.7	
Liberal notional hold		Swing	+5.4	
