= Results of the 2016 Australian federal election in Victoria =

2016 Australian federal election (Victoria)
- 2 July 2016

All 37 Victorian seats in the Australian House of Representatives and all 12 seats in the Australian Senate
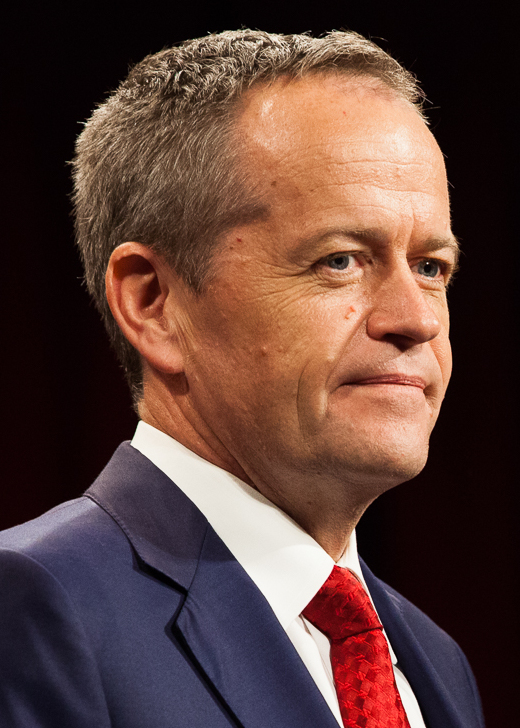

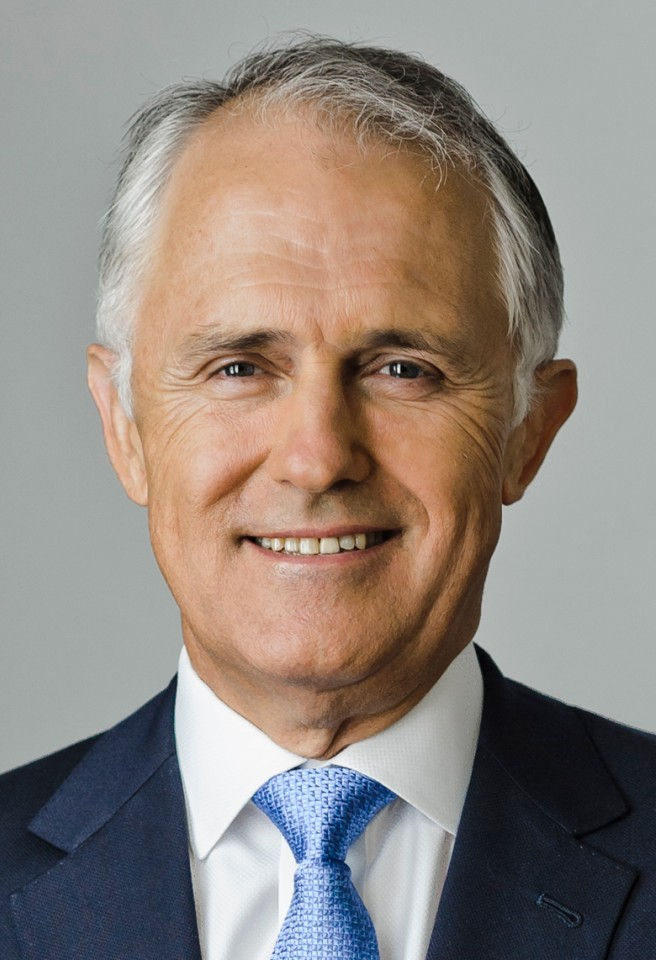

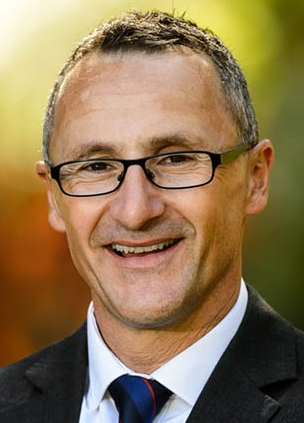
	First party	Second party	Third party
Leader	Bill Shorten	Malcolm Turnbull	Richard Di Natale
Party	Labor	Liberal/National coalition	Greens
Last election	19 seats	16 seats	1 seat
Seats won	18 seats	17 seats	1 seat
Seat change	▼1	▲1	Steady
Popular vote	1,224,051	1,436,933	451,700
Percentage	35.58%	41.76%	13.13%
Swing	▲0.77	▼0.93	▲2.33
TPP	51.83%	48.17%
TPP swing	▲1.63	▼1.63
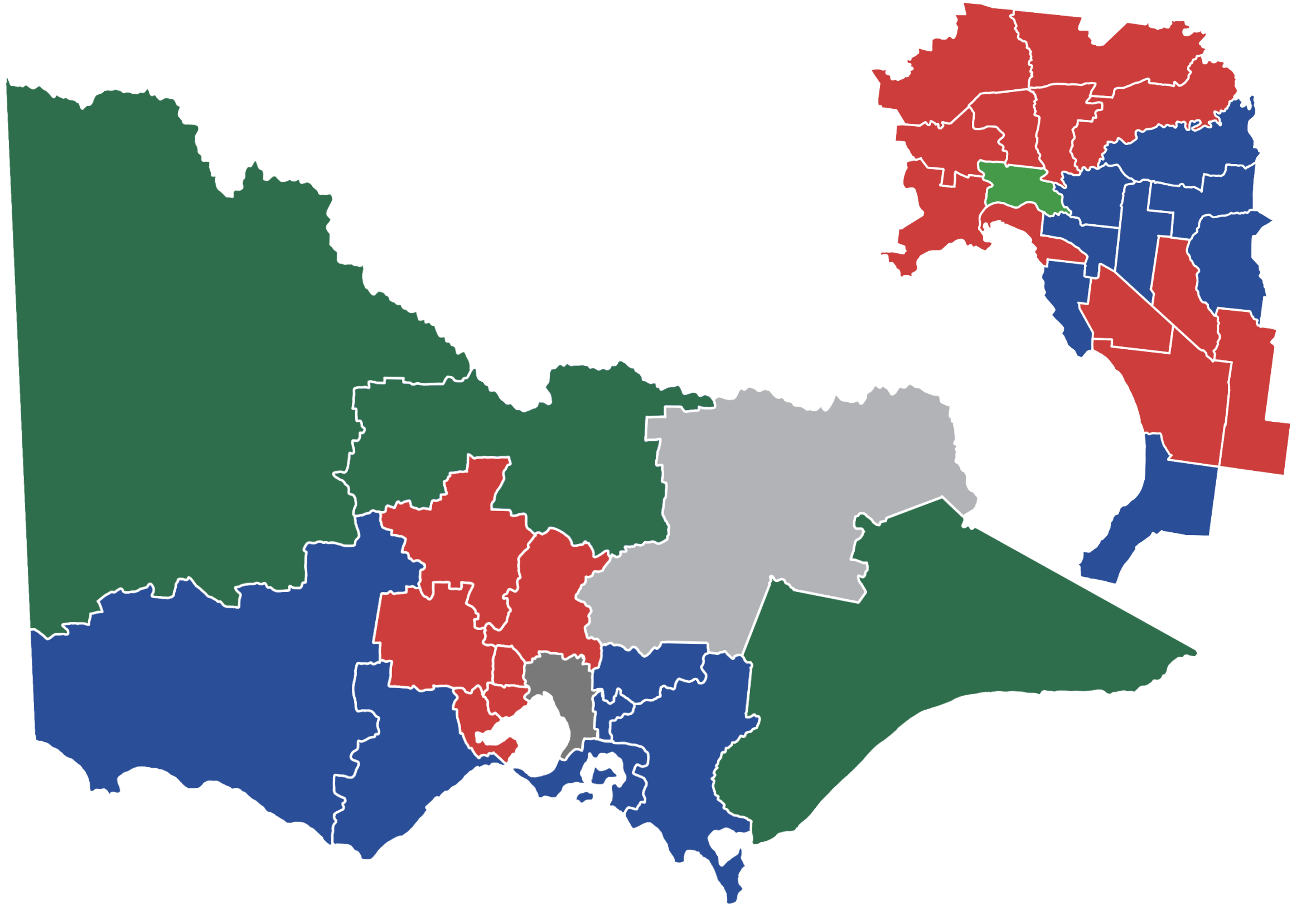
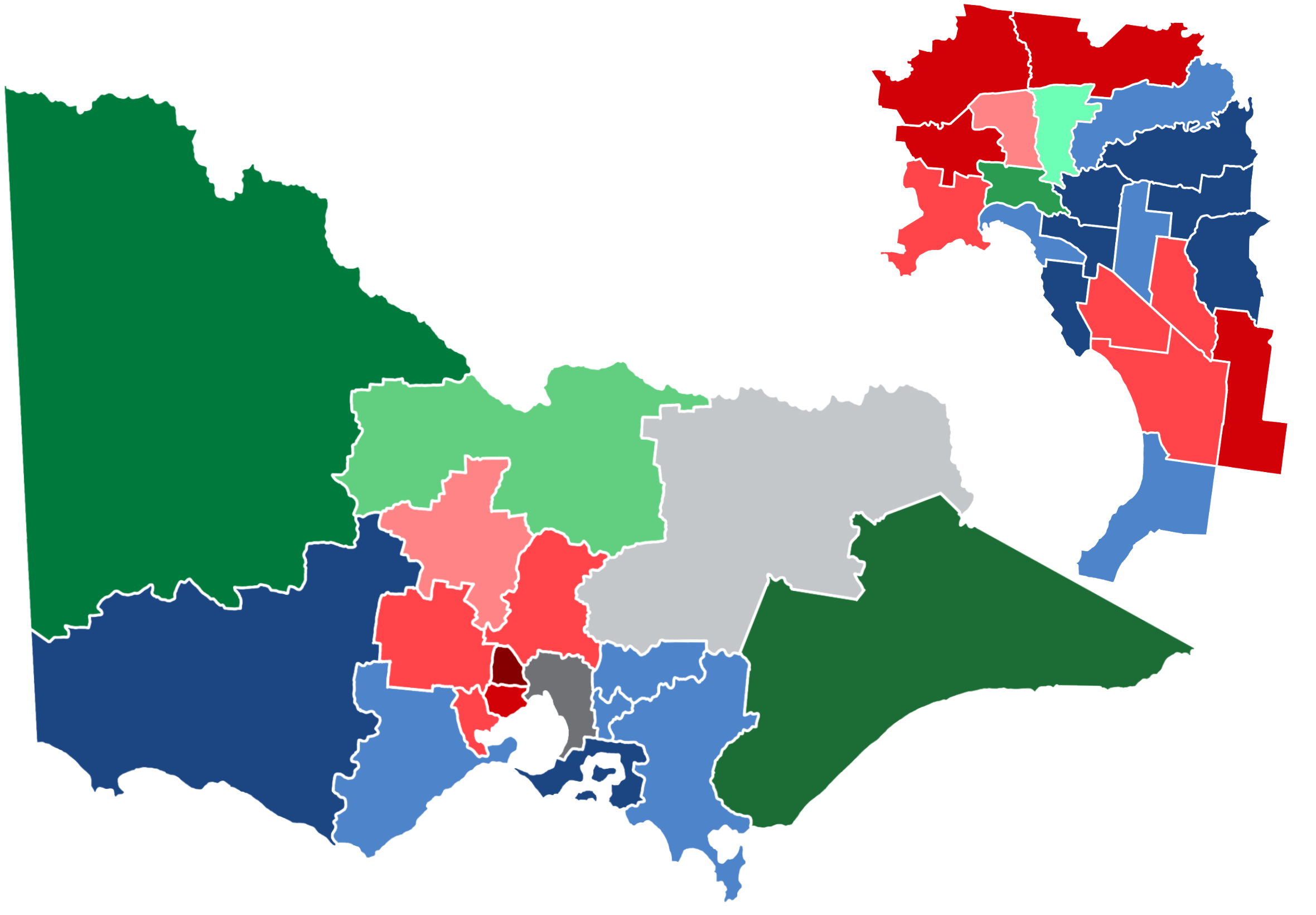
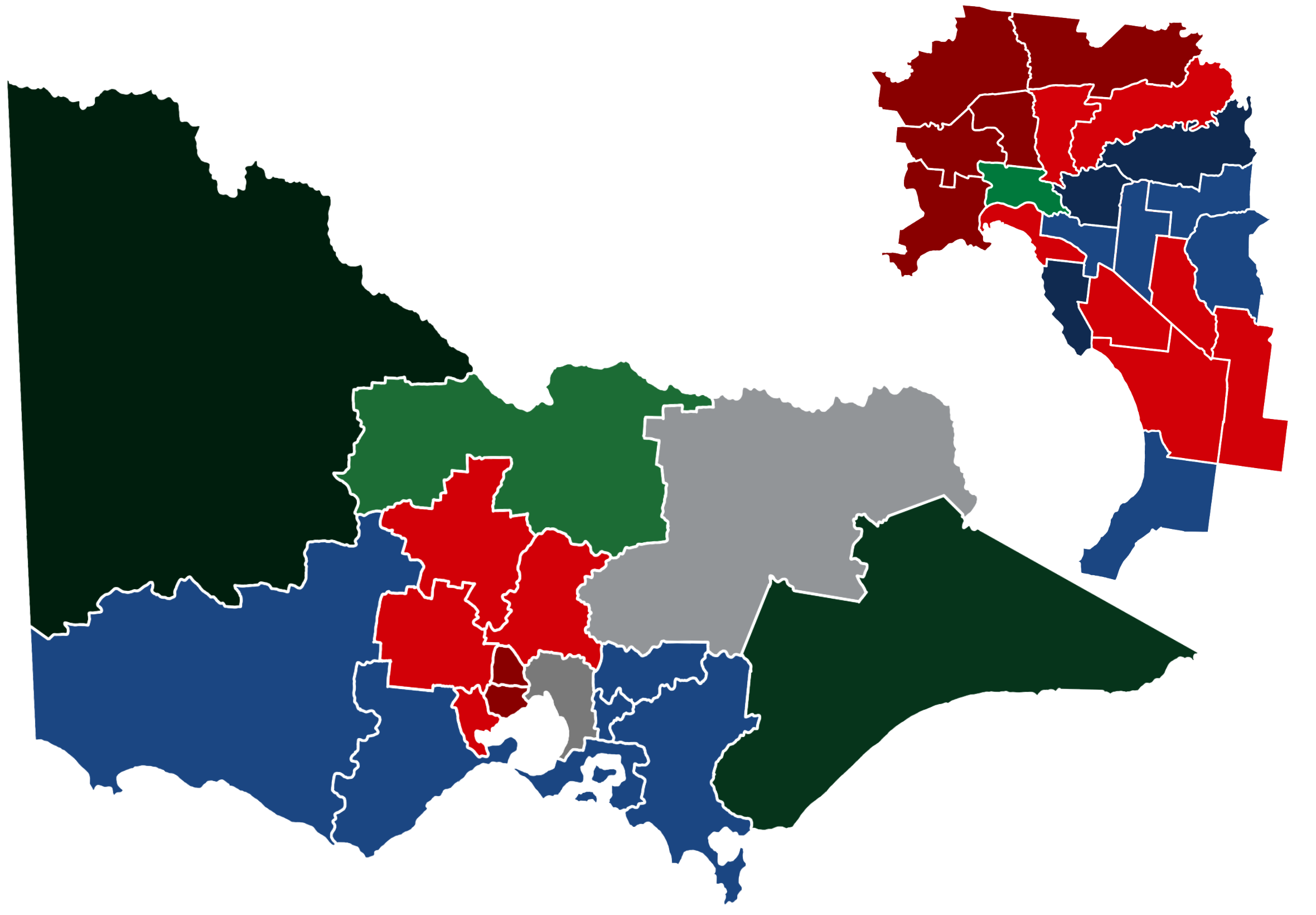

This is a list of electoral division results for the 2016 Australian federal election in the state of Victoria.

== Overall results ==
Party	Votes	%	Swing	Seats	Change
Liberal/National Coalition
Liberal Party of Australia	1,273,419	37.01	–3.07	14	Steady
National Party of Australia	163,514	4.75	+2.14	3	▲1
Coalition total	1,436,933	41.76	–0.93	17	▲1
Australian Labor Party	1,224,051	35.58	+0.77	18	▼1
Australian Greens	451,700	13.13	+2.33	1	Steady
Animal Justice Party	64,940	1.89	+1.83		
Family First Party	44,623	1.31	–0.50		
Rise Up Australia Party	39,579	1.15	+0.60		
Derryn Hinch's Justice Party	13,735	0.40	+0.40		
Liberal Democratic Party	13,006	0.38	+0.24		
Drug Law Reform Australia	11,464	0.33	+0.33		
Australian Sex Party	10,293	0.30	−1.75		
Australian Christians	8,953	0.26	−0.22		
Australian Country Party	7,033	0.20	+0.06		
Renewable Energy Party	3,571	0.10	+0.10		
Australian Equality Party (Marriage)	3,296	0.10	+0.10		
Australia First Party	3,232	0.09	−0.06		
Nick Xenophon Team	2,007	0.06	+0.06		
Citizens Electoral Council	1,942	0.06	+0.04		
Socialist Alliance	1,749	0.05	+0.00		
Shooters, Fishers and Farmers Party	1,321	0.04	+0.04		
Bullet Train for Australia	1,138	0.03	−0.02		
Voluntary Euthanasia Party	973	0.03	+0.03		
The Arts Party	542	0.02	+0.02		
Australian Cyclists Party	386	0.01	+0.01		
Socialist Equality Party	295	0.01	+0.01		
Australian Progressives	282	0.01	+0.01		
Independent	93,610	2.72	+1.08	1	Steady
Total	3,440,654			37	
Two-party-preferred vote
Australian Labor Party	1,783,375	51.83	+1.63	18	▼1
Liberal/National Coalition	1,657,279	48.17	−1.63	17	▲1
Source: AEC for both and

Labor to Liberal: Chisholm

Liberal to National: Murray

== Results by division ==
=== Aston ===
2016 Australian federal election: Aston
Party	Candidate	Votes	%	±%
Liberal	Alan Tudge	43,532	50.86	−0.73
Labor	Paul Klisaris	26,593	31.07	−1.56
Greens	Steve Raymond	7,186	8.40	+2.52
Family First	Daniel Martin	2,762	3.23	+0.46
Animal Justice	Rosemary Lavin	2,211	2.58	+2.58
Independent	Daniel Huppert	2,104	2.46	+2.46
Liberal Democrats	Joel Moore	1,198	1.40	+1.40
Total formal votes		85,586	96.04	+0.57
Informal votes		3,525	3.96	−0.57
Turnout		89,111	92.78	−1.95
Two-party-preferred result
Liberal	Alan Tudge	50,142	58.59	+0.39
Labor	Paul Klisaris	35,444	41.41	−0.39
Liberal hold		Swing	+0.39	

=== Ballarat ===
2016 Australian federal election: Ballarat
Party	Candidate	Votes	%	±%
Labor	Catherine King	42,275	43.27	+1.36
Liberal	Sarah Wade	33,931	34.73	−3.27
Greens	Alice Barnes	10,551	10.80	+1.29
National	Paul Tatchell	4,108	4.20	+4.20
Christians	Dianne Colbert	2,023	2.07	+0.85
Family First	Graham Howard	1,896	1.94	+0.72
Independent	Bren Eckel	1,802	1.84	+1.84
Rise Up Australia	Tran Tran	1,121	1.15	+0.91
Total formal votes		97,707	94.71	−0.63
Informal votes		5,461	5.29	+0.63
Turnout		103,168	93.15	−1.77
Two-party-preferred result
Labor	Catherine King	56,002	57.32	+2.43
Liberal	Sarah Wade	41,705	42.68	−2.43
Labor hold		Swing	+2.43	

=== Batman ===
2016 Australian federal election: Batman
Party	Candidate	Votes	%	±%
Greens	Alex Bhathal	32,645	36.23	+9.83
Labor	David Feeney	31,780	35.27	−6.02
Liberal	George Souris	17,924	19.89	−2.57
Sex Party	Joel Murray	2,317	2.57	−0.01
Independent	Philip Sutton	1,509	1.67	+0.86
Animal Justice	Caitlin Evans	1,503	1.67	+0.27
Marriage Equality	Elizabeth Syber	682	0.76	+0.76
Renewable Energy	Maurice Oldis	593	0.66	+0.66
Independent	Franco Guardiani	480	0.53	+0.53
Cyclists	Geoffrey Cicuto	386	0.43	+0.43
Progressives	Russell Hayward	282	0.31	+0.31
Total formal votes		90,101	92.22	−2.02
Informal votes		7,601	7.78	+2.02
Turnout		97,702	89.69	−1.91
Notional two-party-preferred count
Labor	David Feeney	64,645	71.75	+0.77
Liberal	George Souris	25,456	28.25	−0.77
Two-candidate-preferred result
Labor	David Feeney	45,977	51.03	−9.58
Greens	Alex Bhathal	44,124	48.97	+9.58
Labor hold		Swing	−9.58	

=== Bendigo ===
2016 Australian federal election: Bendigo
Party	Candidate	Votes	%	±%
Labor	Lisa Chesters	37,396	38.35	+1.79
Liberal	Megan Purcell	36,956	37.90	−1.77
Greens	Rosemary Glaisher	10,749	11.02	+1.72
National	Andy Maddison	3,544	3.63	−1.39
Family First	Alan Howard	2,732	2.80	+1.68
Animal Justice	Ruth Parramore	2,146	2.20	+2.20
Rise Up Australia	Sandy Caddy	2,058	2.11	+1.57
Independent	Anita Donlon	1,922	1.97	+1.97
Total formal votes		97,503	95.40	+1.11
Informal votes		4,705	4.60	−1.11
Turnout		102,208	93.25	−2.08
Two-party-preferred result
Labor	Lisa Chesters	52,398	53.74	+2.48
Liberal	Megan Purcell	45,105	46.26	−2.48
Labor hold		Swing	+2.48	

=== Bruce ===
2016 Australian federal election: Bruce
Party	Candidate	Votes	%	±%
Labor	Julian Hill	36,804	44.34	+2.44
Liberal	Helen Kroger	33,248	40.05	−2.91
Greens	Stefanie Bauer	5,890	7.10	+0.46
Family First	Nathan Foggie	2,870	3.46	+0.81
Animal Justice	Douglas Leith	1,944	2.34	+2.34
Drug Law Reform	Alan Roncan	1,440	1.73	+1.73
Renewable Energy	Jill Jarvis-Wills	816	0.98	+0.98
Total formal votes		83,012	95.33	+0.83
Informal votes		4,064	4.67	−0.83
Turnout		87,076	90.01	−2.27
Two-party-preferred result
Labor	Julian Hill	44,894	54.08	+2.28
Liberal	Helen Kroger	38,118	45.92	−2.28
Labor hold		Swing	+2.28	

=== Calwell ===
2016 Australian federal election: Calwell
Party	Candidate	Votes	%	±%
Labor	Maria Vamvakinou	51,040	56.81	+7.00
Liberal	John Hsu (disendorsed) (Note: The Liberal candidate John Hsu resigned from the party's ticket in June 2016. However, due to the AEC's nomination deadlines, Mr Hsu's name still appeared under the Liberal Party ticket on the ballot paper.)	24,855	27.66	−0.83
Greens	Natalie Abboud	7,609	8.47	+3.08
Animal Justice	Megan Searls	3,229	3.59	+3.59
Independent	Michael Lakkis	3,115	3.47	+3.47
Total formal votes		89,848	93.46	+1.38
Informal votes		6,286	6.54	−1.38
Turnout		96,134	87.87	−3.06
Two-party-preferred result
Labor	Maria Vamvakinou	60,978	67.87	+4.01
Liberal	John Hsu	28,870	32.13	−4.01
Labor hold		Swing	+4.01	

=== Casey ===
2016 Australian federal election: Casey
Party	Candidate	Votes	%	±%
Liberal	Tony Smith	45,680	49.53	+0.35
Labor	Hovig Melkonian	26,165	28.37	+0.52
Greens	Elissa Sutherland	10,781	11.69	+0.80
Animal Justice	Kristin Bacon	4,176	4.53	+4.53
Independent	Peter Charleton	2,878	3.12	+3.12
Rise Up Australia	Angela Dorian	2,551	2.77	+2.27
Total formal votes		92,231	96.22	+0.84
Informal votes		3,620	3.78	−0.84
Turnout		95,851	93.14	−1.81
Two-party-preferred result
Liberal	Tony Smith	51,703	56.06	−1.11
Labor	Hovig Melkonian	40,528	43.94	+1.11
Liberal hold		Swing	−1.11	

=== Chisholm ===
2016 Australian federal election: Chisholm
Party	Candidate	Votes	%	±%
Liberal	Julia Banks	39,265	45.28	+1.16
Labor	Stefanie Perri	31,160	35.93	−3.57
Greens	Josh Fergeus	10,647	12.28	+2.83
Family First	Craig McCracken	2,137	2.46	+1.36
Animal Justice	Nyree Walshe	1,799	2.07	+2.07
Rise Up Australia	Melanie Vassiliou	1,712	1.97	+1.22
Total formal votes		86,720	97.26	+1.49
Informal votes		2,439	2.74	−1.49
Turnout		89,159	91.52	−1.83
Two-party-preferred result
Liberal	Julia Banks	44,437	51.24	+2.84
Labor	Stefanie Perri	42,283	48.76	−2.84
Liberal gain from Labor		Swing	+2.84	

=== Corangamite ===
2016 Australian federal election: Corangamite
Party	Candidate	Votes	%	±%
Liberal	Sarah Henderson	45,687	46.42	−1.83
Labor	Libby Coker	30,267	30.75	−1.28
Greens	Patchouli Paterson	11,273	11.45	−0.41
Justice	Patrice Nelson	3,039	3.09	+3.09
Family First	Alan Barron	1,906	1.94	+0.96
Animal Justice	Andy Meddick	1,739	1.77	+1.77
Independent	Michael Lawrence	1,519	1.54	+1.54
Drug Law Reform	Courtney Dalton	1,269	1.29	+1.29
Liberal Democrats	Louis Rowe	871	0.89	+0.89
Rise Up Australia	Nick Steel	847	0.86	+0.57
Total formal votes		98,417	95.00	−0.57
Informal votes		5,181	5.00	+0.57
Turnout		103,598	93.94	−1.60
Two-party-preferred result
Liberal	Sarah Henderson	52,291	53.13	−0.81
Labor	Libby Coker	46,126	46.87	+0.81
Liberal hold		Swing	−0.81	

=== Corio ===
2016 Australian federal election: Corio
Party	Candidate	Votes	%	±%
Labor	Richard Marles	43,087	45.63	+2.12
Liberal	Richard Lange	33,180	35.14	−0.06
Greens	Sarah Mansfield	11,112	11.77	+4.46
Animal Justice	Jamie Overend	2,948	3.12	+3.12
Rise Up Australia	Ash Puvimanasinghe	1,869	1.98	+1.58
Bullet Train	Jeff Moran	1,138	1.21	+1.21
Socialist Alliance	Sue Bull	1,101	1.17	+0.42
Total formal votes		94,435	95.39	+0.69
Informal votes		4,561	4.61	−0.69
Turnout		98,996	91.83	−2.33
Two-party-preferred result
Labor	Richard Marles	56,656	59.99	+2.24
Liberal	Richard Lange	37,779	40.01	−2.24
Labor hold		Swing	+2.24	

=== Deakin ===
2016 Australian federal election: Deakin
Party	Candidate	Votes	%	±%
Liberal	Michael Sukkar	45,161	50.03	+4.15
Labor	Tony Clark	28,021	31.04	−1.69
Greens	Joshua Briers	10,587	11.73	+0.90
Animal Justice	Vanessa Browne	2,394	2.65	+2.65
Christians	Karen Dobby	2,096	2.32	+0.40
Family First	Gary Coombes	2,009	2.23	+0.87
Total formal votes		90,268	97.34	+1.67
Informal votes		2,471	2.66	−1.67
Turnout		92,739	93.02	−1.69
Two-party-preferred result
Liberal	Michael Sukkar	50,264	55.68	+2.50
Labor	Tony Clark	40,004	44.32	−2.50
Liberal hold		Swing	+2.50	

=== Dunkley ===
2016 Australian federal election: Dunkley
Party	Candidate	Votes	%	±%
Liberal	Chris Crewther	38,158	42.73	−6.02
Labor	Peta Murphy	29,620	33.17	+2.29
Greens	Jeanette Swain	8,616	9.65	+0.33
Justice	Ruth Stanfield	5,510	6.17	+6.17
Animal Justice	Tyson Jack	1,926	2.16	+2.16
Family First	Michael Rathbone	1,393	1.56	−0.35
Independent	Joseph Toscano	1,132	1.27	+1.27
Liberal Democrats	Tim Wilms	1,037	1.16	+1.16
Rise Up Australia	Lin Tregenza	682	0.76	+0.22
Christians	Jeff Reaney	677	0.76	+0.76
Arts	Sally Baillieu	542	0.61	+0.61
Total formal votes		89,293	93.56	−1.65
Informal votes		6,151	6.44	+1.65
Turnout		95,444	90.94	−2.35
Two-party-preferred result
Liberal	Chris Crewther	45,925	51.43	−4.14
Labor	Peta Murphy	43,368	48.57	+4.14
Liberal hold		Swing	−4.14	

=== Flinders ===
2016 Australian federal election: Flinders
Party	Candidate	Votes	%	±%
Liberal	Greg Hunt	52,412	51.60	−3.74
Labor	Carolyn Gleixner	27,459	27.03	+1.83
Greens	Willisa Hogarth	10,868	10.70	+0.96
Animal Justice	Ben Wild	4,347	4.28	+4.28
Rise Up Australia	Yvonne Gentle	3,381	3.33	+2.82
Independent	Shane Lewis	3,107	3.06	+3.06
Total formal votes		101,574	96.34	+1.31
Informal votes		3,863	3.66	−1.31
Turnout		105,437	91.40	−2.34
Two-party-preferred result
Liberal	Greg Hunt	58,683	57.77	−4.04
Labor	Carolyn Gleixner	42,891	42.23	+4.04
Liberal hold		Swing	−4.04	

=== Gellibrand ===
2016 Australian federal election: Gellibrand
Party	Candidate	Votes	%	±%
Labor	Tim Watts	43,340	46.90	+0.86
Liberal	Ben Willis	24,607	26.63	−0.08
Greens	Jonathon Marsden	19,855	21.48	+4.75
Independent	David Tran	4,615	4.99	+4.99
Total formal votes		92,417	95.98	+1.60
Informal votes		3,868	4.02	−1.60
Turnout		96,285	88.77	−1.84
Two-party-preferred result
Labor	Tim Watts	63,060	68.23	+1.70
Liberal	Ben Willis	29,357	31.77	−1.70
Labor hold		Swing	+1.70	

=== Gippsland ===
2016 Australian federal election: Gippsland
Party	Candidate	Votes	%	±%
National	Darren Chester	50,309	56.34	+2.58
Labor	Shashi Bhatti	17,870	20.01	−3.14
Greens	Ian Onley	7,002	7.84	+2.14
Liberal Democrats	Ben Buckley	4,444	4.98	−0.35
Family First	Brian Heath	3,068	3.44	+1.64
Independent	Cherie Smith	1,577	1.77	+1.77
Rise Up Australia	Peter Dorian	1,513	1.69	+1.27
Renewable Energy	Peter Gardner	1,384	1.55	+1.55
Independent	Christine Sindt	1,379	1.54	+1.54
Christians	Ashleigh Belsar	746	0.84	+0.84
Total formal votes		89,292	93.13	−0.88
Informal votes		6,588	6.87	+0.88
Turnout		95,880	92.11	−2.34
Two-party-preferred result
National	Darren Chester	61,106	68.43	+2.59
Labor	Shashi Bhatti	28,186	31.57	−2.59
National hold		Swing	+2.59	

=== Goldstein ===
2016 Australian federal election: Goldstein
Party	Candidate	Votes	%	±%
Liberal	Tim Wilson	52,694	56.33	−0.18
Labor	Matthew Coote	20,466	21.88	−1.95
Greens	Cheryl Hercus	14,871	15.90	0.00
Animal Justice	Naren Chellappah	2,222	2.38	+2.38
Drug Law Reform	Lee Kavanagh	1,738	1.86	+1.86
Family First	Trevor Bishop	1,549	1.66	+0.83
Total formal votes		93,540	97.54	+0.87
Informal votes		2,363	2.46	−0.87
Turnout		95,903	91.43	−1.74
Two-party-preferred result
Liberal	Tim Wilson	58,628	62.68	+1.65
Labor	Matthew Coote	34,912	37.32	−1.65
Liberal hold		Swing	+1.65	

=== Gorton ===
2016 Australian federal election: Gorton
Party	Candidate	Votes	%	±%
Labor	Brendan O'Connor	61,110	62.29	+11.56
Liberal	Daryl Lang	27,305	27.83	+2.35
Greens	Rod Swift	9,690	9.88	+3.49
Total formal votes		98,105	94.92	+2.03
Informal votes		5,253	5.08	−2.03
Turnout		103,358	89.12	−3.09
Two-party-preferred result
Labor	Brendan O'Connor	68,135	69.45	+3.33
Liberal	Daryl Lang	29,970	30.55	−3.33
Labor hold		Swing	+3.33	

=== Higgins ===
2016 Australian federal election: Higgins
Party	Candidate	Votes	%	±%
Liberal	Kelly O'Dwyer	46,953	52.00	−2.37
Greens	Jason Ball	22,870	25.33	+8.53
Labor	Carl Katter	13,495	14.95	−9.13
Xenophon	Nancy Bassett	2,007	2.22	+2.22
Animal Justice	Eleonora Gullone	1,344	1.49	+1.49
Marriage Equality	Rebecca O'Brien	1,265	1.40	+1.40
Justice	Jessica Tregear	1,264	1.40	+1.40
Liberal Democrats	Robert Kennedy	1,093	1.21	+1.21
Total formal votes		90,291	96.22	−0.20
Informal votes		3,550	3.78	+0.20
Turnout		93,841	89.65	−2.36
Notional two-party-preferred count
Liberal	Kelly O'Dwyer	54,798	60.69	+0.76
Labor	Carl Katter	35,493	39.31	–0.76
Two-candidate-preferred result
Liberal	Kelly O'Dwyer	52,359	57.99	–1.94
Greens	Jason Ball	37,932	42.01	+42.01
Liberal hold		Swing	N/A	

=== Holt ===
2016 Australian federal election: Holt
Party	Candidate	Votes	%	±%
Labor	Anthony Byrne	53,506	53.70	+5.51
Liberal	James Mathias	29,777	29.89	−2.74
Greens	Jake Tilton	6,317	6.34	+2.46
Family First	Neil Bull	5,614	5.63	+3.13
Rise Up Australia	Colin Robertson	4,416	4.43	+3.39
Total formal votes		99,630	95.00	+1.08
Informal votes		5,243	5.00	−1.08
Turnout		104,873	90.18	−2.63
Two-party-preferred result
Labor	Anthony Byrne	63,929	64.17	+5.08
Liberal	James Mathias	35,701	35.83	−5.08
Labor hold		Swing	+5.08	

=== Hotham ===
2016 Australian federal election: Hotham
Party	Candidate	Votes	%	±%
Labor	Clare O'Neil	39,881	45.75	−1.38
Liberal	George Hua	32,512	37.30	+0.16
Greens	James Bennett	8,042	9.23	+0.71
Animal Justice	Helen Jeges	2,593	2.97	+2.97
Family First	Tatiana Rathbone	2,106	2.42	+0.31
Rise Up Australia	Peter Vassiliou	2,030	2.33	+0.71
Total formal votes		87,164	96.13	+0.96
Informal votes		3,511	3.87	−0.96
Turnout		90,675	90.68	−1.85
Two-party-preferred result
Labor	Clare O'Neil	50,104	57.48	+0.21
Liberal	George Hua	37,060	42.52	−0.21
Labor hold		Swing	+0.21	

=== Indi ===
2016 Australian federal election: Indi
Party	Candidate	Votes	%	±%
Independent	Cathy McGowan	31,336	34.76	+3.58
Liberal	Sophie Mirabella	24,887	27.61	−17.07
National	Marty Corboy	15,525	17.22	+17.22
Labor	Eric Kerr	8,826	9.79	−1.86
Greens	Jenny O'Connor	3,445	3.82	+0.40
Country	Julian Fidge	1,863	2.07	+2.07
Independent	Alan Lappin	1,757	1.95	+1.95
Rise Up Australia	Vincent Ferrando	1,150	1.28	+0.17
Liberal Democrats	Tim Quilty	886	0.98	+0.98
Independent	Ray Dyer	462	0.51	+0.51
Total formal votes		90,137	93.47	−1.44
Informal votes		6,299	6.53	+1.44
Turnout		96,436	92.96	−2.15
Notional two-party-preferred count
Liberal	Sophie Mirabella	49,038	54.40	−4.70
Labor	Eric Kerr	41,099	45.60	+4.70
Two-candidate-preferred result
Independent	Cathy McGowan	49,421	54.83	+4.58
Liberal	Sophie Mirabella	40,716	45.17	−4.58
Independent hold		Swing	+4.58	

=== Isaacs ===
2016 Australian federal election: Isaacs
Party	Candidate	Votes	%	±%
Labor	Mark Dreyfus	41,144	44.49	+3.16
Liberal	Garry Spencer	37,312	40.35	+0.14
Greens	Alex Breskin	9,429	10.20	+3.14
Animal Justice	Elizabeth Johnston	4,585	4.96	+4.96
Total formal votes		92,470	96.31	+1.11
Informal votes		3,539	3.69	−1.11
Turnout		96,009	90.78	−2.26
Two-party-preferred result
Labor	Mark Dreyfus	51,538	55.73	+1.87
Liberal	Garry Spencer	40,932	44.27	−1.87
Labor hold		Swing	+1.87	

=== Jagajaga ===
2016 Australian federal election: Jagajaga
Party	Candidate	Votes	%	±%
Liberal	David Mulholland	37,920	41.03	−0.91
Labor	Jenny Macklin	36,238	39.21	+1.21
Greens	Hugh McKinnon	13,696	14.82	+1.87
Family First	Jessica Ward	2,341	2.53	+0.90
Animal Justice	Nathan Schram	2,235	2.42	+2.42
Total formal votes		92,430	97.29	+1.02
Informal votes		2,572	2.71	−1.02
Turnout		95,002	92.12	−1.90
Two-party-preferred result
Labor	Jenny Macklin	50,536	54.67	+1.54
Liberal	David Mulholland	41,894	45.33	−1.54
Labor hold		Swing	+1.54	

=== Kooyong ===
2016 Australian federal election: Kooyong
Party	Candidate	Votes	%	±%
Liberal	Josh Frydenberg	52,401	58.22	+2.53
Labor	Marg D'Arcy	17,825	19.80	−2.63
Greens	Helen McLeod	17,027	18.92	+2.34
Independent	Angelina Zubac	2,750	3.06	+2.35
Total formal votes		90,003	98.01	+1.40
Informal votes		1,823	1.99	−1.40
Turnout		91,826	91.70	−1.76
Two-party-preferred result
Liberal	Josh Frydenberg	57,007	63.34	+2.28
Labor	Marg D'Arcy	32,996	36.66	−2.28
Liberal hold		Swing	+2.28	

=== La Trobe ===
2016 Australian federal election: La Trobe
Party	Candidate	Votes	%	±%
Liberal	Jason Wood	39,108	42.23	−3.82
Labor	Simon Curtis	29,052	31.37	−0.69
Greens	Tom Cummings	9,773	10.55	+0.53
Justice	Julieanne Doidge	3,922	4.24	+4.24
Animal Justice	Leah Folloni	2,677	2.89	+2.89
Family First	Jeffrey Bartram	2,273	2.45	+0.56
Sex Party	Martin Leahy	2,103	2.27	−0.52
Shooters, Fishers, Farmers	David Fent	1,321	1.43	+1.43
Liberal Democrats	Leslie Hughes	1,188	1.28	+1.28
Rise Up Australia	Margaret Quinn	1,180	1.27	+0.47
Total formal votes		92,597	94.44	−1.17
Informal votes		5,454	5.56	+1.17
Turnout		98,051	92.74	−2.10
Two-party-preferred result
Liberal	Jason Wood	47,649	51.46	−2.55
Labor	Simon Curtis	44,948	48.54	+2.55
Liberal hold		Swing	−2.55	

=== Lalor ===
2016 Australian federal election: Lalor
Party	Candidate	Votes	%	±%
Labor	Joanne Ryan	55,302	51.80	+6.63
Liberal	Gayle Murphy	33,070	30.98	+1.72
Greens	Daniel Sova	10,471	9.81	+3.80
Rise Up Australia	Marion Vale	4,685	4.39	+2.59
Australia First	Susan Jakobi	3,232	3.03	+3.03
Total formal votes		106,760	95.46	+2.09
Informal votes		5,080	4.54	−2.09
Turnout		111,840	90.48	−2.65
Two-party-preferred result
Labor	Joanne Ryan	67,731	63.44	+1.28
Liberal	Gayle Murphy	39,029	36.56	−1.28
Labor hold		Swing	+1.28	

=== Mallee ===
2016 Australian federal election: Mallee
Party	Candidate	Votes	%	±%
National	Andrew Broad	56,251	64.31	+25.55
Labor	Lydia Senior	18,742	21.43	+3.93
Greens	Helen Healy	6,222	7.11	+4.04
Rise Up Australia	Tim Middleton	4,536	5.19	+4.29
Citizens Electoral Council	Chris Lahy	1,715	1.96	+1.68
Total formal votes		87,466	95.35	+2.26
Informal votes		4,269	4.65	−2.26
Turnout		91,735	92.36	−2.31
Two-party-preferred result
National	Andrew Broad	62,383	71.32	−2.34
Labor	Lydia Senior	25,083	28.68	+2.34
National hold		Swing	−2.34	

=== Maribyrnong ===
2016 Australian federal election: Maribyrnong
Party	Candidate	Votes	%	±%
Labor	Bill Shorten	47,402	50.52	+2.62
Liberal	Ted Hatzakortzian	30,283	32.27	−0.76
Greens	Olivia Ball	9,151	9.75	−0.15
Independent	Catherine Cumming	3,172	3.38	+3.38
Animal Justice	Fiona McRostie	2,176	2.32	+2.32
Christians	Anthony O'Neill	1,650	1.76	+0.77
Total formal votes		93,834	95.36	+1.54
Informal votes		4,568	4.64	−1.54
Turnout		98,402	89.22	−2.32
Two-party-preferred result
Labor	Bill Shorten	58,465	62.31	+0.92
Liberal	Ted Hatzakortzian	35,369	37.69	−0.92
Labor hold		Swing	+0.92	

=== McEwen ===
2016 Australian federal election: McEwen
Party	Candidate	Votes	%	±%
Labor	Rob Mitchell	50,588	44.69	+7.07
Liberal	Chris Jermyn	38,151	33.70	−6.64
Greens	Neil Barker	8,583	7.58	+0.48
Family First	Dorothy Long	3,707	3.27	+0.40
Independent	Ross Lee	3,013	2.66	+2.66
Animal Justice	Cathy Vaina	3,005	2.65	+2.65
National	James Anderson	2,672	2.36	+2.36
Rise Up Australia	Jeff Truscott	1,867	1.65	+1.19
Country	Tracey Andrew	1,614	1.43	+0.75
Total formal votes		113,200	94.03	−1.35
Informal votes		7,189	5.97	+1.35
Turnout		120,389	92.17	−2.62
Two-party-preferred result
Labor	Rob Mitchell	65,482	57.85	+7.70
Liberal	Chris Jermyn	47,718	42.15	−7.70
Labor hold		Swing	+7.70	

=== McMillan ===
2016 Australian federal election: McMillan
Party	Candidate	Votes	%	±%
Liberal	Russell Broadbent	48,304	47.86	−2.50
Labor	Chris Buckingham	29,531	29.26	+4.21
Greens	Donna Lancaster	9,810	9.72	+2.10
Family First	Nathan Harding	3,418	3.39	+1.38
Animal Justice	Jennifer McAdam	3,022	2.99	+2.99
Rise Up Australia	Norman Baker	2,786	2.76	+2.09
Liberal Democrats	Jim McDonald	2,289	2.27	+2.27
Christians	Kathleen Ipsen	1,761	1.74	+1.74
Total formal votes		100,921	94.29	+0.40
Informal votes		6,115	5.71	−0.40
Turnout		107,036	92.11	−2.53
Two-party-preferred result
Liberal	Russell Broadbent	56,543	56.03	−5.80
Labor	Chris Buckingham	44,378	43.97	+5.80
Liberal hold		Swing	−5.80	

=== Melbourne ===
2016 Australian federal election: Melbourne
Party	Candidate	Votes	%	±%
Greens	Adam Bandt	41,377	43.75	+1.13
Liberal	Le Liu	23,878	25.25	+2.42
Labor	Sophie Ismail	23,130	24.46	−2.14
Sex Party	Lewis Freeman-Harrison	3,265	3.45	+1.53
Animal Justice	Miranda Smith	1,742	1.84	+1.10
Drug Law Reform	Matt Riley	1,187	1.26	+1.26
Total formal votes		94,579	97.52	+3.47
Informal votes		2,404	2.48	−3.47
Turnout		96,983	86.79	−3.90
Notional two-party-preferred count
Labor	Sophie Ismail	62,963	66.57	−2.68
Liberal	Le Liu	31,616	33.43	+2.68
Two-candidate-preferred result
Greens	Adam Bandt	64,771	68.48	+13.21
Liberal	Le Liu	29,808	31.52	+31.52
Greens hold				

=== Melbourne Ports ===
2016 Australian federal election: Melbourne Ports
Party	Candidate	Votes	%	±%
Liberal	Owen Guest	35,533	41.90	+0.85
Labor	Michael Danby	22,897	27.00	−4.67
Greens	Steph Hodgins-May	20,179	23.79	+3.62
Animal Justice	Robert Smyth	1,685	1.99	+1.99
Independent	Peter Holland	1,393	1.64	+1.64
Marriage Equality	Henry von Doussa	1,349	1.59	+1.59
Drug Law Reform	Levi McKenzie-Kirkbright	1,348	1.59	+1.59
Independent	John Myers	425	0.50	+0.50
Total formal votes		84,809	95.76	−0.42
Informal votes		3,756	4.24	+0.42
Turnout		88,565	86.59	−3.45
Two-party-preferred result
Labor	Michael Danby	43,573	51.38	−2.18
Liberal	Owen Guest	41,236	48.62	+2.18
Labor hold		Swing	−2.18	

=== Menzies ===
2016 Australian federal election: Menzies
Party	Candidate	Votes	%	±%
Liberal	Kevin Andrews	45,133	51.72	−7.16
Labor	Adam Rundell	21,468	24.60	−1.06
Greens	Richard Cranston	7,921	9.08	+0.45
Independent	Stephen Mayne	5,863	6.72	+6.72
Family First	David Clark	2,842	3.26	+1.10
Animal Justice	Antony Hulbert	2,327	2.67	+2.67
Voluntary Euthanasia	Jay Franklin	973	1.12	+1.12
Independent	Ramon Robinson	730	0.84	−0.61
Total formal votes		87,257	94.98	−0.72
Informal votes		4,615	5.02	+0.72
Turnout		91,872	92.61	−1.46
Two-party-preferred result
Liberal	Kevin Andrews	52,842	60.56	−3.89
Labor	Adam Rundell	34,415	39.44	+3.89
Liberal hold		Swing	−3.89	

=== Murray ===
2016 Australian federal election: Murray
Party	Candidate	Votes	%	±%
National	Damian Drum	31,105	35.34	+35.34
Liberal	Duncan McGauchie	28,194	32.03	−29.38
Labor	Alan Williams	13,188	14.98	−5.76
Greens	Ian Christoe	3,880	4.41	+0.48
Country	Robert Danieli	3,556	4.04	+4.04
Independent	Fern Summer	3,323	3.78	+3.78
Independent	Andrew Bock	1,467	1.67	+1.67
Rise Up Australia	Yasmin Gunasekera	1,195	1.36	+0.73
Independent	Diane Teasdale	1,037	1.18	+1.18
Independent	Nigel Hicks	844	0.96	+0.96
Citizens Electoral Council	Jeff Davy	227	0.26	−0.10
Total formal votes		88,016	91.16	−2.51
Informal votes		8,530	8.84	+2.51
Turnout		96,546	92.51	−2.04
Notional two-party-preferred count
Liberal	Duncan McGauchie	65,920	74.90	+4.03
Labor	Alan Williams	22,096	25.10	−4.03
Two-candidate-preferred result
National	Damian Drum	48,527	55.13	+55.13
Liberal	Duncan McGauchie	39,489	44.87	−26.00
National gain from Liberal		Swing	N/A	

=== Scullin ===
2016 Australian federal election: Scullin
Party	Candidate	Votes	%	±%
Labor	Andrew Giles	54,541	57.00	+6.74
Liberal	Melanie Stockman	27,261	28.49	−0.65
Greens	Rose Ljubicic	7,294	7.62	+0.13
Animal Justice	John Matlen	3,387	3.54	+3.54
Drug Law Reform	Adriana Buccianti	3,195	3.34	+3.34
Total formal votes		95,678	94.88	+1.31
Informal votes		5,164	5.12	−1.31
Turnout		100,842	91.20	−2.07
Two-party-preferred result
Labor	Andrew Giles	64,369	67.28	+2.93
Liberal	Melanie Stockman	31,309	32.72	−2.93
Labor hold		Swing	+2.93	

=== Wannon ===
2016 Australian federal election: Wannon
Party	Candidate	Votes	%	±%
Liberal	Dan Tehan	47,513	53.23	−0.50
Labor	Michael Barling	27,411	30.71	+1.18
Greens	Thomas Campbell	7,264	8.14	+1.71
Independent	Michael McCluskey	4,048	4.54	+4.54
Independent	Bernardine Atkinson	3,019	3.38	+3.38
Total formal votes		89,255	96.04	+0.03
Informal votes		3,681	3.96	−0.03
Turnout		92,936	93.73	−1.88
Two-party-preferred result
Liberal	Dan Tehan	52,625	58.96	−1.11
Labor	Michael Barling	36,630	41.04	+1.11
Liberal hold		Swing	−1.11	

=== Wills ===
2016 Australian federal election: Wills
Party	Candidate	Votes	%	±%
Labor	Peter Khalil	35,431	37.65	−7.49
Greens	Samantha Ratnam	29,017	30.83	+8.60
Liberal	Kevin Hong	20,634	21.93	−0.91
Sex Party	Tristram Chellew	2,608	2.77	+0.16
Independent	Francesco Timpano	1,832	1.95	+1.95
Animal Justice	Camille Sydow	1,578	1.68	+1.68
Drug Law Reform	Ash Blackwell	1,287	1.37	+1.37
Renewable Energy	Dougal Gillman	778	0.83	+0.83
Socialist Alliance	Zane Alcorn	648	0.69	−0.44
Socialist Equality	Will Fulgenzi	295	0.31	+0.31
Total formal votes		94,108	93.25	−1.22
Informal votes		6,807	6.75	+1.22
Turnout		100,915	88.64	−2.29
Notional two-party-preferred count
Labor	Peter Khalil	67,037	71.23	+0.47
Liberal	Kevin Hong	27,071	28.77	−0.47
Two-candidate-preferred result
Labor	Peter Khalil	51,646	54.88	−10.32
Greens	Samantha Ratnam	42,462	45.12	+10.32
Labor hold		Swing	−10.32	
