= Pride Round =

Pride Round is a sporting event that celebrates gender diversity and promotes inclusivity for LGBT+ players.

Pride Round may refer to:

- Pride Round (AFLW), a round played by the AFL Women's League (Australian rules football)
- Pride Round (AIHL), a round in the Australian Ice Hockey League, hosted by the Melbourne Mustangs since 2017
  - 2017 AIHL season inaugural Pride Round
- Pride Round (A-League Men), a round played by Australian top division men's soccer league
- Pride Round (A-League Women), a round played by Australian top division men's soccer league
- Pride Round (NRL), a single round played by the National Rugby League in Australia in 2022, discontinued

== See also ==
- Pride Cup, an organisation dedicated to advocating for the LGBTQIA+ community in Australian sport
- Pride Games (Sydney Swans), an annual game played by the Sydney Swans in the Australian Football League (men's Australian rules football)
