= Sophie Mirabella =

Australian lawyer and former politician

Commissioner Sophie Mirabella
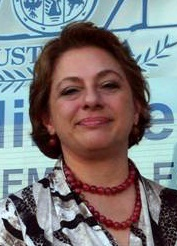

Commissioner of the Fair Work Commission
- Incumbent
- Assumed office 24 May 2021
- Nominated by: Michaelia Cash

Member of the Australian Parliament for Indi
- In office 10 November 2001 – 7 September 2013
- Preceded by: Lou Lieberman
- Succeeded by: Cathy McGowan

Personal details
- Born: Sophie Panopoulos; 27 October 1968 (age 58) Melbourne, Victoria, Australia
- Party: Liberal
- Spouse: Greg Mirabella (m. 2006)
- Education: University of Melbourne
- Profession: Barrister
- Website: sophiemirabella.com.au (archived)

Sophie Mirabella (née Panopoulos; born 27 October 1968) is an Australian lawyer and former politician who currently serves as a Commissioner on the Fair Work Commission since 24 May 2021. She was previously a Liberal Party member of the Australian House of Representatives from 2001 to 2013, representing the Division of Indi, Victoria.

After spending a number of years on the backbench, Mirabella moved to the position of Shadow Parliamentary Secretary for Local Government after the Coalition lost government in 2007 and to the role of Spokeswoman on Early Childhood Education, Childcare, Women and Youth in 2008. In 2009, she was appointed as the Shadow Minister for Innovation, Industry, Science and Research.

Mirabella narrowly lost her seat of Indi at the 2013 federal election to independent candidate Cathy McGowan. She also resigned from the Coalition frontbench shortly prior to conceding defeat. She subsequently attempted to regain the seat, standing again for the Liberal Party at the 2016 election, but was defeated by McGowan again on an increased margin.

== Early life and education ==
Mirabella was born Sophie Panopoulos in Melbourne, Victoria, her parents having arrived in Australia from Greece in 1956. She was educated at St Catherine's School, Toorak, while working part-time at her father's milk bar in South Melbourne. Upon finishing secondary school, she attended the University of Melbourne where she studied law and became involved in student activism through the Melbourne University Liberal Club, of which she was president, and as vice-president of the Australian Liberal Students' Federation. After graduating from Melbourne University with degrees in law and commerce, Mirabella worked as a solicitor and articled clerk from 1995 to 1997. From 1998 until her election to Parliament she worked as a barrister.

== Political career ==
Mirabella has been a member of the Liberal Party since 1987. She became well known during the constitutional monarchy/republican debate in Australia, acting as a prominent advocate for retaining the constitutional monarchy, and was an elected member of the 1998 Constitutional Convention. The referendum that followed saw all states and a majority of Australians support the retention of the constitutional monarchy over the republican model that was offered. In 2001 Mirabella won preselection as the Liberal candidate to succeed Lou Lieberman as the Member for Indi, standing against Sussan Ley, which she won in the 2001 federal election with a vote of 61.15% on a two-party preferred basis. Mirabella received a well above-average 5.6% swing to her in the 2004 federal election, giving her 66.3% of the two-party preferred vote and making Indi a safe Liberal seat.

Within the federal government, Mirabella sat in the backbench until 2007. During this time, in 2005, she attracted public attention as a key member of an informal "ginger group" of Liberal backbenchers. She chaired this group with Victorian Senator Mitch Fifield. The group argued for "tax reform" (in essence, tax cuts paid for by reductions in government spending), sparking public debate on the topic. Although Fifield stepped away from the group after budget cuts in 2005, Mirabella continued for a time as the group's chair. While on the backbench, Mirabella took a strong stance on the prominent issue of asylum seekers, criticising a group of four fellow Liberal backbenchers, including Petro Georgiou and Judi Moylan, for opposing government policy on mandatory detention. In August 2005, she called for Muslim women to be required to remove their head dress when posing for photo identification. Mirabella was an advocate of voluntary student unionism (VSU) and strongly supported the legislation proposed by Brendan Nelson.

=== In opposition ===
In 2007 the Coalition lost the federal election and entered opposition. After the election, Mirabella was promoted to the role of Shadow Parliamentary Secretary for Local Government under the leadership of Brendan Nelson. While serving in that role, she attracted controversy in January 2008 when she launched an attack on former Liberal Party Prime Minister Malcolm Fraser, after a speech he gave at Melbourne University on "the Bush Administration (reversing) 60 years of progress in establishing a law-based international system", claiming errors and "either intellectual sloppiness or deliberate dishonesty", and that he tacitly supported Islamic fundamentalism, should have no influence on foreign policy, and that his stance on the war on terror has left him open to caricature as a "frothing-at-the-mouth leftie". She was also one of five Liberal MPs not present in February 2008, when a motion was passed unanimously apologising to the stolen generations of indigenous children between Federation and the 1970s. She explained her decision by asserting that there had never been a formal policy in Victoria of removing children from their families and that there is no evidence for any "truly stolen" children, despite the fact that the first laws passed giving authorities the right to take children from their parents were passed and used in Victoria.

Mirabella was one of those who pledged their support to Malcolm Turnbull when he challenged Brendan Nelson for leadership of the Liberal Party in September 2008. She was promoted as part of the subsequent reshuffle, becoming the opposition spokeswoman on early childhood education, childcare, women and youth. Her move to the Shadow Cabinet came in 2009 after Tony Abbott defeated Turnbull in a leadership spill. She was promoted to the role of spokeswoman for innovation, industry, science and research. Mirabella had joined Abbott in resigning from the frontbench over Turnbull's climate change policy, and her move to the Shadow Cabinet was seen as part of the rise of the social-conservative right within the party.

After the 2010 election, she held her seat with a margin of 9.9% two party preferred against Labor.

=== Parliamentary style ===
According to Fenella Souter in the Sydney Morning Herald, Mirabella is known for her "caustic, confrontational manner". Her behaviour led her to be ejected from parliament at least twice. In 2007, David Hawker expelled her for shouting at him after being warned twice to resume her seat. She defied parliamentary orders under Standing Order No. 94A and thus was removed from the House of Representatives for misconduct. In 2011, Peter Slipper expelled Mirabella from parliament for 24 hours on the eve of the vote on the carbon tax, when she "refused to accept a ruling barring her from tabling an anti-carbon tax petition".

On a number of occasions her comments both inside and outside parliament attracted controversy. In 2008, Mirabella stated in parliament to Prime Minister Julia Gillard, who has no children, "You won't need his (ex-PM Kevin Rudd's) taxpayer-funded nanny, will you?" Mirabella again created controversy on 2 March 2011, when she compared Gillard to Muammar Gaddafi, claiming both were delusional. Abbott refused to condemn Mirabella, instead terming the comparison "colourful" and not language he would use. In 2012, she denounced fellow Liberal NSW Senator Bill Heffernan by telling him to "Oh, why don't you go and pop your Alzheimer's pills". This was in response to Heffernan branding a fellow Liberal senator a "fuckwit".

Mirabella was a frequent panellist on the ABC TV talkback show Q&A. On one show in 2012 a fellow panellist (GetUp! director and unsuccessful Greens Senate candidate Simon Sheikh) had a seizure live on air, with his head falling forward on the desk. Mirabella was criticised on Twitter for not physically responding to his situation. A spokesperson for Mirabella said she was unaware it was a medical emergency. Of the panelists, only Greg Combet physically responded to the situation. Sheikh made a full recovery off camera.

Prior to the 2013 federal election, retiring independent MP Tony Windsor nominated Mirabella for "the nasty prize" when asked who was the person he would miss least in politics on the ABC Insiders program. "She is the nastiest – I reckon if you put it to a vote to all politicians, she'd come up No.1".

=== 2013 federal election defeat ===
Mirabella was defeated in Indi by independent candidate Cathy McGowan at the 2013 federal election. She was the only sitting Coalition member to lose her seat.

On 11 September 2013, 1003 votes were discovered to have been misreported in a transcription error three days earlier. These were for McGowan, and strengthened her slight lead in the count. On 12 September, Mirabella issued a statement that, as the result in Indi would not be known for "many days", and her "future in the Parliament is not assured", she had requested Prime Minister-elect Abbott not consider her for a frontbench position in the new government. Abbott was quoted in reply: "I pay tribute to Sophie Mirabella and thank her for her magnanimity in ensuring the continuing vote count in Indi does not hinder formation of the new ministry."

On 18 September 2013, Mirabella conceded defeat, the same day Abbott and his government were sworn in. The final result in Indi saw Mirabella's Liberal two-candidate preferred vote at 49.8% (−10.2), with the primary vote at 44.7% (−7.2) and the two-party preferred vote at 59.1% (+0.1).

On 17 December 2013 Mirabella was named as an appointee to the board of ASC Pty Ltd – formerly known as the Australian Submarine Corporation. Mirabella's past shadow cabinet roles were considered relevant to the appointment. A statement read "Combined with her legal background and her extensive experience working with the manufacturing industry, Mrs Mirabella will make a valuable contribution to the board". The appointment was greeted with cynicism by one journalist, describing the appointment as "jobs for the girls".

=== 2016 federal election defeat ===
In May 2015, Mirabella stated Liberal minister Scott Morrison would be the "next conservative prime minister of Australia", and announced she would be contesting preselection for her former seat. In June, Mirabella secured endorsement as the Liberal candidate for the seat of Indi at the 2016 federal election.

During the lead up to the official election campaign it was reported that Mirabella "very publicly pushed Ms McGowan out of the way to obstruct" a photo being taken of her opponent, Cathy McGowan, with a Liberal MP, Ken Wyatt. Mirabella went on Twitter to "emphatically reject reports I pushed Cathy McGowan"; the editor of the Benalla Ensign stated that she confirmed the incident with four sources and defended the reporting on the basis of "public interest". Mirabella denied the allegations and is reported as examining legal remedies. She stated that it was "extremely disappointing that the journalist at no time sought to contact me or check the facts or seek a right of reply." She also said "I am currently investigating my legal remedies and those available through the Australian Press Council" and "The article represents a new low and a sad return to nasty tactics from my opponents." It was reported that a witness denied that any physical altercation took place.

On 21 April 2016, Mirabella alleged that during her failed election bid in 2013, A$10 million of public funding for Wangaratta Hospital was promised by the then opposition leader, Tony Abbott. She also alleged that, due to her eventual election loss to independent candidate Cathy McGowan, this funding was scrapped by the newly elected coalition government. Mirabella claimed that her own party was the source of a series of damaging leaks to undermine her.

Mirabella's bid to reclaim the seat of Indi was ultimately unsuccessful, with Independent Cathy McGowan claiming victory in the race, with a near 4.5% swing against Mirabella after preferences. Mirabella's first preference vote suffered a drop in excess of 17%, largely due to the Nationals Party fielding a candidate in Indi.

McGowan retained Indi against Mirabella at the 2016 election with an increased 54.8% (+4.6) two-candidate-preferred vote. The Liberal two-party-preferred vote was reduced to 54.4% (–4.7) against Labor's 45.6% (+4.7), a marginal two-party result not seen since the 1929 election.

== Post-politics ==
In August 2016, Mirabella became the general manager of government and media relations for Gina Rinehart's company Hancock Prospecting. In 2021, Mirabella was appointed a Commissioner to the Fair Work Commission. She commenced in that role on 24 May 2021.

== Personal life ==
In 1995, Mirabella began a live-in relationship with Colin Howard, then dean of law at Melbourne University, who was forty years her senior. The relationship ended in 2001, although they remained close until his death in 2011. Mirabella held power of attorney over Howard's affairs from early 2007, and he was diagnosed with Alzheimer's in the following year. Pursuant to his 1997 will, Mirabella was executor and sole beneficiary of his estate following his death in 2011. Howard's adult children threatened "a bitter legal dispute" over the will, but there was no legal challenge mounted to either its veracity or validity.

In June 2006, she married Greg Mirabella, a farmer and former Australian Army Reserve officer working in the defence industry, and later a senator for Victoria. The couple have two daughters.

Parliament of Australia
Preceded by Lou Lieberman	Member for Indi; 2001–2013	Succeeded by Cathy McGowan
