= Cathy McGowan (politician) =

Australian politician

Cathy McGowan AO
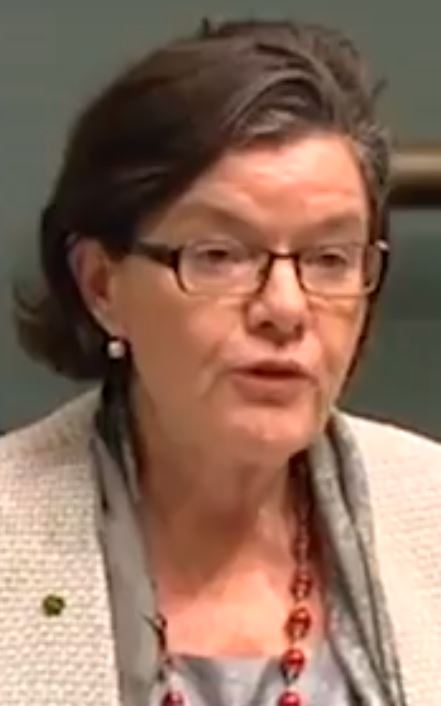
- McGowan speaking in parliament in 2018

Member of the Australian Parliament for Indi
- In office 7 September 2013 – 11 April 2019
- Preceded by: Sophie Mirabella
- Succeeded by: Helen Haines

Personal details
- Born: Catherine McGowan; 29 November 1953 (age 72) Albury, New South Wales, Australia
- Party: Independent
- Domestic partner: David Wolfenden
- Education: University of Western Sydney
- Occupation: Politician
- Profession: Agricultural consultant, farmer, educator
- Website: cathymcgowan.com.au

Catherine McGowan AO (born 29 November 1953) is an Australian farmer, agricultural consultant and former politician who served as the Independent Member for the Federal Seat of Indi from 2013 to 2019. Before her career in politics she worked as an educator, and rural advocate.

Upon her election in 2013, McGowan became the first non-coalition member elected to the seat since 1929, and defeated a 12-year incumbent, Sophie Mirabella, in an upset. The result in Indi, and McGowan's performance as MP, has been partly cited as a catalyst for the emergence of the Voices Movement, in Australian politics. McGowan was re-elected in 2016, by a larger margin before standing down at the 2019 Federal Election.

== Personal life ==
The fourth of thirteen children, McGowan was born in Albury before being brought up on a 100-acre property in the Indigo Valley. Her father Paul McGowan OAM (1924 - 2012) was an agricultural scientist and grassroots member of the Liberal Party.

She purchased a sheep farm in the Indigo Valley in the late 1970s with financial support from her family as banks routinely discriminated against single women for agricultural loans.

== Education and Career ==
McGowan completed a Bachelor of Arts Degree in History and Economics at Monash University, later gaining a diploma of Education from the University of Melbourne in 1976 and a master's degree in applied science in Agricultural and Rural Development from the University of Western Sydney in 1993.

McGowan briefly worked as a teacher before joining the office of Liberal MP and her predecessor for Indi, Ewan Cameron in 1980 as a staffer. After 1983 she began working as a consultant in rural, community and agricultural affairs. She also lectured at the University of Western Sydney from 1992 to 2003.

After attaining her Masters, McGowan was the inaugural secretary of Australian Women in Agriculture, and became president of the organisation in 1998. She also served as a regional Councillor for the Victorian Farmers Federation.

McGowan was a recipient of the Centenary Medal in 2001, and in 2004, she was made an Officer of the Order of Australia "for service to the community through raising awareness of and stimulating debate about issues affecting women in regional, rural and remote areas."

== Politics ==
=== Campaigns ===
==== 2013 ====
McGowan ran as an independent for the Division of Indi at the 2013 Australian federal election, against the Liberal incumbent Sophie Mirabella. The seat had long been believed to be a conservative stronghold; it had been held by a conservative party for all but nine years since Federation, and without interruption since 1931.

McGowan was put forward by Voices for Indi, a grassroots organization of local residents who felt Mirabella had taken them for granted. They ultimately decided to draft an independent challenger to run against Mirabella. However, several prominent locals balked, fearing Mirabella would retaliate against them if she won another term. McGowan finally accepted.

After eleven days of counting, on 18 September, Mirabella conceded defeat and McGowan claimed victory, winning the seat with a final margin of 431 votes, a two-candidate preferred vote of 50.25 percent. Mirabella was the only Liberal incumbent to lose her seat at the 2013 election that saw a decisive Coalition win. The ABC's Barrie Cassidy described McGowan's candidacy as "a warning to the occupants of safe seats everywhere on both sides of politics."

It was claimed in October 2014 that 20 McGowan supporters who formerly lived in Indi changed their electoral roll details back to Indi. The Commonwealth Department of Public Prosecutions pursued charges against two young voters. Their defence lawyers successfully argued the charges were "scurrilous" and that they had followed the Australian Electoral Commission's published advice in enrolling at their home address; on 5 April 2016 a Melbourne Magistrate dismissed all charges against the two voters and ordered the Crown to pay their court costs.

===== 2016 =====
Mirabella gained Liberal party preselection in late June 2015 to run for Indi in the 2016 federal election. However, McGowan retained Indi against Mirabella with an increased 54.8% (+4.6) two-candidate-preferred vote. Mirabella conceded to McGowan on 3 July 2016. Notably, the Liberal two-party-preferred vote in a "traditional" two-party contest against Labor was reduced to 54.4% (–4.7) against Labor's 45.6% (+4.7), a marginal two-party result not seen since the 1929 election.

In the lead-up to the 2016 federal election, McGowan was present at a function at a Benalla nursing home along with Sophie Mirabella. Both were candidates for the Division of Indi. It was subsequently reported on 20 April 2016 by journalist Libby Price in the Benalla Ensign that Mirabella had pushed McGowan at this meeting. McGowan was interviewed soon after the event and refused to confirm or deny the allegation. She was interviewed by The Border Mail and refused on four occasions to answer as to whether she had been pushed or not. The Benalla Ensign issued an apology on 26 October 2016 and stated that Mirabella did not push McGowan. Mirabella launched defamation proceedings against the Benalla Ensign and its editor Price. The case was heard in the Victorian County Court in Wangaratta in early May 2018. McGowan was called as a witness in the case and gave evidence that Mirabella did not push her. The court found in favour of Mirabella that she had been defamed by the Benalla Ensign and Price.

Mirabella alleged on the campaign trail that the Wangaratta Hospital, located in Indi, had lost out on funds because she had not been elected in 2013. McGowan then lobbied the government to investigate if Mirabella's comments were accurate and, if so, to restore the proposed funding.

===== 2019 =====
On 14 January 2019, McGowan announced she would not be recontesting Indi at the next election. On 18 May 2019, her preferred independent candidate, Helen Haines, claimed victory in the federal election.

=== Member for Indi (2013-2019) ===
==== Committees ====
As an MP, McGowan served on the House Standing Committee on Agriculture and Industry from 2013 to 2016, and the Infrastructure, Transport and Cities Committee from 2016 to 2019 (additionally serving as a member of the Joint Standing Committee into the NBN at the same period). She was also a member of the Joint Statutory Human Rights Committee from 2015 to 2016, the House Select Committee into Regional Development and Decentralisation from 2017 to 2018, and was a member of the Joint Select Committee investigating the constitutional recognition of Indigenous Australians in 2018.

McGowan's electorate office in Wodonga, 2019.

Confidence and Supply

After the 2016 Election, McGowan gave the Coalition government confidence and supply support in the event of a hung parliament, but ruled out becoming Speaker of the House to boost the Coalition's majority in the house. She vowed to negotiate on a case-by-case basis with bills in the event a minority government. During the 2018 Liberal Leadership crisis, she was ambiguous about supporting Peter Dutton, but later offered confidence and supply to Scott Morrison stating that "now was not the time for further disruption" During her second term, the Coalition Government lost its majority by October 2018 due to a by-election loss, and McGowan became a crucial swing vote.

==== Federal Integrity ====
After the Coalition Government lost its majority in November 2018, McGowan proposed the creation of an Australian National Integrity Commission to investigate public sector corruption. The bill lapsed at the disillusion of parliament in 2019. A version using McGowan's proposal as a blueprint was introduced by Senator Larissa Waters, around the same time but similarly lapsed in 2021. McGowan introduced a companion bill to establish a statutory basis for the registers of interests, a code of conduct for parliamentarians and staffers, and the establishment of an Independent Parliamentary Standards Commissioner and a Parliamentary Integrity Advisor.

In the wake of revelations about Barnaby Joyce and his relationship with a former staffer, McGowan suggested banning federal politicians from having intimate relations with their staffers, stating that "Good workplace practice includes clear expectations about behaviour". Her proposal received backing from Bob Katter in principle, but was opposed by the Coalition government.

==== Rural Affairs ====
In her first term, McGowan introduced a bill, seconded by Andrew Wilkie, to amend to the Charter of Budget Honest Act 1998, which would mandate the government to release a regional impact statement with every federal budget.

During her second term, McGowan advocated for the creation of a Regional, Rural and Remote Education Commissioner, introducing a bill to create the position in June 2018. In February 2019 she co-introduced a bill with Rebekha Sharkie, to create the Office for Regional Australia, modelled on the Productivity Commission.

After the 2016 Election, McGowan gave the Coalition government confidence and supply support in the event of a hung parliament, but ruled out becoming Speaker of the House to boost the Coalition's majority in the house.

==== Social Issues ====
A consistent supporter of Same-Sex Marriage in parliament. McGowan, along with fellow crossbencher Andrew Wilkie, preferred a free vote in parliament on the issue as opposed to plebiscite. She backed bills in 2015, 2016 and 2017 to legalise it. (the seat of Indi would endorse same-sex marriage by 63% to 36% in the Australian Marriage Law Postal Survey)

Due to her outspoken support for gay marriage, she had an offer to deliver the Mary MacKillop Oration by Catholic Social Services Victoria, withdrawn. McGowan, then a practising catholic, responded that she was saddened and the decision was widely criticised. McGowan stated that the decision was a factor in her decision to leave the Catholic Church.

==== Immigration ====
Regarding the immigration system, McGowan says it must respect international law.

McGowan voted in favour of a censure motion against Peter Dutton for comments he made, in which he allegedly implied that a baby was deliberately harmed in order to facilitate asylum seeker access to Australia. The motion failed, with only McGowan, and two other crossbenchers voting in favour.

In 2018, McGowan was one of only three MPs to vote against the Migration (Validation of Port Appointment) Bill which sought to retrospectively declare the Ashmore Reef a port, after the federal court ruled a prior declaration by the Howard Government invalid. The decision could have resulted in significant compensation to people detained unlawfully.

Two months before departing parliament, McGowan voted in favour of amendments to the Home Affairs Legislation Amendment (Miscellaneous Measures) that gave Doctors more say over medical transfers of asylum seekers in offshore detention. The Coalition government opposed the bill but it passed the lower house with the support of Labor. The first time a sitting government lost a legislative vote since 1941.

==== Environment ====
McGowan supports a price on Carbon, and voted against repealing the Carbon Pricing Scheme.

== Retirement ==
McGowan has continued to comment on Australian politics broadly. In the run up to the 2022 federal election, she provided support to numerous Community Independent groups, also known as "Teal Independents" many of whom cited McGowan and the Indi campaign as inspiration for their candidacies

In October 2026, McGowan's successor in Indi, Helen Haines was critically injured in an attack at her electorate office. In the aftermath she attended a community rally for Haines, and called for the community to "call out bad behaviour, stop the violence."

== See also ==
- List of grassroots political engagement groups in Australia
- Voices for Indi

Parliament of Australia
Preceded by Sophie Mirabella	Member for Indi; 2013–2019	Succeeded by Helen Haines
