= Greg Mirabella =

Australian politician

Senator for Victoria
- In office 2 December 2021 – 30 June 2022
- Preceded by: Scott Ryan
- Succeeded by: Ralph Babet

Personal details
- Born: 5 July 1960 (age 65) Werribee, Victoria, Australia
- Party: Liberal Party of Australia
- Spouse: Sophie Panopoulos (m. 2006)
- Profession: Politician, farmer

Gregory Francis Mirabella (born 5 July 1960) is an Australian politician and farmer who was a Senator for Victoria from December 2021 to June 2022, representing the Liberal Party. He is the husband of former federal MP Sophie Mirabella. His term ended on 30 June 2022, as he failed to be elected at the 2022 federal election. From August 2022 to September 2023 he was President of the Liberal Party of Australia (Victorian Division).

== Personal life ==
Mirabella was born in Werribee, in the western suburbs of Melbourne, and was educated at Marcellin College. During the weekends and school holidays, he spent time on family fishing boats in the Bass Strait and milking cows in northern Victoria. Mirabella later joined the army and was an officer in the Australian Army Reserve. He was also an engineer and a volunteer firefighter.

In June 2006, Mirabella married federal lower house MP Sophie Panopoulos, who took on her husband's surname. Sophie was appointed a Commissioner on the Fair Work Commission in May 2021. The couple have two daughters. Since 2005, the couple has been producing beef cattle at their family farm in East Wangaratta, and Greg has been active in the Victorian Farmers Federation.

== Political life ==
In April 2017, Mirabella was elected as country vice-president of the Victorian division of the Liberal Party. In September 2019, he ran for Liberal preselection to fill the Senate casual vacancy caused by the resignation of Mitch Fifield, but was defeated by former lower house MP Sarah Henderson.

In November 2021, Mirabella was preselected by the Liberal Party to fill the casual vacancy caused by the resignation of Scott Ryan. This also placed Mirabella on the potentially winnable third position on the Coalition Senate ticket for Victoria for the 2022 federal election, defeating Simon Frost in a ballot, 165–141. This was seen as a blow to deputy Liberal leader Josh Frydenberg, as Frost was an of ally Frydenberg.

Mirabella was formally appointed to the Senate at a joint sitting of the Victorian Parliament on 2 December 2021. His appointment meant that he and his wife Sophie were the fourth married couple to serve in federal parliament, but he was the first husband to follow his wife into federal parliament.

Mirabella was placed third on the Coalition Senate ticket for Victoria in the 2022 Australian federal election. He was not successful in his re-election, losing out to United Australian Party's candidate Ralph Babet.

In August 2022 Mirabella was elected, unopposed, to the Presidency of the Liberal Party of Australia (Victorian Division) at the 169th State Council.

He did not stand again at the 171st State Council in September 2023 and was succeeded by Philip Davis.

=== Views ===
Prior to his appointment as a senator, Mirabella said that his two priorities were to amend the Murray–Darling Basin Plan and "changing the way Australians debate and approach climate change". He is an advocate for hydrogen investment.
