= Roger Shipton =

Australian politician (1936–1998)

Roger Shipton OAM

Member of the Australian Parliament for Higgins
- In office 13 December 1975 – 19 February 1990
- Preceded by: John Gorton
- Succeeded by: Peter Costello

Personal details
- Born: 5 August 1936 Melbourne, Victoria, Australia
- Died: 18 January 1998 (aged 61) Melbourne, Victoria, Australia
- Party: Liberal Party of Australia

Roger Francis Shipton OAM (5 August 1936 – 18 January 1998) was an Australian politician. He was a member of the Liberal Party and served in the House of Representatives from 1975 to 1990, representing the Melbourne seat of Higgins.

== Early life ==
Shipton was born in Melbourne on 5 August 1936. He graduated Bachelor of Laws from the University of Melbourne and was president of the Victorian Law Students' Society. Prior to entering parliament he was chief legal officer of chemical manufacturer ICI Australia.

== Politics ==
Shipton was a delegate to the Victorian state council of the Liberal Party from 1962 and served on the state executive from 1973 to 1976.

In 1975 he succeeded former Prime Minister Sir John Gorton as the Liberal Party member of the Australian House of Representatives for the Division of Higgins. Unlike his predecessors in that electorate, Gorton and Harold Holt, who had both served as Prime Minister, he was never promoted to cabinet, though he did serve in the opposition shadow ministry from 1983 to 1985.

In the lead up to the 1990 Federal Election it was suggested that he would stand aside to allow John Elliott to take his seat, and the leadership of the Federal Liberal Party, but he declined to make way for Elliott and remained the member for Higgins.

Despite his stand he was successfully challenged for pre-selection by future Treasurer Peter Costello with support from Michael Kroger. He retired from parliament after being defeated. He died in 1998 due to complications following heart surgery.

== Personal life ==
Shipton's son James became chairman of the Australian Securities & Investments Commission (ASIC). He was also the godfather of Van Halen lead singer David Lee Roth.

Parliament of Australia
Preceded by John Gorton	Member for Higgins; 1975–1990	Succeeded by Peter Costello
