= Michelle Ananda-Rajah =

Australian politician (born 1972)

Senator Michelle Ananda-Rajah
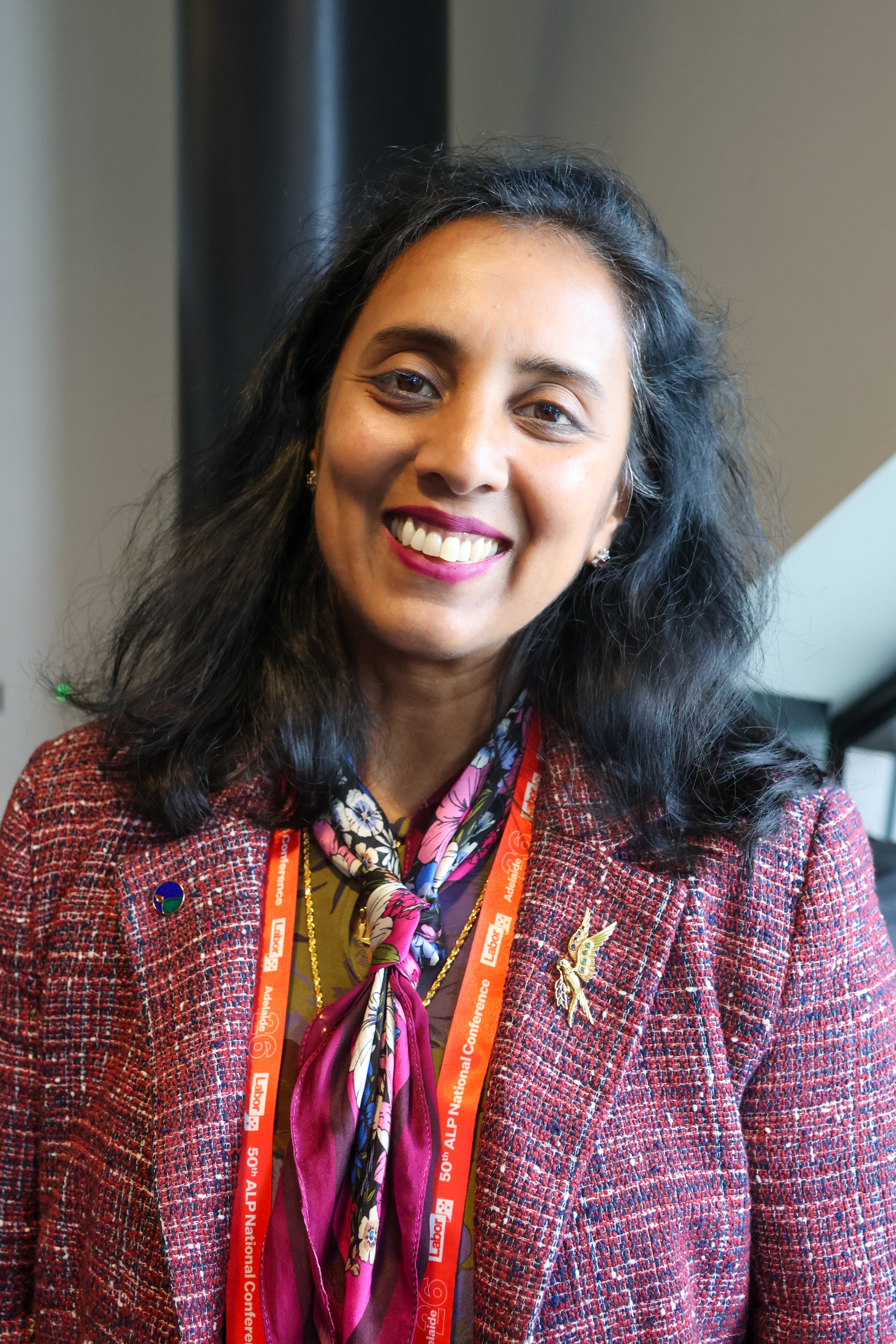
- Ananda-Rajah in 2026

Senator for Victoria
- Incumbent
- Assumed office 1 July 2025
- Preceded by: David Van

Member of the Australian Parliament for Higgins
- In office 21 May 2022 – 28 March 2025
- Preceded by: Katie Allen
- Succeeded by: Division abolished

Personal details
- Born: 10 December 1972 (age 53) London, England
- Party: Labor
- Education: University of Melbourne (PhD); University of Sydney (MBBS (Hons))
- Profession: Medical doctor

Michelle Renuka Ananda-Rajah (Tamil: மிசேல் ஆனந்தராஜா; born 10 December 1972) is an Australian politician who is a senator for Victoria since July 2025. A member of the Australian Labor Party (ALP), she previously served as the member for Higgins in the House of Representatives from 2022 to 2025. After Higgins was abolished due to a redistribution, Ananda-Rajah was elected to the Senate from the 3rd place on the Labor ticket in the 2025 federal election. Her six-year term began on 1 July 2025.

Prior to entering politics, she was a clinician-scientist, and infectious diseases physician.

== Early life ==
Ananda-Rajah was born in London to Sri Lankan Tamil parents who had fled from Sri Lanka in the early 1970s prior to the Sri Lankan Civil War. She lived in Zambia for 11 years until she moved to Australia as a child. Ananda-Rajah became an Australian citizen in 1996. She renounced her British citizenship in 2021.

Ananda-Rajah obtained her bachelor's degree in medicine and surgery (MBBS) in 1997 and her PhD in 2014 from the University of Sydney.

== Career ==
Ananda-Rajah worked as a clinician-researcher and physician in infectious diseases and general medicine at Alfred Health for 13 years. She is a graduate of University of Sydney with honours and underwent speciality training in Victoria. In 2019, she was awarded a TRIP (Translating Research Into Practice) fellowship by the Medical Research Future Fund and appointed to JAMA Network Open as a statistical and methods reviewer.

Ananda-Rajah has published over 50 scientific papers and held several editorial roles in medical journals.

Ananda-Rajah is the co-founder of Healthcare Workers Australia, a grass roots advocacy group which has campaigned since August 2020 for improved respiratory protection.

== Political career ==
Ananda-Rajah was preselected as the Labor candidate for Higgins in July 2021, ahead of the 2022 Australian federal election. She trailed Liberal incumbent Katie Allen for most of the night. However, on the seventh count, the Green candidate's preferences flowed overwhelmingly to Ananda-Rajah. This gave Ananda-Rajah a 2.4% swing in primary vote and a 4.6% swing in two party preferred vote, to win the seat with a two party preferred vote of 52%, or a little under 4,000 votes. By winning, Ananda-Rajah became the first Labor member for Higgins in the seat's 73-year history.

Ananda-Rajah is the co-chair of the Parliamentary Friends of Electric Vehicles alongside Member for Kooyong Monique Ryan, and co-chair of the Parliamentary Friends of Men's Health alongside Member for Nicholls Sam Birrell. Ananda-Rajah serves on the Procedure Committee, the Health, Aged Care and Sport Committee, and the Public Accounts and Audit Committee.

Since becoming elected, Ananda-Rajah has driven efforts within the Albanese Government to prioritise indoor air quality and clean air in combatting infectious disease and other adverse health impacts. On 30 March 2023, Ananda-Rajah co-chaired a Clean Air Forum featuring Australian Chief Health Officer Professor Paul Kelly and former Victorian Chief Health Officer Brett Sutton.

On 5 September 2024, the Australian Electoral Commission announced its determination that the electorate of Higgins would be abolished at the next Federal election. As a result of the abolishment, Ananda-Rajah then sought election for the senate at the 2025 federal election and was preselected as a candidate third on the Victorian Labor senate ticket. She was elected to the Senate at the election, and began her term on 1 July 2025.

In February 2026 during a late-night Senate estimates hearing, Ananda-Rajah and Liberal Senator Sarah Henderson traded heated verbal blows over a taxpayer-funded documentary about Brittany Higgins titled Silenced.

== Political views ==
Michelle Ananda-Rajah is a member of the TWU-aligned Labor Right faction.

=== Middle East ===
In July 2023, Ananda-Rajah travelled to Israel with Speaker of the House of Representatives Milton Dick as part of bipartisan Australian Parliamentary Delegation to Israel and the Palestinian Territories in which they met members of the Knesset on national security, judicial reform, gender equity, climate change and innovation. During that trip She said "Our cultural and historic ties with Israel run deep and we look forward to strengthening the relationship".

Later in December 2023, Ananda-Rajah travelled to Israel following the October 7 attacks. Her travel and hospitality were funded by AIJAC.

In May 2024, in Temple Beth Israel in Melbourne, Ananda-Rajah criticized the Australian government's UN vote in favour of a UN General Assembly Draft Resolution to urge the UN Security Council to recognise the State of Palestine, elevating the Palestinian Authority, saying she felt "very conflicted" and that she “had a conversation” with Foreign Minister Penny Wong after the vote.

In July 2024, In an interview with ABC she criticised senator Fatima Payman for crossing the floor in favour of immediately recognising a Palestinian state, contrary to Labor party policy that recognition should come as part of progress towards a two-state solution.

In August 2025, Ananda-Rajah condemned the actions of the Netanyahu government, saying that she would not 'rubber stamp what the Netanyahu government is doing', calling the Gaza humanitarian crisis 'a humanitarian catastrophe.'. However, she stopped short of describing it as a genocide.

== Personal life ==
Ananda-Rajah lives in Melbourne with her husband and two children. She is the largest property owner in the Parliament, owning seven residential/investment properties.

Parliament of Australia
Preceded by Katie Allen	Member for Higgins; 2022–2025	Division abolished
