= Jason Ball (activist) =

Australian rules footballer and activist

Jason Ball OAM
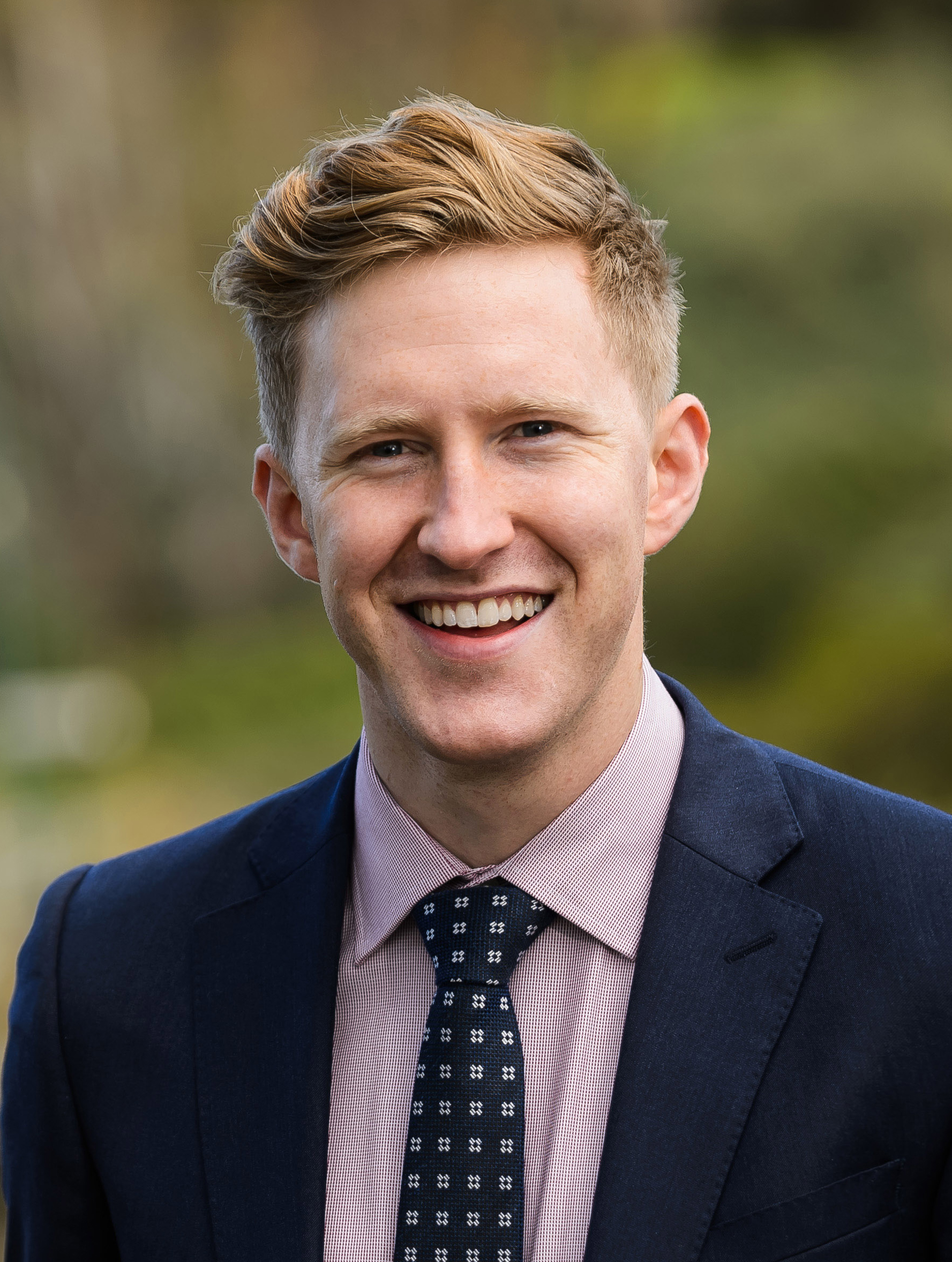
- Education: University of Melbourne
- Political party: Greens
- Website: jasonball.com.au

Jason Ball is an Australian LGBTI and mental health advocate. He is a former Australian rules footballer at local level, and former political candidate for the Australian Greens in the seat of Higgins at the 2016 Federal election and 2019 Federal election.

== Background and early life ==
Ball attended high school at Yarra Valley Grammar and completed a Bachelor of Arts at the University of Melbourne in 2010. He played for the Yarra Glen Football Club in the Yarra Valley Mountain District Football League until taking time off in 2015 due to injury.

Ball credits his rural upbringing for fostering an interest in protecting the environment, and a high school exchange to Kansas for awakening an interest in critical thinking, philosophy, and secularism.

== Activism ==
=== AFL anti-homophobia campaign ===
In 2012, Ball came out as gay, and launched a campaign to tackle homophobia in Australian rules football. He started a petition on change.org on 9 September 2012 that called on the Australian Football League (AFL) to play "No to Homophobia" television commercials on the big screen of the 2012 AFL Grand Final and also commit to a Pride Round. The petition received over 29,000 signatures and gained national and international media coverage. The AFL agreed to screen the No to Homophobia TVCs during the preliminary finals that year. The AFLW Pride Round has since been established by the AFLW, supported by all 18 clubs in the women's league; however as of November 2023 the men's league had no plans to introduce a Pride Round in the men's game.

Ball was invited to lead the 18th Pride March Victoria alongside his teammates from the Yarra Glen Football Club. They were also joined by AFL footballers Brock McLean and Daniel Jackson, marking the first time AFL players had been formally involved in the event.

In 2013, Ball partnered with the AFL Players Association to launch a social media campaign tackling homophobic language in sport, featuring some of the AFL's biggest names, including Jobe Watson, Scott Pendlebury and Andrew Swallow.

=== Pride Cup / Pride Game ===
On 3 May 2014, Ball's team Yarra Glen hosted the inaugural Pride Cup, which saw the 50-metre lines at each end of the oval painted in rainbow colours. The AFL supported the event by hosting a pre-match function, and General Manager of Football Operations Mark Evans announced that the AFL would support a national Pride Cup, and that it was up to clubs to show interest.

As part of the 2015 Pride Cup, an education program was developed to help players and coaches challenge homophobia in sport. The organisers behind the 2015 Cup were awarded a VicHealth Award for building health through sport on 1 December 2015.

In August 2015 St Kilda Football Club CEO Matt Finnis announced that the club would lobby the AFL for a Pride Game for the 2016 fixture, inspired by Yarra Glen's Pride Cup. It was confirmed in October 2015 that the first AFL Pride Game would be contested between St Kilda and Sydney in round 21 of the 2016 season. This led to the establishment of the annual AFL Pride Game.

Pride Cup is an organisation dedicated to advocating for the LGBTQIA+ community in Australian sport. The idea spread to other codes, including hockey, roller derby, lawn bowls, netball, and water polo. as of 2024, there are more than 515 clubs involved in a Pride Cup event. Pride Cup connects with community clubs to help them run their Pride Cup matches, as well as running education sessions.

=== Mental health and LGBTI inclusion ===
In 2013, Ball became an ambassador for beyondblue, the Australian national mental health initiative. In this role he has spoken to schools, sporting clubs and workplaces across the country.

From 2014 to 2015, Ball was an ambassador for Safe Schools Coalition Australia, an organisation which aims to make schools safer and more inclusive for LGBTI students.

Ball worked as a Government Liaison and Project Officer for the Young and Well Cooperative Research Centre from 2014 to 2015, a non-profit organisation that explores the role of technology in improving the mental health of young people.

Now based in London, Ball was appointed Executive Director of GiveOut on 1 April 2025. GiveOut is an international LGBTQI community foundation dedicated to expanding philanthropy in support of LGBTQI human rights worldwide. Ball had previously served as the organisation’s Head of Grant-making.

=== Secularism ===
Ball was an organiser and spokesperson for the 2010 and 2012 Global Atheist Conventions held in Melbourne, Victoria. He presented at the 2012 convention with a talk titled A Fresh Generation of Freethinkers is Among Us. He was also the co-founder and President of the Freethought Student Alliance, a coalition of Australian atheist, secular, humanist and skeptic campus groups.

== Political candidacy ==
On 10 August 2015, Ball announced that he was standing as the Greens candidate for the House of Representatives seat of Higgins at the 2016 Federal election, against Kelly O'Dwyer. He stated he wanted his campaign to focus on climate change, asylum seeker policy, science, and mental health.

The 2016 result in Higgins saw an 8.5% increase in the Greens vote, with a two party preferred outcome of 58% Liberal compared to 42% Greens.

On 4 May 2018, Ball announced that he would re-contest the seat of Higgins at the 2019 Federal election.

On 20 January 2019, Kelly O'Dwyer announced she would quit politics and not re-contest the seat of Higgins at the next election. O'Dwyer was replaced by paediatrician Katie Allen on 24 February 2019.

On 22 March 2019, the Labor Party replaced their Higgins candidate with high-profile barrister Fiona McLeod, following reports of polling that showed the Liberals could lose Higgins.

The 2019 result in Higgins saw an 8.5% increase in Labor's vote and a 3.7% drop in the Liberal vote. The Greens vote decreased slightly by 1.7%. The two party preferred outcome was 54% Liberal compared to 46% Labor, with Katie Allen being elected as the new member for Higgins.

== Awards and recognition ==
Ball was included in The Age's Top 100 most influential Melburnians of 2012 and was amongst The Advocate's Top 25 Most Notable Comings Out of 2012.

He was named LGBTI Sports Person of the Year at the second annual GLOBE Community Awards in 2015. The awards recognise outstanding contributions and achievements in the LGBTI community in Victoria. He was also a finalist for LGBTI Person of the Year at the same event.

Pop culture and news website Junkee included Ball in "The Disruptors", their list of thirty people "changing the game for young Australia". Ball was also featured in Executive Style magazine's list of "The 10 men who mattered in Australia in 2015".

In May 2016, the University of Melbourne presented Ball with the Arts Alumni Rising Star Award recognising his "outstanding level of personal achievement and community involvement". Further, the Council of Australian Humanist Societies honoured Jason's advocacy within mental health and LGBTI equality by naming him the Young Australian Humanist of the Year for 2016.

In 2017, Ball was named the Young Australian of the Year for Victoria, and he received the Out Role Model Award in the inaugural Pride in Sport Awards.

In 2024, Ball was appointed a Medal (OAM) of the Order of Australia for his work on social inclusion initiatives.
