= Katie Allen (politician) =

Australian politician (1966–2025)

Katie Allen AO FAHMS
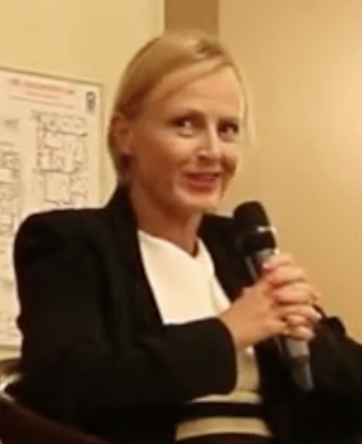
- Allen in 2018

Member of the Australian Parliament for Higgins
- In office 18 May 2019 – 21 May 2022
- Preceded by: Kelly O'Dwyer
- Succeeded by: Michelle Ananda-Rajah

Personal details
- Born: Katrina Jane Stephens; 24 February 1966 Albury, New South Wales, Australia
- Died: 23 December 2025 (aged 59) Melbourne, Victoria, Australia
- Party: Liberal
- Spouse: Malcolm Allen
- Children: 4
- Education: Monash University; University of Melbourne
- Occupation: Medical researcher

Katrina Jane Allen (24 February 1966 – 23 December 2025) was an Australian medical researcher and politician. She was a member of the House of Representatives from 2019 to 2022, representing the seat of Higgins in Victoria for the Liberal Party. Prior to her political career she was a paediatric allergist and gastroenterologist at the Royal Children's Hospital in Melbourne and served as director of the Centre of Food and Allergy Research at the Murdoch Children's Research Institute.

== Early life ==
Allen was born on 24 February 1966 in Albury, New South Wales. She grew up in country New South Wales and went to boarding school at Melbourne Girls Grammar.

Allen's father was born on Ocean Island in the British colony of Gilbert and Ellice Islands (present-day Kiribati). She held British citizenship by descent until March 2019 when she renounced it to run for parliament. Her mother was the secretary of the Albury branch of the Liberal Party. Her mother's side of the family are one of the most prominent winemaking families in Australia, with six generations making wine in the Rutherglen region.

Allen studied medicine at Monash University, also undertaking research at the University of Cambridge, and subsequently trained as a doctor at the Alfred Hospital. She completed a PhD degree at the University of Melbourne in 2002. Her doctoral thesis, Liver cell transplantation using a mouse model of Wilson's disease, was on the use of liver cell transplantation to treat Wilson's disease.

Allen was one of eleven MPs in the 46th Parliament of Australia to hold a PhD degree, the others being Jim Chalmers, Fiona Martin, Anne Aly, Andrew Leigh, Daniel Mulino, Jess Walsh, Adam Bandt, Mehreen Faruqi, Anne Webster and Helen Haines.

== Medical research career ==
From 1998, Allen was employed as a paediatric allergist and gastroenterologist at the Royal Children's Hospital in Melbourne. After completing a PhD at the University of Melbourne in the development of liver cell transplantation as an alternative to whole organ transplantation, Allen undertook Australia's first liver cell transplantation in 2004, which was unsuccessful. She subsequently provided scientific evidence that liver cell transplantation was not yet ready for long-term clinical application. She held professorial rank at the University of Melbourne and the University of Manchester. In 2013 she was appointed director of the Centre of Food and Allergy Research at the Murdoch Children's Research Institute (MCRI). Allen was the principal investigator for the MCRI's "HealthNuts" study, which is "the largest single-centre population based study of food allergy in children ever mounted". The study tracks 5,300 children who were diagnosed with food allergies as infants.

Allen advocated for a wide range of preventive health care initiatives including better food labelling to help keep people with food allergies safe, dubbing Melbourne as "unfortunately the food allergy capital of the world". Allen also led the national standardisation of Infant Feeding Guidelines in Australia.

In 2016, Allen was involved in research undertaken at MCRI which described a link between Asian migration to Australia and increased risk of food allergy. In 2017 she was featured on SBS Insight when she carried out Australia's first paediatric faecal microbial transplant.

Outside her research, Allen served as chair of the Melbourne Girls Grammar School council and as a director of Cabrini Health, a non-profit Catholic healthcare service.

In 2015, Allen was elected an inaugural fellow of the Australian Academy of Health and Medical Sciences. She was appointed an Officer of the Order of Australia posthumously in the 2026 King's Birthday Honours in recognition of her "distinguished service to medical research as a paediatric allergist and gastroenterologist, and to the people and Parliament of Australia".

== Political career ==
=== State politics ===
Allen was the Liberal candidate in Prahran at the 2018 Victorian state election, losing to the incumbent Greens MP, Sam Hibbins. With Allen as the candidate, there was a 10.3% swing away from the Liberal party for the seat of Prahran. Allen's husband was the one to suggest that she run for state election.

=== Federal politics ===
==== 2019 election ====
In February 2019, Allen won preselection for the Division of Higgins, replacing the retiring Liberal MP, Kelly O'Dwyer. She retained the seat for the Liberals at the 2019 federal election despite a six percent swing, enough to drop the Liberal majority to 53 percent, making Higgins a marginal seat for the first time. Notably, she was the first Liberal candidate in Higgins to come up short of a majority on the first count, like several blue ribbon Liberal seats in inner cities around Australia.

==== Parliamentary term ====
Allen was sworn in as the member for Higgins at the opening of the 46th Parliament in Canberra, making her first speech on 29 July 2019. In the speech, Allen noted familial ties to Margaret Bondfield who was a British suffragette and the UK's first female cabinet minister as Minister for Labour.

Allen served on the National COVID-19 Health and Research Advisory Committee, working to provide advice on Australia's health response to the COVID-19 pandemic to the Commonwealth Chief Medical Officer.

Allen sat on the Parliamentary Standing Committees for Trade and Investment; the National Broadband Network; the Parliamentary Library; Industry, Innovation, Science and Resources and Communications and the Arts, and was a member of the National Redress Scheme Implementation Committee and Working Group on Indigenous Recognition. Allen visited PNG in August 2019 as part of a Parliamentary tour hosted by the Save the Children and Gates Foundation in the context of the Morrison government Pacific Step.

Allen was co-convenor of the Parliamentary Friends of UNICEF, Parliamentary Friends of Child and Adolescent Health, Parliamentary Friends of Hemochromatosis, Parliamentary Friends of Young People and Parliamentary Friends of Cancer Care and Cure.

==== 2022 election ====
Allen was defeated at the 2022 Australian federal election by Labor's Michelle Ananda-Rajah with a 4.67% swing away from the Liberal vote.

Allen was the first Liberal candidate to lose the seat of Higgins since its creation in 1949, making Ananda-Rajah the first Labor MP for Higgins.

==== 2025 candidacy ====
In November 2023, Allen was preselected as the Liberal candidate for Higgins for the 2025 federal election. Following the abolition of the Higgins electorate in 2024, Allen replaced the preselected Liberal candidate, Theo Zographos, as the candidate for Chisholm. Zographos was a Chisholm local and former councillor at Monash Council. He had been preselected unopposed and had been actively campaigning since 2023. The move by Allen and the Liberal Party federal executive was reported to have caused anger among the local Liberal party branch members.

== Political positions ==
As of 2021, Allen was a member of the moderate faction of the Parliamentary Liberal Party.

Beyond health, Allen advocated within the Liberal Party for stronger action on climate change.

Allen was a long-time advocate for nuclear energy in Australia. She advocated for nuclear energy in her first speech to Parliament. In 2019, she wrote an opinion piece in The Sydney Morning Herald called "Keep an open mind about nuclear power for our carbon-neutral future". In 2020 she told the Guardian Australia that the country needed to consider nuclear energy.

Allen was vocal on the need for education reform to support high achievers, support for rural GPs, Labor's Medevac law, the prospect of tax on sugar-sweetened beverages, the Liberal Party's Job Ready Graduate program, and support for LGBT rights.

Allen was critical of anti-Zionism and visited Israel in 2019 on a study trip paid for by the Australia/Israel & Jewish Affairs Council.

On 10 February 2022, Allen crossed the floor with four other Liberal MPs for an amendment to the Sex Discrimination Act 1984 to include protection for transgender students. However, reports said that Allen, together with fellow Liberal MP Dave Sharma, agreed to only cross the floor if their votes would not be decisive in defeating the government on the issue. Allen did not join fellow Liberals Trent Zimmerman and Bridget Archer in crossing the floor against the bill's controversial statements of belief clause. Ultimately, Allen voted in favour of the final reading of the bill.

== Personal life and death ==
Allen had four children with her husband Malcolm. They settled in the Melbourne suburb of Toorak in 2004.

On 8 May 2025, having unsuccessfully contested the Division of Chisholm at the federal election the previous week, Allen announced that she had been diagnosed with cholangiocarcinoma, a cancer of the bile duct. Allen had been diagnosed in November 2023, but chose not to disclose it while campaigning to return to Parliament.

Allen died from cholangiocarcinoma in Melbourne on 23 December 2025 at the age of 59.

Parliament of Australia
Preceded by Kelly O'Dwyer	Member for Higgins; 2019–2022	Succeeded by Michelle Ananda-Rajah
