= Benalla Ensign =

Weekly newspaper in Victoria, Australia

The Benalla Ensign is a weekly newspaper that has been published in Benalla, Victoria, Australia since 1868. It currently has a weekly circulation of 36,904 and provides mostly local news with a strong emphasis on the results of local sports teams and local classified ads.

== History ==
The Benalla Ensign first began publication as the Benalla Ensign and Farmer's and Squatter's Journal in 1868. The original proprietor was John Liston. This was superseded by the North Eastern Ensign in April 1872 and was published under this title until February 1938 when it returned to the original name. The owners from 1887 to 1977 were the O'Shea family, who then sold the newspaper to Geoff Adams. In July 1986 the current owners McPherson Media Group bought it.

== See also ==
- List of newspapers in Australia
