= Division of Higgins =

Australian federal electoral division

Coordinates: 37.859°S 145.047°E

Higgins Australian House of Representatives Division
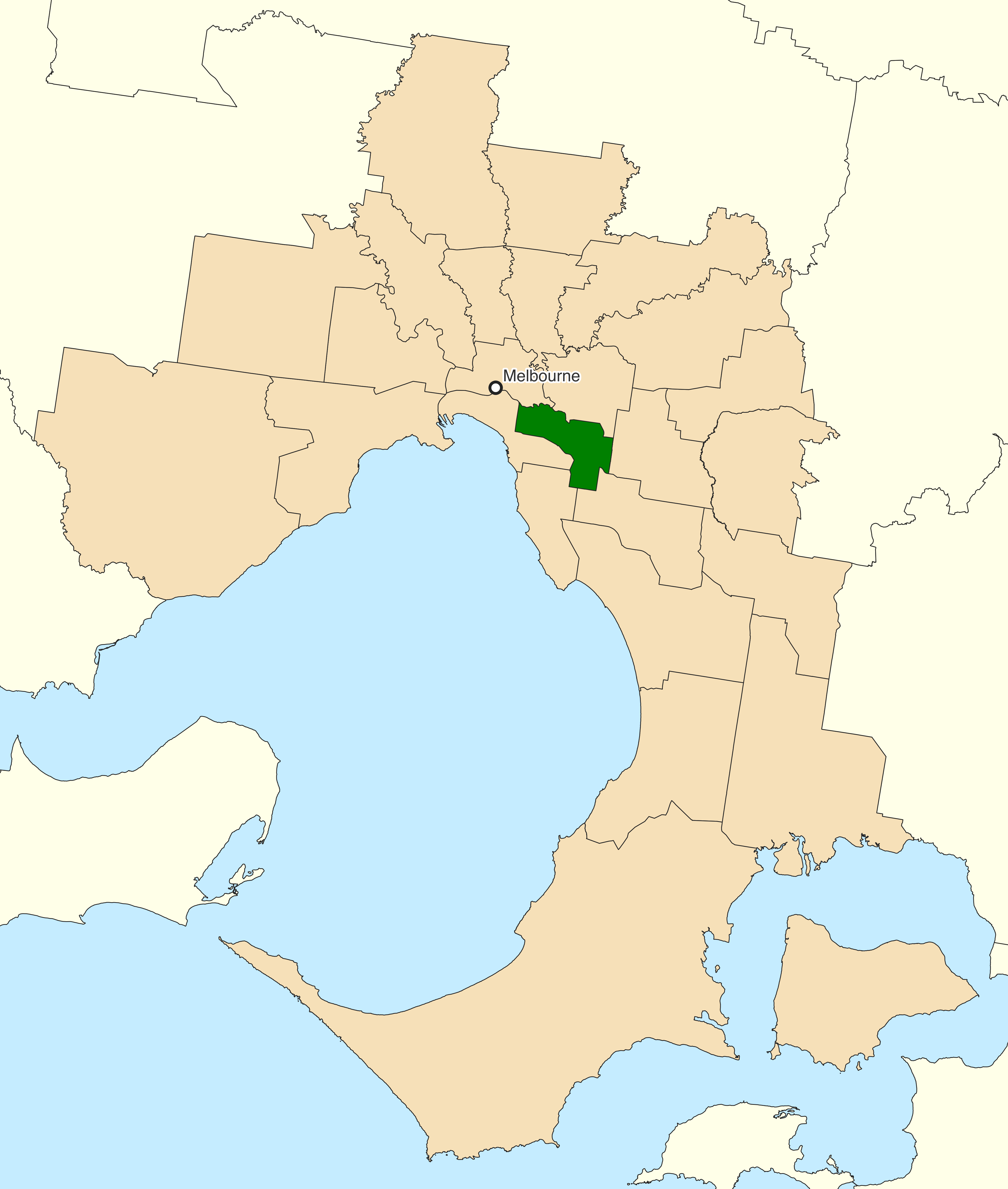
- Division of Higgins in Victoria, as of the 2022 federal election
- Created: 1949
- Abolished: 2025
- Namesake: H. B. Higgins
- Electors: 107,782 (2022)
- Area: 39 km^{2} (15.1 sq mi)
- Demographic: Inner metropolitan

The Division of Higgins was an Australian Electoral Division in Victoria for the Australian House of Representatives from 1949 until 2025. At the time of its abolition in 2025, the division covered 41 km^{2} (16 mi^{2}) in Melbourne's inner south-eastern suburbs. The main suburbs included Armadale, Ashburton, Carnegie, Glen Iris, Kooyong, Malvern, Malvern East, Murrumbeena, Prahran and Toorak; along with parts of Camberwell, Ormond and South Yarra. Though historically a safe conservative seat, Higgins was won by the Liberal Party by a margin of just 3.9 percent over the Labor Party at the 2019 election, the closest result in the seat’s history. It then flipped to Labor in the 2022 election.

Higgins was a largely white-collar electorate. According to the 2021 census, 52.4% of electors held a Bachelor's Degree, slightly more than twice the national average.

The last member for Higgins, elected at the 2022 federal election, was Michelle Ananda-Rajah, a member of the Australian Labor Party, and the first Labor member in the seat's history.

In 2024, the Australian Electoral Commission announced that the seat would be abolished in the Victorian federal electorate redistribution, effective from the 2025 Australian federal election, with its electors distributed across the divisions of Melbourne, Kooyong, Hotham, Macnamara and Chisholm.

== Geography ==
Since 1984, federal electoral division boundaries in Australia have been determined at redistributions by a redistribution committee appointed by the Australian Electoral Commission. Redistributions occur for the boundaries of divisions in a particular state, and they occur every seven years, or sooner if a state's representation entitlement changes or when divisions of a state are malapportioned.

== History ==
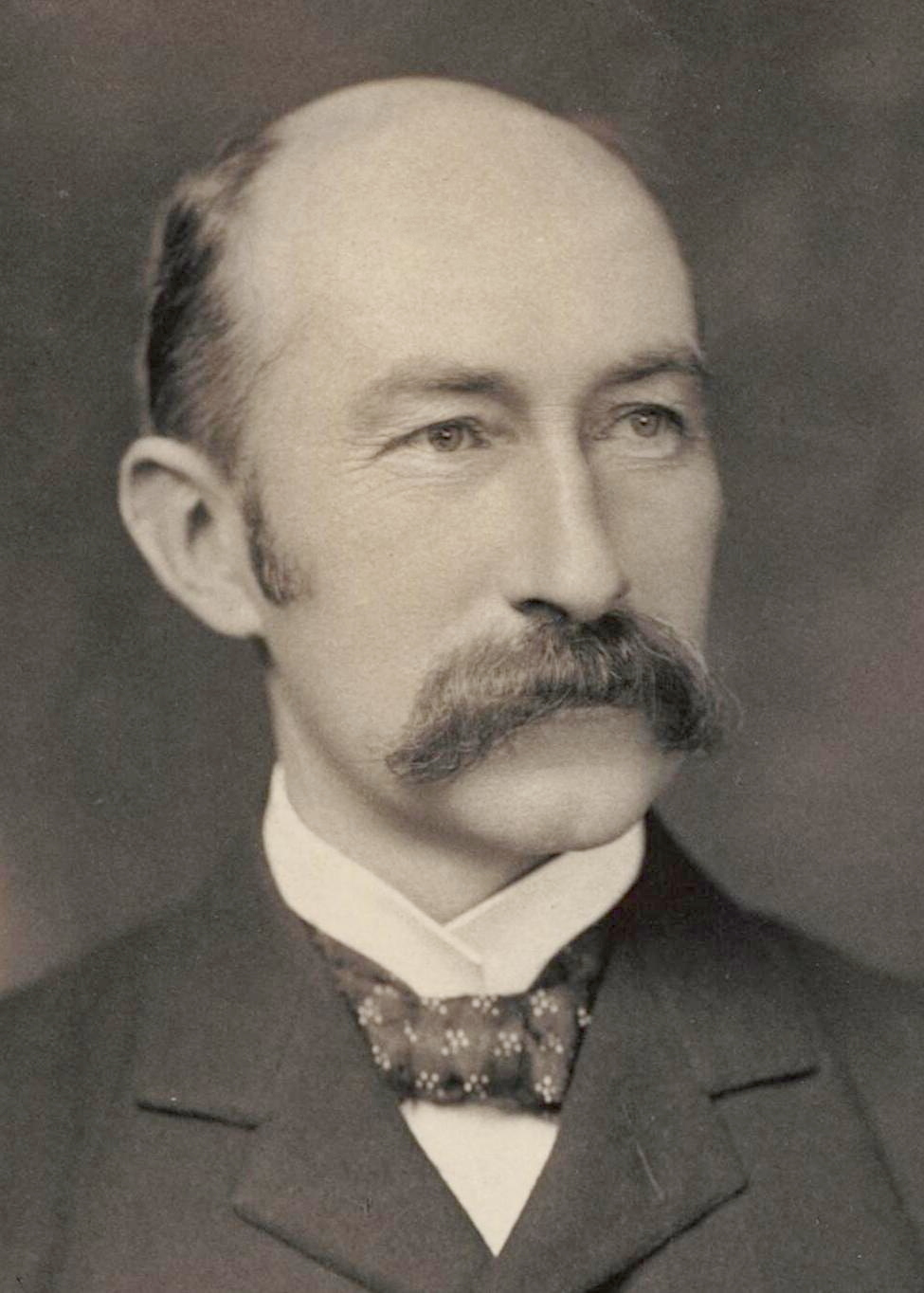
H. B. Higgins, the division's namesake

The division was created in 1949. Like other seats in inner-eastern Melbourne, Higgins had historically been a stronghold for the Liberal Party. It was considered a "leadership seat", in part because the seat's first two members, Harold Holt and Sir John Gorton, were Prime Ministers of Australia in the period between 1966 and 1971.

More recently, the seat was held by Peter Costello, a prominent member of the Howard government as the longest serving Treasurer of Australia and Deputy Leader of the Liberal Party. Costello resigned from the seat on 19 October 2009, and was succeeded in the ensuing by-election by fellow Liberal Kelly O'Dwyer, who would go on to become a minister in the Abbott and Turnbull governments.

O'Dwyer retired in 2019. At that election, Labor came reasonably close to winning this seat for the first time ever, with Labor's highest two-party preferred vote in the history of the seat (46.12%). Liberal candidate Katie Allen, however, saw off a challenge from barrister Fiona McLeod, despite suffering a swing of six percent, making Higgins marginal against Labor for the first time ever. Allen became the first Liberal candidate to come up short of an outright majority on the first count. High-profile Greens candidate Jason Ball also contested the seat, receiving almost a quarter of the vote.

At the 2022 election, Labor took the seat for the first time. While Allen led Labor challenger Michelle Ananda-Rajah for most of the night, on the seventh count the Green candidate's preferences flowed overwhelmingly to Ananda-Rajah, allowing Ananda-Rajah to win on a swing of 4.7 percent.

Higgins is the only Division to have been held by two Prime Ministers. This occurred when Holt went missing while Prime Minister, and then-Senator Gorton used the ensuing by-election to transfer to the House. Prior to 2022, it had only been out of Liberal hands for eight months in its existence, when Gorton became an independent to protest against Malcolm Fraser's becoming Liberal leader.

The seat is one of the few to have produced two federal Treasurers; Holt and Costello served as Treasurers during their respective tenure in Higgins. Another member, Kelly O'Dwyer had a stint as Assistant Treasurer.

== Name ==
The division is named after Justice H. B. Higgins (1851–1929), who was a Member of the Victorian Legislative Assembly (1894) and president of the Carlton Football Club (1904). He was a founding Member of Australian House of Representatives, serving as the Protectionist member for Northern Melbourne and was the Attorney-General in the Watson government (1904). He went on to become a Justice of the High Court of Australia (1906–1929)

== Members ==
Image	Member	Party	Term	Notes
	Harold Holt (1908–1967)	Liberal	10 December 1949 – 17 December 1967	Previously held the Division of Fawkner. Served as minister under Menzies. Served as Prime Minister from 1966 to 1967. Died in office
	John Gorton (1911–2002)	Liberal	24 February 1968 – 23 May 1975	Previously a member of the Senate. Served as Prime Minister from 1968 to 1971. Served as minister under McMahon. Did not contest in 1975. Failed to win a Senate seat
	John Gorton (1911–2002)	Independent	23 May 1975 – 11 November 1975	Previously a member of the Senate. Served as Prime Minister from 1968 to 1971. Served as minister under McMahon. Did not contest in 1975. Failed to win a Senate seat
	Roger Shipton (1936–1998)	Liberal	13 December 1975 – 19 February 1990	Lost preselection and retired
	Peter Costello (1957–)	Liberal	24 March 1990 – 19 October 2009	Served as minister under Howard. Resigned to retire from politics
	Kelly O'Dwyer (1977–)	Liberal	5 December 2009 – 11 April 2019	Served as minister under Turnbull and Morrison. Retired
	Katie Allen (1966–2025)	Liberal	18 May 2019 – 21 May 2022	Lost seat
	Michelle Ananda-Rajah (1972–)	Labor	21 May 2022 – 3 May 2025	Transferred to the Senate after Higgins was abolished in 2025

== Election results ==
2022 Australian federal election: Higgins
Party	Candidate	Votes	%	±%
Liberal	Katie Allen	38,859	40.69	−5.84
Labor	Michelle Ananda-Rajah	27,187	28.46	+2.39
Greens	Sonya Semmens	21,632	22.65	−0.06
Liberal Democrats	Matthew Ford	2,648	2.77	+2.77
United Australia	Ingram Spencer	1,917	2.01	+0.84
Reason	Andrew Johnson	1,458	1.53	+1.53
Animal Justice	Alicia Walker	1,295	1.36	−0.40
Federation	Suzie Menoudakis	515	0.54	+0.54
Total formal votes		95,511	97.18	−0.31
Informal votes		2,774	2.82	+0.31
Turnout		98,285	91.23	−2.45
Two-party-preferred result
Labor	Michelle Ananda-Rajah	49,726	52.06	+4.67
Liberal	Katie Allen	45,785	47.94	−4.67
Labor gain from Liberal		Swing	+4.67	

Alluvial diagram for preference flows in the seat of Higgins in the 2022 federal election. indicates at what stage the winning candidate had over 50% of the votes and was declared the winner.

Primary vote results in Higgins (Parties that did not get 5% of the vote are omitted)
Liberal
Labor
Australian Democrats
Greens
View source data.
Two-party-preferred vote results in Higgins View source data.
