= 2022 Australian Senate election =

Australian federal election results

2022 Australian federal election (Senate)
- 21 May 2022

40 of the 76 seats in the Australian Senate 39 seats needed for a majority
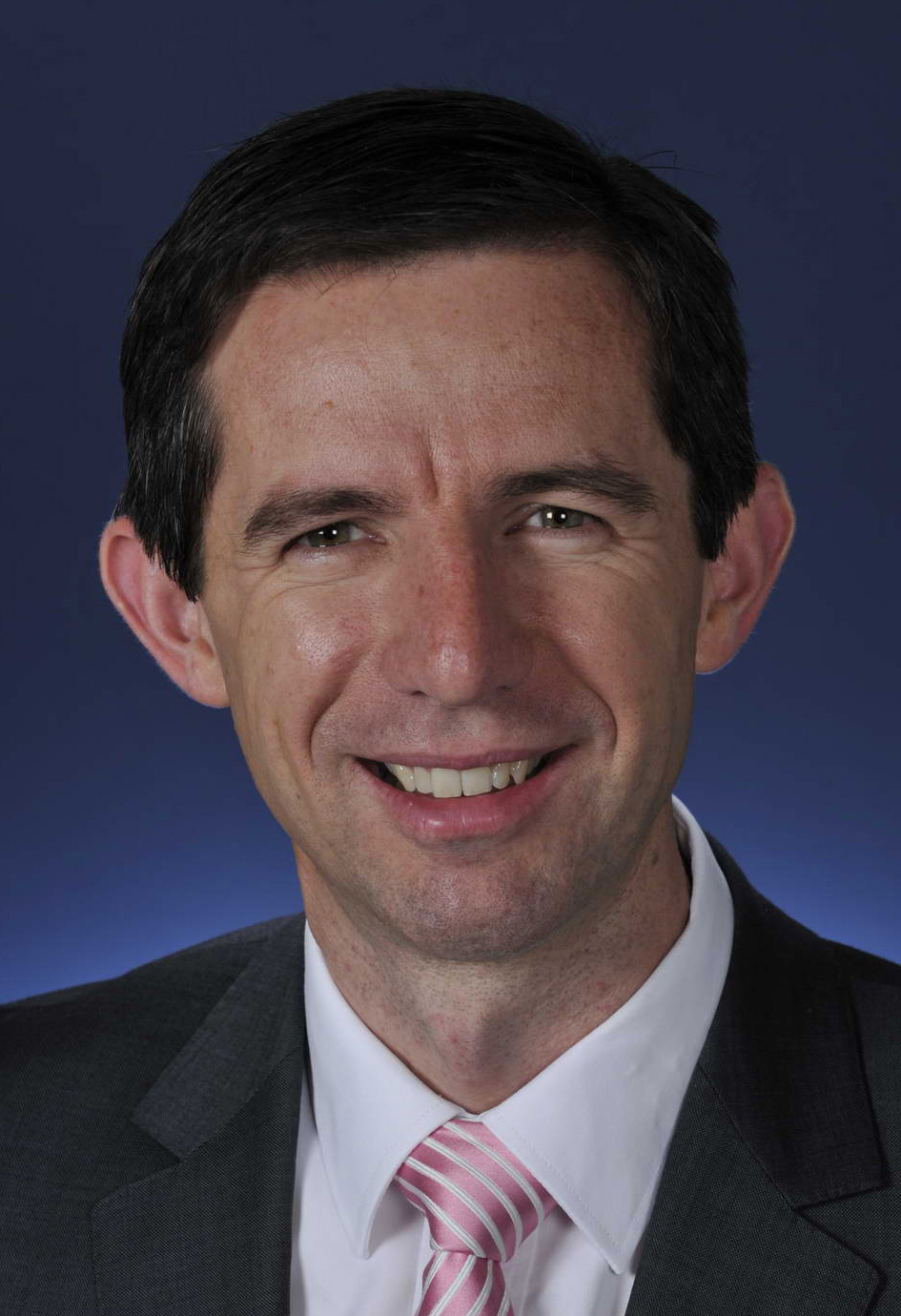

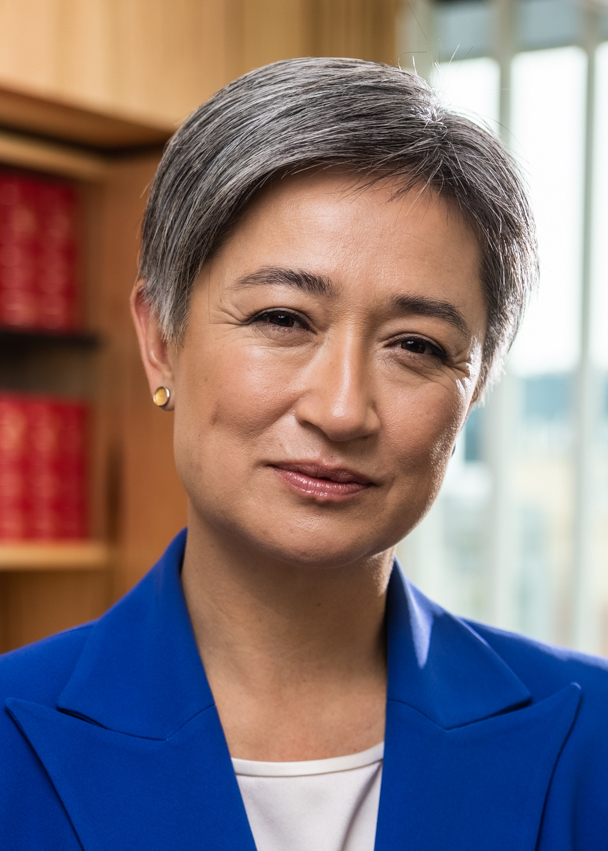

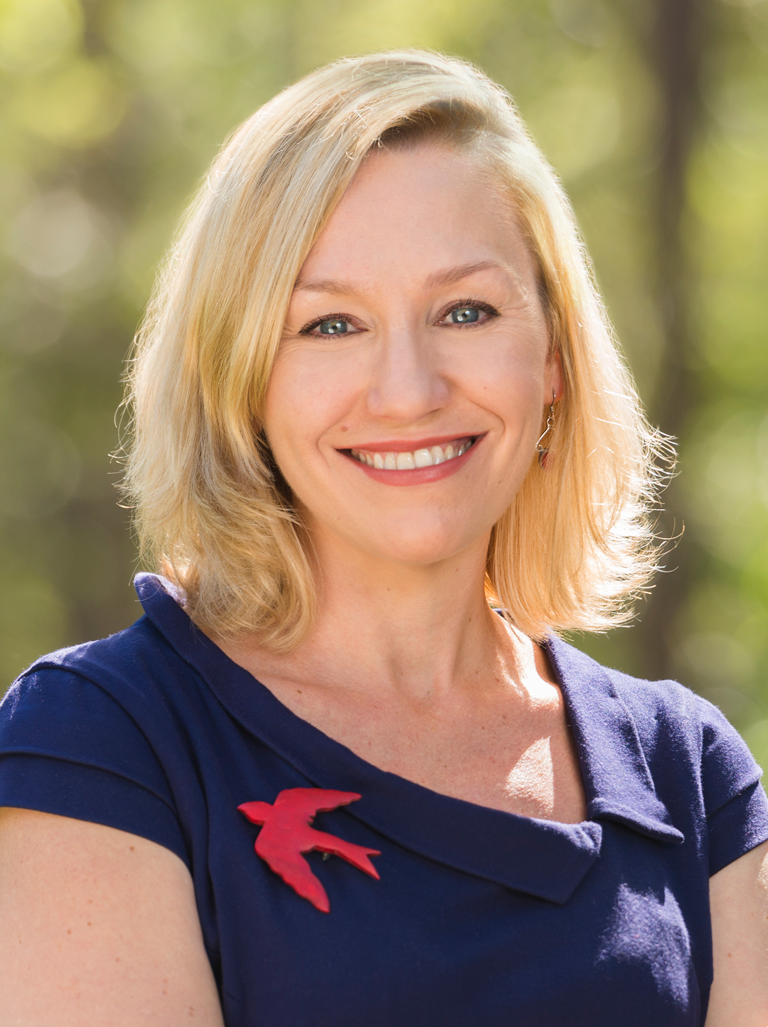

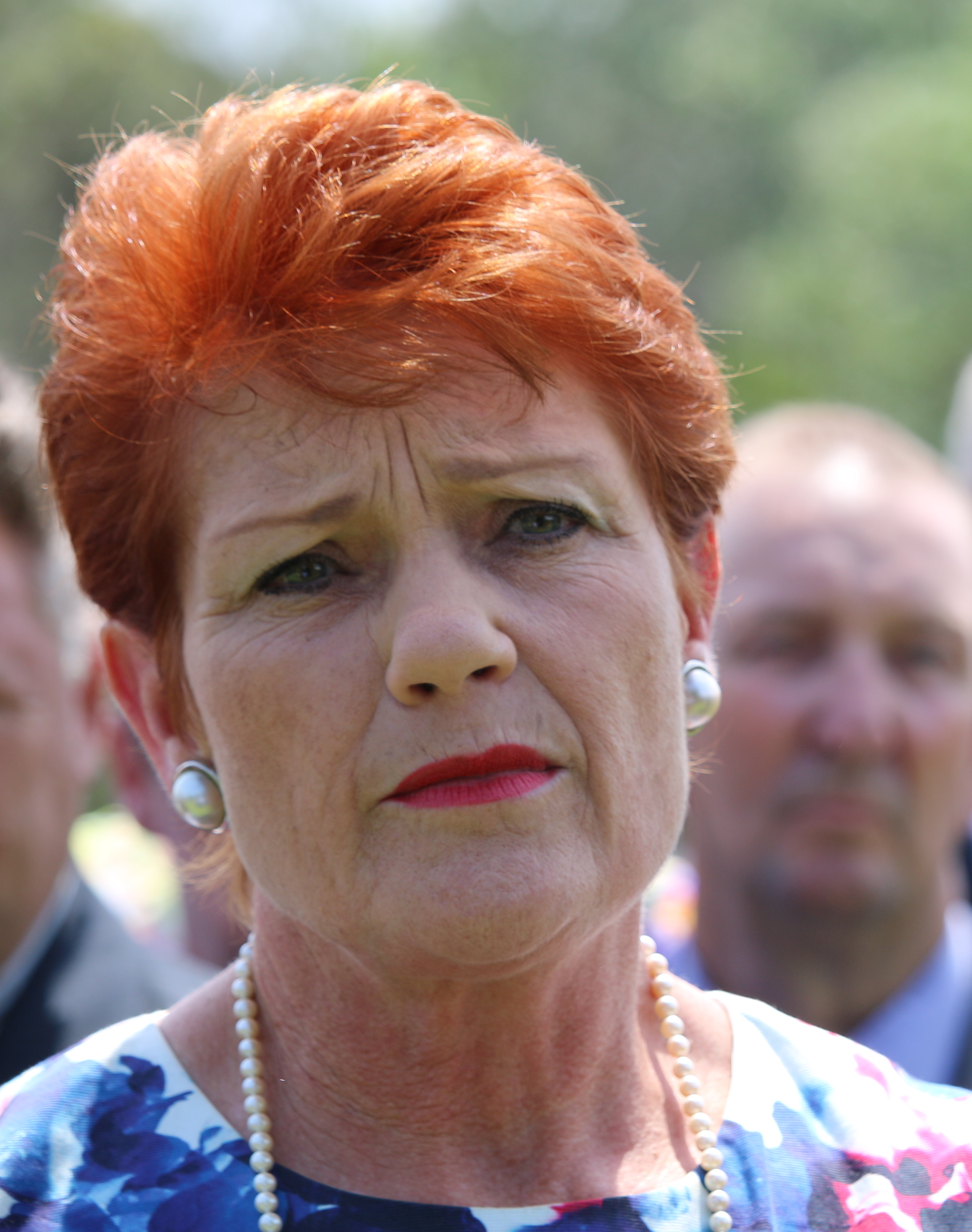

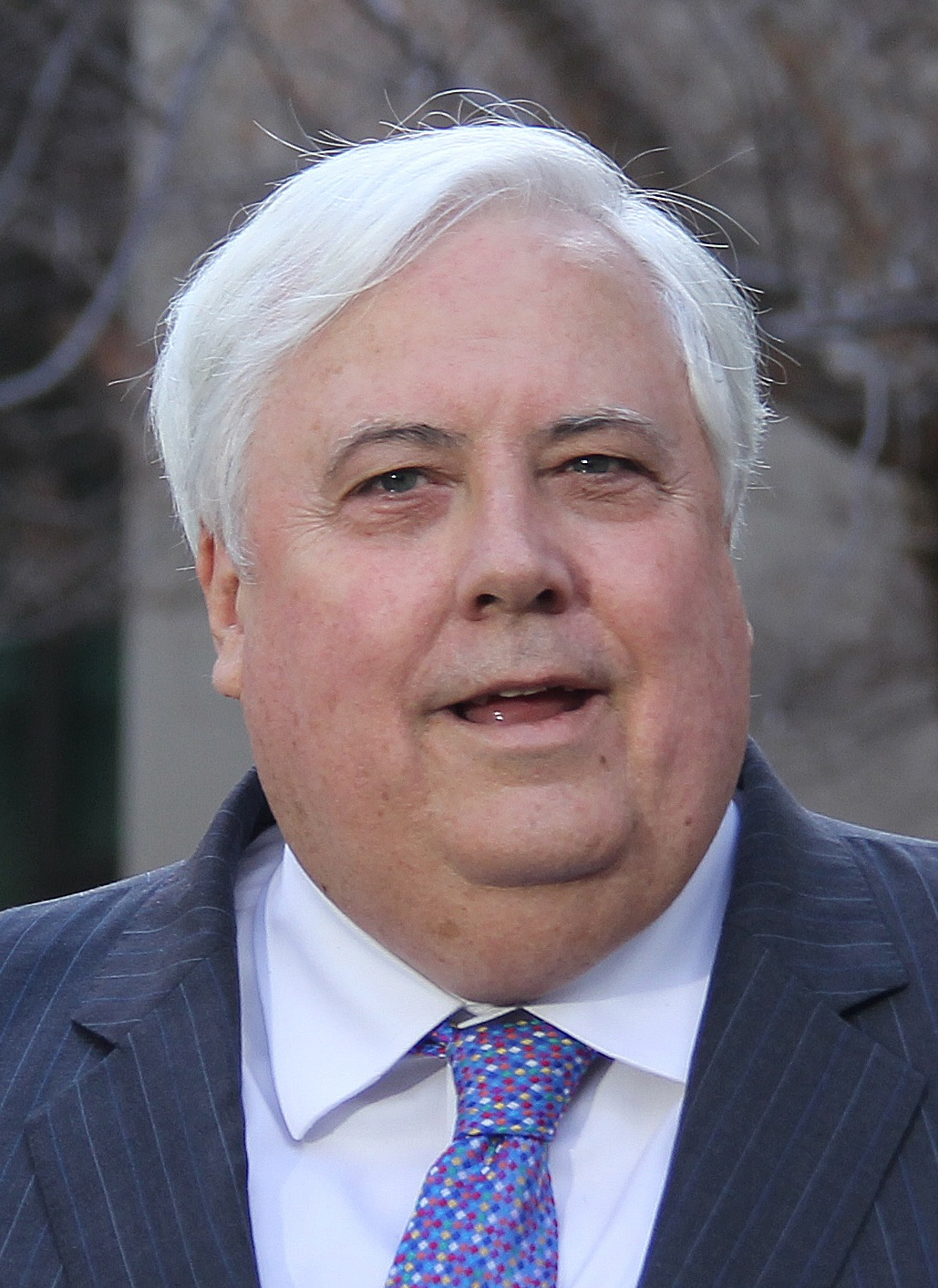

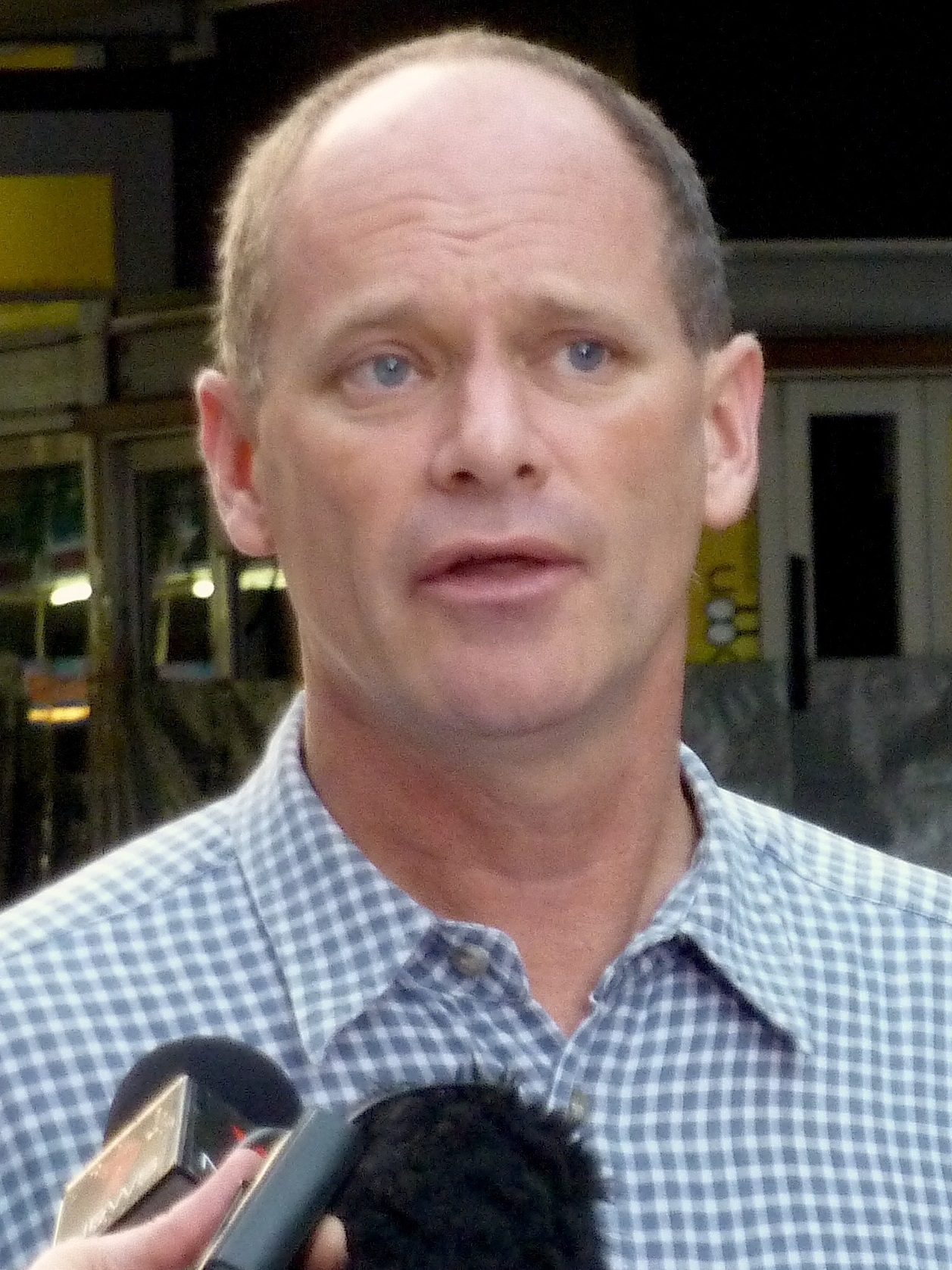

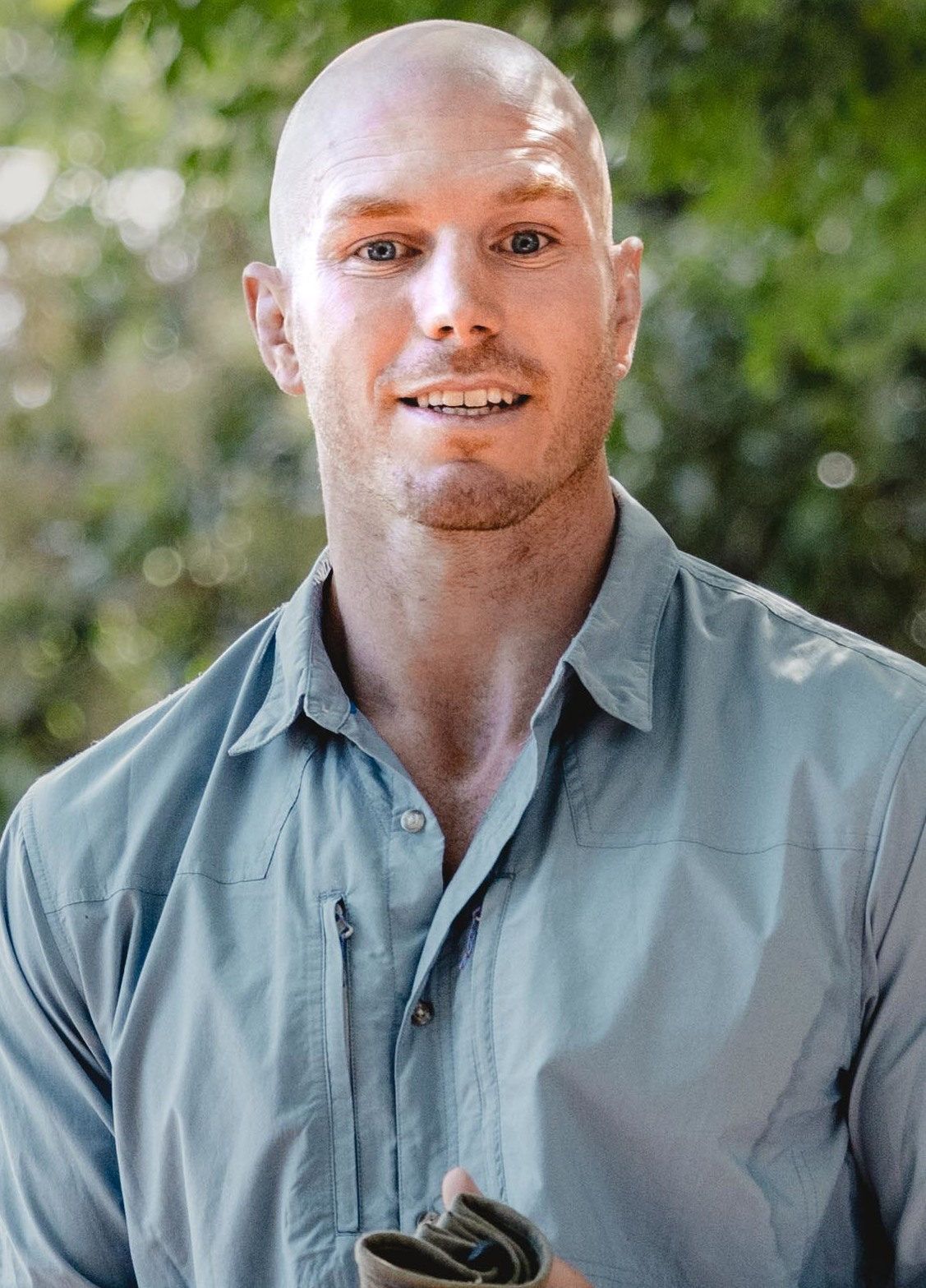

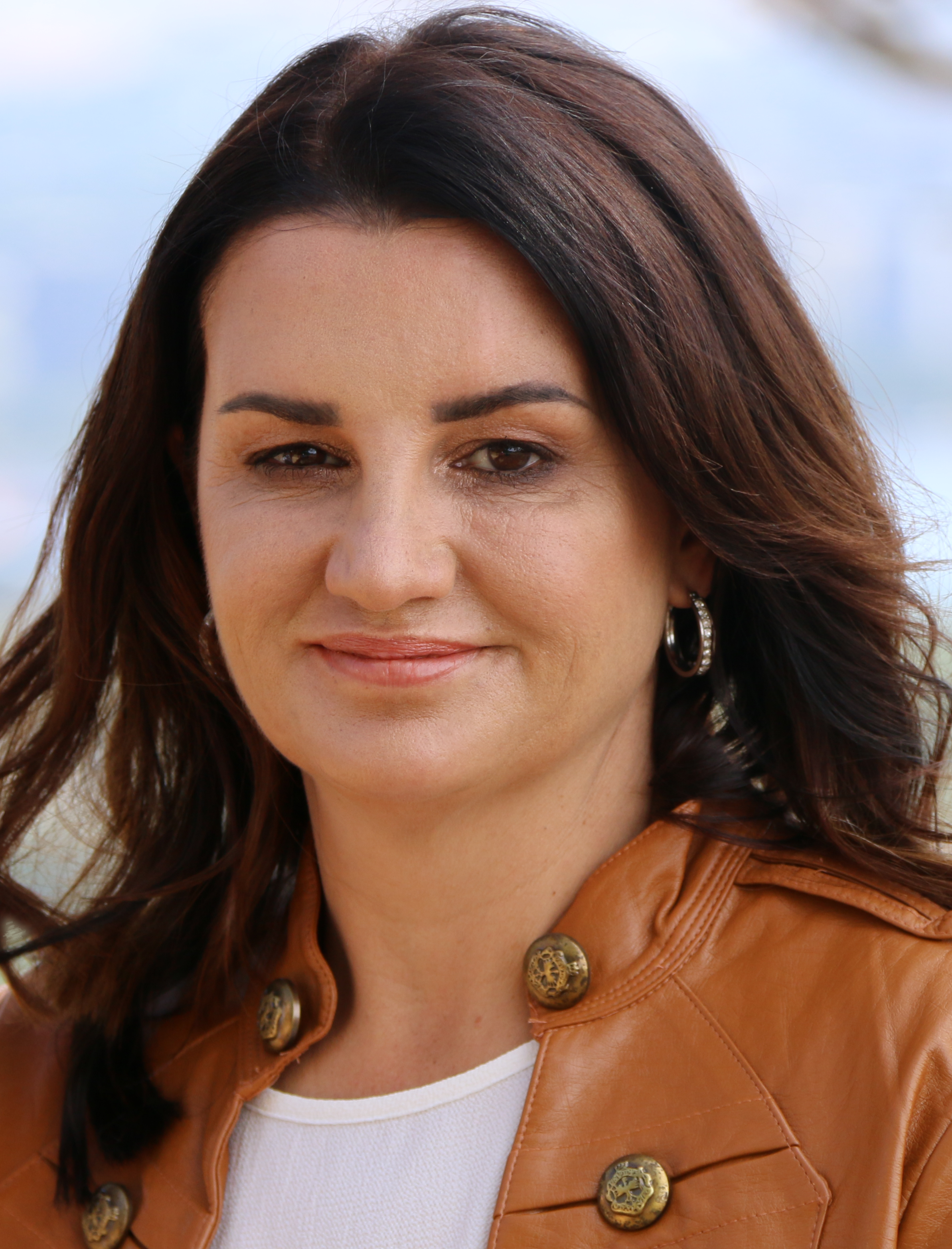

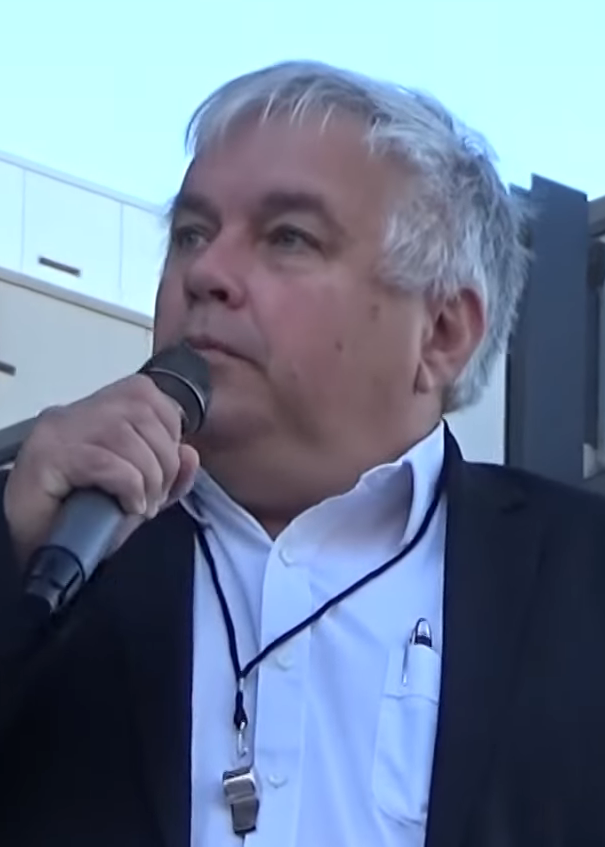
	First party	Second party	Third party
Leader	Simon Birmingham	Penny Wong	Larissa Waters
Party	Liberal/National coalition	Labor	Greens
Leader since	30 October 2020	26 June 2013	4 February 2020
Leader's seat	South Australia	South Australia	Queensland
Seats before	36	26	9
Seats won	15	15	6
Seats after	32	26	12
Seat change	▼4	Steady	▲3
Primary vote	5,148,028	4,525,598	1,903,403
Percentage	34.24%	30.09%	12.66%
Swing	▼3.75 pp	▲1.30 pp	▲2.47 pp
	Fourth party	Fifth party	Sixth party
Leader	Pauline Hanson	Clive Palmer	Campbell Newman
Party	One Nation	United Australia	Liberal Democrats
Leader since	29 November 2014	25 April 2013	8 August 2021
Leader's seat	Queensland	None (contested Queensland)	None (contested Queensland)
Seats before	2	0	1
Seats won	1	1	0
Seats after	2	1	0
Seat change	Steady	▲1	▼1
Primary vote	644,744	520,520	340,132
Percentage	4.29%	3.46%	2.26%
Swing	▼1.11 pp	▲1.10 pp	▲1.10 pp
	Seventh party	Eighth party	Ninth party
Leader	David Pocock	Jacqui Lambie	Rex Patrick
Party	David Pocock	Lambie Network	Rex Patrick Team
Leader since	16 December 2021	14 May 2015	26 October 2020
Leader's seat	Australian Capital Territory (won seat)	Tasmania (not up for election)	South Australia (lost seat)
Seats before	0	1	1
Seats won	1	1	0
Seats after	1	2	0
Seat change	▲1	▲1	▼1
Primary vote	60,406	31,023	23,425
Percentage	0.40%	0.21%	0.16%
Swing	▲0.40 pp	Steady	▲0.16 pp
Senate Leader before election
Simon Birmingham
Coalition
Subsequent Senate Leader
Penny Wong
Labor

The 2022 Australian Senate election was held on 21 May 2022 to elect 40 of the 76 senators in the Australian Senate as part of the 2022 federal election. Senators elected at this election took office on 1 July 2022, with the exception of the senators elected from two territories whose terms commenced from election day. The elected senators sit alongside continuing senators elected in 2019 as part of the 47th Parliament of Australia.

The Coalition remained the largest parliamentary grouping in the Senate, despite their defeat in the House of Representatives. The Greens won three additional seats in the Senate, thereby gaining the balance of power in the upper house; two senators from every state were Greens as a result of this election. Meanwhile, the incoming Labor government's numbers in the Senate remained unchanged. The six other crossbench seats were 2 One Nation, 2 Jacqui Lambie Network, 1 United Australia Party, and 1 independent (David Pocock).

== Australia ==
Senate (STV) – Turnout 90.47% (CV)
Party	First-preference votes	%	±	Seats			
Party	First-preference votes	%	±	Seats won	Not up	New total	Seat change
Liberal/National Coalition	5,148,028	34.24	–3.75	15	17	32	▼4
Liberal/National joint ticket	2,997,004	19.93	–1.66	5	6	11	▼1
Liberal National (Qld)	1,061,638	7.06	–0.67	2	3	5	▼1
Liberal	1,052,571	7.00	–1.24	7	8	15	▼2
Country Liberal (NT)	32,846	0.22	–0.04	1	0	1	Steady
National	3,969	0.03	–0.14	0	0	0	Steady
Labor	4,525,598	30.09	+1.30	15	11	26	Steady
Greens	1,903,403	12.66	+2.47	6	6	12	▲3
One Nation	644,744	4.29	–1.11	1	1	2	Steady
United Australia	520,520	3.46	+1.10	1	0	1	▲1
Legalise Cannabis	501,421	3.33	+1.53	0	0	0	Steady
Liberal Democrats	340,132	2.26	+1.10	0	0	0	Steady
Animal Justice	240,696	1.60	+0.34	0	0	0	Steady
Shooters, Fishers and Farmers	147,737	0.98	–0.75	0	0	0	Steady
Great Australian	82,237	0.55	+0.32	0	0	0	Steady
Sustainable Australia	78,181	0.52	+0.11	0	0	0	Steady
Reason	74,223	0.49	+0.49	0	0	0	Steady
Indigenous-Aboriginal	71,811	0.48	+0.48	0	0	0	Steady
Australian Democrats	65,532	0.44	+0.27	0	0	0	Steady
David Pocock	60,406	0.40	+0.40	1	0	1	▲1
Justice	54,366	0.36	–0.36	0	0	0	Steady
Fusion	51,676	0.34	+0.34	0	0	0	Steady
Informed Medical Options	48,830	0.32	+0.20	0	0	0	Steady
Australian Values	41,351	0.27	+0.27	0	0	0	Steady
Federation	33,551	0.22	+0.22	0	0	0	Steady
Christians	33,143	0.22	+0.06	0	0	0	Steady
Lambie Network	31,203	0.21	+0.00	1	1	2	▲1
Citizens	29,799	0.20	+0.13	0	0	0	Steady
Socialist Alliance	28,057	0.19	+0.14	0	0	0	Steady
Western Australia	26,555	0.18	+0.06	0	0	0	Steady
Patrick Team	23,425	0.16	+0.16	0	0	0	▼1 (Note: Rex Patrick was appointed to the Senate in 2017 as a member of the Nick Xenophon Team, which became Centre Alliance however the party did not contest this election. The other Centre Alliance senator, Stirling Griff, ran with Nick Xenophon in Group O.)
Victorian Socialists	21,739	0.14	+0.14	0	0	0	Steady
Federal ICAC Now	18,508	0.12	+0.12	0	0	0	Steady
TNL	13,217	0.09	+0.09	0	0	0	Steady
Seniors United	12,790	0.09	+0.04	0	0	0	Steady
Kim for Canberra	12,622	0.08	+0.08	0	0	0	Steady
Local	7,605	0.05	+0.05	0	0	0	Steady
Progressives	5,932	0.04	+0.04	0	0	0	Steady
Democratic Alliance	5,566	0.04	+0.04	0	0	0	Steady
Unendorsed/ungrouped	136,054	0.90	+0.40	0	0	0	▼1 (Note: Stirling Griff was elected to the Senate in 2016 as a member of the Nick Xenophon Team, which became Centre Alliance however the party did not contest this election, with Stirling Griff running with Nick Xenophon in Group O. The other Centre Alliance senator, Rex Patrick, ran with the eponymous Patrick Team.)
Total	15,040,658	100.00	–	40	36	76	–
Invalid/blank votes	532,003	3.42	−0.39	–	–	–	–
Turnout	15,572,661	90.47	–2.01	–	–	–	–
Registered Voters	17,213,433	–	–	–	–	–	–
Source: AEC for votes, ABC for seats

== New South Wales ==
2022 Australian federal election: Senate, New South Wales
Party	Candidate	Votes	%	±%
Quota		685,818		
Liberal/National Coalition	1. Marise Payne (elected 1); 2. Ross Cadell (elected 3); 3. Jim Molan (elected 6); 4. Alison Penfold; 5. Mary-Lou Jarvis; 6. Vicky McGahey	1,763,074	36.73	–1.82
Labor	1. Deborah O'Neill (elected 2); 2. Jenny McAllister (elected 4); 3. Shireen Morris; 4. Mich-Elle Myers; 5. Kylie Rose; 6. James Warren-Smith	1,461,172	30.44	+0.62
Greens	1. David Shoebridge (elected 5); 2. Amanda Cohn; 3. Rochelle Flood; 4. Jane Scott; 5. Hawa Arya; 6. Danielle Wheeler	550,069	11.56	+2.73
One Nation	1. Kate McCulloch; 2. Colin Grigg; 3. Roger Smith	198,121	4.13	–0.83
United Australia	1. Dominic Martino; 2. Suellen Wrightson; 3. Wayne Moore; 4. Michelle Martin; 5. Johnny Yap; 6. Kevin Loughrey	162,262	3.38	+1.89
Legalise Cannabis	1. Michael Balderstone; 2. Gail Hester	125,001	2.60	+0.48
Animal Justice	1. Darren Brollo; 2. Julie Power	103,239	2.15	+1.11
Liberal Democrats	1. John Ruddick; 2. John Larter; 3. James Caldwell; 4. Mark Guest	101,780	2.12	+0.21
Shooters, Fishers, Farmers	1. Shane Djuric; 2. Desiree Gregory; 3. Brian Millgate; 4. Jeremy Crooks	91,143	1.90	–0.64
Indigenous-Aboriginal	1. Owen Whyman; 2. Lawrence Brooke	38,970	0.81	+0.81
Reason	1. Jane Caro; 2. Hannah Maher; 3. Diana Ryall	30,307	0.63	+0.63
Sustainable Australia	1. Georgia Lamb; 2. Suzanne De Vive	25,356	0.53	+0.10
Informed Medical Options	1. Michael O'Neill; 2. Marelle Burnum Burnum	18,409	0.38	+0.27
Fusion	1. Andrea Leong; 2. Ian Bryce	17,565	0.37	+0.37
Democrats	1. Steven Baty; 2. Suzanne Rogers; 3. Craig Richards	17,542	0.37	+0.18
Great Australian	1. Matthew Hopkins; 2. George Nohra	16,886	0.35	+0.18
Citizens	1. Kingsley Liu; 2. Ann Lawler	14,419	0.30	+0.27
Seniors United	1. Dessie Kocher; 2. Ray Bennie	12,790	0.27	+0.12
Federal ICAC Now	1. Ross Jones; 2. Gabrielle Anderson	10,769	0.22	+0.22
Australian Values	1. Selena Clancy; 2. Dave Gilbert	9,043	0.19	+0.19
TNL	1. Steve Keen; 2. Melissa Green	8,915	0.19	+0.19
Socialist Equality	1. Max Boddy; 2. Oscar Grenfell	8,587	0.18	+0.18
Socialist Alliance	1. Paula Sanchez; 2. Niko Leka; 3. Rachel Evans	8,184	0.17	+0.04
Ungrouped	Danny Lim; Julie Collins; Warren Grzic; Guitang Lu; William Lang	7,119	0.15	+0.37
Total formal votes		4,800,722	96.09	–0.37
Informal votes		195,388	3.91	+0.37
Turnout		4,996,110	91.37	–1.28
Party total seats			Seats	±
Liberal			4	▼1
National			2	▲1
Labor			4	▼1
Greens			2	▲1

#	Senator	Party
1	Marise Payne	Liberal
2	Deborah O'Neill	Labor
3	Ross Cadell	National
4	Jenny McAllister	Labor
5	David Shoebridge	Greens
6	Jim Molan	Liberal

== Victoria ==
2022 Australian federal election: Senate, Victoria
Party	Candidate	Votes	%	±%
Quota		545,935		
Liberal/National Coalition	1. Sarah Henderson (elected 1); 2. Bridget McKenzie (elected 3); 3. Greg Mirabella; 4. Chrestyna Kmetj; 5. Mick Harrington; 6. David Burgess	1,233,930	32.29	–3.61
Labor	1. Linda White (elected 2); 2. Jana Stewart (elected 4); 3. Casey Nunn; 4. Megan Bridger-Darling; 5. Josh McFarlane	1,201,830	31.45	+0.33
Greens	1. Lidia Thorpe (elected 5); 2. Adam Frogley; 3. Sissy Austin; 4. Zeb Payne	529,429	13.85	+3.23
United Australia	1. Ralph Babet (elected 6); 2. Kelly Moran; 3. Kenneth Grimmond	153,231	4.01	+1.53
Legalise Cannabis	1. Elissa Smith; 2. Wayne Taylor	114,805	3.00	+1.50
One Nation	1. Warren Pickering; 2. Stuart Huxham	111,176	2.91	+0.06
Liberal Democrats	1. David Limbrick; 2. Krystle Mitchell; 3. Caroline White	92,295	2.42	+1.46
Animal Justice	1. Bronwyn Currie; 2. Chris Delforce	57,836	1.51	–0.02
Justice	1. Derryn Hinch; 2. Ruth Stanfield	54,366	1.42	–1.40
Shooters, Fishers, Farmers	1. Ethan Constantinou; 2. Nicole Bourman	49,750	1.30	–0.55
Reason	1. Yolanda Vega; 2. Harry Millward	37,402	0.98	+0.98
Democrats	1. Leonie Green; 2. Stephen Jagoe	28,693	0.75	+0.49
Victorian Socialists	1. Aran Mylvaganam; 2. Laura Riccardi	21,739	0.57	+0.57
Sustainable Australia	1. Madeleine Wearne; 2. Robert Long	17,594	0.46	+0.08
Group R	1. Morgan Jonas; 2. Monica Smit	15,057	0.39	+0.39
Fusion	1. Kammy Cordner-Hunt; 2. Tahlia Farrant	13,920	0.36	+0.36
Great Australian	1. Darryl O'Bryan; 2. Geoff Whitehead	13,648	0.36	+0.22
Federation	1. Vern Hughes; 2. Karen Kim; 3. Cheryl Lacey; 4. Chris Mara; 5. Neerja Sewak; 6. Mark O'Connell	12,357	0.32	+0.32
Group B	1. Damien Richardson; 2. John McBride	12,161	0.32	+0.32
Australian Values	1. Chris Burson; 2. Samantha Asser	11,809	0.31	+0.31
Informed Medical Options	1. Nick Clonaridis; 2. Robyn Curnow	8,134	0.21	+0.21
Socialist Alliance	1. Felix Dance; 2. Angela Carr	6,841	0.18	+0.18
Progressives	1. Antoinette Pitt; 2. David Knight	5,307	0.14	+0.14
Citizens	1. Robbie Barwick; 2. Craig Isherwood	5,206	0.14	+0.05
Group T	1. Susan Benedyka; 2. Christine Richards	3,768	0.10	+0.10
Socialist Equality	1. Peter Byrne; 2. Jason Wardle	1,003	0.03	+0.03
Ungrouped	Glenn Floyd (Liberty); Allen Ridgeway; James Bond; Neal Smith; Max Dicks; Bernardine Atkinson; Paul Ross; Nat de Francesco; Joseph Toscano; Tara Tran; David Dillon; Geraldine Gonslavez	8,252	0.22	+0.15
Total formal votes		3,821,539	96.48	+0.50
Informal votes		139,419	3.52	−0.50
Turnout		3,960,958	91.27	–1.85
Party total seats			Seats	±
Liberal			4	▼1
National			1	Steady
Labor			4	Steady
Greens			2	Steady
United Australia			1	▲1

#	Senator	Party
1	Sarah Henderson	Liberal
2	Linda White	Labor
3	Bridget McKenzie	National
4	Jana Stewart	Labor
5	Lidia Thorpe	Greens
6	Ralph Babet	UAP

== Queensland ==
2022 Australian federal election: Senate, Queensland
Party	Candidate	Votes	%	±%
Quota		430,553		
Liberal National	1. James McGrath (elected 1); 2. Matt Canavan (elected 3); 3. Amanda Stoker; 4. Nicole Tobin; 5. Andrew Cripps; 6. Fiona Ward	1,061,638	35.23	–3.67
Labor	1. Murray Watt (elected 2); 2. Anthony Chisholm (elected 6); 3. Edwina Andrew; 4. Christina Warry; 5. Jen Henderson; 6. Richard Pascoe	744,212	24.69	+2.12
Greens	1. Penny Allman-Payne (elected 4); 2. Anna Sri; 3. Ben Pennings; 4. Navdeep Singh Sidhu; 5. Alyce Nelligan; 6. Rebecca Haley	373,460	12.39	+2.45
One Nation	1. Pauline Hanson (elected 5); 2. Raj Guruswamy; 3. George Christensen	222,925	7.40	–2.87
Legalise Cannabis	1. Bernard Bradley; 2. Suzette Luyken	161,899	5.37	+3.62
United Australia	1. Clive Palmer; 2. Martin Brewster; 3. Desmond Adidi; 4. Jack McCabe	126,343	4.19	+0.67
Liberal Democrats	1. Campbell Newman; 2. Tegan Grainger	75,158	2.49	+1.66
Animal Justice	1. Mackenzie Severns; 2. Sue Weber	38,765	1.29	–0.04
Indigenous-Aboriginal	1. Lionel Henaway; 2. Jenny-Lee Carr	32,841	1.09	+1.09
Great Australian	1. Jason Miles; 2. Elise Cottam	24,262	0.81	+0.63
Sustainable Australia	1. Rhett Martin; 2. Timotheos Firestone	19,146	0.64	+0.35
Australian Values	1. Heston Russell; 2. Jay Hansen	18,194	0.60	+0.60
Informed Medical Options	1. Allona Lahn; 2. Jasmine Melhop; 3. Peter Lambeth	13,916	0.46	+0.18
The Silent Majority	1. Len Harris; 2. Debra Yuill	13,205	0.44	+0.44
Democrats	1. Luke Arbuckle; 2. Chris Simpson	11,473	0.38	+0.38
Fusion	1. Brandon Selic; 2. Roger Whatling	11,079	0.37	+0.37
Socialist Alliance	1. Renee Lees; 2. Kamala Emanuel	10,538	0.34	+0.34
Federation	1. Isabel Tilyard; 2. Jackie Bennett; 3. Michael Smyth	7,330	0.24	+0.24
Reason	1. Ron Williams; 2. Frank Jordan	6,514	0.22	+0.22
Federal ICAC Now	1. Kerin Payne; 2. Ken Carroll	6,199	0.21	+0.21
Citizens	1. Jan Pukallus; 2. Rod Doel	6,123	0.20	+0.13
Democratic Alliance	1. Drew Pavlou; 2. Simon Leitch	4,555	0.15	+0.15
Group H	1. Steve Dickson; 2. Rebecca Lloyd	4,566	0.15	+0.15
TNL	1. Bess Brennan; 2. Hannah Kennish; 3. Steven Hopley; 4. Jonathon Momsen; 5. Lloyd Ingram; 6. Jack Creighton	4,302	0.14	+0.14
Socialist Equality	1. Mike Head; 2. John Davis	1,129	0.04	+0.04
Ungrouped	Robert Lyon (KAP); David Schfe; Lindsay Temple; Chey Hamilton; Lorraine Smith; Laurence Quinlivan; Karakan Kochardy; Peter Rogers	14,096	0.47	+0.31
Total formal votes		3,013,868	96.88	+0.14
Informal votes		97,166	3.12	−0.14
Turnout		3,111,034	88.85	–3.07
Party total seats			Seats	±
Liberal National			5	▼1
Labor			3	Steady
Greens			2	▲1
One Nation			2	Steady

#	Senator	Party
1	James McGrath	Liberal National
2	Murray Watt	Labor
3	Matt Canavan	Liberal National
4	Penny Allman-Payne	Greens
5	Pauline Hanson	One Nation
6	Anthony Chisholm	Labor

== Western Australia ==
2022 Australian federal election: Senate, Western Australia
Party	Candidate	Votes	%	±%
Quota		218,018		
Labor	1. Sue Lines (elected 1); 2. Glenn Sterle (elected 3); 3. Fatima Payman (elected 6); 4. Vicki Helps	527,319	34.55	+6.92
Liberal	1. Michaelia Cash (elected 2); 2. Dean Smith (elected 4); 3. Ben Small; 4. Sherry Sufi	483,364	31.67	–9.24
Greens	1. Dorinda Cox (elected 5); 2. River Clarke; 3. Simone Collins; 4. Donald Clarke; 5. Jordan Cahill; 6. Alex Wallace	217,571	14.26	+2.45
One Nation	1. Paul Filing; 2. Sheila Mundy	53,260	3.49	–2.39
Legalise Cannabis	1. Nicola Johnson; 2. Aaron Peet	51,568	3.38	+1.69
Christians	1. Mike Crichton; 2. Maryka Groenewald	33,143	2.17	+0.51
United Australia	1. James McDonald; 2. Rob Forster	32,543	2.13	+0.38
Liberal Democrats	1. Kate Fantinel; 2. Peter McLoughlin	29,511	1.93	+1.21
Western Australia	1. Matthew McDowall; 2. Julie Matheson	26,555	1.74	+0.55
Great Australian	1. Rod Culleton; 2. Samantha Vinci	15,958	1.05	+0.83
Animal Justice	1. Amanda Dorn; 2. Elizabeth McCasker	14,186	0.93	–0.05
Federation	1. Judy Wilyman; 2. Leanne Barrett	8,339	0.55	+0.55
Sustainable Australia	1. Karen Oborn; 2. Ryan Oostryck	5,827	0.38	+0.03
Fusion	1. Tim Viljoen; 2. Adam Woodings	5,342	0.35	+0.35
Democrats	1. Elana Mitchell; 2. Simon Simson	4,630	0.30	+0.30
Informed Medical Options	1. Michelle Kinsella; 2. Leanne Lockyer	3,494	0.23	–0.03
Socialist Alliance	1. Petrina Harley; 2. Alex Salmon	2,494	0.16	+0.03
Australian Values	1. Rebecca Pizzey; 2. Kathy Fitzpatrick	2,305	0.15	+0.15
Social Justice Independents	1. Gerry Georgatos; 2. Megan Krakouer	2,254	0.15	+0.15
Citizens	1. Denise Bradley; 2. Jean Robinson	1,789	0.12	+0.04
Federal ICAC Now	1. Matthew Count; 2. Dianne Watkins	1,540	0.10	+0.10
No Mandatory Vaccination	1. Cam Tinley; 2. Tricia Ayre	993	0.07	+0.07
Ungrouped	Ziggi Murphy; Ashley Buckle; Peter McDonald; Yunous Vagh; Bob Burdett; Valentine Pegrum	2,138	0.14	+0.03
Total formal votes		1,526,123	97.09	+0.49
Informal votes		45,776	2.91	−0.49
Turnout		1,571,899	88.70	–2.27
Party total seats			Seats	±
Labor			5	▲1
Liberal			5	▼1
Greens			2	Steady

#	Senator	Party
1	Sue Lines	Labor
2	Michaelia Cash	Liberal
3	Glenn Sterle	Labor
4	Dean Smith	Liberal
5	Dorinda Cox	Greens
6	Fatima Payman	Labor

== South Australia ==
2022 Australian federal election: Senate, South Australia
Party	Candidate	Votes	%	±%
Quota		158,672		
Liberal	1. Simon Birmingham (elected 1); 2. Andrew McLachlan (elected 3); 3. Kerrynne Liddle (elected 6); 4. Tania Stock	382,874	33.93	–3.88
Labor	1. Penny Wong (elected 2); 2. Don Farrell (elected 4); 3. Trimann Gill; 4. Joanne Sutton; 5. Belinda Owens	364,104	32.26	+1.90
Greens	1. Barbara Pocock (elected 5); 2. Major Sumner; 3. Melanie Selwood	134,908	11.95	+1.04
One Nation	1. Jennifer Game; 2. Alan Watchman	45,249	4.01	–0.86
United Australia	1. Michael Arbon; 2. Caelum Schild	34,167	3.03	+0.00
Group O	1. Nick Xenophon; 2. Stirling Griff	33,713	2.99	+2.99
Legalise Cannabis	1. Tyler Green; 2. Angela Adams	26,235	2.32	+0.19
Liberal Democrats	1. Ian Markos; 2. Josh Smith	24,866	2.20	+1.53
Rex Patrick Team	1. Rex Patrick; 2. Leonie McMahon	23,425	2.08	+2.08
Animal Justice	1. Louise Pfeiffer; 2. Julie Pastro	19,843	1.76	–0.11
Great Australian	1. Jo-Anne Eason; 2. Trevor Bennett	6,910	0.61	–0.55
Federation	1. Cathy Byrne; 2. Nick Duffield	4,902	0.43	+0.43
Australian Family	1. Bob Day; 2. Pat Amadio	4,799	0.43	+0.43
National	1. Lisa Blandford; 2. Damien Buijs	3,969	0.35	+0.35
Fusion	1. Drew Wolfendale; 2. David Kennedy	3,770	0.33	+0.33
Sustainable Australia	1. Elise Michie; 2. Jack Duxbury	3,448	0.31	–0.17
Democrats	1. Roger Yazbek; 2. Sandra Kanck	3,194	0.28	–0.31
Local	1. Julie-Ann Finney; 2. Rodney Parnell	2,389	0.21	+0.21
Informed Medical Options	1. Raina Cruise; 2. Heather Harley	2,320	0.21	+0.21
Citizens	1. Russell Francis; 2. Rodney Currey	1,205	0.11	–0.04
Democratic Alliance	1. Adila Yarmuhammad; 2. Amina Yarmuhammad	1,011	0.09	+0.09
Group M	1. Harmeet Kaur; 2. Rajesh Kumar	571	0.05	+0.05
Ungrouped	Michael Hopper	652	0.06	−0.04
Total formal votes		1,128,524	97.08	+0.58
Informal votes		33,948	2.92	−0.58
Turnout		1,162,472	91.50	–2.20
Party total seats			Seats	±
Liberal			5	▲1
Labor			4	Steady
Greens			2	▲1
Centre Alliance			0	▼2

#	Senator	Party
1	Simon Birmingham	Liberal
2	Penny Wong	Labor
3	Andrew McLachlan	Liberal
4	Don Farrell	Labor
5	Barbara Pocock	Greens
6	Kerrynne Liddle	Liberal

== Tasmania ==
2022 Australian federal election: Senate, Tasmania
Party	Candidate	Votes	%	±%
Quota		51,579		
Liberal	1. Jonathon Duniam (elected 1); 2. Wendy Askew (elected 5); 3. Eric Abetz	115,594	32.02	+0.56
Labor	1. Anne Urquhart (elected 2); 2. Helen Polley (elected 4); 3. Kate Rainbird; 4. Daniel Hulme; 5. Wayne Roberts; 6. Chris Gourlay	97,614	27.04	–3.55
Greens	1. Peter Whish-Wilson (elected 3); 2. Vanessa Bleyer; 3. Tabatha Badger	55,899	15.48	+2.91
Lambie	1. Tammy Tyrrell (elected 6); 2. Sarah Groat; 3. Tom Lambie	31,203	8.64	–0.28
One Nation	1. Steve Mav; 2. Norelle Button	14,013	3.88	+0.43
Legalise Cannabis	1. Matt Owen; 2. Oliver Fitzgibbon	10,942	3.03	+1.85
Liberal Democrats	1. Topher Field; 2. Chris Croft	6,913	1.91	+1.23
Shooters, Fishers, Farmers	1. Ray Williams; 2. Carlo Di Falco; 3. Brenton Jones	6,844	1.90	+0.16
United Australia	1. Diana Adams; 2. Alan Hennessy	5,862	1.62	–1.02
Local	1. Leanne Minshull; 2. Linda Poulton; 3. Lara Van Raay	5,216	1.44	+1.44
Animal Justice	1. Ivan Davis; 2. Virginia Thomas-Wurth	4,938	1.37	+0.09
Sustainable Australia	1. Todd Dudley; 2. Daria Lockwood	3,457	0.96	+0.45
Informed Medical Options	1. Lynne Kershaw; 2. Matthew Pickering	1,099	0.30	+0.30
Federation	1. Ray Broomhall; 2. Justin Stringer	623	0.17	+0.17
Ungrouped	Steve Crothers; Fenella Edwards	831	0.23	–1.99
Total formal votes		361,048	96.80	+0.44
Informal votes		11,925	3.20	−0.44
Turnout		372,973	92.81	–1.87
Party total seats			Seats	±
Liberal			4	▼1
Labor			4	Steady
Greens			2	Steady
Lambie			2	▲1

#	Senator	Party
1	Jonathon Duniam	Liberal
2	Anne Urquhart	Labor
3	Peter Whish-Wilson	Greens
4	Helen Polley	Labor
5	Wendy Askew	Liberal
6	Tammy Tyrrell	Lambie

== Territories ==
=== Australian Capital Territory ===
#	Senator	Party
1	Katy Gallagher	Labor
2	David Pocock	David Pocock

2022 Australian federal election: Senate, Australian Capital Territory
Party	Candidate	Votes	%	±%
Quota		95,073		
Labor	1. Katy Gallagher (elected 1); 2. Maddy Northam	95,184	33.37	−5.98
Liberal	1. Zed Seselja; 2. Kacey Lam	70,739	24.80	−7.58
David Pocock	1. David Pocock (elected 2); 2. Clare Doube	60,406	21.18	+21.18
Greens	1. Tjanara Goreng Goreng; 2. James Cruz	29,360	10.29	−7.42
Kim for Canberra	1. Kim Rubenstein; 2. Kim Huynh	12,622	4.43	+4.43
United Australia	1. James Savoulidis; 2. Tracey Page	6,112	2.14	–0.13
Legalise Cannabis	1. Andrew Katelaris; 2. Michelle Stanvic	4,516	1.58	+1.58
Animal Justice	1. Yana Del Valle; 2. Jannah Fahiz	1,889	0.66	+0.66
Sustainable Australia	1. Joy Angel; 2. John Haydon	1,638	0.57	–1.08
Informed Medical Options	1. Michael Simms; 2. Mary-Jane Liddicoat	1,458	0.51	+0.51
Progressives	1. Therese Faulkner; 2. Stephen Lin	726	0.25	+0.25
Ungrouped	Fuxin Li	567	0.20	−5.54
Total formal votes		285,217	98.25	+0.57
Informal votes		5,091	1.75	–0.57
Turnout		290,308	92.45	−1.06
Party total seats			Seats	±
Labor			1	Steady
David Pocock			1	▲1
Liberal			0	▼1

=== Northern Territory ===
#	Senator	Party
1	Malarndirri McCarthy	Labor
2	Jacinta Nampijinpa Price	CLP

2022 Australian federal election: Senate, Northern Territory
Party	Candidate	Votes	%	±%
Quota		34,540		
Labor	1. Malarndirri McCarthy (elected 1); 2. Kate Ganley	34,163	32.97	–4.50
Country Liberal	1. Jacinta Nampijinpa Price (elected 2); 2. Kris Civitarese	32,846	31.70	−4.97
Greens	1. Jane Anzelark; 2. Dianne Stokes	12,707	12.26	+2.02
Liberal Democrats	1. Sam McMahon; 2. Jed Hansen	9,609	9.27	+9.27
Legalise Cannabis	1. Lance Lawrence; 2. Kelly-Anne Hibbert	6,455	6.23	+2.40
Great Australian	1. Steve Arrigo; 2. Angela Marcus	4,573	4.41	+4.41
Sustainable Australia	1. Lamaan White; 2. Richard Belcher	1,715	1.66	+1.66
Citizens	1. Trudy Campbell; 2. Peter Flynn	956	0.92	+0.48
United Australia	Raj Rajwin	593	0.57	−0.66
Total formal votes		103,617	96.92	+0.56
Informal votes		3,290	3.08	−0.56
Turnout		106,907	73.30	−4.91
Party total seats			Seats	±
Labor			1	Steady
Country Liberal			1	Steady

== See also ==
- Candidates of the 2022 Australian Senate election
