= List of historical political parties in Australia =

This is a list of historical political parties in Australia.

These parties are no longer registered or active at a federal, state or federal level. Historical names of defunct and current parties are not included in the list as they are not separate entities.

== Major parties ==
=== Federal parliamentary parties ===
Political party			Period	Main ideology	Position	Political alliance(s)	Maximum seats (Note: The party's seats is determined by the party's maximum number of seats acquired during its tenure.)	
Political party			Period	Main ideology	Position	Political alliance(s)	MPs	Senators
NP	—N/a	Nationalist Party	1917–1931	Nationalism; Liberal conservatism	Centre-right to right-wing	Nationalist–Country Coalition	53 / 75	34 / 36
UAP		United Australia Party	1931–1945	Liberal conservatism	Centre-right	United Australia–Country Coalition	34 / 76	26 / 36
FTP	—N/a	Free Trade Party	1901–1909	Economic liberalism	Centre-right	—N/a	28 / 75	17 / 36
PP	—N/a	Protectionist Party	1901–1909	Liberalism; Protectionism	Centre	—N/a	31 / 75	11 / 36
LIB	—N/a	Liberal Party	1909–1917	Liberalism	Centre to centre-right	Liberal Union	38 / 75	7 / 36
NLP	—N/a	National Labor Party	1916–1917	Nationalism	Centre-left	—N/a	14 / 75	9 / 36
LL	—N/a	Lang Labor	1931–1950	Economic nationalism (Langism)	Centre-left	—N/a	9 / 74	3 / 36
LU	—N/a	Liberal Union	1922–1925	Liberalism	Centre	—N/a	5 / 75	—N/a
DLP		Democratic Labor Party	1955–1974	Anti-communism	Right-wing to far-right	—N/a	7 / 124	5 / 60

=== State parliamentary parties ===
==== New South Wales ====
Political party		Period	Main ideology	Position	Leader	Political alliance(s)	Seats (Note: The party's seats is determined by the party's maximum number of seats acquired during its tenure.)	
Political party		Period	Main ideology	Position	Leader	Political alliance(s)	MLAs	MLCs (Note: The New South Wales Legislative Council was appointed by the Governor between 1855 and 1933.)
NP	Nationalist Party	1916–1931	Nationalism; Liberal conservatism	Centre-right to right-wing	Thomas Bavin (Note: Longest-serving party leader.)	Nationalist–Progressive coalition (1921); Nationalist–Country coalition (1927–1930)	52 / 90	58 / 74
LRP	Liberal Reform Party	1901–1917	Liberalism; Liberal conservatism	Centre-right	Charles Wade	—N/a	45 / 90	56 / 69
PP	Protectionist Party	1887–1901	Protectionism; Liberalism	Centre	George Dibbs	—N/a	66 / 137	23 / 84
PP	Progressive Party	1901–1907	Protectionism; Liberalism	—N/a	John See	—N/a	42 / 125	21 / 62
LL	Lang Labor	1931–1950	Langism	Centre-left	Jack Lang	—N/a	29 / 90	51 / 114
PP	Progressive Party	1920–1927	Conservatism; Agrarianism	Centre-right	—N/a	Nationalist–Progressive coalition (1921)	15 / 90	3 / 93
DP	Democratic Party	1920–1925	Catholic interests	Centre to centre-left	—N/a	—N/a	1 / 90	—N/a
PILP	Protestant Independent Labour Party	1923–1940s	Labourism; Protestantism; Social democracy	Centre-left	—N/a	—N/a	1 / 90	—N/a

==== Queensland ====
Political party			Period	Main ideology	Position	Leader	Political alliance(s)	Seats (Note: The party's seats is determined by the party's maximum number of seats acquired during its tenure.)	
Political party			Period	Main ideology	Position	Leader	Political alliance(s)	MLAs	MLCs (Note: Members of the Queensland Legislative Council were appointed by the Governor. In 1922 it was abolished.)
CPNP	—N/a	Country and Progressive National Party	1925–1936	Conservatism	Centre-right	Arthur Edward Moore	—N/a	43 / 72	—N/a
NAT		National Party (Note: The party held several names over its duration. By its dissolution it was named the "Queensland National Party" or the "National Party of Queensland".)	1915–2008	Conservatism; Agrarianism; Economic liberalism	Centre-right to right-wing	Frank Nicklin (Note: Longest-serving party leader.)	National–Liberal Coalition	49 / 89	—N/a
LIB		Liberal Party (Note: The party was established as the "Queensland People's Party" however later merged with the federal Liberal Party and changed its name to align with the federal branch.)	1943–2008	Liberalism; Liberal conservatism	Centre-right	Gordon Chalk	National–Liberal Coalition	30 / 82	—N/a
QLP		Queensland Labor Party	1944–1977	Social democracy Anti-communism	Centre-left	Vince Gair	—N/a	25 / 75	—N/a
UP	—N/a	United Party (Note: The party was originally called the "National Party", also called the "Nationalist Party". However by its dissolution was named the "United Party".)	1917–1925	Nationalism; Liberal conservatism	Centre-right to right-wing	Charles Taylor	—N/a	22 / 72	1 / 58
CCA	—N/a	City Country Alliance	1999–2003	Nationalism; Social conservatism	Right-wing	Bill Feldman	—N/a	6 / 89	—N/a
UAP		United Australia Party	1936–1944	Liberalism; Conservatism	Centre-right	Hugh Russell	—N/a	4 / 62	—N/a
NCP	—N/a	Northern Country Party	1919/20–1923	Agrarianism	—N/a	—N/a	—N/a	3 / 72	—N/a
CPA		Communist Party (Note: Also known as the "Queensland Communist Group" in its early years.)	1921–1991	Communism; Marxism–Leninism	Far-left	Jack Henry	—N/a	1 / 62	—N/a
PILP	—N/a	Protestant Independent Labour Party	1923–1940s	Labourism; Protestantism; Social democracy	Centre-left	—N/a	—N/a	1 / 62	—N/a
NQLP	—N/a	North Queensland Labor Party	1944–1977	Social democracy Populism	Centre-left	Tom Aikens	—N/a	1 / 75	—N/a
QP	—N/a	Queensland Party	2010–2012	Regionalism	Centre-right to right-wing	Aidan McLindon	—N/a	1 / 89	—N/a
NQF	—N/a	North Queensland First	2019–2021	North Queensland statehood Regionalism	Centre-right	Jason Costigan	—N/a	1 / 93	—N/a

==== South Australia ====
Political party			Period	Main ideology	Position	Leader	Political alliance(s)	Seats	
Political party			Period	Main ideology	Position	Leader	Political alliance(s)	MHAs	MLCs
LU	—N/a	Liberal Union	1910–1923	Liberalism; Liberal conservatism	Centre-right	—N/a	—N/a	25 / 46	14 / 18
LIB	—N/a	Liberal Federation	1923–1932	Liberalism; Liberal conservatism	Centre-right	—N/a	—N/a	23 / 46	16 / 20
NDL	—N/a	National Defence League	1891–1910	Liberalism; Liberal conservatism	Centre-right	—N/a	—N/a	18 / 54	15 / 18
FPPU	—N/a	Farmers and Producers Political Union	1904–1910	Agrarianism; Conservatism	Centre-right to right-wing	—N/a	—N/a	9 / 42	—N/a
LDU	—N/a	Liberal and Democratic Union	1906–1910	Liberalism	Centre-right	Archibald Peake	—N/a	9 / 42	—N/a
NP	—N/a	National Party; National Labor Party (February–June 1917); Progressive Country Party (1921)	1917–1923	Liberalism; Social democracy	Centre	—N/a	—N/a	6 / 46	—N/a
CP	—N/a	Country Party; Farmers and Settlers Association (1917–c. 1921)	1917–1932	Agrarianism; Conservatism	Centre-right to right-wing	—N/a	—N/a	5 / 46	3 / 20
PLP	—N/a	Parliamentary Labor Party	1931–1934	Social democracy	Centre-left	—N/a	—N/a	4 / 46	—N/a
LLP	—N/a	Lang Labor Party	1931–1934	Langism	Centre-left	—N/a	—N/a	3 / 46	—N/a
LM	—N/a	Liberal Movement	1973–1976	Liberalism; Progressivism	Centre-left	—N/a	—N/a	2 / 47	—N/a
AD		Australian Democrats	1977–2015	Liberalism	Centre	—N/a	—N/a	1 / 47	3 / 22
STL	—N/a	Single Tax League	1910s–1940s	Georgism	Centre	Edward Craigie	—N/a	1 / 39	—N/a
FFP		Family First Party	1977–2015	Social conservatism	Right-wing	—N/a	—N/a	—N/a	2 / 22
ASA		Advance SA	2017–2022	Social liberalism	Centre	John Darley	—N/a	—N/a	1 / 22
D4D		Dignity Party	2004–2019	Egalitarianism	Left-wing	Kelly Vincent	—N/a	—N/a	1 / 22
PLP	—N/a	Protestant Labor Party	1930s	Social democracy Monarchism	Centre-left	—N/a	—N/a	—N/a	1 / 20

==== Other states ====
Name	Period	Ideology
Western Australian Liberal Party	1911–1917	

== Other represented parties ==
=== Federal ===
Political party			Period	Ideology				
Political party			Period	Ideology	CON	Australian Conservatives	2017–2019	Conservatism; Economic liberalism
AP	—N/a	Australia Party	1969–1970	Anti-conscription; Social liberalism				
AMEP		Australian Motoring Enthusiast Party	2013–2016	Against anti-hooning laws				
AP		Australian Party	1929–1931	Populism; Anti-communism				
APA		Australian Progressive Alliance	2003–2005	Small-l-liberalism				
BMLP	—N/a	Blackburn-Mutton Labor Party	1947–1950					
CPP	—N/a	Country Progressive Party	1926–1930					
DHJP	—N/a	Derryn Hinch's Justice Party	2016–2019	Justice reform, Anti-paedophilia				
FFP	—N/a	Family First Party	2005–2011, 2014–2017	Social conservatism Christian right				
CNP		Fraser Anning's Conservative National Party	2019–2020	National conservatism Right-wing populism				
GLT	—N/a	Glenn Lazarus Team	2015–2016					
ISLP	—N/a	Industrial Socialist Labor Party	1919–1921	Socialism				
ALP (N-C)	—N/a	Labor (Non-Communist)	1940–1941	Labour politics Anti-communism				
LCP	—N/a	Liberal Country Party	1937–1943					
LM	—N/a	Liberal Movement	1972–1977	Social liberalism Progressivism				
MLP	—N/a	Majority Labor Party	1922–1923					
NA	—N/a	National Alliance	1974–1977					
NLP	—N/a	National Liberal Party	1974–1974	Anti-communism Social conservatism				
NDP	—N/a	Nuclear Disarmament Party	1984–1985, 1987–1988,	Nuclear disarmament				
PP	—N/a	Progress Party	1975–1981	Libertarianism; Anti-socialism				
PP	—N/a	Progressive Party	1920–1927	Socially conservative Agrarian socialism				
RTP	—N/a	Revenue Tariff Party	1903–1903					
RPT	—N/a	Rex Patrick Team	2020–2022					
TSISAP		Tim Storer Independent SA Party	2018–2019					
UAP	—N/a	Unite Australia Party	1986–1990					
VFU	—N/a	Victorian Farmers' Union	1916–1920	Pro-farmers				
WAP	—N/a	Western Australian Party	1906–1906					

=== State/territory only ===
Political party		State	Period	Ideology				
Political party		State	Period	Ideology	ABFFOC	A Better Future For Our Children	NSW	1995–2003
ASGC	Abolish Self Government Coalition	ACT	1992–1995					
ALP	Australian Liberal Party	VIC	1927–1932	Social liberalism Progressivism				
SEX	Australian Sex Party	VIC	2014–2017	Civil libertarianism Sex positivity				
CP	Centre Party	TAS	1969–1972					
CDP	Christian Democratic Party	NSW	1977–2022	National conservatism Christian right				
CCA	City Country Alliance	QLD	2000–2001	Australian nationalism Hansonism Social conservatism				
CPA	Communist Party of Australia	QLD	1944–1949	Communism; Marxism-Leninism				
CNO	Country-National Organisation	QLD	1941–1944					
DEM	Democratic Party	NSW	1922–1925	Pro-Catholic				
DP	Dignity Party	SA	2010–2018	Disability rights Equal rights				
ECP	Executive Country Party	WA	1923–1924					
FAM	Family Team	ACT	1979–1986	Social conservatism				
HCIP	Hare-Clark Independence Party	ACT	1991–1992					
IWP	Illawarra Workers Party	NSW	1987–1988					
ILG	Independent Labor Group	NSW	1959–1977					
IG	Independents Group	ACT	1989–1995					
LL	Lang Labor (SA)	SA	1931–1934	Langism				
LFF	Liberals for Forests	WA	2001	Anti-logging				
NCG	New Conservative Group	ACT	1991–1992	Conservatism				
NCP	New Country Party	WA	2003–2005	Australian nationalism Hansonism Social conservatism				
NLM	New Liberal Movement	SA	1976–1977	Liberalism				
NSGP	No Self Government Party	ACT	1989–1992					
NCP	North Queensland Labor Party	QLD	1944–1977	Socialism				
NCP	Northern Country Party	QLD	1920–1923					
NTN	Northern Territory Nationals	NT	1987–1990					
ON	One Nation NSW	NSW	2000–2007	Australian nationalism Protectionism				
PLP	Progressive Labor Party	1950–1955						
RP	Reason Party (Australia)	VIC	2017–2022	Civil libertarianism				
RL	Redistribution Liberals	VIC	1924–1926	Liberalism				
RLS	Reform the Legal System	NSW	1999–2007	Law reform				
RR	Residents Rally	ACT	1989–1992					
SAF	SA First	SA	1999–2002					
SA-BEST	SA Best	SA	2018–2026	Centrism				
SUPA	Seniors United Party of Australia	NSW	2022	Pensioners' interests				
STL	Single Tax League	SA	1930–1941	Georgism				
SLP	Socialist Labor Party	NSW	1920–1921	De Leonism				
TA	Territory Alliance	NT	2019–2020	Regionalism				
TMP	Transport Matters Party	VIC	2018–2023	Taxi industry advocacy				
UNI	Unity Party	NSW	1999–2007	Centrism; Multiculturalism				
VLP	Victorian Liberal Party	VIC	1954–1955	Liberalism				
V1LJ	Vote 1 Local Jobs	VIC	2014–2018	Regionalism				

== Parties without representation ==
Political party			Period	Ideology					
Political party			Period	Ideology	AEP	—N/a	Australian Equality Party	2014–2018	LGBT rights
AFAL		All for Australia League	1931–1932	Anti-establishment					
ANP	—N/a	Australian Nationalist Party	1958–1958	Anti-immigration					
ANA	—N/a	Australian National Alliance	1978–1981	Anti-immigration, Anti Asian					
AAHP		Australian Affordable Housing Party	2016–2022	Affordable housing					
AP		Australian Progressives	2014–2022	Progressivism					
APP	—N/a	Australian Protectionist Party	2011–2015	Anti-immigration; Anti-islam; Protectionism					
ANSP	—N/a	Australian National Socialist Party	1962–1968	Nazism; White supremacy					
AVP		Australian Values Party	2021–2023	Veterans' rights					
ASP	—N/a	Australian Sports Party	2013–2015						
AAPP	—N/a	Australian Antipaedophile Party	2015–2016	Family Court reform					
AAP		Advance Australia Party	1988-2005	Nationalism; Populism					
AAFI	—N/a	Australians Against Further Immigration	1989–2008	Anti-immigration; Nationalism					
ABFP	—N/a	Australian Better Families	2018–2021	Men's rights					
ACP	—N/a	Australian Commonwealth Party	1972–1972						
ACP	—N/a	Australian Conservative Party	1989–1991	Conservatism Agrarianism Economic liberalism					
ACP	—N/a	Australian Cyclists Party	2013–2017	Cycling issues					
AIPP	—N/a	Australia's Indigenous Peoples Party	1993–1999	Indigenous rights					
APP	—N/a	Australian People's Party	2014–2021	Australian nationalism Economic nationalism					
AWP	—N/a	Australian Women's Party	1995–2003	Feminism					
ARFP	—N/a	Australian Recreational Fishers Party	2016–2017	Recreational fishers' interests					
ARP	—N/a	Australian Reform Party	1997–2002	Gun rights					
AFLP	—N/a	Australian Fishing and Lifestyle Party	2006–2014	Fishing rights					
AFNPP	—N/a	Australia's First Nations Political Party	2011–2015	Indigenous rights					
ABRG	—N/a	Australian Bill of Rights Group	1995-1999	Bill of Rights					
ADM	—N/a	Australian Defence Movement	1940						
AMP		Australian Marijuana Party	1970s–1980s	Marijuana legalisation					
AMP	—N/a	Australian Motorist Party	2007-2012?	Motorist rights					
ADV	—N/a	Australian Defence Veterans Party	2015–2017	Veterans' rights					
AWP	—N/a	Australian Workers Party	2017–2021	Modern Monetary Theory; Social democracy					
ABP	—N/a	Aussie Battler Party	2018–2019	Right-wing populism					
BTFA	—N/a	Bullet Train for Australia	2013–2017	Pro high-speed rail in Australia					
CP	—N/a	Centre Party	1933–1935	Fascism					
CCC	—N/a	Climate Change Coalition	2007–2010						
CP	—N/a	Commonwealth Party	1943–1944	Conservative liberalism					
CCP	—N/a	Commonwealth Centre Party	1961–1961	Liberalism					
CPA	—N/a	Conservative Party of Australia	1984–1998	Conservation					
CNAP	—N/a	Combined New Australia Party	1990–1990						
CAP	—N/a	Confederate Action Party of Australia	1992–1993	Anti-socialism Right-wing populism					
CP	—N/a	Country Party (South Australia)	1917–1932						
CLA	—N/a	Curtin Labor Alliance	2001–2005	LaRouchism					
CA	—N/a	Carers Alliance	2007–2015	Social Justice Human Rights					
CA		Communist Alliance	2009–2012	Communism					
CM		CountryMinded	2014–2018	Agrarianism					
CRNT	—N/a	Consumer Rights & No-Tolls	2016–2018						
GRN		Cowper Greens	1989–1993						
DPI	—N/a	David Pollard Independent	2020-2024						
DS4SEQ	—N/a	Daylight Saving for South East Queensland	2008-2012	Daylight Saving in Queensland					
DSP	—N/a	Deadly Serious Party	1980s–1988	Joke					
DESP	—N/a	Defence and Ex-Services Party	1986–1989	Veterans' rights					
DOGS	—N/a	Defence of Government Schools	1966–1985						
DPA	—N/a	Democratic Party of Australia	1953–1954						
DSEL	—N/a	Democratic Socialist Electoral League	1998–2001	Socialism Social Democracy					
DCP	—N/a	Douglas Credit Party	1930s, 1960s-1970s	Social credit					
DPDA		Drew Pavlou Democratic Alliance	2021–2023	Pro-Taiwan Anti-China					
DLRA	—N/a	Drug Law Reform Australia	2013–2017	Drug policy reform					
GRN		Eastern Suburbs Greens	1990–1995						
EAPP	—N/a	Engineered Australia Plan Party	1982–1983						
ENEA	—N/a	Environmentalists for Nuclear Energy Australia	2007–2010	Pro-nuclear power in Australia					
ESSVP	—N/a	Ex-Service, Service and Veterans Party		Veterans' rights					
FPPU	—N/a	Farmers and Producers Political Union	1904–1910						
FPP	—N/a	Freedom and Prosperity Party	2009-2015						
FREE	—N/a	FREE Australia Party	2010–2014						
FLT	—N/a	Fair Land Tax - Tax Party	2010-2014						
FLRP	—N/a	Family Law Reform Party	1996-1999						
FFWA	—N/a	Fluoride Free WA	2017-2019	Oppose mandatory Water fluoridation					
FP	—N/a	Flux Party	2016-2022	Issue-based Direct democracy					
FIN		Federal ICAC Now	2020-2023	Federal ICAC advocacy, Anti-corruption					
G4C		Gamers 4 Croydon	2009–2010	Video game interests Progressivism; Environmentalism					
GA		Green Alliance Senate – NSW	1990–1995						
GRN		Greens in Lowe	1990–1995						
GP	—N/a	Grey Power	1983–1994	Pensioners' interests					
GAP	—N/a	Great Australians Party	2003–2006						
HOV	—N/a	Hear Our Voice	2007–2010	Social justice					
HAP	—N/a	Health Australia Party	2013–2024	Anti-vaccination					
HRP	—N/a	Human Rights Party	1999-2007	Law reform					
HPA	—N/a	Hope Party Australia	1997–2006						
IDP	—N/a	Independent Democratic Party	1953–1954						
IEFF	—N/a	Independent EFF	1987–1999						
IVFS	—N/a	Independent Voices for the Senate (Note: Also known as Voices for the Senate.)	2021–2023						
ILP	—N/a	Industrial Labor Party	1936–1939	Socialism Industrialisation					
IMOP		Informed Medical Options Party	2016–2023	Anti-vaccination					
LDP	—N/a	Liberal Democratic Party	1943–1944	Liberalism					
MAP	—N/a	Mature Australia Party	2014–2017						
MCP	—N/a	Middle Class Party	1943–1943						
LRG	—N/a	Liberal Reform Group	1966–1969	Anti-conscription Anti-war					
LEFBP	—N/a	Lower Excise Fuel and Beer Party	2001–2004	Beer Party Anti GST					
LAOL	—N/a	Love Australia or Leave	2016–2022	Anti-Islam; Anti-immigration					
MP	—N/a	Mutual Party	2014–2015						
LPA	—N/a	Libertarian Party of Australia	1977–1980s	Libertarianism					
MPP	—N/a	Multicultural Progress Party	2014						
NDL	—N/a	National Defence League	1891–1910	Conservatism					
NP	—N/a	National Party (South Australia)	1917–1923						
NHP	—N/a	National Humanitarian Party	1983–1984						
NHHP	—N/a	No Hoo Haa Party	2002–2011						
NLP	—N/a	Natural Law Party	1990–1997	Pro-Transcendental Meditation					
NFA	—N/a	National Front of Australia	1977–1984	Anti-immigration					
NGSTP	—N/a	No GST Party	2001-2004	Anti GST					
NAN	—N/a	No Aircraft Noise	1995–1999	Anti-noise pollution					
NLTC	—N/a	No Land Tax Campaign	2014-2015	Anti Land tax					
NA	—N/a	National Action	1982-1991	White supremacy Fascism					
NSPA		National Socialist Party of Australia	1964-1977	White supremacy Nazism					
NENSM	—N/a	New England New State Movement							
OAM	—N/a	One Australia Movement	1986–1992	Christian politics					
OAP	—N/a	One Australia Party	1995–1999	Conservatism Economic nationalism Right-wing populism					
OLM	—N/a	Official Labour Movement	1953–1955	Progessivism					
OPA		One Parliament for Australia	1943–1943						
ODD		Online Direct Democracy	2007–2020	Digital direct democracy					
ORP	—N/a	Outdoor Recreation Party (Stop the Greens)	1996–2017						
PIP	—N/a	Pangallo Independents Party							
PPP	—N/a	Party! Party! Party!	1989–1989	Joke					
PPA	—N/a	Pirate Party Australia	2008–2021	Pirate politics E-democracy					
PPP	—N/a	Protestant People's Party	1946–1949	Protestant advocacy Monarchism Anti-Catholicism Australian nationalism					
PCP	—N/a	Progressive Conservative Party	1980–1980	White nationalism Anti-immigration, Anti Asian					
PCIRA	—N/a	Pensioner and Citizen Initiated Referendum Alliance	1982–1996	Pensioners rights Monarchism					
PPP	—N/a	People Power Party	2006–2006	Progressivism'					
PPV	—N/a	People Power Victoria – No Smart Meters	2014–2017	Anti introduction of smart meters					
PUAP	—N/a	Pauline's United Australia Party	2007–2010	Protectionism; Social conservatism					
RUAP	—N/a	Rise Up Australia Party	2013–2019	Anti-islam; Right-wing populism					
SCP	—N/a	Services and Citizens' Party	1943–1944						
SPA	—N/a	Services Party of Australia	1946–1946						
SRP	—N/a	Smokers' Rights Party	2012–2017	Smokers' Rights					
SDP	—N/a	Social Democratic Party	1980–1983	Social democracy					
RFG	—N/a	Referendum First Group	1984–1984						
RPA	—N/a	Republican Party of Australia	1982–2021	Republicanism					
RA	—N/a	Reclaim Australia: Reduce Immigration	1996–1999	Anti-immigration					
STRAH	—N/a	Save the RAH	2010–2010	Anti relocation of the Royal Adelaide Hospital					
RDSDA	—N/a	Restore Democracy Sack Dan Andrews Party	2022–2023	Anti-Daniel Andrews					
RWRP	—N/a	Restore the Workers' Rights Party	2007–2011	Workers rights Trade unionism					
SOS	—N/a	Save Our State	1990–2010						
GRN		South Sydney Greens	1990–1995						
SLP	—N/a	State Labor Party	1940–1944	Communism					
SPGN	—N/a	Stop Population Growth Now	2014–2019?	Opposition to Overpopulation Anti-immigration					
SRWTP	—N/a	Sun Ripened Warm Tomato Party	1989–1989	Joke					
SP	—N/a	Surprise Party	1989–1989	Joke					
UCP	—N/a	United Christian Party	1972–1983	Christian politics					
UTG		United Tasmania Group	1972–1990	Green politics Environmentalism					
TST	—N/a	Tasmania Senate Team	1992–1996	Regionalism					
TFP	—N/a	Tasmania First Party	1996–2006	Regionalism; Gun rights					
TOPS	—N/a	Taxi Operators Political Service	1997–2001						
MHP		The Australian Mental Health Party	2016–2020	Mental health advocacy					
TBRNR	—N/a	The Basics Rock 'n' Roll Party	2014						
GA		The Victorian Green Alliance	1990–1996						
WP	—N/a	The Women's Party	2019–2021	Representation parity Liberal feminism					
TNL		The New Liberals	2019–2023	Social liberalism Republicanism					
VSP	—N/a	Victorian Socialist Party	1906–1932	Socialism; Entryism					
VIC	—N/a	Victorians Party	2021–2022	Centrism					
VEP	—N/a	Voluntary Euthanasia Party	2013–2021	Voluntary euthanasia					
VFTW	—N/a	Voice for the West	2014–2015	Localism					
WWW	—N/a	What Women Want	2007–2010	Women's rights					
WLP		WikiLeaks Party	2013–2015	Pro-Julian Assange					
GRN		Western Suburbs Greens	1990–1995						
YVA	—N/a	Yellow Vest Australia	2015–2020	Anti-islam; Right-wing populism					
YANP	—N/a	Young Australia National Party	1909–1915	Pro-White Australia					

== See also ==
- Politics of Australia
- List of political parties in Australia
- List of ruling political parties by country
