= Martine Delaney =

Australian trans activist

Martine Delaney (born 15 October 1957) is an Australian trans rights activist and former soccer player who became the first transgender woman to be inducted into the Tasmanian Honour Roll of Women in 2021. She first rose to prominence in 2005 when she received national press attention after joining a female soccer team following her transition.

== Sports career ==
Prior to her transition, Delaney played in men's soccer teams in Tasmania for twenty-five years. In 2005, after her transition, she joined Clarence United, a women's soccer team, becoming the first Australian to play in both men and women's soccer teams. A decision made later that year by Soccer Tasmania to permit Delaney to continue to play for the team was subsequently upheld by Football Federation Australia (now Football Australia), the national governing body for the sport. Delaney went on to advise Football Australia and the Australian Football League on the development of trans-inclusive policies.

Since retiring from sport, Delaney has continued to advocate for the rights of trans athletes in sport. In 2022, she criticised the global swimming federation FINA for issuing a blanket ban on the participation of trans women in elite swimming competitions, calling their actions an "inherently discriminatory response". Delaney has long been critical of complaints that trans female athletes have enhanced muscle mass compared to their biological female counterparts, citing the impact of regular oestrogen use as negating such advantages.

== Activism ==
In 2003, Delaney joined the Equal Rights Network (ERN) and subsequently became an active member of the Tasmanian Gay and Lesbian Rights Group (now known as Equality Tasmania). She has also served as a board member of Working It Out. Delaney is also a member of Tasmania Police's LGBT reference group.

Since 2004, Delaney has called on Tasmanian politicians to change the state's legal recognition of gender, and in 2017 co-founded Transforming Tasmania which advocates for trans right on a state level. In 2018, she called on the Tasmanian government to end mandatory divorce in cases when one spouse legally changed their gender.

In 2019, the Tasmanian government passed legislation that made the inclusion of gender on birth certificates optional, alongside permitting people over the age of 16 the right to change their registered gender without the requirement of first undergoing gender affirmation surgery.

On a national level in 2006, Delaney began lobbying the Australian government to reform gender markers on Australian passports. In 2011, she worked with the Department of Foreign Affairs to review passport regulations, which led to trans people having their chosen gender represented on their travel documents. Delaney also advocated for marriage equality, and was a founding member of both the Australian Coalition for Equality and Australian Marriage Equality. Same-sex marriage was ultimately legalised in Australia in 2017.

== Politics ==
In 2015, Delaney announced her intention to become Australia's first transgender federal politician as a candidate for the Division of Franklin within the House of Representatives; she was endorsed by the Greens. Delaney ultimately placed third, with 9,293 votes (13.35% of the total vote), losing out to the Labor incumbent Julie Collins; this represented a 1.17% increase in the Green vote share.

In 2024, she announced her candidacy for the 2024 Tasmanian state election as an independent candidate, but registered as a candidate for the Local Network party.

== Writing ==
Delaney co-wrote two episodes for the second season of the children's drama series First Day. The show, which follows a 12-year-old trans girl navigating her first year of high school, has won an International Emmy Award and the Rose d'Or.

As a journalist, Delaney has written for The Guardian and The Mercury.

== Recognition ==
In 2013, Delaney was recognised as a "human book" by the Hobart Human Library. Entitled Sex Change Soccer Star Cyber Tranny Granny, it recognised her "courage and resilience" and her role in raising the visibility of trans people in Tasmania.

In 2021, Delaney was inducted into the Tasmanian Honour Roll of Women for services to "human rights; justice and corrections; community advocacy and inclusion; and sport and recreation". She was the first trans woman to be an inductee.

== Personal life ==
Delaney transitioned in 2003. As of 2013, she lives with her partner and daughter in Tasmania.
