= List of ideologies named after people =

This list contains names of ideological systems, movements and trends named after persons. The stem may be either a person's real name or a nickname. Some of the eponyms are given by people adhering to the movements mentioned, others by outsiders.

== Social and political ==
- Ambedkarism, after B. R. Ambedkar
- Artiguism, after José Gervasio Artigas
- Assadism, after Hafez al-Assad
- Berlusconism, after Silvio Berlusconi
- Bevanism, after Aneurin Bevan
- Bidenism, after Joe Biden
- Bismarckism, after Otto von Bismarck
- Blairism, after Tony Blair
- Blanquism, after Louis Auguste Blanqui
- Bolivarianism, after Simón Bolívar
- Bonapartism, after Napoleon Bonaparte
- Brezhnevism, after Leonid Brezhnev
- Buharism, after Muhammadu Buhari
- Bushism, after George W. Bush
- Caesarism, after Julius Caesar
- Cameronism, after David Cameron
- Canovismo, after Antonio Cánovas del Castillo
- Cardenism, after Lázaro Cárdenas
- Carlism, after Infante Carlos, Count of Molina
- Carlotism, after Carlota Joaquina of Spain
- Castroism, after Fidel and Raúl Castro
- Chavismo, after Hugo Chávez
- Ceausism, after Nicolae Ceausescu
- Chiracism, after Jacques Chirac
- Clintonism, after Bill and Hillary Clinton
- Cobdenism, after Richard Cobden
- Colbertism, after Jean-Baptiste Colbert
- Corbynism, after Jeremy Corbyn
- Craxism, after Bettino Craxi
- De Leonism, after Daniel De Leon
- Deng Xiaoping Theory, after Deng Xiaoping
- Đilasism, after Milovan Đilas
- Duterteism, after Rodrigo Duterte and Sara Duterte
- Engelsism, after Friedrich Engels
- Erdoğanism, after Recep Tayyip Erdoğan
- Evoism, after Evo Morales
- Fabianism, after Quintus Fabius Maximus Verrucosus
- Fortuynism, after Pim Fortuyn
- Fourierism, after Charles Fourier
- Francoism, after Francisco Franco
- Fujimorism after Alberto Fujimori
- Gaddafism, after Muammar Gaddafi
- Gaitskellism, after Hugh Gaitskell
- Gladstonian Liberalism, after William Ewart Gladstone
- Gandhism, after Mahatma Gandhi
- Garveyism, after Marcus Garvey
- Gaullism, after Charles de Gaulle
- Gorbachevism, after Mikhail Gorbachev
- Gruevskism, after Nikola Gruevski
- Guevarism, after Che Guevara
- Haiderism, after Jörg Haider
- Hansonism, after Pauline Hanson
- Herrerism, after Luis Alberto de Herrera
- Hitlerism (best known as Nazism), after Adolf Hitler
- Ho Chi Minh Thought, after Ho Chi Minh
- Hoppeanism, after Hans-Herman Hoppe
- Houphouëtism, after Félix Houphouët-Boigny
- Hoxhaism, after Enver Hoxha
- Husakism, after Gustáv Husák
- Jacksonian democracy, after Andrew Jackson
- Jacobinism, after Jacobins
- Jacobitism, after James II of England
- Jeffersonian democracy, after Thomas Jefferson
- Josephinism, after Joseph II, Holy Roman Emperor
- Kádárism, after János Kádár
- Kahanism, after Meir Kahane
- Katterism, after Bob Katter
- Kemalism, after Mustafa Kemal Atatürk
- Khomeinism, after Ruhollah Khomeini
- Khrushchevism, after Nikita Khrushchev
- Korwinism, after Janusz Korwin-Mikke
- Kimilsungism, after Kim Il-sung
- Kimilsungism-Kimjongilism, after Kim Il-sung and Kim Jong-il
- Kirchnerism, after Néstor and Cristina Fernández de Kirchner
- Klausism, after Václav Klaus
- Kurzism, after Sebastian Kurz
- Langism, after Jack Lang
- Lassallism, after Ferdinand Lassalle
- Leninism, after Vladimir Lenin
- Longism, after Huey Long
- Lulism, after Luiz Inácio Lula da Silva and Dilma Rousseff
- Lumumbism, after Patrice Lumumba
- Luxemburgism, after Rosa Luxemburg
- Machiavellianism, after Niccolò Machiavelli
- Macronism, after Emmanuel Macron
- Maduroism, after Nicolás Maduro
- Magonism, after Ricardo Flores Magón
- Makhnovism, after Nestor Makhno
- Marhaenism, after Sukarno
- Maoism, after Mao Zedong
- Marxism, after Karl Marx
- Maxtonism, after Graeme Maxton
- McCarthyism, after Joseph McCarthy
- Metaxism, after Ioannis Metaxas
- Mentzenism, after Sławomir Mentzen
- Mobutism, after Mobutu Sese Seko
- Möllemannism, after Jürgen Möllemann
- Mosleyism, after Oswald Mosley
- Mussolinism, after Benito Mussolini
- Nasserism, after Gamal Abdel Nasser
- Nehruism, after Jawaharlal Nehru
- Obamaism, after Barack Obama
- Orbanism after Viktor Orban
- Owenism, after Robert Owen
- Peronism, after Juan, Eva, and Isabel Perón
- Pinochetism, after Augusto Pinochet
- Prachanda Path, after Prachanda
- Poujadism, after Pierre Poujade
- Powellism, after Enoch Powell
- Putinism, after Vladimir Putin
- Rankovićism, after Aleksandar Ranković
- Saddamism, after Saddam Hussein
- Sandinismo, after Augusto César Sandino
- Sankarism, after Thomas Sankara
- Schumerism, after Chuck Schumer
- Shachtmanism, after Max Shachtman
- Stalinism, after Joseph Stalin
- Sternism, after Avraham Stern
- Strasserism, after Gregor and Otto Strasser
- Sunakism, after Rishi Sunak
- Thatcherism, after Margaret Thatcher
- Titoism, after Josip Broz Tito
- Trotskyism, after Leon Trotsky
- Trudeauism, after Pierre Trudeau
- Trumpism, after Donald Trump
- Tudjmanism, after Franjo Tuđman
- Uribism, after Álvaro Uribe
- Venizelism, after Eleftherios Venizelos
- Wäisi movement, after Bahawetdin Wäisev
- Wilhelminism, after Wilhelm II
- Wilsonianism, after Woodrow Wilson
- Xi Jinping Thought, after Xi Jinping
- Yeltsinism, after Boris Yeltsin
- Zacktivism, after Zack Polanski

== Religious and philosophical ==
- Acacian schism, after Acacius of Constantinople
- Ahmadiyya, after Ahmad, other name of Muhammad
- Alevi, after Ali
- Althusserian, after Louis Althusser
- Amish, after Jakob Ammann
- Apollinarism, after Apollinaris of Laodicea
- Arianism, after Christian theologian Arius
- Aristotelianism, after Aristotle
- Arminianism, after Jacobus Arminius
- Augustinism, after Augustine of Hippo
- Averroism, after Averroes
- Bábism, after Siyyid `Alí Muḥammad Shírází or the Báb
- Badawiyyah, after Ahmad al-Badawi
- Baháʼí Faith, after Bahá'u'lláh
- Basilidians, after Basilides
- Bektashi, after Haji Bektash Veli
- Benthamism, after Jeremy Bentham
- Buchmanism, after Frank N. D. Buchman
- Buddhism, after Buddha
- Calvinism, after John Calvin
- Cartesian dualism, after René Descartes
- Christianity, after Jesus Christ
- Confucianism, after Confucius
- Darqawa, after Muhammad al-Arabi al-Darqawi
- Dominican, after Saint Dominic
- Druze, after Ad-Darazi
- Epicureanism, after Epicurus
- Erastianism, after Thomas Erastus
- Eutychianism, after Eutyches
- Febronianism, after Justinus Febronius
- Franciscan Christianity, after Francis of Assisi
- Frankism, after Jacob Frank
- Feeneyism, after Leonard Feeney
- Foucauldianism, after Michel Foucault
- Gelasian doctrine, after Pope Gelasius I
- Georgism, after Henry George
- Gregorian Reform, after Pope Gregory VII
- Gülen movement, after Fethullah Gülen
- Halveti, after Pir Umar Halveti
- Hanafi, after Abū Ḥanīfa
- Hegelianism, after Georg Wilhelm Friedrich Hegel
- Hobbesianism, after Thomas Hobbes
- Hussites, after Jan Hus
- Hutterite, after Jakob Hutter
- Ismailism, after Isma'il ibn Jafar
- Jansenism, after Cornelius Jansen
- Jerrahi, after Muhammad Nureddin al-Jerrahi
- Jesuism (best known as Christianity), after Jesus
- Kantianism, after Immanuel Kant
- Kubrawiya, after Najmuddin Kubra
- Laestadianism, after Lars Levi Læstadius
- Luddites, after Ned Ludd
- Lutheranism and Neo-Lutheranism, after Church reformer Martin Luther
- Manichaeism or Manicheism, after Mani
- Marcionism, after Marcion of Sinope
- Marcosians, after Marcus
- Martinism, after Louis Claude de Saint-Martin
- Mazdakism, after Mazdak
- Mennonite, after Menno Simons
- Millerism or Millerite, after William Miller
- Mohism, after Mozi
- Montanism, after Montanus
- Muhammadism, after Muhammad
- Naqshbandi, after Baha-ud-Din Naqshband Bukhari
- Nestorianism, after Nestorius
- Nimatullahi, after Shah Ni'matullah Wali
- Novatianism, after Novatian
- Panglossianism, after "Dr. Pangloss", a character in Voltaire's "Candide"
- Paulicianism, after Paul of Samosata
- Pelagianism, after Pelagius
- Platonism and Neo-Platonism, after Plato
- Priscillianism, after Priscillian
- Puseyism, after Edward Bouverie Pusey
- Pyrrhonism, after Pyrrho
- Pythagoreanism, after Pythagoras
- Qadiriyyah, after Abdul-Qadir Gilani
- Qutbism, after Sayyid Qutb
- Randianism, after Ayn Rand
- Rastafari movement, after Ras Tafari
- Raëlism, after Claude Vorilhon or Raël
- Rifaiyyah, after Ahmed ar-Rifa'i
- Sabellianism, after Sabellius
- Safaviyeh, after Safi-ad-din Ardabili
- Saint-Simonianism after Henri de Saint-Simon
- Senussi, after Muhammad ibn Ali as-Senussi
- Shadhili, after Abul Hasan al-Shadhili
- Socinianism, after Lelio Sozzini
- Spinozism, after Baruch Spinoza
- Sri Aurobindo Ashram, after Sri Aurobindo
- Suhrawardiyya, after Abu al-Najib al-Suhrawardi
- Thomism, after Thomas Aquinas
- Tijaniyyah, after Ahmad al-Tijani
- Tolstoyism, after Leo Tolstoy
- Valentinianism, after Valentinus
- Wahhabism, after Muhammad ibn Abd-al-Wahhab
- Wycliffite, after John Wycliffe
- Yazidism, after Yazid I
- Zahediyeh, after Zahed Gilani
- Zoroastrianism, after Zoroaster
- Zwingliism, after Huldrych Zwingli

== Economic ==
- Abenomics, after Shinzo Abe
- Bidenomics, after Joe Biden
- Georgism, after Henry George
- Keynesian economics, after John Maynard Keynes
- Malthusianism, after Thomas Robert Malthus
- Orbanomics, after Viktor Orban
- Reaganomics, after Ronald Reagan
- Trumponomics, after Donald Trump

== Scientific ==
- Bayesianism, after Thomas Bayes
- Comtism, after Auguste Comte
- Darwinism, after Charles Darwin
- Lamarckism, after Jean-Baptiste Lamarck
- Lysenkoism, after Trofim Lysenko

== Other ==
- Flandersism, after Ned Flanders (considered fictional, seen in the animated comedy sitcom The Simpsons)
- Fordism, after Henry Ford
- Freudianism and post-Freudianism, after Sigmund Freud
- Masochism, after Leopold von Sacher-Masoch
- Sadism, after Marquis de Sade
- Social Darwinism, after Charles Darwin
- Taylorism, after Frederick Winslow Taylor
- Vaushism, after Ian Kochinski
- Victorianism, after Queen Victoria

== Political parties named after people ==
- 1-Pacman Party List, after Manny Pacquiao
- ANTAURO (backonym for National Alliance of Workers, Farmers, University Students, and Reservists), after Antauro Humala
- after Janusz Korwin-Mikke:
  - KORWiN (backonym for Coalition for the Renewal of the Republic of Liberty and Hope)
  - KWiN (backonym for Confederation Liberty and Independence)
- after Rodrigo Duterte:
  - Duterte Youth (backonym for Duty to Energize the Republic through the Enlightenment of the Youth Sectoral Party-list Organization)
  - DuterTen
- EVO People (backonym for We Are Returning to Obeying the People), after Evo Morales
- For South Tyrol with Widmann, after Thomas Widmann
- JWA List, after Jürgen Wirth Anderlan
- KiBam, after Kiko Pangilinan and Bam Aquino
- KUCHMA Electoral Bloc of Political Parties (backonym for Constitution – Ukraine – Honour – Peace – Antifascism), after Leonid Kuchma
- LAPY (backonym for What Yaracuy Achieved), after Eduardo Lapi
- Lega per Salvini Premier, after Matteo Salvini
- LEPEN (backonym for Popular Greek Patriotic Union), after Jean-Marie Le Pen
- List of Marjan Šarec, after Marjan Šarec
- Lytvyn Bloc, after Volodymyr Lytvyn
- Madeleine Petrovic List, after Madeleine Petrovic
- Party for a Rule of Law Offensive (official abbreviation: Schill), after Ronald Schill
- Party of Alenka Bratušek, after Alenka Bratušek
- Party of Miro Cerar, after Miro Cerar
- Party of the U (backonym for Union Party for the People), after Álvaro Uribe
- Peter Pilz List, after Peter Pilz
- Petro Poroshenko Bloc, after Petro Poroshenko
- Pro-Park New Party, after Park Geun-hye
- Sahra Wagenknecht Alliance, after Sahra Wagenknecht
- after Ilan Shor:
  - Șor Party
  - ȘOR (backonym for Chance. Duties. Realization.)
- Russian National Autonomous Party (often nicknamed Fencik Party), after Stefan Fencik
- Team Köllensperger, after Paul Köllensperger
- Team Robredo–Pangilinan, after Leni Robredo and Kiko Pangilinan
- Tomio Okamura's Dawn of Direct Democracy, after Tomio Okamura
- after Donald Trump:
  - Trumpet of Patriots
  - TRUMP (backonym for All United for the Union of Populist Movements)
- Yulia Tymoshenko Bloc, after Yulia Tymoshenko
