= Local Network =

Political party in Tasmania, Australia

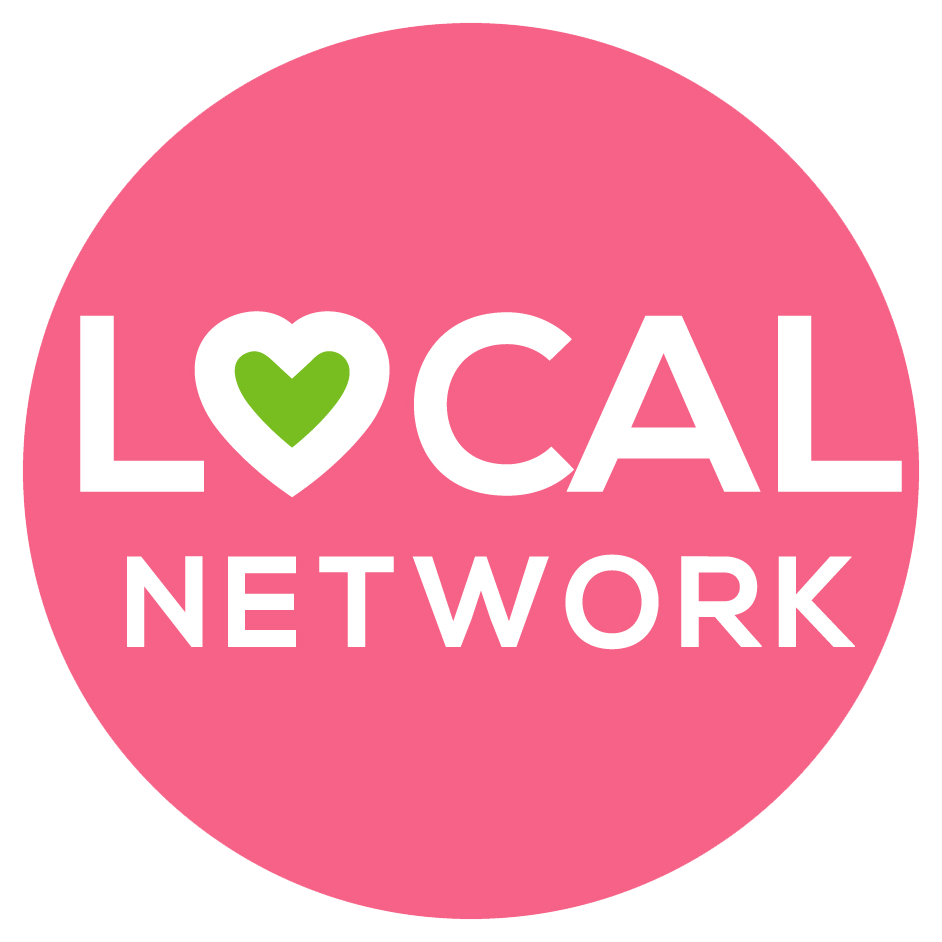
- Secretary: Leanne Minshull
- Registered Officer: Helen Middleton
- Committee Member: Andrew Schonfeldt
- Treasurer: Marly Flynn
- Founders: Anna Bateman; Craig Garland; Leanne Minshull
- Founded: 18 March 2021
- Registered: 9 March 2022
- Headquarters: 680 Huon Rd; Fern Tree, Tasmania
- Ideology: Hyperlocalism

Website
- https://www.localnetwork.au/

The Local Network, formerly known as The Local Party of Australia, is an Australian political party. It was founded in 2021 and is largely active in the state of Tasmania, however it does have a presence in South Australia.

The party was deregistered with the Australian Electoral Commission at its request on 16 October 2023, although it remains registered with the Tasmanian Electoral Commission.

== History ==
The party was founded by former Jacqui Lambie staffer Anna Bateman, Leanne Minshull from The Australia Institute think tank, and fisherman Craig Garland, who ran for the senate as an independent at the 2019 federal election. The party focuses on hyper-local issues, and aims to hold citizen assemblies to develop policies. The party was formally registered with the Australian Electoral Commission on 9 March 2022. Garland left the party in early 2022.

At the 2022 federal election, the party was endorsed by 3 trade unions, including 2 who were affiliated with the Labor Party.

The party contested the lower house seats of Braddon and Franklin, receiving 1.02% and 4.96% of the vote respectively. In the senate, they had 1.44% of the vote in Tasmania. In South Australia, veterans advocate Julie-Ann Finney led the ticket, which received 0.21% of the vote.

Climate 200, which supported the campaigns of a number of teal independents, also supported the party's senate campaign. This is in contrast to candidate Martine Delaney's statement on her campaign page, which stated that the party was similar to the "climate 200 lot", however without "Holmes à Court's millions".

In May 2023, the party was renamed the Local Network and applied to the Australian Electoral Commission and Tasmanian Electoral Commission to have the name formally changed.

In the 2024 Tasmanian state election, the Local Network ran 5 candidates in total, in the 2 urban electorates of Tasmania, 4 candidates for Clark and their lead candidate, former member of the Tasmanian Greens, Martine Delaney running for Franklin. All 5 candidates were unsuccessful, gaining less than 0.06 of a quota in Clark, and Delaney gaining a total of 0.06 of a quota in her own right in Franklin.

== Ideology and policies ==
The Local Network's constitution states that their candidates be given the freedom to act and vote independently, rather than be given any direction from the party, if elected.
