= Julie-Ann Finney =

Australian veteran's advocate

Julie-Ann Finney OAM
- Finney in 2026
- Occupation: Advocate
- Known for: Advocacy for veterans; campaign for the Royal Commission into Defence and Veteran Suicide
- Political party: Local (2021−2022)

Julie-Ann Finney is an Australian veterans' advocate known for campaigning for the establishment of the Royal Commission into Defence and Veteran Suicide.

The son of Finney, David Stafford, a Royal Australian Navy veteran and had been associated with the Australian Defence Force (ADF) for almost 20 years, committed suicide in 2019. In the aftermath, Finney became an advocate for changes in the treatment of ADF people, veterans and their families are treated and supported. Additionally, she created a petition for a royal commission which gathered more than 410,000 signatures. In 2020, the National Commissioner for Defence and Veteran Suicide Prevention was created by the Morrison government, followed by Royal Commission into Defence and Veteran Suicide in July 2021. In 2022, Finney unsuccessfully contested for a federal election to become the Senator for South Australia in the Senate as the top candidate of the Local Party of Australia. However, in that same year, she became a Commendation Winner in the South Australian Citizen of the Year.

== Advocacy ==
Finney had a 38-years old son, David Stafford, who was an ex-member of the Royal Australian Navy but committed suicide on 1 February 2019. Her son had been in the Australian Defence Force (ADF) for nearly 20 years. According to Finney, David was traumatised after he was made in charge of keeping the refugees on a boat. He later had suicidal thoughts as far back as 2009, and he made an attempt in 2016. After making a claim with the Department of Veterans' Affairs in March 2017, during which David had been hospitalized due to his PTSD and "suicidal ideation", David was medically discharged. As per Finney, he was released from the hospital without any arrangements being made for him by the Department of Defence upon his release.

After the death of her son, Finney lobbied for reform regarding the way ADF people and veterans, as well as their families, have been previously treated and should be treated in the future. She contributed to the revival of a petition for a royal commission into defence and veteran suicide, which received over 410,000 signatures. The Morrison government initially created the National Commissioner for Defence and Veteran Suicide Prevention in 2020. Followed by the launch of the Royal Commission into Defence and Veteran Suicide on 8 July 2021. The royal commission was credited to the efforts of Finney and Senator Jacqui Lambie.

In December 2021, Finney announced her candidacy for the Senate seat of South Australia on behalf of the Local Party of Australia. As a result of this, she was told by the commission's solicitors after making an application to give evidence in hearings in Canberra that she would not be allowed to give oral evidence in a public hearing prior to the federal election. In the following month, Finney criticised the ruling and claimed that running for political office should have nothing to do with her right to speak about her son's death before the commission. However, according to the commission, it was an independent body from politics and government and thought it proper to separate their process from political issues.

Finney ran for the Australian Senate in the Local Party for South Australia during the 2022 federal election, as the top candidate for her party in Group I. On 21 May, her total number of first preference votes was 171, while the above the line votes for the group was 2,190. This brought the total number of votes for the group to 2,389 (0.21%).

In October 2022, Finney took part in the Darwin commission hearings about the impact of isolation and Indigenous veterans and serving personnel. The circumstances of her son's death and his interactions with the Department of Defence were used by Finney to testify before the royal commission on 28 August 2023. She disclosed how her son was made to relive the death of his baby by being in a first-aid training class, where he lost his first son due to SIDS in 2007. At the time, more than 4100 submissions, of which more than 10% came from Victoria, have been received by the royal commission.

On 11 September 2024, after the final royal commission report submission, Finney spoke at the rally held outside the Parliament House in Canberra. As Veterans' Affairs Minister Matt Keogh brought up Finney along with other veterans calling for urgent action by the Albanese government concerning the report's 122 recommendations. In response to the final report, Finney expressed her support for the recommendations but also showed worry about the possibility of misinterpretation of some recommendations contrary to the actual intended meaning. She later gave evidence on 18 August 2025 before a hearing convened by the relevant parliamentary committee as a private individual in Parliament House, Canberra.

== Honours and awards ==
Finney received recognition in 2019 with the first ever Woman of the Year Award from The Advertiser and Sunday Mail. Following this, the Australia Day Council awarded her the Commendation Award for South Australia's Citizen of the Year 2022. In recognition of her contributions to veterans' welfare, Finney was appointed a Medal of the Order of Australia (OAM) in the 2025 King's Birthday Honours.
