= Langism =

Australian political ideology

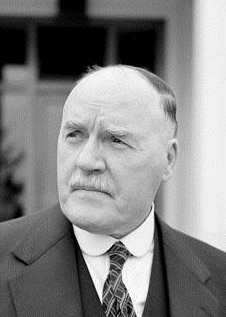
Jack Lang in 1946.

In Australian politics, largely in New South Wales, Langism is the politics, ideology, and style of governing of former New South Wales Premier and Labor Leader Jack Lang. Reaching its peak in the 1930s and 1940s around the period of Lang's Premiership (1930–1932), dismissal, and federal political career, Langism is largely characterised as a combination of political ideals of Jack Lang, including economic populism/nationalism (also left-wing populism), anti-austerity policies, Australian nationalism and anti-communism, much of which was laid out in the Lang Plan. Lang's opposition to reimbursing foreign debt and supporting lowering domestic interest rates gave Lang a reputation as a radical, a renegade, and even a dictator. After the sacking of Lang in 1932 by Governor Philip Game, the term Langism was used by conservatives and the United Australia Party as a pejorative and to smear the New South Wales Labor Party. Adherents of Langism, or his government and politics, are referred to as Langites.

== Ideology ==
Much of Langism centres around the economic policies and ideals of the Lang Government and Jack Lang himself. Lang's primary economic ideology came from his, along with his party's, proposal of the "Lang Plan", a deflationary economic proposal to help during the Great Depression. While never fully implemented (the Premiers' Plan being agreed to), the "Lang Plan" was considered to break with the economic orthodoxy at the time, initiating Lang's long-held reputation as being a radical or a renegade.

Premier for just seven months, Lang signed the Premiers' Plan on 10 June 1931.

Not uncommon within the Labor Party at the time, Lang's politics also included aspects of nationalism and conservatism, and received a comparison to Huey Long (politics), the former Governor of the U.S. state of Louisiana.

Lang grew increasingly conservative as he grew older, supporting the White Australia Policy after the rest of the labour movement had abandoned it. In I Remember he wrote: "White Australia must not be regarded as a mere political shibboleth. It was Australia's Magna Carta. Without that policy, this country would have been lost long ere this. It would have been engulfed in an Asian tidal wave."

== Critical reception ==
Throughout much of Lang's tenure as leader of the Labor Party in New South Wales, the term Langism was often used by political opponents to deride and criticise both him and the Labor Party. The Nationalist/United Australia Party and the Country Party throughout the country were the most vocal users of the term. With the likes of acting Premier of Tasmania Walter Lee praising the election of Bertram Stevens, following the dismissal of Lang in 1932, saying the party will “smash Langism throughout Australia.” In a 1927 article in the North West Champion (Moree), Langism was described as a “communist-controlled school of political thought.” Further adding: “Langism stands for the most crooked and questionable methods of government and departmental administration ever known in this or any other Australian state.”

Former Liberal Federal MP David Kemp, in A Democratic Nation: Identity, Freedom and Equality in Australia 1901–1925, wrote that “Lang constructed an ideology that later came to be known as 'Langism', based around class war rhetoric.” And added that, “He was an anti-capitalist populist who preferred his own dominance to that of the communists, and was comfortable with the concept of the class struggle, which he sought to convert into personal political power.”

== See also ==
- List of ideologies named after people
- Social democracy
- Australian nationalism
