= Federal ICAC Now =

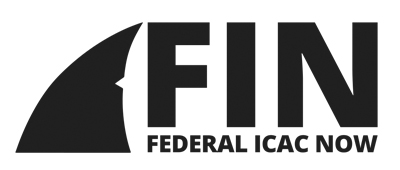
- Abbreviation: FIN
- Convenor: Ross Jones
- Founded: 29 June 2020; 5 years ago (Note: The idea of the party was first introduced on 12 May 2020, but not "founded" until the following month.)
- Registered: 2 September 2021
- Dissolved: 27 April 2023
- Headquarters: Surfers Paradise, Queensland
- Membership (2021): ▲ <536
- Ideology: Federal ICAC advocacy (Note: The party's main goal is to establish a Federal Independent Commission Against Corruption (ICAC).); Anti-corruption
- Colors: Black and white
- Slogan: “Australia's Anti-Corruption Party”

Website
- www.federalicacnow.org

The Federal ICAC Now, also known simply as FIN, was a single-issue political party in Australia formed in June 2020. Its creation was driven by the claimed need for an independent federal anti-corruption watchdog, similar to New South Wales, South Australia, and the Northern Territory.

Abbreviated to FIN, the party's logo includes the party name, abbreviation and the dorsal fin of a shark.

The party was deregistered on 27 April 2023.

== Foundation ==
In October 2020, the party lodged its first application to the Australian Electoral Commission (AEC), to gain federal approval as a political party, claiming it had 510 members. On 2 September 2021, the party's application as a registered political party was approved by the Australian Electoral Commission (AEC), and given a statement of reasons.

=== Objective ===
The party's objective, as stated on the party website is:

FIN will be a political party with just one objective – the establishment of an adequately funded, staffed and empowered Federal Independent Commission Against Corruption.

— federalicacnow.org
