= Results of the 2019 Australian federal election in Victoria =

2019 Australian federal election (Victoria)
← 2016	18 May 2019	2022 →

All 38 Victorian seats in the Australian House of Representatives and 6 seats in the Australian Senate
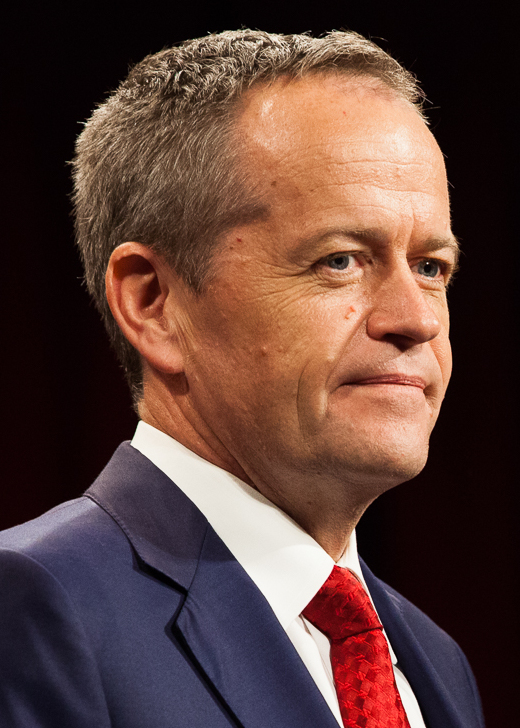

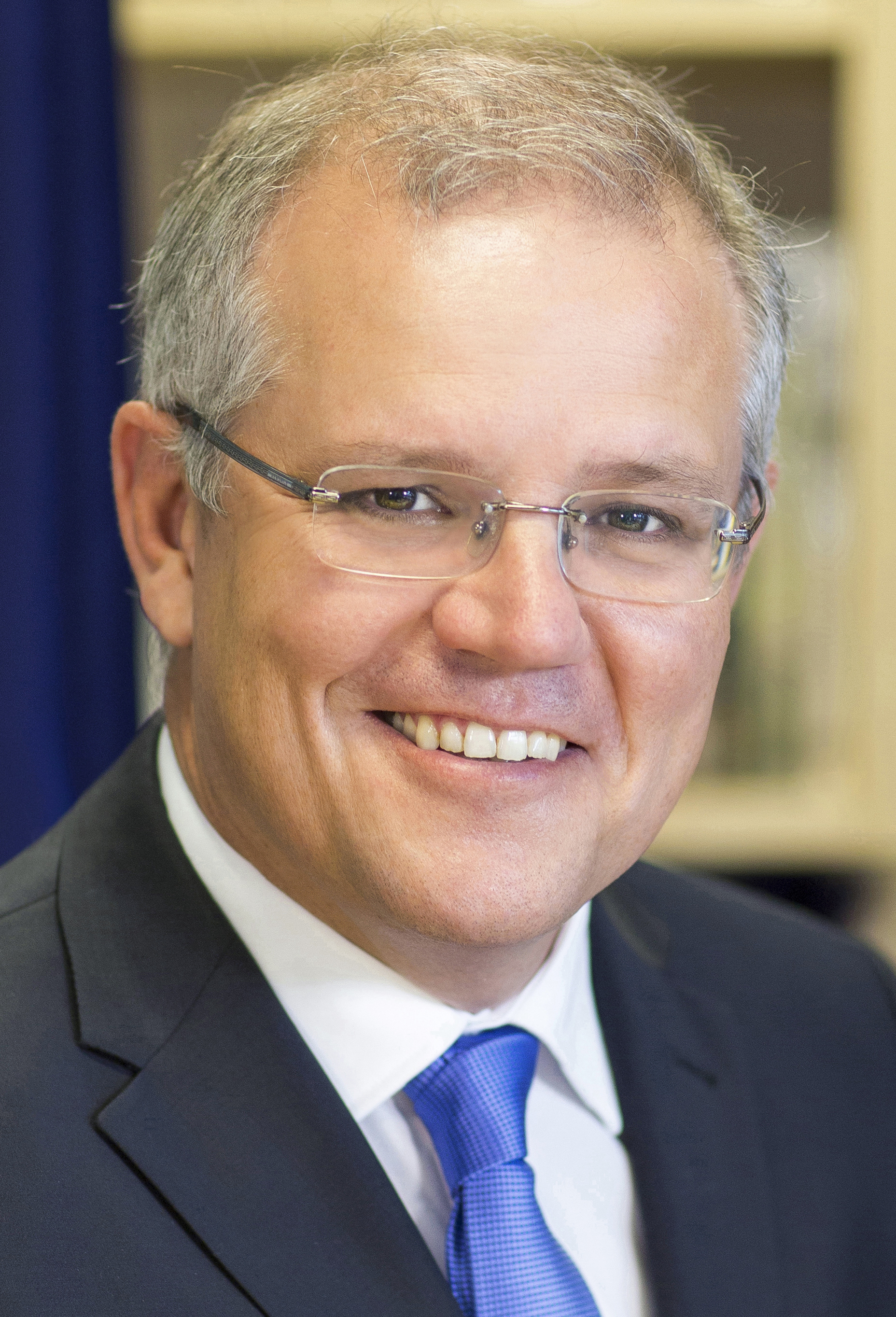

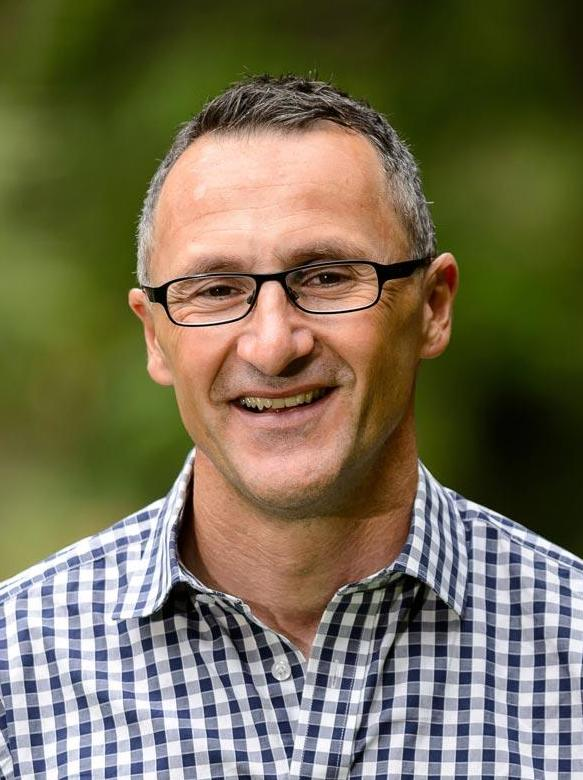
	First party	Second party	Third party
Leader	Bill Shorten	Scott Morrison	Richard Di Natale
Party	Labor	Liberal/National coalition	Greens
Last election	18 seats	17 seats	1 seat
Seats won	21 seats	15 seats	1 seat
Seat change	▲3	▼2	Steady
Popular vote	1,361,913	1,425,542	439,169
Percentage	36.86%	38.58%	11.89%
Swing	▲1.28	▼3.18	▼1.24
TPP	53.14%	46.86%
TPP swing	▲1.63	▼1.63
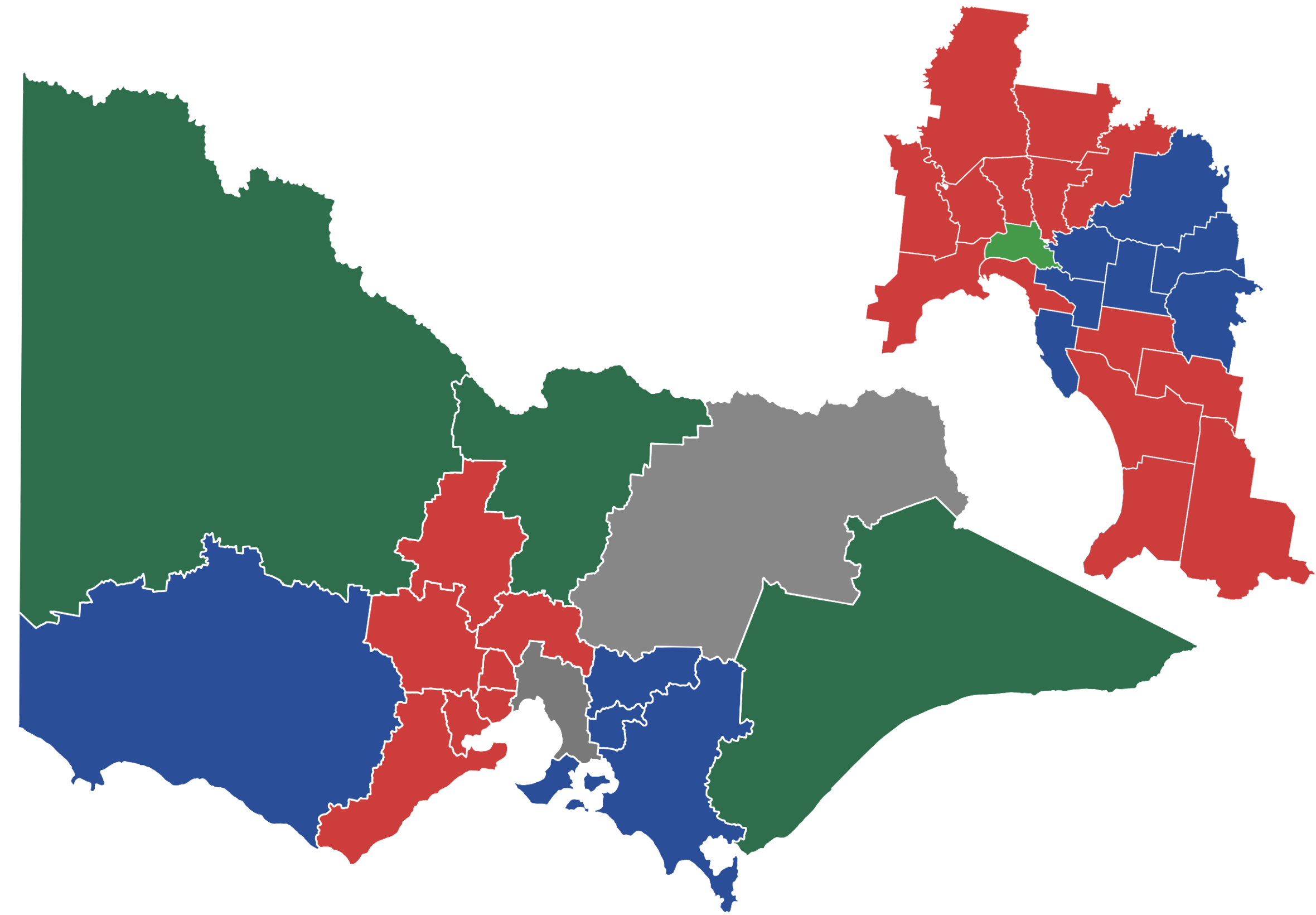
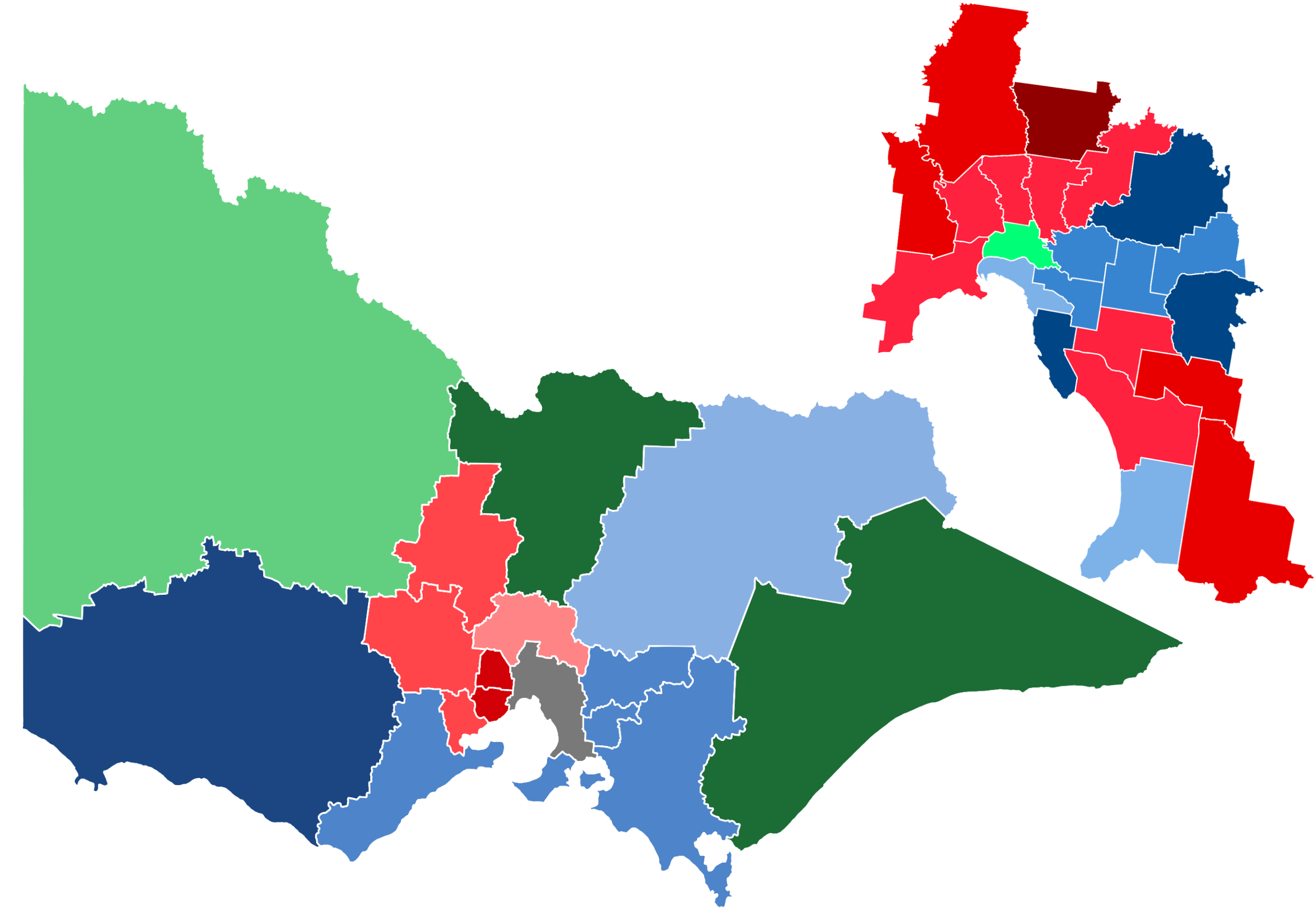
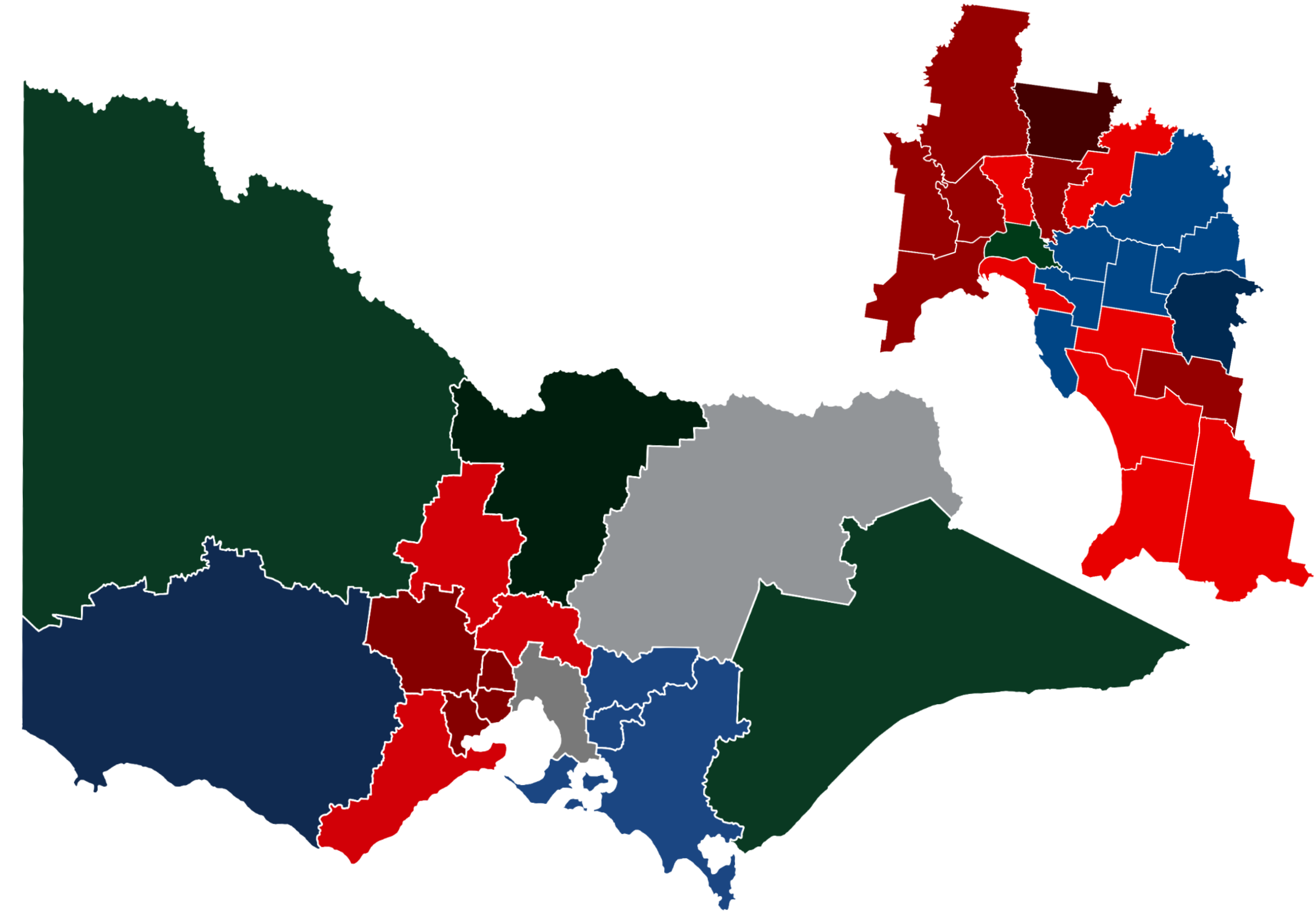

This is a list of electoral division results for the 2019 Australian federal election in the state of Victoria. Victoria bucked the national trend, seeing a swing from the Coalition to Labor, whereas the swing across Australia was from Labor to the Coalition.

This election was held using instant-runoff voting. At this election, there were two "turn-overs" in Victoria. Labor won the seats of Dunkley and Macnamara despite the Liberals finishing first; while an independent won the seat of Indi despite the Liberals finishing first.

== Overall results ==
Party	Votes	%	Swing	Seats	Change
Liberal/National Coalition
Liberal Party of Australia	1,288,805	34.88	−2.13	12	▼2
National Party of Australia	136,737	3.70	−1.05	3	Steady
Coalition total	1,425,542	38.58	-3.18	15	▼2
Australian Labor Party	1,361,913	36.86	+1.28	21	▲3
Australian Greens	439,169	11.89	−1.24	1	Steady
United Australia Party	134,581	3.64	+3.64		
Animal Justice Party	41,333	1.12	−0.77		
Pauline Hanson's One Nation	35,177	0.95	+0.95		
Derryn Hinch's Justice Party	26,803	0.73	+0.33		
Victorian Socialists	12,453	0.34	+0.34		
Shooters, Fishers and Farmers Party	12,384	0.34	+0.30		
Fraser Anning's Conservative National Party	11,504	0.31	+0.31		
Democratic Labour Party	11,397	0.31	+0.31		
Rise Up Australia Party	10,772	0.29	−0.86		
Reason Party	8,895	0.24	+0.24		
Sustainable Australia	6,809	0.18	+0.18		
Australia First Party	4,094	0.11	+0.02		
Citizens Electoral Council	3,267	0.09	+0.03		
The Great Australian Party	2,457	0.07	+0.07		
Socialist Equality Party	823	0.02	+0.01		
Science Party	497	0.01	+0.01		
Independent	144,043	3.90	+1.18	1	Steady
Non Affiliated	1,119	0.03	+0.03		
Total	3,695,032			38	▲1
Two-party-preferred vote
Labor	1,963,410	53.14	+1.31		
Liberal/National Coalition	1,731,622	46.86	−1.31		
Invalid/blank votes	180,426	4.66	−0.11		
Registered voters/turnout	4,184,076	92.62	+1.48		
Source: AEC Tally Room

== Results by division ==
=== Aston ===
2019 Australian federal election: Aston
Party	Candidate	Votes	%	±%
Liberal	Alan Tudge	54,744	54.69	+5.24
Labor	Kadira Pethiyagoda	29,839	29.81	−1.17
Greens	Asher Cookson	8,867	8.86	−0.14
United Australia	Matthew Sirianni-Duffy	3,611	3.61	+3.61
Democratic Labour	Anna Kennedy	3,029	3.03	+3.03
Total formal votes		100,090	96.32	+0.52
Informal votes		3,829	3.68	−0.52
Turnout		103,919	94.18	−0.69
Two-party-preferred result
Liberal	Alan Tudge	60,180	60.13	+2.72
Labor	Kadira Pethiyagoda	39,910	39.87	−2.72
Liberal hold		Swing	+2.72	

=== Ballarat ===
2019 Australian federal election: Ballarat
Party	Candidate	Votes	%	±%
Labor	Catherine King	49,077	47.79	+4.50
Liberal	Tim Vo	31,462	30.64	−4.05
Greens	Karen McAloon	9,077	8.84	−2.01
United Australia	Peter Cozyn	4,741	4.62	+4.62
Animal Justice	Bryn Hills	4,393	4.28	+4.28
Independent	Nick Shady	2,288	2.23	+2.23
Independent	Alex Graham	1,645	1.60	+1.60
Total formal votes		102,683	95.63	+0.92
Informal votes		4,689	4.37	−0.92
Turnout		107,372	93.40	+1.03
Two-party-preferred result
Labor	Catherine King	62,615	60.98	+3.62
Liberal	Tim Vo	40,068	39.02	−3.62
Labor hold		Swing	+3.62	

=== Bendigo ===
2019 Australian federal election: Bendigo
Party	Candidate	Votes	%	±%
Labor	Lisa Chesters	44,340	43.62	+5.06
Liberal	Sam Gayed	32,210	31.68	−6.06
Greens	Robert Holian	11,381	11.20	+0.29
One Nation	Vaughan Williams	6,278	6.18	+6.18
United Australia	Adam Veitch	4,321	4.25	+4.25
Conservative National	Julie Hoskin	1,667	1.64	+1.64
Rise Up Australia	Sharon Budde	1,464	1.44	−0.70
Total formal votes		101,661	95.93	+0.55
Informal votes		4,318	4.07	−0.55
Turnout		105,979	93.99	+0.51
Two-party-preferred result
Labor	Lisa Chesters	60,016	59.04	+5.17
Liberal	Sam Gayed	41,645	40.96	−5.17
Labor hold		Swing	+5.17	

=== Bruce ===
2019 Australian federal election: Bruce
Party	Candidate	Votes	%	±%
Labor	Julian Hill	51,713	55.58	+1.41
Liberal	John MacIsaac	27,170	29.20	−1.12
Greens	Rhonda Garad	6,801	7.31	+0.77
United Australia	Mubahil Ahmed	3,979	4.28	+4.28
Conservative National	Tim Boyanton	3,377	3.63	+3.63
Total formal votes		93,040	94.40	−0.26
Informal votes		5,521	5.60	+0.26
Turnout		98,561	90.26	−0.85
Two-party-preferred result
Labor	Julian Hill	59,689	64.15	+0.10
Liberal	John MacIsaac	33,351	35.85	−0.10
Labor hold		Swing	+0.10	

=== Calwell ===
2019 Australian federal election: Calwell
Party	Candidate	Votes	%	±%
Labor	Maria Vamvakinou	47,115	53.88	−4.80
Liberal	Genevieve Hamilton	21,978	25.13	−0.52
Greens	Polly Morgan	5,893	6.74	−1.27
Victorian Socialists	Jerome Small	3,984	4.56	+4.56
United Australia	Prakul Chhabra	3,037	3.47	+3.47
Citizens Electoral Council	Keith Kerr	2,851	3.26	+3.26
Conservative National	Adam Vail	1,771	2.03	+2.03
Socialist Equality	Peter Byrne	823	0.94	+0.94
Total formal votes		87,452	90.78	−2.34
Informal votes		8,884	9.22	+2.34
Turnout		96,336	89.61	+4.25
Two-party-preferred result
Labor	Maria Vamvakinou	60,164	68.80	−0.93
Liberal	Genevieve Hamilton	27,288	31.20	+0.93
Labor hold		Swing	−0.93	

=== Casey ===
2019 Australian federal election: Casey
Party	Candidate	Votes	%	±%
Liberal	Tony Smith	45,168	45.25	−2.29
Labor	Bill Brindle	28,551	28.60	+0.41
Greens	Jenny Game-Lopata	10,919	10.94	−1.90
Justice	Ryan Clark	3,309	3.31	+2.59
Animal Justice	Travis Barker	3,105	3.11	−1.19
United Australia	Wendy Starkey	2,607	2.61	+2.61
Independent	Peter Charleton	2,302	2.31	−0.32
Democratic Labour	Ross McPhee	2,246	2.25	+2.25
Rise Up Australia	Antony Calabro	820	0.82	−1.63
Great Australian	Jayden O'Connor	801	0.80	+0.80
Total formal votes		99,828	93.54	−2.43
Informal votes		6,892	6.46	+2.43
Turnout		106,720	94.19	+0.54
Two-party-preferred result
Liberal	Tony Smith	54,551	54.64	+0.10
Labor	Bill Brindle	45,277	45.36	−0.10
Liberal hold		Swing	+0.10	

=== Chisholm ===
2019 Australian federal election: Chisholm
Party	Candidate	Votes	%	±%
Liberal	Gladys Liu	41,172	43.38	−3.71
Labor	Jennifer Yang	32,561	34.30	−0.39
Greens	Luke Arthur	11,235	11.84	+0.30
Independent	Ian Dobby	2,319	2.44	+2.44
Justice	Anne Wicks	2,063	2.17	+2.17
Animal Justice	Rosemary Lavin	1,780	1.88	−0.24
Democratic Labour	Philip Jenkins	1,702	1.79	+1.79
United Australia	George Zoraya	1,517	1.60	+1.60
Rise Up Australia	Angela Dorian	571	0.60	−0.63
Total formal votes		94,920	95.51	−1.77
Informal votes		4,463	4.49	+1.77
Turnout		99,383	93.47	−0.96
Two-party-preferred result
Liberal	Gladys Liu	48,005	50.57	−2.34
Labor	Jennifer Yang	46,915	49.43	+2.34
Liberal hold		Swing	−2.34	

Julia Banks was elected as the Liberal member for Chisholm in 2016, but resigned from the party in November 2018 and sat as an independent. She unsuccessfully contested Flinders as an independent.

=== Cooper ===
2019 Australian federal election: Cooper
Party	Candidate	Votes	%	±%
Labor	Ged Kearney	45,601	46.78	+11.73
Greens	David Risstrom	20,605	21.14	−15.53
Liberal	Andrew Bell	19,012	19.50	−0.20
Victorian Socialists	Kath Larkin	4,125	4.23	+4.23
Animal Justice	Nadine Richings	2,476	2.54	+0.87
Reason	Sarah Russell	2,110	2.16	+2.16
United Australia	Brett Nangle	1,892	1.94	+1.94
Independent	Teresa van Lieshout	1,660	1.70	+1.70
Total formal votes		97,481	95.13	+2.77
Informal votes		4,986	4.87	−2.77
Turnout		102,467	92.45	+2.94
Notional two-party-preferred count
Labor	Ged Kearney	74,402	76.32	+4.23
Liberal	Andrew Bell	23,079	23.68	−4.23
Two-candidate-preferred result
Labor	Ged Kearney	63,017	64.65	+13.38
Greens	David Risstrom	34,464	35.35	−13.38
Labor hold		Swing	+13.38	

=== Corangamite ===
2019 Australian federal election: Corangamite
Party	Candidate	Votes	%	±%
Liberal	Sarah Henderson	43,017	42.33	−1.34
Labor	Libby Coker	36,047	35.47	+1.41
Greens	Simon Northeast	9,184	9.04	−3.05
Independent	Damien Cole	5,131	5.05	+5.05
Justice	Mandy Grimley	2,724	2.68	+0.41
United Australia	Neil Harvey	2,257	2.22	+2.22
Animal Justice	Naomi Adams	2,143	2.11	−0.13
Rise Up Australia	Ian Erskine	1,117	1.10	−0.07
Total formal votes		101,620	96.03	+0.73
Informal votes		4,196	3.97	−0.73
Turnout		105,816	94.82	+3.83
Two-party-preferred result
Labor	Libby Coker	51,895	51.07	+1.04
Liberal	Sarah Henderson	49,725	48.93	−1.04
Labor notional hold		Swing	+1.04	

As a result of the 2018 boundary redistribution, the Liberal-held seats of Corangamite and Dunkley became notionally marginal Labor seats.

=== Corio ===
2019 Australian federal election: Corio
Party	Candidate	Votes	%	±%
Labor	Richard Marles	47,010	47.60	+4.18
Liberal	Alastair Thomson	33,426	33.85	−2.78
Greens	Amber Forbes	12,902	13.07	+1.38
United Australia	Desmond Sanborn	5,414	5.48	+5.48
Total formal votes		98,752	96.44	+1.10
Informal votes		3,648	3.56	−1.10
Turnout		102,400	92.83	+0.70
Two-party-preferred result
Labor	Richard Marles	59,572	60.32	+2.12
Liberal	Alastair Thomson	39,180	39.68	−2.12
Labor hold		Swing	+2.12	

=== Deakin ===
2019 Australian federal election: Deakin
Party	Candidate	Votes	%	±%
Liberal	Michael Sukkar	46,536	47.84	−2.47
Labor	Shireen Morris	31,648	32.54	+2.46
Greens	Sophia Sun	8,730	8.98	−2.37
Justice	Ellie Sullivan	3,386	3.48	+3.48
United Australia	Milton Wilde	1,997	2.05	+2.05
Animal Justice	Vinita Costantino	1,964	2.02	−0.96
Independent	Vickie Janson	1,614	1.66	+1.66
Democratic Labour	Joel van der Horst	1,394	1.43	+1.43
Total formal votes		97,269	95.90	−1.09
Informal votes		4,155	4.10	+1.09
Turnout		101,424	94.35	−0.64
Two-party-preferred result
Liberal	Michael Sukkar	53,288	54.78	−1.66
Labor	Shireen Morris	43,981	45.22	+1.66
Liberal hold		Swing	−1.66	

=== Dunkley ===
2019 Australian federal election: Dunkley
Party	Candidate	Votes	%	±%
Liberal	Chris Crewther	38,616	39.88	−1.22
Labor	Peta Murphy	37,301	38.52	+2.00
Greens	Emily Green	8,125	8.39	−1.09
Justice	Lachlan O'Connell	5,027	5.19	+0.19
Animal Justice	Elizabeth Johnston	2,961	3.06	+0.18
United Australia	Ron Jean	2,513	2.60	+2.60
Conservative National	Christopher James	1,337	1.38	+1.38
Rise Up Australia	Yvonne Gentle	948	0.98	+0.34
Total formal votes		96,828	94.86	+0.90
Informal votes		5,250	5.14	−0.90
Turnout		102,078	92.26	+1.10
Two-party-preferred result
Labor	Peta Murphy	51,066	52.74	+1.71
Liberal	Chris Crewther	45,762	47.26	−1.71
Labor notional hold		Swing	+1.71	

As a result of the 2018 boundary redistribution, the Liberal-held seats of Corangamite and Dunkley became notionally marginal Labor seats.

=== Flinders ===
2019 Australian federal election: Flinders
Party	Candidate	Votes	%	±%
Liberal	Greg Hunt	45,293	46.72	−3.78
Labor	Josh Sinclair	23,982	24.74	−2.80
Independent	Julia Banks	13,367	13.79	+13.79
Greens	Nathan Lesslie	6,599	6.81	−4.18
United Australia	Christine McShane	2,447	2.52	+2.52
Animal Justice	James Persson	2,304	2.38	−1.45
Sustainable Australia	Reade Smith	1,072	1.11	+1.11
Independent	Susie Beveridge	948	0.98	+0.98
Independent	Harry Dreger	940	0.97	+0.97
Total formal votes		96,952	94.06	−1.90
Informal votes		6,124	5.94	+1.90
Turnout		103,076	93.11	+2.28
Two-party-preferred result
Liberal	Greg Hunt	53,943	55.64	−1.37
Labor	Josh Sinclair	43,009	44.36	+1.37
Liberal hold		Swing	−1.37	

=== Fraser ===
2019 Australian federal election: Fraser
Party	Candidate	Votes	%	±%
Labor	Daniel Mulino	46,709	50.46	−8.05
Liberal	Peter Bain	23,929	25.85	+0.47
Greens	Rebecca Scorgie	7,645	8.26	−1.50
United Australia	Vinh Van Chau	7,314	7.90	+7.90
Independent	Van Tran	5,306	5.73	+4.25
Great Australian	Tony Dobran	1,656	1.79	+1.79
Total formal votes		92,559	93.87	−0.48
Informal votes		6,046	6.13	+0.48
Turnout		98,605	90.13	+1.25
Two-party-preferred result
Labor	Daniel Mulino	59,403	64.18	−5.61
Liberal	Peter Bain	33,156	35.82	+5.61
Labor notional hold		Swing	−5.61	

Fraser was a new seat as a result of the 2018 boundary redistribution and was notionally held by Labor with a margin of 19.79%.

=== Gellibrand ===
2019 Australian federal election: Gellibrand
Party	Candidate	Votes	%	±%
Labor	Tim Watts	47,942	48.66	+2.43
Liberal	Anthony Mitchell	28,895	29.33	−0.46
Greens	Bernadette Thomas	16,303	16.55	−2.40
United Australia	Lisa Bentley	5,391	5.47	+5.47
Total formal votes		98,531	96.49	+0.40
Informal votes		3,582	3.51	−0.40
Turnout		102,113	91.83	+2.77
Two-party-preferred result
Labor	Tim Watts	63,878	64.83	−0.29
Liberal	Anthony Mitchell	34,653	35.17	+0.29
Labor hold		Swing	−0.29	

=== Gippsland ===
2019 Australian federal election: Gippsland
Party	Candidate	Votes	%	±%
National	Darren Chester	52,202	54.00	−1.84
Labor	Antoinette Holm	22,426	23.20	+2.99
Shooters, Fishers, Farmers	David Snelling	6,872	7.11	+7.11
Greens	Deb Foskey	5,835	6.04	−1.79
United Australia	Kerri Brewer	4,257	4.40	+4.40
Independent	Sonia Buckley	3,043	3.15	+3.15
Conservative National	Neville Tickner	2,043	2.11	+2.11
Total formal votes		96,678	94.78	+1.64
Informal votes		5,320	5.22	−1.64
Turnout		101,998	92.27	−0.58
Two-party-preferred result
National	Darren Chester	64,456	66.67	−1.54
Labor	Antoinette Holm	32,222	33.33	+1.54
National hold		Swing	−1.54	

=== Goldstein ===
2019 Australian federal election: Goldstein
Party	Candidate	Votes	%	±%
Liberal	Tim Wilson	52,320	52.67	−3.66
Labor	Daniel Pollock	28,118	28.31	+6.43
Greens	Sue Pennicuik	13,951	14.04	−1.86
United Australia	Wayne Connolly	1,945	1.96	+1.96
Sustainable Australia	Brandon Hoult	1,653	1.66	+1.66
Independent	John Tiger Casley	1,349	1.36	+1.36
Total formal votes		99,336	97.79	+0.25
Informal votes		2,244	2.21	−0.25
Turnout		101,580	93.61	+2.19
Two-party-preferred result
Liberal	Tim Wilson	57,408	57.79	−4.89
Labor	Daniel Pollock	41,928	42.21	+4.89
Liberal hold		Swing	−4.89	

=== Gorton ===
2019 Australian federal election: Gorton
Party	Candidate	Votes	%	±%
Labor	Brendan O'Connor	47,398	50.08	−11.16
Liberal	Nathan Di Noia	24,677	26.07	−2.69
Independent	Jarrod Bingham	8,363	8.84	+8.84
United Australia	Richard Turton	7,473	7.90	+7.90
Greens	Harkirat Singh	6,730	7.11	−2.89
Total formal votes		94,641	94.08	−0.87
Informal votes		5,957	5.92	+0.87
Turnout		100,598	91.11	+4.10
Two-party-preferred result
Labor	Brendan O'Connor	61,861	65.36	−3.13
Liberal	Nathan Di Noia	32,780	34.64	+3.13
Labor hold		Swing	−3.13	

=== Higgins ===
2019 Australian federal election: Higgins
Party	Candidate	Votes	%	±%
Liberal	Katie Allen	48,091	47.86	−3.72
Labor	Fiona McLeod	25,498	25.38	+8.85
Greens	Jason Ball	22,573	22.47	−1.72
Animal Justice	Alicia Walker	1,729	1.72	+0.15
Sustainable Australia	Michaela Moran	1,338	1.33	+1.33
United Australia	Tim Ryan	1,249	1.24	+1.24
Total formal votes		100,478	97.99	+1.74
Informal votes		2,063	2.01	−1.74
Turnout		102,541	92.37	+1.49
Two-party-preferred result
Liberal	Katie Allen	54,139	53.88	−6.09
Labor	Fiona McLeod	46,339	46.12	+6.09
Liberal hold		Swing	−6.09	

=== Holt ===
2019 Australian federal election: Holt
Party	Candidate	Votes	%	±%
Labor	Anthony Byrne	48,031	50.73	+1.92
Liberal	Jennifer Van Den Broek	33,963	35.87	+2.11
Greens	Jess Wheelock	6,735	7.11	+0.59
United Australia	Jatinder Singh	5,958	6.29	+6.29
Total formal votes		94,687	95.88	+0.78
Informal votes		4,069	4.12	−0.78
Turnout		98,756	92.46	+4.39
Two-party-preferred result
Labor	Anthony Byrne	55,577	58.70	−1.24
Liberal	Jennifer Van Den Broek	39,110	41.30	+1.24
Labor hold		Swing	−1.24	

=== Hotham ===
2019 Australian federal election: Hotham
Party	Candidate	Votes	%	±%
Labor	Clare O'Neil	43,310	45.18	+2.10
Liberal	George Hua	37,447	39.06	−1.28
Greens	Jess Gonsalvez	8,722	9.10	+0.04
United Australia	Jin Luan	3,483	3.63	+3.63
Sustainable Australia	Dennis Bilic	1,772	1.85	+1.85
Rise Up Australia	Peter Dorian	1,134	1.18	−0.41
Total formal votes		95,868	96.21	+0.12
Informal votes		3,780	3.79	−0.12
Turnout		99,648	92.41	−0.89
Two-party-preferred result
Labor	Clare O'Neil	53,597	55.91	+1.70
Liberal	George Hua	42,271	44.09	−1.70
Labor hold		Swing	+1.70	

=== Indi ===
2019 Australian federal election: Indi
Party	Candidate	Votes	%	±%
Liberal	Steve Martin	35,426	35.09	+7.29
Independent	Helen Haines	32,664	32.35	−1.06
Labor	Eric Kerr	12,202	12.09	+2.03
National	Mark Byatt	9,538	9.45	−8.30
Greens	Helen Robinson	4,255	4.21	+0.25
United Australia	Shane Wheatland	3,980	3.94	+3.94
Justice	Jason Whalley	2,891	2.86	+2.86
Total formal votes		100,956	95.64	+2.21
Informal votes		4,601	4.36	−2.21
Turnout		105,557	93.60	+0.13
Notional two-party-preferred count
Liberal	Steve Martin	63,332	62.73	+7.72
Labor	Eric Kerr	37,624	37.27	−7.72
Two-candidate-preferred result
Independent	Helen Haines	51,886	51.39	−4.13
Liberal	Steve Martin	49,070	48.61	+4.13
Independent gain from Independent		Swing	−4.13	

Sitting member Cathy McGowan (independent) did not contest the election and endorsed the candidacy of Helen Haines (independent).

=== Isaacs ===
2019 Australian federal election: Isaacs
Party	Candidate	Votes	%	±%
Labor	Mark Dreyfus	43,364	44.78	+3.84
Liberal	Jeremy Hearn	34,089	35.20	−7.45
Greens	Kim Samiotis	10,822	11.18	+0.46
United Australia	Tony Seals	3,813	3.94	+3.94
Animal Justice	Bronwyn Currie	3,607	3.72	−0.62
Rise Up Australia	Ash Puvimanasinghe	1,142	1.18	+0.53
Total formal votes		96,837	95.86	−0.73
Informal votes		4,180	4.14	+0.73
Turnout		101,017	93.28	+1.03
Two-party-preferred result
Labor	Mark Dreyfus	54,645	56.43	+3.45
Liberal	Jeremy Hearn	42,192	43.57	−3.45
Labor hold		Swing	+3.45	

=== Jagajaga ===
2019 Australian federal election: Jagajaga
Party	Candidate	Votes	%	±%
Labor	Kate Thwaites	41,086	42.02	+0.90
Liberal	Richard Welch	37,755	38.62	−1.47
Greens	Paul Kennedy	13,929	14.25	+0.82
United Australia	Maria Rigoni	3,652	3.74	+3.74
Rise Up Australia	Jeff Truscott	1,345	1.38	+1.38
Total formal votes		97,767	96.86	−0.07
Informal votes		3,169	3.14	+0.07
Turnout		100,936	93.85	+0.43
Two-party-preferred result
Labor	Kate Thwaites	55,304	56.57	+0.97
Liberal	Richard Welch	42,463	43.43	−0.97
Labor hold		Swing	+0.97	

=== Kooyong ===
2019 Australian federal election: Kooyong
Party	Candidate	Votes	%	±%
Liberal	Josh Frydenberg	48,928	49.41	−8.24
Greens	Julian Burnside	21,035	21.24	+2.65
Labor	Jana Stewart	16,666	16.83	−3.70
Independent	Oliver Yates	8,890	8.98	+8.98
United Australia	Steven D'Elia	1,185	1.20	+1.20
Animal Justice	Davina Hinkley	1,117	1.13	+1.00
Independent	Bill Chandler	669	0.68	+0.68
Independent	Angelina Zubac	539	0.54	−2.32
Total formal votes		99,029	97.03	−0.97
Informal votes		3,033	2.97	+0.97
Turnout		102,062	94.14	+0.48
Notional two-party-preferred count
Liberal	Josh Frydenberg	56,127	56.68	−6.14
Labor	Jana Stewart	42,902	43.32	+6.14
Two-candidate-preferred result
Liberal	Josh Frydenberg	55,159	55.70	−7.64
Greens	Julian Burnside	43,870	44.30	+44.30
Liberal hold		Swing	N/A	

=== La Trobe ===
2019 Australian federal election: La Trobe
Party	Candidate	Votes	%	±%
Liberal	Jason Wood	45,123	45.72	+1.59
Labor	Simon Curtis	34,040	34.49	+2.35
Greens	Amy Gregorovich	7,752	7.86	−0.43
One Nation	Esther Baker	4,796	4.86	+4.86
Justice	Asher Calwell-Browne	3,525	3.57	+0.70
United Australia	Duncan Dean	2,506	2.54	+2.54
Rise Up Australia	Norman Baker	947	0.96	−1.01
Total formal votes		98,689	95.53	+1.21
Informal votes		4,616	4.47	−1.21
Turnout		103,305	93.30	+5.19
Two-party-preferred result
Liberal	Jason Wood	53,776	54.49	+1.27
Labor	Simon Curtis	44,913	45.51	−1.27
Liberal hold		Swing	+1.27	

=== Lalor ===
2019 Australian federal election: Lalor
Party	Candidate	Votes	%	±%
Labor	Joanne Ryan	48,332	51.70	−0.86
Liberal	Gayle Murphy	28,209	30.18	−0.05
Greens	Jay Dessi	7,273	7.78	−1.83
United Australia	Jeffrey Robinson	4,451	4.76	+4.76
Australia First	Susan Jakobi	4,094	4.38	+1.28
	Aijaz Moinuddin	1,119	1.20	+1.20
Total formal votes		93,478	95.57	+0.12
Informal votes		4,337	4.43	−0.12
Turnout		97,815	91.60	+4.05
Two-party-preferred result
Labor	Joanne Ryan	58,341	62.41	−1.78
Liberal	Gayle Murphy	35,137	37.59	+1.78
Labor hold		Swing	−1.78	

=== Macnamara ===
2019 Australian federal election: Macnamara
Party	Candidate	Votes	%	±%
Liberal	Kate Ashmor	36,283	37.37	−4.60
Labor	Josh Burns	30,855	31.78	+5.24
Greens	Steph Hodgins-May	23,534	24.24	+0.08
Animal Justice	Craig McPherson	1,919	1.98	0.00
United Australia	Helen Paton	1,136	1.17	+1.17
Independent	Ruby O'Rourke	1,108	1.14	+1.14
Sustainable Australia	Steven Armstrong	974	1.00	+1.00
Independent	Chris Wallis	918	0.95	+0.95
Rise Up Australia	Christine Kay	365	0.38	+0.38
Total formal votes		97,092	95.77	0.00
Informal votes		4,288	4.23	0.00
Turnout		101,380	89.08	+2.80
Two-party-preferred result
Labor	Josh Burns	54,613	56.25	+5.04
Liberal	Kate Ashmor	42,479	43.75	−5.04
Labor notional hold		Swing	+5.04	

Macnamara was a new electorate, notionally held by Labor.

=== Mallee ===
2019 Australian federal election: Mallee
Party	Candidate	Votes	%	±%
National	Anne Webster	26,142	27.86	−28.06
Liberal	Serge Petrovich	17,665	18.83	+11.74
Labor	Carole Hart	14,722	15.69	−6.85
Independent	Jason Modica	8,795	9.37	+9.37
Independent	Ray Kingston	8,621	9.19	+9.19
Shooters, Fishers, Farmers	Dan Straub	5,512	5.87	+5.87
Greens	Nicole Rowan	3,297	3.51	−3.50
United Australia	Rick Millar	3,171	3.38	+3.38
Independent	Cecilia Moar	2,761	2.94	+2.94
Conservative National	Rick Grosvenor	1,309	1.40	+1.40
Rise Up Australia	Philip Mollison	919	0.98	−3.50
Science	Leigh Firman	497	0.53	+0.53
Citizens Electoral Council	Chris Lahy	416	0.44	−1.23
Total formal votes		93,827	88.84	−6.41
Informal votes		11,792	11.16	+6.41
Turnout		105,619	92.84	−1.48
Two-party-preferred result
National	Anne Webster	62,143	66.23	−3.57
Labor	Carole Hart	31,684	33.77	+3.57
National hold		Swing	−3.57	

=== Maribyrnong ===
2019 Australian federal election: Maribyrnong
Party	Candidate	Votes	%	±%
Labor	Bill Shorten	47,487	47.05	+4.99
Liberal	Christine Stow	34,877	34.56	+0.83
Greens	James Williams	14,943	14.81	−2.42
United Australia	MD Sarwar Hasan	3,617	3.58	+3.58
Total formal votes		100,924	97.10	+1.07
Informal votes		3,014	2.90	−1.07
Turnout		103,938	92.09	+2.72
Two-party-preferred result
Labor	Bill Shorten	61,767	61.20	+0.80
Liberal	Christine Stow	39,157	38.80	−0.80
Labor hold		Swing	+0.80	

=== McEwen ===
2019 Australian federal election: McEwen
Party	Candidate	Votes	%	±%
Labor	Rob Mitchell	37,911	39.44	−2.77
Liberal	Phillip Fusco	33,162	34.50	−1.32
Greens	Neil Barker	8,026	8.35	−0.24
One Nation	Ronnie Graham	5,693	5.92	+5.92
Justice	Deb Butler	3,878	4.03	+4.03
United Australia	Chris Hayman	3,016	3.14	+3.14
Animal Justice	Ruth Parramore	2,890	3.01	+0.17
Independent	Robert Hyndman	1,552	1.61	+1.61
Total formal votes		96,128	94.74	+0.31
Informal votes		5,334	5.26	−0.31
Turnout		101,462	93.91	+4.20
Two-party-preferred result
Labor	Rob Mitchell	52,892	55.02	−0.98
Liberal	Phillip Fusco	43,236	44.98	+0.98
Labor hold		Swing	−0.98	

=== Melbourne ===
2019 Australian federal election: Melbourne
Party	Candidate	Votes	%	±%
Greens	Adam Bandt	45,876	49.30	+4.70
Liberal	Lauren Sherson	19,979	21.47	−3.32
Labor	Luke Creasey	18,371	19.74	−4.22
Reason	Judy Ryan	4,756	5.11	+5.11
Animal Justice	Lawrence Pope	1,849	1.99	+0.18
Independent	Dave Blake	1,154	1.24	+1.24
United Australia	Tony Pecora	1,079	1.16	+1.16
Total formal votes		93,064	96.98	−0.52
Informal votes		2,896	3.02	+0.52
Turnout		95,960	89.21	+4.94
Notional two-party-preferred count
Labor	Luke Creasey	62,410	67.06	+0.06
Liberal	Lauren Sherson	30,654	32.94	−0.06
Two-candidate-preferred result
Greens	Adam Bandt	66,852	71.83	+2.79
Liberal	Lauren Sherson	26,212	28.17	−2.79
Greens hold		Swing	+2.79	

=== Menzies ===
2019 Australian federal election: Menzies
Party	Candidate	Votes	%	±%
Liberal	Kevin Andrews	50,863	51.73	+1.89
Labor	Stella Yee	29,539	30.04	+3.12
Greens	Robert Humphreys	10,264	10.44	+0.05
Democratic Labour	Teresa Kelleher	3,026	3.08	+3.08
United Australia	Brett Fuller	2,605	2.65	+2.65
Reason	Rachel Payne	2,029	2.06	+2.06
Total formal votes		98,326	96.68	+1.23
Informal votes		3,376	3.32	−1.23
Turnout		101,702	94.34	−0.91
Two-party-preferred result
Liberal	Kevin Andrews	56,568	57.53	−0.28
Labor	Stella Yee	41,758	42.47	+0.28
Liberal hold		Swing	−0.28	

=== Monash ===
2019 Australian federal election: Monash
Party	Candidate	Votes	%	±%
Liberal	Russell Broadbent	46,501	46.28	−3.58
Labor	Jessica O'Donnell	29,656	29.51	+1.75
One Nation	Jeff Waddell	7,656	7.62	+7.62
Greens	William Hornstra	7,047	7.01	−3.09
United Australia	Matthew Sherry	4,028	4.01	+4.01
Independent	Michael Fozard	2,870	2.86	+2.86
Independent	John Verhoeven	2,723	2.71	+2.71
Total formal votes		100,481	95.59	+0.88
Informal votes		4,636	4.41	−0.88
Turnout		105,117	93.45	+2.08
Two-party-preferred result
Liberal	Russell Broadbent	57,631	57.36	−0.15
Labor	Jessica O'Donnell	42,850	42.64	+0.15
Liberal notional hold		Swing	−0.15	

Monash was a new seat notionally held by the Liberal Party.

=== Nicholls ===
2019 Australian federal election: Nicholls
Party	Candidate	Votes	%	±%
National	Damian Drum	48,855	51.27	+18.58
Labor	Bill Lodwick	18,493	19.41	+2.32
One Nation	Rikkie-Lee Tyrrell	10,754	11.29	+11.29
United Australia	Stewart Hine	5,077	5.33	+5.33
Independent	Andrew Bock	4,581	4.81	+3.39
Greens	Nickee Freeman	4,011	4.21	−0.23
Independent	Jeremy Parker	1,772	1.86	+1.86
Independent	Nigel Hicks	1,749	1.84	+1.00
Total formal votes		95,292	92.54	+1.16
Informal votes		7,679	7.46	−1.16
Turnout		102,971	92.65	−0.80
Two-party-preferred result
National	Damian Drum	66,732	70.03	−2.49
Labor	Bill Lodwick	28,560	29.97	+2.49
National notional hold		Swing	−2.49	

Nicholls was a new seat, notionally held by the Nationals.

=== Scullin ===
2019 Australian federal election: Scullin
Party	Candidate	Votes	%	±%
Labor	Andrew Giles	55,467	60.42	+1.03
Liberal	Gurpal Singh	20,484	22.31	−3.54
Greens	Cynthia Smith	6,128	6.67	−0.55
United Australia	Firas Hasan	4,625	5.04	+5.04
Animal Justice	Rod Whitfield	3,500	3.81	+0.51
Independent	Yassin Akram Albarri	1,605	1.75	+1.75
Total formal votes		91,809	94.78	+0.60
Informal votes		5,055	5.22	−0.60
Turnout		96,864	92.12	+2.21
Two-party-preferred result
Labor	Andrew Giles	65,787	71.66	+2.08
Liberal	Gurpal Singh	26,022	28.34	−2.08
Labor hold		Swing	+2.08	

=== Wannon ===
2019 Australian federal election: Wannon
Party	Candidate	Votes	%	±%
Liberal	Dan Tehan	53,094	51.11	+0.69
Labor	Maurice Billi	27,150	26.13	−3.87
Independent	Alex Dyson	10,797	10.39	+10.39
Greens	Zephlyn Taylor	6,590	6.34	−1.86
United Australia	Joshua Wallace	6,258	6.02	+6.02
Total formal votes		103,889	96.15	+0.55
Informal votes		4,161	3.85	−0.55
Turnout		108,050	94.31	−1.18
Two-party-preferred result
Liberal	Dan Tehan	62,733	60.38	+1.23
Labor	Maurice Billi	41,156	39.62	−1.23
Liberal hold		Swing	+1.23	

=== Wills ===
2019 Australian federal election: Wills
Party	Candidate	Votes	%	±%
Labor	Peter Khalil	42,355	44.08	+6.17
Greens	Adam Pulford	25,575	26.62	−4.29
Liberal	Peter Killin	17,241	17.94	−3.60
Victorian Socialists	Sue Bolton	4,344	4.52	+4.52
Animal Justice	Chris Miles	3,596	3.74	+2.08
United Australia	Manju Venkat	2,979	3.10	+3.10
Total formal votes		96,090	95.77	+2.61
Informal votes		4,243	4.23	−2.61
Turnout		100,333	90.67	+3.25
Notional two-party-preferred count
Labor	Peter Khalil	72,888	75.85	+4.18
Liberal	Peter Killin	23,202	24.15	−4.18
Two-candidate-preferred result
Labor	Peter Khalil	55,898	58.17	+3.24
Greens	Adam Pulford	40,192	41.83	−3.24
Labor hold		Swing	+3.24	
