= Results of the 2022 Australian federal election in Victoria =

2022 Australian federal election (Victoria)
- 21 May 2022

All 39 Victorian seats in the Australian House of Representatives and 6 seats in the Australian Senate
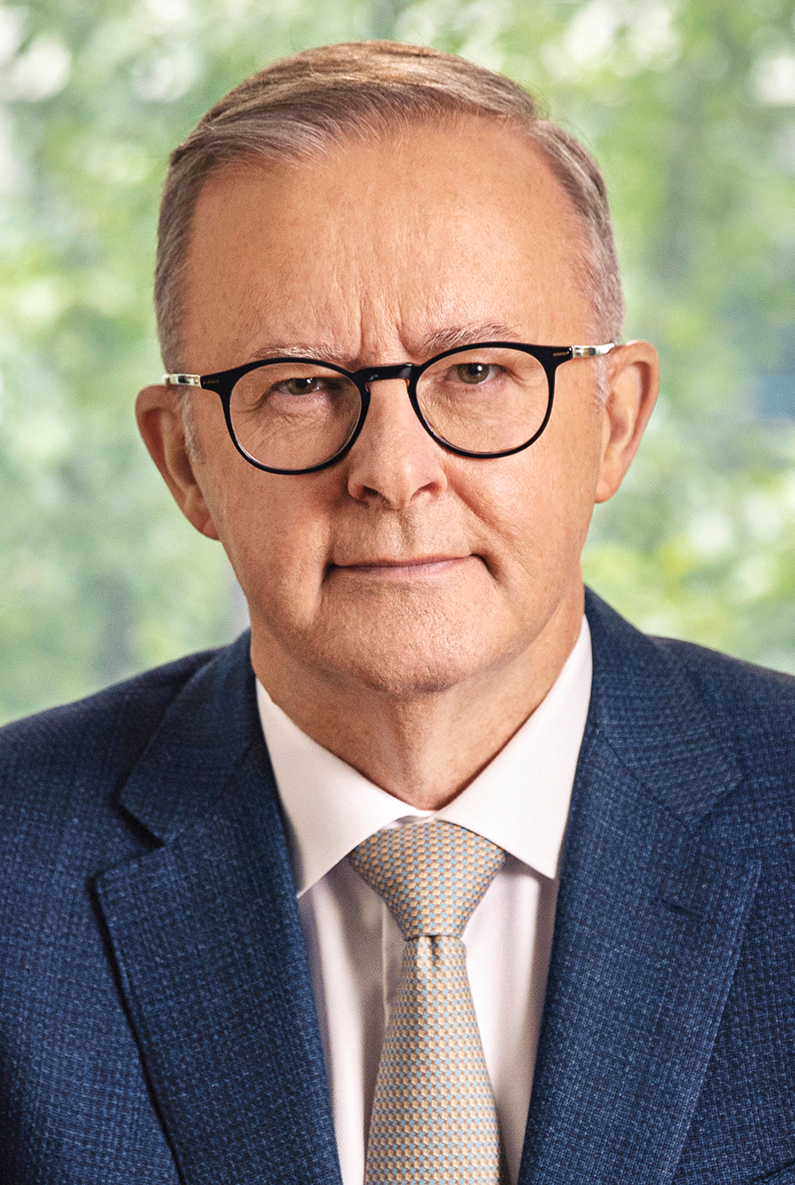

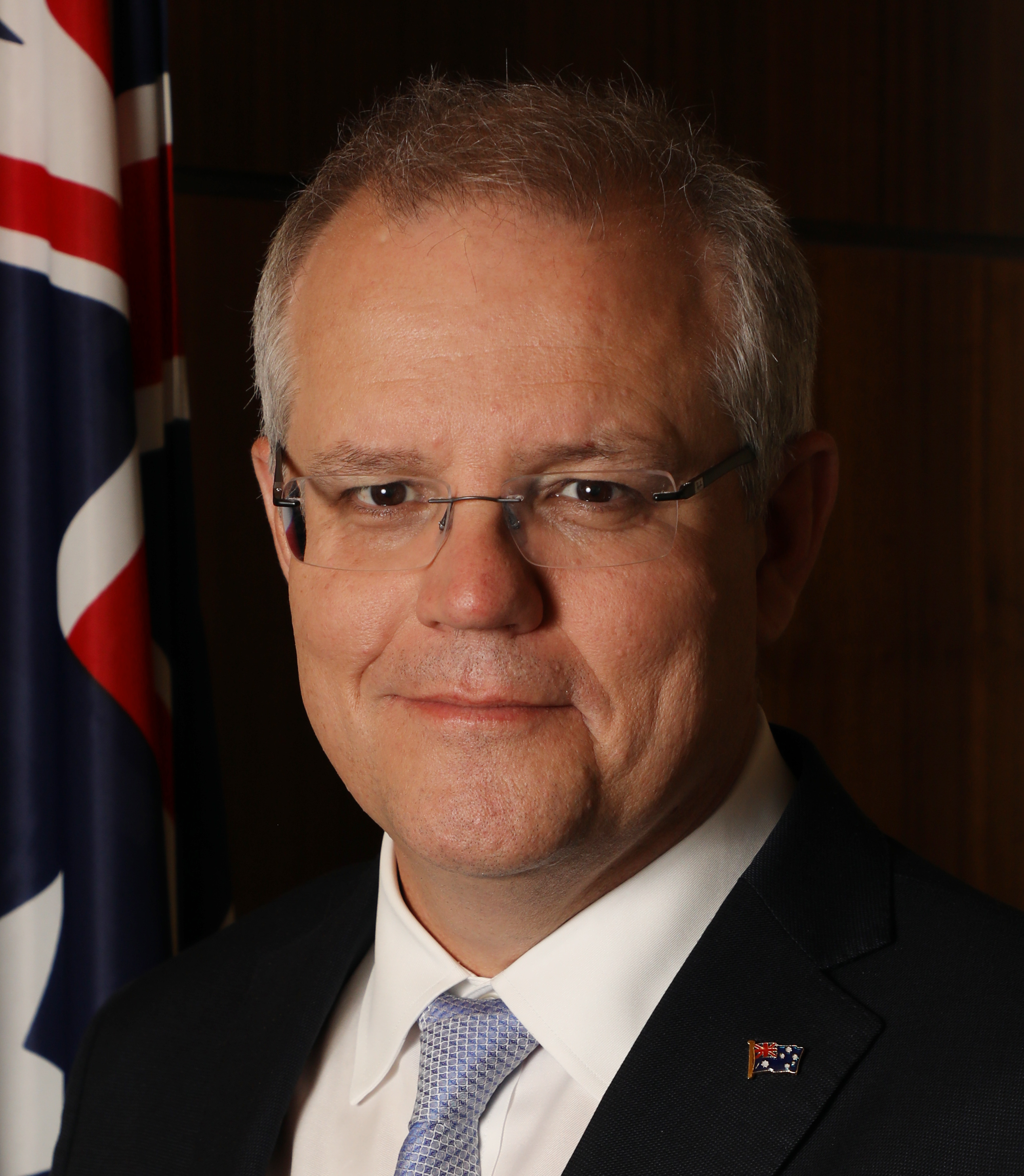

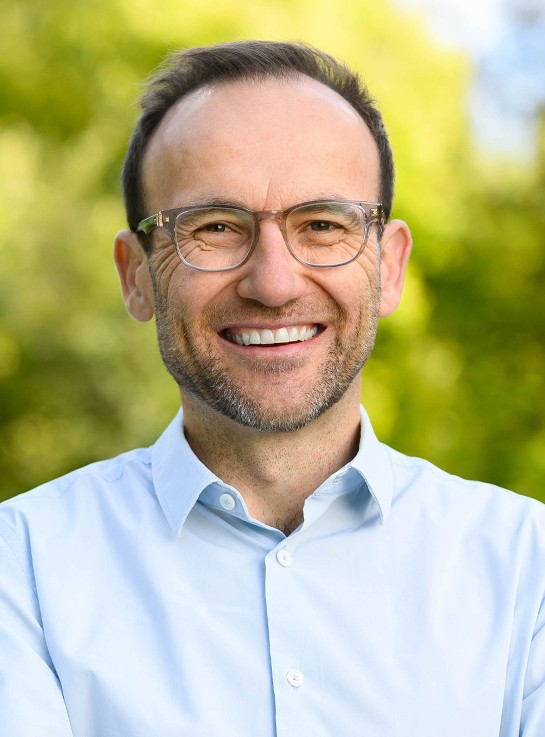
	First party	Second party	Third party
Leader	Anthony Albanese	Scott Morrison	Adam Bandt
Party	Labor	Liberal/National coalition	Greens
Last election	21 seats	15 seats	1 seat
Seats won	24	11	1
Seat change	▲3	▼4	Steady
Primary vote	1,230,842	1,239,280	514,893
Percentage	32.85%	33.08%	13.74%
Swing	▼4.01	▼5.18	▲1.85
TPP	54.83%	45.17%
TPP swing	▲1.69	▼1.69
- Results by division for the House of Representatives, shaded by winning party's margin of victory.

This is a list of electoral division results for the 2022 Australian federal election in the state of Victoria.

== Overall results ==
House of Representatives (IRV) – Turnout 90.59% (CV)
Party	Votes	%	Swing (pp)	Seats	Change (seats) (Note: Due to Victoria gaining an extra seat with the creation of the Division of Hawke, numbers of seats lost and gained do not add up.)
Liberal Party of Australia	1,105,718	29.51	−5.37	8	▼4
National Party of Australia	133,562	3.57	−0.13	3	0
Liberal/National Coalition	1,239,280	33.08	−5.18	11	▼4
Australian Labor Party	1,230,842	32.85	−4.01	24	▲3
Australian Greens	514,893	13.74	+1.85	1	Steady
United Australia Party	177,745	4.74	+1.10	0	Steady
Pauline Hanson's One Nation	143,558	3.83	+2.88	0	Steady
Liberal Democratic Party	94,626	2.53	+2.53	0	Steady
Animal Justice Party	28,205	0.75	−0.37	0	Steady
Victorian Socialists	27,226	0.73	+0.39	0	Steady
Australian Federation Party	20,439	0.55	+0.55	0	Steady
Derryn Hinch's Justice Party	6,494	0.17	−0.56	0	Steady
Socialist Alliance	5,540	0.15	+0.15	0	Steady
The Great Australian Party	4,880	0.13	+0.06	0	Steady
TNL	2,405	0.06	+0.06	0	Steady
Fusion	2,238	0.06	+0.06	0	Steady
Australian Citizens Party	2,017	0.05	−0.04	0	Steady
Reason Party	1,458	0.04	−0.20	0	Steady
Sustainable Australia	443	0.01	−0.17	0	Steady
Australian Values Party	152	0.00	+0.00	0	Steady
Independent	243,992	6.51	+2.59	3	▲2
Total	3,746,433	100.00		39	▲1
Invalid/blank votes	185,174	4.71	+0.05	–	–
Turnout	3,931,607	90.59	−2.03	–	–
Registered voters	4,339,960	–	–	–	–
Two-party-preferred vote
Labor	2,054,061	54.83	+1.69		
Liberal/National Coalition	1,692,372	45.17	−1.69		
Source: AEC for both votes and seats

== Results by division ==
=== Aston ===
2022 Australian federal election: Aston
Party	Candidate	Votes	%	±%
Liberal	Alan Tudge	42,260	43.05	−11.64
Labor	Mary Doyle	31,949	32.55	+2.74
Greens	Asher Cookson	11,855	12.08	+3.22
United Australia	Rebekah Spelman	5,990	6.10	+2.49
One Nation	Craig Ibbotson	3,022	3.08	+3.08
Liberal Democrats	Liam Roche	2,111	2.15	+2.15
TNL	Ryan Bruce	973	0.99	+0.99
Total formal votes		98,160	96.73	+0.41
Informal votes		3,320	3.27	−0.41
Turnout		101,480	92.50	−1.79
Two-party-preferred result
Liberal	Alan Tudge	51,840	52.81	−7.32
Labor	Mary Doyle	46,320	47.19	+7.32
Liberal hold		Swing	−7.32	

Alluvial diagram for preference flows in the seat of Aston in the 2022 federal election. indicates at what stage the winning candidate had over 50% of the votes and was declared the winner.

=== Ballarat ===
2022 Australian federal election: Ballarat
Party	Candidate	Votes	%	±%
Labor	Catherine King	43,171	44.74	−2.15
Liberal	Ben Green	26,142	27.09	−4.57
Greens	John Barnes	14,076	14.59	+5.61
United Australia	Terri Pryse-Smith	3,693	3.83	−0.77
One Nation	Rosalie Taxis	3,476	3.60	+3.60
Liberal Democrats	Julia McGrath	3,216	3.33	+3.33
Independent	Alex Graham	2,044	2.12	+0.85
Federation	Kerryn Sedgman	682	0.71	+0.71
Total formal votes		96,500	94.97	−0.83
Informal votes		5,109	5.03	+0.83
Turnout		101,609	91.90	−1.92
Two-party-preferred result
Labor	Catherine King	60,770	62.97	+2.74
Liberal	Ben Green	35,730	37.03	−2.74
Labor hold		Swing	+2.74	

Alluvial diagram for preference flows in the seat of Ballarat in the 2022 federal election. indicates at what stage the winning candidate had over 50% of the votes and was declared the winner.

=== Bendigo ===
2022 Australian federal election: Bendigo
Party	Candidate	Votes	%	±%
Labor	Lisa Chesters	42,883	42.98	−0.63
Liberal	Darin Schade	26,576	26.63	−5.15
Greens	Cate Sinclair	14,026	14.06	+3.15
One Nation	Ben Mihail	5,508	5.52	−0.72
Independent	James Laurie	4,319	4.33	+4.33
United Australia	Elijah Suares	3,579	3.59	−0.74
Liberal Democrats	Matt Bansemer	2,888	2.89	+2.89
Total formal votes		99,779	96.36	+0.46
Informal votes		3,764	3.64	−0.46
Turnout		103,543	92.16	−2.15
Two-party-preferred result
Labor	Lisa Chesters	61,968	62.11	+3.26
Liberal	Darin Schade	37,811	37.89	−3.26
Labor hold		Swing	+3.26	

Alluvial diagram for preference flows in the seat of Bendigo in the 2022 federal election. indicates at what stage the winning candidate had over 50% of the votes and was declared the winner.

=== Bruce ===
2022 Australian federal election: Bruce
Party	Candidate	Votes	%	±%
Labor	Julian Hill	39,516	41.47	−6.57
Liberal	James Moody	28,837	30.26	−5.43
Greens	Matthew Kirwan	9,273	9.73	+2.10
United Australia	Matt Babet	8,299	8.71	+4.61
Liberal Democrats	Christine Skrobo	4,821	5.06	+5.06
One Nation	Hayley Deans	4,544	4.77	+3.75
Total formal votes		95,290	95.66	+0.76
Informal votes		4,321	4.34	−0.76
Turnout		99,611	88.34	−3.67
Two-party-preferred result
Labor	Julian Hill	53,920	56.59	−0.69
Liberal	James Moody	41,370	43.41	+0.69
Labor hold		Swing	−0.69	

Alluvial diagram for preference flows in the seat of Bruce in the 2022 federal election. indicates at what stage the winning candidate had over 50% of the votes and was declared the winner.

=== Calwell ===
2022 Australian federal election: Calwell
Party	Candidate	Votes	%	±%
Labor	Maria Vamvakinou	38,127	44.86	−9.57
Liberal	Tim Staker-Gunn	20,111	23.66	−0.63
Greens	Natalie Abboud	8,277	9.74	+3.01
United Australia	Joshua Naim	7,578	8.92	+5.45
One Nation	Mark Preston	5,957	7.01	+7.01
Victorian Socialists	Jerome Small	3,433	4.04	−0.74
Federation	Maria Bengtsson	1,512	1.78	+1.78
Total formal votes		84,995	93.69	+3.03
Informal votes		5,724	6.31	−3.03
Turnout		90,719	85.02	−1.04
Two-party-preferred result
Labor	Maria Vamvakinou	53,032	62.39	−7.23
Liberal	Tim Staker-Gunn	31,963	37.61	+7.23
Labor hold		Swing	−7.23	

Alluvial diagram for preference flows in the seat of Calwell in the 2022 federal election. indicates at what stage the winning candidate had over 50% of the votes and was declared the winner.

=== Casey ===
2022 Australian federal election: Casey
Party	Candidate	Votes	%	±%
Liberal	Aaron Violi	36,347	36.49	−8.74
Labor	Bill Brindle	24,779	24.87	−3.78
Greens	Jenny Game	12,894	12.94	+1.99
Independent	Claire Ferres Miles	8,307	8.34	+8.34
United Australia	Anthony Bellve	4,834	4.85	+2.24
Independent Australia One	Craig Cole	3,455	3.47	+3.47
One Nation	Paul Murphy	3,260	3.27	+3.23
Liberal Democrats	Trevor Smith	2,008	2.02	+2.02
Animal Justice	Andrew Klop	1,844	1.85	−1.23
Justice	Peter Sullivan	1,207	1.21	−2.11
Federation	Chris Field	686	0.69	+0.69
Total formal votes		99,621	93.74	+0.18
Informal votes		6,652	6.26	−0.18
Turnout		106,273	93.00	−2.52
Two-party-preferred result
Liberal	Aaron Violi	51,283	51.48	−3.14
Labor	Bill Brindle	48,338	48.52	+3.14
Liberal hold		Swing	−3.14	

Alluvial diagram for preference flows in the seat of Casey in the 2022 federal election. indicates at what stage the winning candidate had over 50% of the votes and was declared the winner.

=== Chisholm ===
2022 Australian federal election: Chisholm
Party	Candidate	Votes	%	±%
Labor	Carina Garland	38,692	40.09	+3.77
Liberal	Gladys Liu	35,038	36.30	−7.70
Greens	Sarah Newman	12,130	12.57	+1.94
United Australia	Melanie Kempson	2,295	2.38	+0.22
Liberal Democrats	Ethelyn King	1,620	1.68	+1.68
Independent	Dominique Murphy	1,590	1.65	+1.65
One Nation	Aaron Tyrrell	1,377	1.43	+1.43
Animal Justice	Rod Whitfield	1,122	1.16	−0.09
Justice	Thomas Stanfield	946	0.98	−0.45
Independent	Wayne Tseng	757	0.78	+0.78
Federation	Anthea Antonie	567	0.59	+0.59
Citizens	Ryan Dare	384	0.40	+0.40
Total formal votes		96,518	95.30	−0.44
Informal votes		4,763	4.70	+0.44
Turnout		101,281	92.20	−2.61
Two-party-preferred result
Labor	Carina Garland	54,448	56.41	+6.86
Liberal	Gladys Liu	42,070	43.59	−6.86
Labor gain from Liberal		Swing	+6.86	

Alluvial diagram for preference flows in the seat of Chisholm in the 2022 federal election. indicates at what stage the winning candidate had over 50% of the votes and was declared the winner.

=== Cooper ===
2022 Australian federal election: Cooper
Party	Candidate	Votes	%	±%
Labor	Ged Kearney	38,754	41.34	−5.52
Greens	Celeste Liddle	25,648	27.36	+6.43
Liberal	Jadon Atkinson	15,329	16.35	−3.25
United Australia	Adam La Rosa	4,170	4.45	+2.48
Victorian Socialists	Kath Larkin	3,250	3.47	−0.75
One Nation	William Turner	2,807	2.99	+2.99
Animal Justice	Rabin Bangaar	2,207	2.35	−0.20
Fusion	Adrian Whitehead	1,585	1.69	+1.69
Total formal votes		93,750	95.74	+0.66
Informal votes		4,169	4.26	−0.66
Turnout		97,919	90.16	−2.18
Notional two-party-preferred count
Labor	Ged Kearney	70,743	75.46	−0.75
Liberal	Jadon Atkinson	23,007	24.54	+0.75
Two-candidate-preferred result
Labor	Ged Kearney	55,006	58.67	−6.16
Greens	Celeste Liddle	38,744	41.33	+6.16
Labor hold		Swing	−6.16	

Alluvial diagram for preference flows in the seat of Cooper in the 2022 federal election. indicates at what stage the winning candidate had over 50% of the votes and was declared the winner.

=== Corangamite ===
2022 Australian federal election: Corangamite
Party	Candidate	Votes	%	±%
Labor	Libby Coker	38,573	38.20	+2.41
Liberal	Stephanie Asher	34,463	34.13	−8.26
Greens	Alex Marshall	15,349	15.20	+6.49
United Australia	Daniel Abou-Zeid	3,233	3.20	+1.02
One Nation	Luke Sorensen	2,548	2.52	+2.52
Liberal Democrats	Paul Barker	2,526	2.50	+2.50
Animal Justice	Meg Watkins	1,986	1.97	−0.17
Justice	Jean-Marie D'Argent	1,421	1.41	−1.22
Federation	Stephen Juhasz	868	0.86	+0.86
Total formal votes		100,967	96.11	+0.06
Informal votes		4,088	3.89	−0.06
Turnout		105,055	93.26	+1.01
Two-party-preferred result
Labor	Libby Coker	58,160	57.60	+6.55
Liberal	Stephanie Asher	42,807	42.40	−6.55
Labor hold		Swing	+6.55	

Alluvial diagram for preference flows in the seat of Corangamite in the 2022 federal election. indicates at what stage the winning candidate had over 50% of the votes and was declared the winner.

=== Corio ===
2022 Australian federal election: Corio
Party	Candidate	Votes	%	±%
Labor	Richard Marles	40,846	42.13	−5.47
Liberal	Manish Patel	23,822	24.57	−9.28
Greens	Simon Northeast	14,450	14.91	+1.84
United Australia	Shane Murdock	4,781	4.93	−0.55
One Nation	Robert Jones	3,788	3.91	+3.91
Liberal Democrats	Max Payne	3,383	3.49	+3.49
Socialist Alliance	Sue Bull	2,444	2.52	+2.52
Animal Justice	Naomi Adams	2,350	2.42	+2.42
Federation	Jessica Taylor	1,080	1.11	+1.11
Total formal votes		96,944	94.78	−1.66
Informal votes		5,341	5.22	+1.66
Turnout		102,285	90.91	−2.97
Two-party-preferred result
Labor	Richard Marles	60,919	62.84	+2.52
Liberal	Manish Patel	36,025	37.16	−2.52
Labor hold		Swing	+2.52	

Alluvial diagram for preference flows in the seat of Corio in the 2022 federal election. indicates at what stage the winning candidate had over 50% of the votes and was declared the winner.

=== Deakin ===
2022 Australian federal election: Deakin
Party	Candidate	Votes	%	±%
Liberal	Michael Sukkar	41,626	41.51	−6.21
Labor	Matt Gregg	32,844	32.76	+0.40
Greens	Rob Humphreys	13,904	13.87	+4.58
United Australia	Bianca Gidley	2,836	2.83	+0.76
One Nation	Natasha Coughlan	2,306	2.30	+2.30
Liberal Democrats	Harrison Carr	1,843	1.84	+1.84
Animal Justice	Katherine Dolheguy	1,650	1.65	−0.31
Independent	Qian Liu	1,271	1.27	+1.27
Justice	Judith Thompson	1,080	1.08	−2.23
Federation	Samantha Bastin	909	0.91	+0.91
Total formal votes		100,269	95.78	−0.15
Informal votes		4,419	4.22	+0.15
Turnout		104,688	93.09	−2.08
Two-party-preferred result
Liberal	Michael Sukkar	50,322	50.19	−4.50
Labor	Matt Gregg	49,947	49.81	+4.50
Liberal hold		Swing	−4.50	

Alluvial diagram for preference flows in the seat of Deakin in the 2022 federal election. indicates at what stage the winning candidate had over 50% of the votes and was declared the winner.

=== Dunkley ===
2022 Australian federal election: Dunkley
Party	Candidate	Votes	%	±%
Labor	Peta Murphy	38,506	40.23	+1.71
Liberal	Sharn Coombes	31,108	32.50	−7.38
Greens	Liam O'Brien	9,898	10.34	+1.95
United Australia	Adrian Irvine	4,846	5.06	+2.46
Independent	Darren Bergwerf	3,698	3.86	+3.86
One Nation	Scott Middlebrook	2,689	2.81	+2.81
Liberal Democrats	Damian Willis	2,398	2.51	+2.51
Animal Justice	Elizabeth Johnston	2,013	2.10	−0.96
Federation	Kathryn Woods	566	0.59	+0.59
Total formal votes		95,722	95.27	+0.41
Informal votes		4,750	4.73	−0.41
Turnout		100,472	90.06	−2.30
Two-party-preferred result
Labor	Peta Murphy	53,865	56.27	+3.53
Liberal	Sharn Coombes	41,857	43.73	−3.53
Labor hold		Swing	+3.53	

Alluvial diagram for preference flows in the seat of Dunkley in the 2022 federal election. indicates at what stage the winning candidate had over 50% of the votes and was declared the winner.

=== Flinders ===
2022 Australian federal election: Flinders
Party	Candidate	Votes	%	±%
Liberal	Zoe McKenzie	43,013	43.49	−3.23
Labor	Surbhi Snowball	21,487	21.73	−3.01
Greens	Colin Lane	9,293	9.40	+2.59
Independent	Despi O'Connor	7,163	7.24	+7.24
Independent	Sarah Russell	5,189	5.25	+5.25
United Australia	Alex van der End	4,472	4.52	+2.00
One Nation	Cyndi Marr	3,373	3.41	+3.41
Liberal Democrats	Chrysten Abraham	2,366	2.39	+2.39
Animal Justice	Pamela Engelander	2,060	2.08	−0.30
Federation	Jefferson Earl	486	0.49	+0.49
Total formal votes		98,902	94.56	+0.50
Informal votes		5,687	5.44	−0.50
Turnout		104,589	91.41	−1.82
Two-party-preferred result
Liberal	Zoe McKenzie	56,075	56.70	+1.06
Labor	Surbhi Snowball	42,827	43.30	−1.06
Liberal hold		Swing	+1.06	

Alluvial diagram for preference flows in the seat of Flinders in the 2022 federal election. indicates at what stage the winning candidate had over 50% of the votes and was declared the winner.

=== Fraser ===
2022 Australian federal election: Fraser
Party	Candidate	Votes	%	±%
Labor	Daniel Mulino	38,732	42.05	−8.73
Liberal	David Wood	22,730	24.68	+0.73
Greens	Bella Mitchell-Sears	17,078	18.54	+4.66
Victorian Socialists	Catherine Robertson	4,429	4.81	+4.81
United Australia	Keith Raymond	4,088	4.44	−2.05
One Nation	Sabine de Pyle	2,695	2.93	+2.93
Liberal Democrats	Anthony Cursio	2,349	2.55	+2.55
Total formal votes		92,101	95.58	+0.39
Informal votes		4,258	4.42	−0.39
Turnout		96,359	86.84	−3.26
Two-party-preferred result
Labor	Daniel Mulino	61,251	66.50	−1.55
Liberal	David Wood	30,850	33.50	+1.55
Labor hold		Swing	−1.55	

Alluvial diagram for preference flows in the seat of Fraser in the 2022 federal election. indicates at what stage the winning candidate had over 50% of the votes and was declared the winner.

=== Gellibrand ===
2022 Australian federal election: Gellibrand
Party	Candidate	Votes	%	±%
Labor	Tim Watts	39,382	42.72	−6.30
Liberal	Monica Clark	24,869	26.97	−3.80
Greens	Suzette Rodoreda	15,241	16.53	+2.67
United Australia	Abraham Isac	5,080	5.51	−0.14
One Nation	Rob Braddock	2,802	3.04	+3.04
Liberal Democrats	Chloe Glasson	2,185	2.37	+2.37
Victorian Socialists	Andrew Charles	1,503	1.63	+1.63
Federation	Sharynn Moors	1,135	1.23	+1.23
Total formal votes		92,197	95.12	−1.25
Informal votes		4,729	4.88	+1.25
Turnout		96,926	89.67	−1.22
Two-party-preferred result
Labor	Tim Watts	56,738	61.54	−1.48
Liberal	Monica Clark	35,459	38.46	+1.48
Labor hold		Swing	−1.48	

Alluvial diagram for preference flows in the seat of Gellibrand in the 2022 federal election. indicates at what stage the winning candidate had over 50% of the votes and was declared the winner.

=== Gippsland ===
2022 Australian federal election: Gippsland
Party	Candidate	Votes	%	±%
National	Darren Chester	54,635	54.14	+0.14
Labor	Jannette Langley	19,404	19.23	−3.97
One Nation	Greg Hansford	9,443	9.36	+9.36
Greens	Marjorie Thorpe	8,545	8.47	+2.43
United Australia	Gregory Forster	4,593	4.55	+0.15
Liberal Democrats	Jim McDonald	4,286	4.25	+4.25
Total formal votes		100,906	97.04	+2.26
Informal votes		3,073	2.96	−2.26
Turnout		103,979	90.89	−1.49
Two-party-preferred result
National	Darren Chester	71,205	70.57	+3.90
Labor	Jannette Langley	29,701	29.43	−3.90
National hold		Swing	+3.90	

Alluvial diagram for preference flows in the seat of Gippsland in the 2022 federal election. The winning candidate got over 50% of first preference votes, so this alluvial diagram is indicative only, and preference flows were not used to determine the final result. The preference flows were used to determine the two-candidate-preferred.

=== Goldstein ===
2022 Australian federal election: Goldstein
Party	Candidate	Votes	%	±%
Liberal	Tim Wilson	39,607	40.38	−12.29
Independent	Zoe Daniel	33,815	34.47	+34.47
Labor	Martyn Abbott	10,799	11.01	−17.30
Greens	Alana Galli-McRostie	7,683	7.83	−6.21
Liberal Democrats	David Segal	2,072	2.11	+2.11
United Australia	Catherine Reynolds	1,840	1.88	−0.08
One Nation	Lisa Stark	1,239	1.26	+1.26
Justice	Ellie Sullivan	589	0.60	+0.60
Sustainable Australia	Brandon Hoult	443	0.45	−1.21
Total formal votes		98,087	96.57	−1.22
Informal votes		3,487	3.43	+1.22
Turnout		101,574	92.65	−1.07
Notional two-party-preferred count
Liberal	Tim Wilson	53,750	54.80	−2.99
Labor	Martyn Abbott	44,337	45.20	+2.99
Two-candidate-preferred result
Independent	Zoe Daniel	51,861	52.87	+52.87
Liberal	Tim Wilson	46,226	47.13	−10.66
Independent gain from Liberal				

Alluvial diagram for preference flows in the seat of Goldstein in the 2022 federal election. indicates at what stage the winning candidate had over 50% of the votes and was declared the winner.

=== Gorton ===
2022 Australian federal election: Gorton
Party	Candidate	Votes	%	±%
Labor	Brendan O'Connor	38,178	41.30	−10.13
Liberal	John Fletcher	25,350	27.42	−0.56
Greens	Praise Morris	8,325	9.01	+1.58
United Australia	Michael Virag	7,082	7.66	+0.36
One Nation	Daniel Connor	6,719	7.27	+7.27
Independent	Steven Loncar	2,341	2.53	+2.53
Victorian Socialists	Belle Gibson	2,064	2.23	+2.23
Great Australian	Tony Dobran	1,312	1.42	+0.64
Federation	Paul Lassig	1,063	1.15	+1.15
Total formal votes		92,434	92.88	−1.04
Informal votes		7,089	7.12	+1.04
Turnout		99,523	89.77	−1.24
Two-party-preferred result
Labor	Brendan O'Connor	55,434	59.97	−4.27
Liberal	John Fletcher	37,000	40.03	+4.27
Labor hold		Swing	−4.27	

Alluvial diagram for preference flows in the seat of Gorton in the 2022 federal election. indicates at what stage the winning candidate had over 50% of the votes and was declared the winner.

=== Hawke ===
2022 Australian federal election: Hawke
Party	Candidate	Votes	%	±%
Labor	Sam Rae	32,020	36.73	−7.44
Liberal	Enamul Haque	22,960	26.34	−3.01
Greens	Lynda Wheelock	7,785	8.93	+1.56
Independent	Jarrod Bingham	6,908	7.92	+1.50
United Australia	Andrew Cuthbertson	6,131	7.03	+0.71
One Nation	Nick Suduk	4,872	5.59	+3.88
Federation	Michael Williams	1,926	2.21	+2.21
Great Australian	Michael Lacey	1,827	2.10	+2.10
TNL	Max Martucci	1,432	1.64	+1.64
Victorian Socialists	Jack Hynes	889	1.02	+1.02
Citizens	Glenn Vessey	434	0.50	+0.50
Total formal votes		87,184	91.85	−2.61
Informal votes		7,735	8.15	+2.61
Turnout		94,919	89.14	−0.81
Two-party-preferred result
Labor	Sam Rae	50,241	57.63	−2.59
Liberal	Enamul Haque	36,943	42.37	+2.59
Labor hold		Swing	−2.59	

Alluvial diagram for preference flows in the seat of Hawke in the 2022 federal election. indicates at what stage the winning candidate had over 50% of the votes and was declared the winner.

=== Higgins ===
2022 Australian federal election: Higgins
Party	Candidate	Votes	%	±%
Liberal	Katie Allen	38,859	40.69	−5.84
Labor	Michelle Ananda-Rajah	27,187	28.46	+2.39
Greens	Sonya Semmens	21,632	22.65	−0.06
Liberal Democrats	Matthew Ford	2,648	2.77	+2.77
United Australia	Ingram Spencer	1,917	2.01	+0.84
Reason	Andrew Johnson	1,458	1.53	+1.53
Animal Justice	Alicia Walker	1,295	1.36	−0.40
Federation	Suzie Menoudakis	515	0.54	+0.54
Total formal votes		95,511	97.18	−0.31
Informal votes		2,774	2.82	+0.31
Turnout		98,285	91.23	−2.45
Two-party-preferred result
Labor	Michelle Ananda-Rajah	49,726	52.06	+4.67
Liberal	Katie Allen	45,785	47.94	−4.67
Labor gain from Liberal		Swing	+4.67	

Alluvial diagram for preference flows in the seat of Higgins in the 2022 federal election. indicates at what stage the winning candidate had over 50% of the votes and was declared the winner.

=== Holt ===
2022 Australian federal election: Holt
Party	Candidate	Votes	%	±%
Labor	Cassandra Fernando	36,326	40.86	−9.68
Liberal	Ranj Perera	26,274	29.56	−6.21
United Australia	Gerardine Hansen	8,592	9.67	+3.52
Greens	Sujit Mathew	7,583	8.53	+1.37
One Nation	Sandy Ambard	4,295	4.83	+4.70
Independent	Ravi Ragupathy	2,673	3.01	+3.01
Liberal Democrats	Matthew Nunez-Silva	2,423	2.73	+2.73
Federation	Gregory Saldana	730	0.82	+0.82
Total formal votes		88,896	93.45	−2.38
Informal votes		6,227	6.55	+2.38
Turnout		95,123	88.57	−0.94
Two-party-preferred result
Labor	Cassandra Fernando	50,777	57.12	−1.51
Liberal	Ranj Perera	38,119	42.88	+1.51
Labor hold		Swing	−1.51	

Alluvial diagram for preference flows in the seat of Holt in the 2022 federal election. indicates at what stage the winning candidate had over 50% of the votes and was declared the winner.

=== Hotham ===
2022 Australian federal election: Hotham
Party	Candidate	Votes	%	±%
Labor	Clare O'Neil	47,135	47.04	−3.72
Liberal	Savitri Bevinakoppa	25,273	25.22	−8.15
Greens	Louisa Willoughby	12,408	12.38	+3.44
Liberal Democrats	Edward Sok	6,591	6.58	+6.58
United Australia	Bruce Ridgway	5,869	5.86	+2.17
One Nation	Roger Tull	2,926	2.92	+2.92
Total formal votes		100,202	96.45	+0.85
Informal votes		3,688	3.55	−0.85
Turnout		103,890	89.58	−2.81
Two-party-preferred result
Labor	Clare O'Neil	64,382	64.25	+3.07
Liberal	Savitri Bevinakoppa	35,820	35.75	−3.07
Labor hold		Swing	+3.07	

Alluvial diagram for preference flows in the seat of Hotham in the 2022 federal election. indicates at what stage the winning candidate had over 50% of the votes and was declared the winner.

=== Indi ===
2022 Australian federal election: Indi
Party	Candidate	Votes	%	±%
Independent	Helen Haines	41,319	40.68	+8.33
Liberal	Ross Lyman	30,995	30.52	−4.57
Labor	Nadia David	8,723	8.59	−3.50
One Nation	Beth Stevens	5,366	5.28	+5.28
National	Liz Fisher	3,854	3.79	−5.66
Greens	Benjamin Gilbert	3,626	3.57	−0.64
United Australia	Stephen Williams	2,558	2.52	−1.42
Liberal Democrats	Julian Fidge	2,300	2.26	+2.26
Animal Justice	Angel Aleksov	1,749	1.72	+1.72
Justice	Lachlan O'Connell	1,074	1.06	−1.80
Total formal votes		101,564	94.53	−1.11
Informal votes		5,880	5.47	+1.11
Turnout		107,444	91.48	−2.88
Notional two-party-preferred count
Liberal	Ross Lyman	56,123	55.26	−7.47
Labor	Nadia David	45,441	44.74	+7.47
Two-candidate-preferred result
Independent	Helen Haines	59,861	58.94	+7.55
Liberal	Ross Lyman	41,703	41.06	−7.55
Independent hold		Swing	+7.55	

Alluvial diagram for preference flows in the seat of Indi in the 2022 federal election. indicates at what stage the winning candidate had over 50% of the votes and was declared the winner.

=== Isaacs ===
2022 Australian federal election: Isaacs
Party	Candidate	Votes	%	±%
Labor	Mark Dreyfus	39,228	39.95	−4.95
Liberal	Robbie Beaton	31,306	31.89	−3.36
Greens	Alex Breskin	12,621	12.85	+1.78
United Australia	Scott McCamish	4,855	4.94	+0.95
Liberal Democrats	Sarah O'Donnell	4,785	4.87	+4.87
One Nation	Boris Sokiransky	3,130	3.19	+3.19
Animal Justice	Alix Livingstone	2,259	2.30	−1.30
Total formal votes		98,184	96.67	+0.80
Informal votes		3,382	3.33	−0.80
Turnout		101,566	91.77	−1.73
Two-party-preferred result
Labor	Mark Dreyfus	55,818	56.85	+0.39
Liberal	Robbie Beaton	42,366	43.15	−0.39
Labor hold		Swing	+0.39	

Alluvial diagram for preference flows in the seat of Isaacs in the 2022 federal election. indicates at what stage the winning candidate had over 50% of the votes and was declared the winner.

=== Jagajaga ===
2022 Australian federal election: Jagajaga
Party	Candidate	Votes	%	±%
Labor	Kate Thwaites	41,412	40.90	+0.00
Liberal	Sahil Tomar	29,535	29.17	−10.04
Greens	Liz Chase	16,855	16.65	+2.26
Liberal Democrats	Maya Tesa	3,760	3.71	+3.71
United Australia	Allison Zelinka	3,493	3.45	−0.04
Independent	Zahra Mustaf	3,150	3.11	+3.11
One Nation	John Booker	2,274	2.25	+2.25
Federation	Brendan Palmarini	764	0.75	+0.75
Total formal votes		101,243	96.20	−0.74
Informal votes		4,003	3.80	+0.74
Turnout		105,246	93.00	−2.26
Two-party-preferred result
Labor	Kate Thwaites	63,122	62.35	+6.46
Liberal	Sahil Tomar	38,121	37.65	−6.46
Labor hold		Swing	+6.46	

Alluvial diagram for preference flows in the seat of Jagajaga in the 2022 federal election. indicates at what stage the winning candidate had over 50% of the votes and was declared the winner.

=== Kooyong ===
2022 Australian federal election: Kooyong
Party	Candidate	Votes	%	±%
Liberal	Josh Frydenberg	43,736	42.66	−6.51
Independent	Monique Ryan	41,303	40.29	+40.29
Labor	Peter Lynch	7,091	6.92	−10.60
Greens	Piers Mitchem	6,461	6.30	−14.78
Liberal Democrats	Alexandra Thom	1,080	1.05	+1.05
United Australia	Scott Hardiman	1,011	0.99	−0.22
One Nation	Josh Coyne	741	0.72	+0.72
Animal Justice	Rachael Nehmer	500	0.49	−0.65
Independent	Will Anderson	265	0.26	+0.26
Justice	Michele Dale	177	0.17	+0.12
Australian Values	David Connolly	152	0.15	+0.15
Total formal votes		102,517	97.11	+0.08
Informal votes		3,046	2.89	−0.08
Turnout		105,563	93.44	−2.39
Notional two-party-preferred count
Liberal	Josh Frydenberg	55,542	54.18	−2.21
Labor	Peter Lynch	46,975	45.82	+2.21
Two-candidate-preferred result
Independent	Monique Ryan	54,276	52.94	+52.94
Liberal	Josh Frydenberg	48,241	47.06	−8.36
Independent gain from Liberal				

Alluvial diagram for preference flows in the seat of Kooyong in the 2022 federal election. indicates at what stage the winning candidate had over 50% of the votes and was declared the winner.

=== Lalor ===
2022 Australian federal election: Lalor
Party	Candidate	Votes	%	±%
Labor	Joanne Ryan	39,047	44.11	−7.47
Liberal	Ravi Gaddipati	22,083	24.95	−5.13
Greens	Jack Boddeke	9,192	10.38	+2.41
United Australia	Juanita Paterson	6,340	7.16	+2.27
One Nation	James Ingarfill	3,489	3.94	+3.94
Liberal Democrats	Patrizia Barcatta	3,403	3.84	+3.84
Independent (United People's Party)	Aijaz Moinuddin	2,535	2.86	+1.72
Victorian Socialists	Claudio Uribe	1,482	1.67	+1.67
Federation	Peter Malliaros	951	1.07	+1.07
Total formal votes		88,522	93.90	−1.62
Informal votes		5,752	6.10	+1.62
Turnout		94,274	88.15	−0.62
Two-party-preferred result
Labor	Joanne Ryan	55,613	62.82	+0.36
Liberal	Ravi Gaddipati	32,909	37.18	−0.36
Labor hold		Swing	+0.36	

Alluvial diagram for preference flows in the seat of Lalor in the 2022 federal election. indicates at what stage the winning candidate had over 50% of the votes and was declared the winner.

=== La Trobe ===
2022 Australian federal election: La Trobe
Party	Candidate	Votes	%	±%
Liberal	Jason Wood	41,786	45.58	−0.20
Labor	Abi Kumar	23,918	26.09	−7.55
Greens	Michael Schilling	9,980	10.89	+3.32
United Australia	Merryn Mott	6,182	6.74	+3.80
One Nation	Hadden Ervin	4,555	4.97	−0.62
Animal Justice	Helen Jeges	2,450	2.67	+2.67
Liberal Democrats	Michael Abelman	1,911	2.08	+2.08
Federation	Rebecca Skinner	890	0.97	+0.97
Total formal votes		91,672	95.34	−0.11
Informal votes		4,483	4.66	+0.11
Turnout		96,155	90.89	+1.67
Two-party-preferred result
Liberal	Jason Wood	53,803	58.69	+3.56
Labor	Abi Kumar	37,869	41.31	−3.56
Liberal hold		Swing	+3.56	

Alluvial diagram for preference flows in the seat of La Trobe in the 2022 federal election. indicates at what stage the winning candidate had over 50% of the votes and was declared the winner.

=== Macnamara ===
2022 Australian federal election: Macnamara
Party	Candidate	Votes	%	±%
Labor	Josh Burns	29,552	31.77	+0.93
Greens	Steph Hodgins-May	27,587	29.65	+5.46
Liberal	Colleen Harkin	26,976	29.00	−9.72
United Australia	Jane Hickey	2,062	2.22	+1.01
Liberal Democrats	Rob McCathie	1,946	2.09	+2.09
Independent	John Myers	1,835	1.97	+1.97
Animal Justice	Ben Schultz	1,724	1.85	−0.08
One Nation	Debera Anne	1,349	1.45	+1.45
Total formal votes		93,031	96.57	+0.36
Informal votes		3,302	3.43	−0.36
Turnout		96,333	87.10	−2.84
Two-party-preferred result
Labor	Josh Burns	57,911	62.25	+7.34
Liberal	Colleen Harkin	35,120	37.75	−7.34
Labor hold		Swing	+7.34	

Alluvial diagram for preference flows in the seat of Macnamara in the 2022 federal election. indicates at what stage the winning candidate had over 50% of the votes and was declared the winner.

=== Mallee ===
2022 Australian federal election: Mallee
Party	Candidate	Votes	%	±%
National	Anne Webster	50,187	49.09	+22.65
Labor	Carole Hart	17,133	16.76	+0.22
Independent	Sophie Baldwin	10,256	10.03	+10.03
United Australia	Stuart King	9,271	9.07	+5.56
One Nation	Vanessa Atkinson	6,901	6.75	+6.75
Greens	Sam McColl	5,463	5.34	+1.68
Independent	Claudia Haenel	2,196	2.15	+2.15
Citizens	Chris Lahy	822	0.80	+0.38
Total formal votes		102,229	94.36	+5.22
Informal votes		6,113	5.64	−5.22
Turnout		108,342	90.19	−4.09
Two-party-preferred result
National	Anne Webster	70,523	68.99	+3.31
Labor	Carole Hart	31,706	31.01	−3.31
National hold		Swing	+3.31	

Alluvial diagram for preference flows in the seat of Mallee in the 2022 federal election. indicates at what stage the winning candidate had over 50% of the votes and was declared the winner.

=== Maribyrnong ===
2022 Australian federal election: Maribyrnong
Party	Candidate	Votes	%	±%
Labor	Bill Shorten	39,792	42.35	−2.38
Liberal	Mira D'Silva	25,493	27.13	−7.64
Greens	Rhonda Pryor	15,278	16.26	+0.59
Liberal Democrats	Cameron Smith	3,577	3.81	+3.81
United Australia	Darren Besanko	3,433	3.65	+0.30
One Nation	Jodie Tindal	2,227	2.37	+2.37
Victorian Socialists	Daniel Dadich	1,837	1.95	+1.62
Great Australian	Mark Hobart	1,741	1.85	+1.85
Federation	Alexander Ansalone	590	0.63	+0.63
Total formal votes		93,968	95.03	−1.40
Informal votes		4,917	4.97	+1.40
Turnout		98,885	90.77	−2.73
Two-party-preferred result
Labor	Bill Shorten	58,679	62.45	+2.14
Liberal	Mira D'Silva	35,289	37.55	−2.14
Labor hold		Swing	+2.14	

Alluvial diagram for preference flows in the seat of Maribyrnong in the 2022 federal election. indicates at what stage the winning candidate had over 50% of the votes and was declared the winner.

=== McEwen ===
2022 Australian federal election: McEwen
Party	Candidate	Votes	%	±%
Labor	Rob Mitchell	35,238	36.81	−2.98
Liberal	Richard Welch	31,796	33.22	−1.77
Greens	Neil Barker	13,524	14.13	+4.66
United Australia	Paul McRae	5,474	5.72	+2.46
One Nation	Chris Bradbury	5,387	5.63	+0.51
Liberal Democrats	John Herron	2,579	2.69	+2.69
Federation	Christopher Neil	1,721	1.80	+1.80
Total formal votes		95,719	96.07	+1.01
Informal votes		3,918	3.93	−1.01
Turnout		99,637	92.23	+0.07
Two-party-preferred result
Labor	Rob Mitchell	50,998	53.28	−2.00
Liberal	Richard Welch	44,721	46.72	+2.00
Labor hold		Swing	−2.00	

Alluvial diagram for preference flows in the seat of McEwen in the 2022 federal election. indicates at what stage the winning candidate had over 50% of the votes and was declared the winner.

=== Melbourne ===
2022 Australian federal election: Melbourne
Party	Candidate	Votes	%	±%
Greens	Adam Bandt	47,883	49.62	+1.58
Labor	Keir Paterson	24,155	25.03	+3.91
Liberal	James Damches	14,660	15.19	−6.01
Victorian Socialists	Colleen Bolger	3,156	3.27	+3.27
United Australia	Justin Borg	1,709	1.77	+0.60
Liberal Democrats	Richard Peppard	1,596	1.65	+1.65
Animal Justice	Bruce Poon	1,316	1.36	−0.68
Independent	Scott Robson	1,094	1.13	+1.13
One Nation	Walter Stragan	937	0.97	+0.97
Total formal votes		96,506	96.99	+0.01
Informal votes		2,993	3.01	−0.01
Turnout		99,499	86.98	−2.64
Notional two-party-preferred count
Labor	Keir Paterson	75,191	77.91	+10.11
Liberal	James Damches	21,315	22.09	−10.11
Two-candidate-preferred result
Greens	Adam Bandt	58,050	60.15	−12.44
Labor	Keir Paterson	38,456	39.85	+39.85
Greens hold				

Alluvial diagram for preference flows in the seat of Melbourne in the 2022 federal election. indicates at what stage the winning candidate had over 50% of the votes and was declared the winner.

=== Menzies ===
2022 Australian federal election: Menzies
Party	Candidate	Votes	%	±%
Liberal	Keith Wolahan	42,526	42.10	−8.77
Labor	Naomi Oakley	33,635	33.30	+2.77
Greens	Bill Pheasant	14,289	14.14	+4.01
Liberal Democrats	Greg Cheesman	3,646	3.61	+3.61
United Australia	Nathan Scaglione	3,643	3.61	+1.19
One Nation	John Hayes	2,312	2.29	+2.29
Federation	Sanjeev Sabhlok	968	0.96	+0.96
Total formal votes		101,019	96.79	+0.42
Informal votes		3,355	3.21	−0.42
Turnout		104,374	92.58	−2.65
Two-party-preferred result
Liberal	Keith Wolahan	51,198	50.68	−6.34
Labor	Naomi Oakley	49,821	49.32	+6.34
Liberal hold		Swing	−6.34	

Alluvial diagram for preference flows in the seat of Menzies in the 2022 federal election. indicates at what stage the winning candidate had over 50% of the votes and was declared the winner.

=== Monash ===
2022 Australian federal election: Monash
Party	Candidate	Votes	%	±%
Liberal	Russell Broadbent	36,546	37.79	−8.19
Labor	Jessica O'Donnell	24,759	25.60	−4.30
Independent	Deb Leonard	10,372	10.72	+10.72
Greens	Mat Morgan	9,533	9.86	+2.69
One Nation	Allan Hicken	7,289	7.54	+0.22
United Australia	Christine McShane	3,991	4.13	+0.18
Liberal Democrats	Meg Edwards	3,548	3.67	+3.67
Federation	David Welsh	674	0.70	+0.70
Total formal votes		96,712	95.32	−0.33
Informal votes		4,752	4.68	+0.33
Turnout		101,464	91.34	−1.20
Two-party-preferred result
Liberal	Russell Broadbent	51,156	52.90	−3.96
Labor	Jessica O'Donnell	45,556	47.10	+3.96
Liberal hold		Swing	−3.96	

Alluvial diagram for preference flows in the seat of Monash in the 2022 federal election. indicates at what stage the winning candidate had over 50% of the votes and was declared the winner.

=== Nicholls ===
2022 Australian federal election: Nicholls
Party	Candidate	Votes	%	±%
National	Sam Birrell	24,886	26.14	−25.13
Independent	Rob Priestly	24,287	25.51	+25.51
Liberal	Steve Brooks	17,187	18.06	+18.06
Labor	Bill Lodwick	10,970	11.52	−7.89
One Nation	Rikkie-Lee Tyrrell	6,219	6.53	−4.76
United Australia	Robert Peterson	3,821	4.01	−1.32
Liberal Democrats	Tim Laird	3,366	3.54	+3.54
Greens	Ian Christoe	3,058	3.21	−1.00
Fusion	Andrea Otto	653	0.69	+0.69
Citizens	Jeff Davy	377	0.40	+0.40
Federation	Eleonor Tabone	367	0.39	+0.39
Total formal votes		95,191	92.11	−0.43
Informal votes		8,159	7.89	+0.43
Turnout		103,350	90.35	−2.98
Notional two-party-preferred count
National	Sam Birrell	63,918	67.15	−2.88
Labor	Bill Lodwick	31,273	32.85	+2.88
Two-candidate-preferred result
National	Sam Birrell	51,221	53.81	−16.22
Independent	Rob Priestly	43,970	46.19	+46.19
National hold				

Alluvial diagram for preference flows in the seat of Nicholls in the 2022 federal election. indicates at what stage the winning candidate had over 50% of the votes and was declared the winner.

=== Scullin ===
2022 Australian federal election: Scullin
Party	Candidate	Votes	%	±%
Labor	Andrew Giles	42,147	46.25	−14.17
Liberal	Virosh Perera	19,780	21.71	−0.60
Greens	Patchouli Paterson	9,953	10.92	+4.25
United Australia	Yassin Albarri	7,444	8.17	+3.13
One Nation	Ursula van Bree	5,907	6.48	+6.48
Liberal Democrats	Eric Koelmeyer	3,422	3.76	+3.76
Victorian Socialists	Cameron Rowe	2,469	2.71	+2.71
Total formal votes		91,122	94.31	−0.47
Informal votes		5,494	5.69	+0.47
Turnout		96,616	88.98	−3.25
Two-party-preferred result
Labor	Andrew Giles	59,761	65.58	−6.08
Liberal	Virosh Perera	31,361	34.42	+6.08
Labor hold		Swing	−6.08	

Alluvial diagram for preference flows in the seat of Scullin in the 2022 federal election. indicates at what stage the winning candidate had over 50% of the votes and was declared the winner.

=== Wannon ===
2022 Australian federal election: Wannon
Party	Candidate	Votes	%	±%
Liberal	Dan Tehan	44,948	44.46	−6.63
Independent	Alex Dyson	19,504	19.29	+9.64
Labor	Gilbert Wilson	19,303	19.09	−6.85
Greens	Hilary McAllister	6,444	6.37	−0.39
United Australia	Craige Kensen	3,308	3.27	−2.27
One Nation	Ronnie Graham	3,275	3.24	+3.24
Independent	Graham Garner	2,346	2.32	+2.32
Liberal Democrats	Amanda Mead	1,973	1.95	+1.95
Total formal votes		101,101	94.75	−1.47
Informal votes		5,603	5.25	+1.47
Turnout		106,704	92.22	−2.84
Notional two-party-preferred count
Liberal	Dan Tehan	59,722	59.07	−1.10
Labor	Gilbert Wilson	41,379	40.93	+1.10
Two-candidate-preferred result
Liberal	Dan Tehan	54,517	53.92	−6.24
Independent	Alex Dyson	46,584	46.08	+46.08
Liberal hold				

Alluvial diagram for preference flows in the seat of Wannon in the 2022 federal election. indicates at what stage the winning candidate had over 50% of the votes and was declared the winner.

=== Wills ===
2022 Australian federal election: Wills
Party	Candidate	Votes	%	±%
Labor	Peter Khalil	35,449	38.87	−5.39
Greens	Sarah Jefford	25,793	28.28	+2.01
Liberal	Tom Wright	15,771	17.29	−0.76
United Australia	Irene Zivkovic	3,352	3.68	+0.54
Socialist Alliance	Sue Bolton	3,096	3.39	+3.39
Victorian Socialists	Emma Black	2,714	2.98	−1.53
One Nation	Jill Tindal	2,554	2.80	+2.80
Animal Justice	Leah Horsfall	1,680	1.84	−1.92
Federation	Sam Sergi	789	0.87	+0.87
Total formal votes		91,198	94.95	−0.77
Informal votes		4,855	5.05	+0.77
Turnout		96,053	88.61	−2.55
Notional two-party-preferred count
Labor	Peter Khalil	69,104	75.77	+0.06
Liberal	Tom Wright	22,094	24.23	−0.06
Two-candidate-preferred result
Labor	Peter Khalil	53,415	58.57	+0.10
Greens	Sarah Jefford	37,783	41.43	−0.10
Labor hold		Swing	+0.10	

Alluvial diagram for preference flows in the seat of Wills in the 2022 federal election. indicates at what stage the winning candidate had over 50% of the votes and was declared the winner.
