= Marcus Bastiaan =

Australian businessman (born 1990)

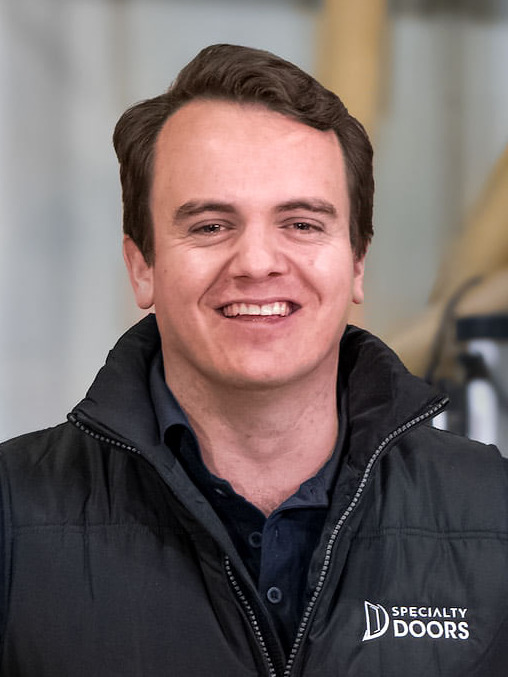
- Bastiaan in the 2020s

Personal details
- Born: Melbourne, Victoria
- Party: Liberal Party
- Spouse: Stephanie Bastiaan

Marcus Bastiaan (born 1990) is a former political powerbroker and vice-president of the Victorian Division of the Liberal Party of Australia and a current director of Forest and Wood Communities Australia.

== Early life ==
Marcus Bastiaan was born in Victoria, Australia, and grew up on a farm on the Mornington Peninsula. He was educated at Peninsula Grammar and later Brighton Grammar School.

== Politics ==
Bastiaan joined the Liberal Party in Victoria in 2010. In 2012, he stood unsuccessfully for Bayside Council in Melbourne's inner south local government election. Bastiaan polled the third-highest primary among 16 candidates and lost on preferences. Bastiaan later became chair of the party's Goldstein branch and Brighton branch. Between 2015 and 2018 Bastiaan was elected to the Liberal Party's Administrative Committee and served as Vice Chairman and Chairman of the Party's Membership and Training Committee.

Bastiaan has written in the Herald Sun and Spectator advocating for democratisation and greater parliamentary renewal within the Liberal Party. Bastiaan has been critical of lobbyist and union involvement within political parties, stating "Union or lobbyist domination of governments leads to broad-based supporter disenchantment, political cronyism and widespread voter disillusionment.” Bastiaan was a supporter of the NSW Liberal Party Democratic Reform, speaking alongside former Prime Minister Tony Abbott.

He has been seen by some as a protégé of former Victorian state Liberal president Michael Kroger. In 2017, Kroger/Bastiaan group took control of the Liberal Victorian Administrative Committee.

Bastiaan was elected metropolitan vice-president of the administrative committee in 2018, but stepped down in the same year due to family illness.

The Age newspaper reported leaked text messages allegedly from Bastiaan that used homophobic terms. Bastiaan was cleared of “detrimental conduct” by a Liberal Party investigation.

Opponents within the Liberal Party have accused Bastiaan of branch stacking., specifically branch stacking with members of socially conservative groups and churches, including the Mormon community.

In August 2020, allegations were made by Channel Nine's 60 Minutes and The Age that Bastiaan was involved in branch stacking activities including installing faction operatives in Michael Sukkar and Kevin Andrews’ electorate offices. Bastiaan rejected these allegations. He stated that his role as Chair of the Membership and Training Committee was to recruit and train members.

Bastiaan was also accused of installing factional operatives in Michael Sukkar and Kevin Andrews' electorate offices.

Bastiaan launched legal proceedings against Nine Entertainment (the owner of the Nine Network, The Age and The Sydney Morning Herald) following the 60 Minutes program. Nine Entertainment settled a defamation lawsuit with Bastiaan, leading to the removal of dozens of articles and social media posts.

Bastiaan was further cleared of any wrongdoing by the Liberal Party and no finding against Baastian were found by independent auditor Korda Mentha.

Following Bastiaan’s legal win he appeared on Sky News with Cory Bernardi stating "until the Liberal Party in Victoria can work out how it's going to govern itself it will never govern in Victoria." He appealed to the Victorian Liberal Party to "get back to its fundamental values set, and that is to reduce the size of government and the cost of government”.

Bastiaan continues to be involved in internal Liberal Party politics and advocates for policy issues, writing and appearing in the media.

== Personal life ==
Bastiaan graduated from Brighton Grammar in 2008. He married Stephanie Ross in May 2017 at Our Lady of Victories Basilica Catholic Church in Camberwell. His wife writes for The Spectator, Australia. They have five daughters and live in Stirling, South Australia.

Bastiaan is the son of Ross Bastiaan and the grandson of Wolfe Morris.
