= Matt Gregg (politician) =

Australian politician

Matt Gregg MP

Member of the Australian Parliament for Deakin
- Incumbent
- Assumed office 3 May 2025
- Preceded by: Michael Sukkar

Personal details
- Party: Labor
- Occupation: Politician

Matthew Gregg is an Australian politician and lawyer who has served as the member of Parliament (MP) for the Victorian division of Deakin since 2025. He is a member of the Labor Party.

Gregg began a career as a teacher after completing qualifications in Law, Education and Community Development. He worked in a variety of schools, from regional to metro, public, private and specialist. He then began working as a lawyer.

Gregg previously contested the seat in 2022 but lost to Michael Sukkar by a margin of 375 votes. He is a member of the Labor Right.

Parliament of Australia
Preceded by Michael Sukkar	Member for Deakin; 2025–present	Incumbent
