= Michael Sukkar =

Australian politician (born 1981)

The Honourable Michael Sukkar
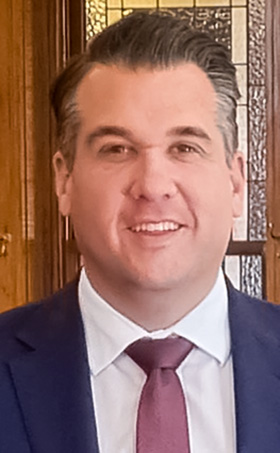
- Sukkar in 2024

Manager of Opposition Business in the House
- In office 25 January 2025 – 3 May 2025
- Deputy: Kevin Hogan
- Leader: Peter Dutton
- Preceded by: Paul Fletcher
- Succeeded by: Alex Hawke

Assistant Treasurer
- In office 29 May 2019 – 23 May 2022
- Prime Minister: Scott Morrison
- Minister: Josh Frydenberg
- Preceded by: Stuart Robert
- Succeeded by: Stephen Jones

Minister for Housing
- In office 29 May 2019 – 23 May 2022
- Prime Minister: Scott Morrison
- Minister: Anne Ruston
- Preceded by: Sarah Henderson
- Succeeded by: Julie Collins

Minister for Homelessness, Social and Community Housing
- In office 22 December 2020 – 23 May 2022
- Prime Minister: Scott Morrison
- Minister: Anne Ruston
- Preceded by: Luke Howarth
- Succeeded by: Julie Collins

Member of the Australian Parliament for Deakin
- In office 7 September 2013 – 3 May 2025
- Preceded by: Mike Symon
- Succeeded by: Matt Gregg

Personal details
- Born: 11 September 1981 (age 45) Melbourne, Australia
- Party: Liberal
- Spouse: Anna Sukkar
- Education: Deakin University; University of Melbourne
- Profession: Politician; Lawyer
- Website: michaelsukkar.com.au

Michael Sven Sukkar (Arabic: [swkar]; born 11 September 1981) is an Australian former politician who was the Assistant Treasurer and Minister for Housing and as the Minister for Homelessness, Social and Community Housing in the Abbott-Turnbull-Morrison Liberal government. From 2022 to 2025, Sukkar was the Shadow Minister for Housing, NDIS, and Social Services from 2022 to 2025. He was a member of the House of Representatives from his first election in September 2013 to his defeat in May 2025, representing the Division of Deakin in Victoria for the Liberal Party.

== Early life and background ==
Sukkar was born in the eastern Melbourne suburb of Ringwood, to a father who was born in Lebanon and an Australian-born mother of Norwegian origin. He attended primary school at Sacred Heart in Croydon and then secondary school at Aquinas College in Ringwood. He completed a Bachelor of Laws and Bachelor of Commerce at Deakin University in 2004 and Master of Laws at the University of Melbourne in 2010.

In 2005, Sukkar worked as a taxation consultant at accounting firm PricewaterhouseCoopers. From 2006, he spent seven years working as a tax lawyer with the firm Blake Dawson Waldron (later acquired by Ashurst Australia) where he was a senior associate.

In 2008, Sukkar suffered a cardiac arrest while playing basketball, and was treated by a nurse and anaesthetist who were at the game and an off-duty paramedic who was nearby. Sukkar later advocated for defibrillators when elected to parliament.

== Political career ==
=== Entry to Parliament ===
In 2012, Sukkar was endorsed as the Liberal Party candidate for the marginal seat of Deakin. He won the seat at the 2013 election with a swing to the Liberal Party of 3.8 points, defeating Labor MP Mike Symon to join the government benches of the Abbott government. Sukkar served on a number of parliamentary committees in this Parliament, such as the Chairman of the Parliamentary Joint Committee on Intelligence and Security. In 2014 Sukkar launched the Deakin 200 Club with other conservative Liberal MPs to fundraise for marginal seats held by conservatives within the party.

=== Turnbull government and first ministry ===
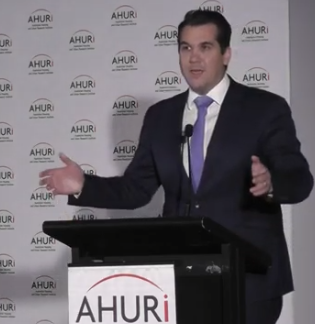
Michael Sukkar speaking on government initiatives to release Commonwealth land at a housing industry conference in May 2018

At the 2016 federal election, Sukkar increased his margin by 2.5 points, the Liberal Party's largest swing in Victoria. On 24 January 2017, Prime Minister Malcolm Turnbull, appointed Sukkar to the ministry as Assistant Treasurer. Turnbull gave Sukkar responsibility for addressing housing affordability. When asked about housing affordability on 20 February 2017, Sukkar told Sky News that "we're also enabling young people to get highly paid jobs which is the first step to buying a house". Labor MP Tim Watts said in response that the remarks showed the Coalition was "back to where Joe Hockey started on housing affordability".

In June 2017 Sukkar, Greg Hunt, and Alan Tudge faced the possibility of prosecution for contempt of court after criticising a court's sentencing of terrorists. They avoided prosecution by making an unconditional apology to the Victorian Court of Appeal.

=== Morrison government and return to ministry ===
Sukkar supported Minister for Home Affairs Peter Dutton during the Liberal leadership spill in August 2018, and had a pivotal role in removing then-Prime Minister Malcolm Turnbull. However, when Scott Morrison defeated Dutton in the corresponding leadership contest, Sukkar was relegated to the government backbench.

Sukkar was re-elected with a reduced margin at the May 2019 federal election and was then appointed Assistant Treasurer in the Morrison ministry. In December 2020, Sukkar was given further responsibilities, being sworn in to the roles of Minister for Housing and Minister for Homelessness, Social and Community Housing, in addition to Assistant Treasurer.

In January 2021, the Australian Broadcasting Corporation reported that the Australian Security Intelligence Organisation (ASIO) was investigating a donor with ties to Sukkar over foreign interference risks.

=== Allegations of branch stacking ===
Sukkar has been accused of branch stacking, of which he was cleared of "serious misuse" of Commonwealth funds when it moved to formal investigation. However the inquiry did not interview any witnesses or staff from the electorate offices, from which the stacking was alleged to have taken place.

In August 2020, there were allegations that Sukkar misused his taxpayer-funded staff for branch stacking and smear campaigns. Sukkar referred himself to the Finance Department for an investigation, and in October 2020 it was found that there was an insufficient basis to reach a finding of serious misuse of money or resources. It was later revealed that the investigation was outsourced to a law firm where Sukkar worked for seven years.

In 2021, further allegations of branch stacking were aired by 60 Minutes and the Nine newspapers against Sukkar and Marcus Bastiaan, which Sukkar denied.

=== 2022 election and opposition ===
At the 2022 Australian federal election, Sukkar held his seat by 375 votes, making it the most marginal Liberal seat in the nation. Upon the defeat of the Coalition, he was appointed as the Shadow Minister for Social Services by Opposition Leader Peter Dutton in June of that year.

As Shadow Minister for Housing and Homelessness, he called the Labor Party's Housing Australia Future Fund a "Ponzi scheme".

=== Defeat at 2025 election ===
As part of a state and nation-wide swing against the Liberals, Sukkar lost the seat of Deakin at the 2025 Australian federal election to Labor’s Matt Gregg.

== Political views ==
Sukkar is a member of the National Right faction of the Liberal Party.

In his maiden speech, Sukkar categorised himself as an "economic liberal" and with "strong conservative foundations". He credited his Catholic religion as being one of the two most significant influences in his life, in addition to his family. At an Australian Christian Lobby forum in 2013, he expressed support for the school chaplaincy program.

Sukkar opposed same-sex marriage during the Australian Marriage Law Postal Survey. Although initially stating he would follow the outcome of the survey, Sukkar abstained from the vote despite his electorate voting 66% in favour, saying that he could not support the bill.

Sukkar also intervened during the development of the 2021 Australian census to exclude questions about gender and sexuality despite these being recommended for inclusion by the Australian Bureau of Statistics.

Sukkar opposed the Voice to Parliament, describing it as "divisive".

== Personal life ==
Sukkar married Anna Duthie in 2010. They have two sons. He has two investment properties in Ringwood North and Canberra. He resides in Blackburn.

Sukkar is a fan of soccer, and attended the 1998 FIFA World Cup qualification match between Australia and Iran when he was 15 years old.

Parliament of Australia
Preceded by Mike Symon	Member for Deakin; 2013–2025	Succeeded by Matt Gregg
Political offices
Preceded by Stuart Robert	Assistant Treasurer; 2019–2022	Succeeded by Stephen Jones
Preceded by Sarah Henderson	Minister for Housing; 2019–2022	Succeeded by Julie Collins
Preceded by Luke Howarth	Minister for Homelessness, Social and Community Housing; 2020–2022	Succeeded by Julie Collins
