= Members of the Australian House of Representatives, 2022–2025 =

- ←2019–2022 2025–2028→
- Composition (at dissolution) Government (77): Labor (77); Opposition (53); Coalition: Liberal (39) (Note: Including 15 Liberal National Party of Queensland (LNP) MPs who sit in the Liberals party room); National (14) (Note: Including 5 Liberal National Party of Queensland (LNP) MPs who sit in the Nationals party room); Crossbench (19): Greens (4); Katter's Australian (1); Centre Alliance (1); Independent (13) (Note: Russell Broadbent; Kate Chaney; Zoe Daniel; Andrew Gee; Ian Goodenough; Helen Haines; Dai Le; Monique Ryan; Sophie Scamps; Allegra Spender; Zali Steggall; Kylea Tink; Andrew Wilkie); Vacant (2) (Note: Division of Hinkler and Division of Maribyrnong)

This is a list of members of the House of Representatives of the 47th Parliament of Australia (2022–2025). They were elected in the 2022 Australian federal election or subsequent by-elections.

== Leadership ==
=== Presiding officer ===
Office	Party	Officer	Electorate	State	Term
Speaker	Labor	Milton Dick	Oxley	QLD	26 July 2022 – current
Deputy Speaker	Labor	Sharon Claydon	Newcastle	NSW	26 July 2022 – current
Second Deputy Speaker	Liberal	Ian Goodenough	Moore	WA	26 July 2022 – 2024
Second Deputy Speaker	Independent	Ian Goodenough	Moore	WA	2024 – 3 May 2025

=== Government leadership ===
Office	Officer	Electorate	State	Term of office
Leader of the House	Tony Burke	Watson	NSW	1 June 2022 – current
Chief Whip	Joanne Ryan	Lalor	Vic	31 May 2022 – current
Whip	Anne Stanley	Werriwa	NSW	2 July 2019 – current
Whip	David Smith	Bean	ACT	31 May 2022 – current

=== Opposition leadership ===
Office	Officer	Electorate	State	Term in office
Manager of Opposition Business	Paul Fletcher	Bradfield	NSW	5 June 2022 – 25 January 2025
Manager of Opposition Business	Michael Sukkar	Deakin	VIC	25 January 2025 – 3 May 2025
Chief Opposition Whip	Bert van Manen	Forde	QLD	26 July 2022 – 3 May 2025
Whip	Melissa Price	Durack	WA	26 July 2022 – 3 May 2025
Whip	Rowan Ramsey	Grey	SA	26 July 2022 – 3 May 2025

== Members ==
Member		Party	Electorate	State	Years in office
Anthony Albanese	Anthony Albanese (born 1963)	Labor	Grayndler	NSW	1996–current
	Anne Aly (born 1967)	Labor	Cowan	WA	2016–current
	Michelle Ananda-Rajah (born 1972)	Labor	Higgins	Vic	2022–2025
Karen Andrews	Karen Andrews (born 1960)	Liberal (Note: Member of the LNP who sits with the Liberal Party.)	McPherson	Qld	2010–2025
Bridget Archer	Bridget Archer (born 1975)	Liberal	Bass	Tas	2019–2025
Adam Bandt	Adam Bandt (born 1972)	Greens	Melbourne	Vic	2010–2025
Stephen Bates	Stephen Bates (born 1992)	Greens	Brisbane	Qld	2022–2025
	Angie Bell (born 1968)	Liberal	Moncrieff	Qld	2019–current
Jodie Belyea	Jodie Belyea (born 1967)	Labor	Dunkley	Vic	2024–current
	Sam Birrell (born 1975)	National	Nicholls	Vic	2022–current
Chris Bowen	Chris Bowen (born 1973)	Labor	McMahon	NSW	2004–current
Colin Boyce	Colin Boyce (born 1962)	National (Note: Member of the LNP who sits with the National Party.)	Flynn	Qld	2022–current
Russell Broadbent	Russell Broadbent (born 1950)	Liberal / Independent (Note: Russell Broadbent, MP for Monash, resigned from the Liberal Party on 14 November 2023 and moved to the crossbench to sit as an independent.)	Monash	Vic	1990–1993; 1996–1998; 2004–2025
Scott Buchholz	Scott Buchholz (born 1968)	Liberal	Wright	Qld	2010–current
Tony Burke	Tony Burke (born 1969)	Labor	Watson	NSW	2004–current
Matt Burnell	Matt Burnell (born 1978)	Labor	Spence	SA	2022–current
Linda Burney	Linda Burney (born 1957)	Labor	Barton	NSW	2016–2025
Josh Burns	Josh Burns (born 1987)	Labor	Macnamara	Vic	2019–current
Mark Butler	Mark Butler (born 1970)	Labor	Hindmarsh	SA	2007–current
Alison Byrnes	Alison Byrnes (born 1974)	Labor	Cunningham	NSW	2022–current
	Cameron Caldwell (Note: Stuart Robert, Liberal National MP for Fadden, resigned on 18 May 2023. The resulting by-election was won by Liberal National candidate Cameron Caldwell on 15 July 2023.) (born 1979)	Liberal	Fadden	Qld	2023–current
Jim Chalmers	Jim Chalmers (born 1978)	Labor	Rankin	Qld	2013–current
Max Chandler-Mather	Max Chandler-Mather (born 1992)	Greens	Griffith	Qld	2022–2025
Kate Chaney	Kate Chaney (born 1975)	Independent	Curtin	WA	2022–current
Andrew Charlton	Andrew Charlton (born 1978)	Labor	Parramatta	NSW	2022–current
Darren Chester	Darren Chester (born 1967)	National	Gippsland	Vic	2008–current
Lisa Chesters	Lisa Chesters (born 1980)	Labor	Bendigo	Vic	2013–current
Jason Clare	Jason Clare (born 1972)	Labor	Blaxland	NSW	2007–current
	Sharon Claydon (born 1964)	Labor	Newcastle	NSW	2013–current
Libby Coker	Libby Coker (born 1962)	Labor	Corangamite	Vic	2019–current
David Coleman	David Coleman (born 1974)	Liberal	Banks	NSW	2013–2025
Julie Collins	Julie Collins (born 1971)	Labor	Franklin	Tas	2007–current
	Pat Conaghan (born 1971)	National	Cowper	NSW	2019–current
Pat Conroy	Pat Conroy (born 1979)	Labor	Shortland	NSW	2013–current
Mark Coulton	Mark Coulton (born 1958)	National	Parkes	NSW	2007–2025
Zoe Daniel	Zoe Daniel (born 1972)	Independent	Goldstein	Vic	2022–current
Milton Dick	Milton Dick (born 1972)	Labor	Oxley	Qld	2016–current
	Mary Doyle (Note: Alan Tudge, the Liberal MP for Aston, resigned on 17 February 2023. The resulting by-election was won by Labor candidate Mary Doyle on 1 April 2023.) (born 1970)	Labor	Aston	Vic	2023–current
Mark Dreyfus	Mark Dreyfus (born 1956)	Labor	Isaacs	Vic	2007–current
Peter Dutton	Peter Dutton (born 1970)	Liberal	Dickson	Qld	2001–2025
Justine Elliot	Justine Elliot (born 1967)	Labor	Richmond	NSW	2004–current
	Warren Entsch (born 1950)	Liberal	Leichhardt	Qld	1996–2007; 2010–2025
Cassandra Fernando	Cassandra Fernando (born 1987)	Labor	Holt	Vic	2022–current
Paul Fletcher	Paul Fletcher (born 1965)	Liberal	Bradfield	NSW	2009–2025
	Mike Freelander (born 1953)	Labor	Macarthur	NSW	2016–current
Carina Garland	Carina Garland (born 1982)	Labor	Chisholm	Vic	2022–current
Andrew Gee	Andrew Gee (born 1968)	National / Independent (Note: Andrew Gee, the MP for Calare, resigned from the National Party on 23 December 2022 and sat on the crossbench as an independent.)	Calare	NSW	2016–current
Steve Georganas	Steve Georganas (born 1959)	Labor	Adelaide	SA	2004–2013; 2016–current
Andrew Giles	Andrew Giles (born 1973)	Labor	Scullin	Vic	2013–current
David Gillespie	David Gillespie (born 1957)	National	Lyne	NSW	2013–2025
Ian Goodenough	Ian Goodenough (born 1975)	Liberal	Moore	WA	2013–2025
	Patrick Gorman (born 1984)	Labor	Perth	WA	2018–current
Luke Gosling	Luke Gosling (born 1971)	Labor	Solomon	NT	2016–current
Helen Haines	Helen Haines (born 1961)	Independent	Indi	Vic	2019–current
	Garth Hamilton (born 1979)	Liberal	Groom	Qld	2020–current
	Andrew Hastie (born 1982)	Liberal	Canning	WA	2015–current
Alex Hawke	Alex Hawke (born 1977)	Liberal	Mitchell	NSW	2007–current
Julian Hill	Julian Hill (born 1973)	Labor	Bruce	Vic	2016–current
Kevin Hogan	Kevin Hogan (born 1963)	National	Page	NSW	2013–current
	Luke Howarth (born 1972)	Liberal	Petrie	Qld	2013–2025
	Ed Husic (born 1970)	Labor	Chifley	NSW	2010–current
Stephen Jones	Stephen Jones (born 1965)	Labor	Whitlam	NSW	2010–2025
Barnaby Joyce	Barnaby Joyce (born 1967)	National	New England	NSW	2013–2017; 2017–current
Bob Katter	Bob Katter (born 1945)	Katter's Australian	Kennedy	Qld	1993–current
Ged Kearney	Ged Kearney (born 1963)	Labor	Cooper	Vic	2018–current
	Simon Kennedy (born 1982)	Liberal	Cook	NSW	2024–current
Matt Keogh	Matt Keogh (born 1981)	Labor	Burt	WA	2016–current
	Peter Khalil (born 1973)	Labor	Wills	Vic	2016–current
Catherine King	Catherine King (born 1966)	Labor	Ballarat	Vic	2001–current
Madeleine King	Madeleine King (born 1973)	Labor	Brand	WA	2016–current
Michelle Landry	Michelle Landry (born 1962)	National	Capricornia	Qld	2013–current
	Tania Lawrence (born 1973)	Labor	Hasluck	WA	2022–current
Jerome Laxale	Jerome Laxale (born 1983)	Labor	Bennelong	NSW	2022–current
Dai Le	Dai Le (born 1968)	Independent	Fowler	NSW	2022–current
	Julian Leeser (born 1976)	Liberal	Berowra	NSW	2016–current
Andrew Leigh	Andrew Leigh (born 1972)	Labor	Fenner	ACT	2010–current
	Sussan Ley (born 1961)	Liberal	Farrer	NSW	2001–2026
	Sam Lim (born 1961)	Labor	Tangney	WA	2022–current
David Littleproud	David Littleproud (born 1976)	National	Maranoa	Qld	2016–current
Nola Marino	Nola Marino (born 1954)	Liberal	Forrest	WA	2007–2025
Richard Marles	Richard Marles (born 1967)	Labor	Corio	Vic	2007–current
	Zaneta Mascarenhas (born 1980)	Labor	Swan	WA	2022–current
Kristy McBain	Kristy McBain (born 1982)	Labor	Eden-Monaro	NSW	2020–current
Emma McBride	Emma McBride (born 1975)	Labor	Dobell	NSW	2016–current
Michael McCormack	Michael McCormack (born 1964)	National	Riverina	NSW	2010–current
Melissa McIntosh	Melissa McIntosh (born 1977)	Liberal	Lindsay	NSW	2019–current
	Zoe McKenzie (born 1972)	Liberal	Flinders	Vic	2022–current
Louise Miller-Frost	Louise Miller-Frost (born 1967)	Labor	Boothby	SA	2022–current
	Brian Mitchell (born 1967)	Labor	Lyons	Tas	2016–2025
Rob Mitchell	Rob Mitchell (born 1967)	Labor	McEwen	Vic	2010–current
Scott Morrison	Scott Morrison (born 1968)	Liberal	Cook	NSW	2007–2024
Daniel Mulino	Daniel Mulino (born 1969)	Labor	Fraser	Vic	2019–current
Peta Murphy	Peta Murphy (1973–2023)	Labor	Dunkley	Vic	2019–2023
Shayne Neumann	Shayne Neumann (born 1961)	Labor	Blair	Qld	2007–current
	Llew O'Brien (born 1972)	National	Wide Bay	Qld	2016–current
	Ted O'Brien (born 1974)	Liberal	Fairfax	Qld	2016–current
	Brendan O'Connor (born 1962)	Labor	Gorton	Vic	2001–2025
Clare O'Neil	Clare O'Neil (born 1980)	Labor	Hotham	Vic	2013–current
	Tony Pasin (born 1977)	Liberal	Barker	SA	2013–current
	Alicia Payne (born 1982)	Labor	Canberra	ACT	2019–current
Gavin Pearce	Gavin Pearce (born 1967)	Liberal	Braddon	Tas	2019–2025
Graham Perrett	Graham Perrett (born 1966)	Labor	Moreton	Qld	2007–2025
Fiona Philips	Fiona Phillips (born 1970)	Labor	Gilmore	NSW	2019–current
	Henry Pike (born 1987)	Liberal	Bowman	Qld	2022–current
Keith Pitt	Keith Pitt (born 1969)	National	Hinkler	Qld	2013–2025
Tanya Plibersek	Tanya Plibersek (born 1969)	Labor	Sydney	NSW	1998–current
	Melissa Price (born 1963)	Liberal	Durack	WA	2013–current
	Sam Rae (born 1986)	Labor	Hawke	Vic	2022–current
Rowan Ramsey	Rowan Ramsey (born 1956)	Liberal	Grey	SA	2007–2025
	Gordon Reid (born 1992)	Labor	Robertson	NSW	2022–current
Dan Repacholi	Dan Repacholi (born 1982)	Labor	Hunter	NSW	2022–current
Amanda Rishworth	Amanda Rishworth (born 1978)	Labor	Kingston	SA	2007–current
Stuart Robert	Stuart Robert (born 1970)	Liberal	Fadden	Qld	2007–2023
	Tracey Roberts (born ?)	Labor	Pearce	WA	2022–current
Michelle Rowland	Michelle Rowland (born 1971)	Labor	Greenway	NSW	2010–current
Joanne Ryan	Joanne Ryan (born 1961)	Labor	Lalor	Vic	2013–current
Monique Ryan	Monique Ryan (born 1967)	Independent	Kooyong	Vic	2022–current
Sophie Scamps	Sophie Scamps (born 1971)	Independent	Mackellar	NSW	2022–current
Marion Scrymgour	Marion Scrymgour (born 1960)	Labor	Lingiari	NT (Note: The Division of Lingiari within the Northern Territory also includes the respective external territories of Cocos (Keeling) Islands and Christmas Island.)	2022–current
Rebekha Sharkie	Rebekha Sharkie (born 1972)	Centre Alliance	Mayo	SA	2016–2018; 2018–current
Sally Sitou	Sally Sitou (born 1982)	Labor	Reid	NSW	2022–current
Allegra Spender	Allegra Spender (born 1978)	Independent	Wentworth	NSW	2022–current
Bill Shorten	Bill Shorten (born 1967)	Labor	Maribyrnong	Vic	2007–2025
David Smith	David Smith (born 1970)	Labor	Bean	ACT (Note: The Division of Bean within the Australian Capital Territory also includes the external territory of Norfolk Island.)	2019–current
Anne Stanley	Anne Stanley (born 1961)	Labor	Werriwa	NSW	2016–current
Zali Steggall	Zali Steggall (born 1974)	Independent	Warringah	NSW	2019–current
	James Stevens (born 1983)	Liberal	Sturt	SA	2019–2025
Michael Sukkar	Michael Sukkar (born 1981)	Liberal	Deakin	Vic	2013–2025
Meryl Swanson	Meryl Swanson (born 1970)	Labor	Paterson	NSW	2016–current
Angus Taylor	Angus Taylor (born 1966)	Liberal	Hume	NSW	2013–current
Dan Tehan	Dan Tehan (born 1968)	Liberal	Wannon	Vic	2010–current
	Susan Templeman (born 1963)	Labor	Macquarie	NSW	2016–current
Matt Thistlethwaite	Matt Thistlethwaite (born 1972)	Labor	Kingsford Smith	NSW	2013–current
Phillip Thompson	Phillip Thompson (born 1988)	Liberal	Herbert	Qld	2019–current
Kate Thwaites	Kate Thwaites (born 1980)	Labor	Jagajaga	Vic	2019–current
Kylea Tink	Kylea Tink (born 1970)	Independent	North Sydney	NSW	2022–2025
Alan Tudge	Alan Tudge (born 1971)	Liberal	Aston	Vic	2010–2023
Maria Vamvakinou	Maria Vamvakinou (born 1959)	Labor	Calwell	Vic	2001–2025
Bert van Manen	Bert van Manen (born 1965)	Liberal	Forde	Qld	2010–2025
Ross Vasta	Ross Vasta (born 1966)	Liberal	Bonner	Qld	2004–2007; 2010–2025
	Aaron Violi (born 1984)	Liberal	Casey	Vic	2022–current
Andrew Wallace	Andrew Wallace (born 1968)	Liberal	Fisher	Qld	2016–current
	Jenny Ware (born 1970)	Liberal	Hughes	NSW	2022–2025
Elizabeth Watson-Brown	Elizabeth Watson-Brown (born 1956)	Greens	Ryan	Qld	2022–current
Tim Watts	Tim Watts (born 1982)	Labor	Gellibrand	Vic	2013–current
	Anne Webster (born 1959)	National	Mallee	Vic	2019–current
Anika Wells	Anika Wells (born 1985)	Labor	Lilley	Qld	2019–current
	Andrew Willcox (born 1969)	National	Dawson	Qld	2022–current
Andrew Wilkie	Andrew Wilkie (born 1961)	Independent	Clark	Tas	2010–current
Josh Wilson	Josh Wilson (born 1972)	Labor	Fremantle	WA	2016–2018; 2018–current
Rick Wilson	Rick Wilson (born 1966)	Liberal	O'Connor	WA	2013–current
Keith Wolahan	Keith Wolahan (born 1977)	Liberal	Menzies	Vic	2022–current
Jason Wood	Jason Wood (born 1968)	Liberal	La Trobe	Vic	2004–2010; 2013–current
Terry Young	Terry Young (born 1968)	Liberal	Longman	Qld	2019–current
Tony Zappia	Tony Zappia (born 1952)	Labor	Makin	SA	2007–current

== Current party standings ==
As of 14 November 2023.

↓
78	4	14	9	21	25
ALP	GRN	IND/OTH	NAT	LNP	LIB

=== Breakdown by state and territory ===
State/Territory	Labor		Coalition		Greens		Ind./Other		Total
New South Wales	26	55.3%	15	31.9%	0	–	6	12.8%	47
Victoria	25	64.1%	9	23.1%	1	2.6%	4	10.2%	39
Queensland	5	16.7%	21	70.0%	3	10.0%	1	3.0%	30
Western Australia	9	60.0%	5	33.3%	0	–	1	6.7%	15
South Australia	6	60.0%	3	30.0%	0	–	1	10.0%	10
Tasmania	2	40.0%	2	40.0%	0	–	1	20.0%	5
Australian Capital Territory	3	100.0%	0	–	0	–	0	–	3
Northern Territory	100.0%	0	–	0	–	0	–	2	
House of Representatives	78	51.7%	55	36.4%	4	2.6%	14	9.3%	151

== Changes of composition ==
=== Party composition ===
Over the course of the 47th Parliament, changes in membership resulted in changes to party composition, which are summarised below.

Affiliation	Party (shading shows control)								Total	Vacant
Affiliation	GRN	ALP	IND	CA	LPA	NPA	KAP	UAP	Total	Vacant
End of previous Parliament	1	68	4	1	60	15	1	1	151	0
Begin (26 July 2022)	4	77	10	1	42	16	1	—	151	0
23 December 2022 (Note: Andrew Gee, MP for Calare, resigned from the National Party on 23 December 2022 and began sitting as an independent.)	4	77	11	1	42	15	1	—	151	0
17 February 2023 (Note: Alan Tudge, Liberal MP for Aston, resigned on 17 February 2023. The resulting by-election was won by Labor candidate Mary Doyle on 1 April 2023.)	4	77	11	1	41	15	1	—	150	1
1 April 2023	4	78	11	1	41	15	1	—	151	0
18 May 2023	4	78	11	1	40	15	1	—	150	1
15 July 2023	4	78	11	1	41	15	1	—	151	0
14 November 2023	4	78	12	1	40	15	1	—	151	0
4 December 2023 (Note: Peta Murphy, Labor MP for Dunkley, died in office on 4 December 2023. The resulting by-election was won by Labor candidate Jodie Belyea on 2 March 2024.)	4	77	12	1	40	15	1	—	150	1
28 February 2024 (Note: Scott Morrison, Liberal MP for Cook, resigned on 28 February 2024. The resulting by-election was won by Liberal candidate Simon Kennedy on 13 April 2024.)	4	77	12	1	39	15	1	—	149	2
2 March 2024	4	78	12	1	39	15	1	—	150	1
13 April 2024	4	78	12	1	40	15	1	—	151	0
12 January 2025 (Note: Ian Goodenough, Liberal MP for Moore, had his party membership lapse on 12 January 2025. Consequently he sat as an independent MP for the remainder of his term.)	4	78	13	1	39	15	1	—	151	0
19 January 2025 (Note: Keith Pitt, Liberal National MP for Hinkler, resigned on 19 January 2025. No by-election was held as the resignation occurred sufficiently close enough to the federal election.)	4	78	13	1	39	14	1	—	150	1
20 January 2025 (Note: Bill Shorten, Labor MP for Maribyrnong, resigned on 20 January 2025. No by-election was held as the resignation occurred sufficiently close enough to the federal election.)	4	77	13	1	39	14	1	—	149	2
Latest voting share %	2.65	50.99	8.61	0.66	35.10		0.66	—		

=== Membership changes ===
This table lists members of the House who have resigned, died, been elected or appointed, or otherwise changed their party affiliation during the 47th Parliament.

Seat	Before		Change		After		
Seat	Member	Party	Type	Date	Date	Member	Party
Calare	Andrew Gee	National	Resignation from party	23 December 2022		Andrew Gee	Independent
Aston	Alan Tudge	Liberal	Resignation	17 February 2023	1 April 2023	Mary Doyle	Labor
Fadden	Stuart Robert	Liberal National	Resignation	18 May 2023	15 July 2023	Cameron Caldwell	Liberal National
Monash	Russell Broadbent	Liberal	Resignation from party	14 November 2023		Russell Broadbent	Independent
Dunkley	Peta Murphy	Labor	Death	4 December 2023	2 March 2024	Jodie Belyea	Labor
Cook	Scott Morrison	Liberal	Resignation	28 February 2024	13 April 2024	Simon Kennedy	Liberal
Moore	Ian Goodenough	Liberal	Party membership lapsed	12 January 2025		Ian Goodenough	Independent
Hinkler	Keith Pitt	Liberal National	Resignation	19 January 2025		Vacant	Vacant
Maribyrnong	Bill Shorten	Labor	Resignation	20 January 2025		Vacant	Vacant
