= Electoral results for the Division of Dunkley =

Results for Australian federal electoral division in south-east Melbourne, Victoria

This is a list of electoral results for the Division of Dunkley in Australian federal elections from the division's creation in 1984 until the present.

== Members ==
Member	Party	Term
Bob Chynoweth	Labor	1984–1990
Frank Ford	Liberal	1990–1993
Bob Chynoweth	Labor	1993–1996
Bruce Billson	Liberal	1996–2016
Chris Crewther	Liberal	2016–2019
Peta Murphy	Labor	2019–2023
Jodie Belyea	Labor	2024–present

== Election results ==
=== Elections in the 2020s ===
==== 2025 ====
2025 Australian federal election: Dunkley
Party	Candidate	Votes	%	±%
Liberal	Nathan Conroy			
Independent	Robert Thurley			
One Nation	Jessica Davis			
Family First	Peter Nicholes			
Greens	Matt Maber			
Fusion	Andrew Gatley			
Labor	Jodie Belyea			
Legalise Cannabis	Lisa Abbott			
Total formal votes				
Informal votes				
Turnout				

==== 2024 by-election ====
2024 Dunkley by-election
Party	Candidate	Votes	%	±%
Labor	Jodie Belyea	37,418	41.07	+0.84
Liberal	Nathan Conroy	35,746	39.23	+6.73
Greens	Alex Breskin	5,798	6.36	−3.98
Independent	Darren Bergwerf	4,315	4.74	+0.87
Animal Justice	Bronwyn Currie	2,818	3.09	+0.99
Libertarian	Chrysten Abraham	2,246	2.47	−0.04
Victorian Socialists	Reem Yunis	1,529	1.68	+1.68
Democrats	Heath McKenzie	1,242	1.36	+1.36
Total formal votes		91,112	95.86	+0.59
Informal votes		3,930	4.14	−0.59
Turnout		95,042	83.79	−6.27
Two-party-preferred result
Labor	Jodie Belyea	48,019	52.70	−3.57
Liberal	Nathan Conroy	43,093	47.30	+3.57
Labor hold		Swing	−3.57	

==== 2022 ====
2022 Australian federal election: Dunkley
Party	Candidate	Votes	%	±%
Labor	Peta Murphy	38,506	40.23	+1.71
Liberal	Sharn Coombes	31,108	32.50	−7.38
Greens	Liam O'Brien	9,898	10.34	+1.95
United Australia	Adrian Irvine	4,846	5.06	+2.46
Independent	Darren Bergwerf	3,698	3.86	+3.86
One Nation	Scott Middlebrook	2,689	2.81	+2.81
Liberal Democrats	Damian Willis	2,398	2.51	+2.51
Animal Justice	Elizabeth Johnston	2,013	2.10	−0.96
Federation	Kathryn Woods	566	0.59	+0.59
Total formal votes		95,722	95.27	+0.41
Informal votes		4,750	4.73	−0.41
Turnout		100,472	90.06	−2.30
Two-party-preferred result
Labor	Peta Murphy	53,865	56.27	+3.53
Liberal	Sharn Coombes	41,857	43.73	−3.53
Labor hold		Swing	+3.53	

Alluvial diagram for preference flows in the seat of Dunkley in the 2022 federal election. indicates at what stage the winning candidate had over 50% of the votes and was declared the winner.

=== Elections in the 2010s ===
==== 2019 ====
2019 Australian federal election: Dunkley
Party	Candidate	Votes	%	±%
Liberal	Chris Crewther	38,616	39.88	−1.22
Labor	Peta Murphy	37,301	38.52	+2.00
Greens	Emily Green	8,125	8.39	−1.09
Justice	Lachlan O'Connell	5,027	5.19	+0.19
Animal Justice	Elizabeth Johnston	2,961	3.06	+0.18
United Australia	Ron Jean	2,513	2.60	+2.60
Conservative National	Christopher James	1,337	1.38	+1.38
Rise Up Australia	Yvonne Gentle	948	0.98	+0.34
Total formal votes		96,828	94.86	+0.90
Informal votes		5,250	5.14	−0.90
Turnout		102,078	92.26	+1.10
Two-party-preferred result
Labor	Peta Murphy	51,066	52.74	+1.71
Liberal	Chris Crewther	45,762	47.26	−1.71
Labor notional hold		Swing	+1.71	

As a result of the 2018 boundary redistribution, the Liberal-held seats of Corangamite and Dunkley became notionally marginal Labor seats.

==== 2016 ====
2016 Australian federal election: Dunkley
Party	Candidate	Votes	%	±%
Liberal	Chris Crewther	38,158	42.73	−6.02
Labor	Peta Murphy	29,620	33.17	+2.29
Greens	Jeanette Swain	8,616	9.65	+0.33
Justice	Ruth Stanfield	5,510	6.17	+6.17
Animal Justice	Tyson Jack	1,926	2.16	+2.16
Family First	Michael Rathbone	1,393	1.56	−0.35
Independent	Joseph Toscano	1,132	1.27	+1.27
Liberal Democrats	Tim Wilms	1,037	1.16	+1.16
Rise Up Australia	Lin Tregenza	682	0.76	+0.22
Christians	Jeff Reaney	677	0.76	+0.76
Arts	Sally Baillieu	542	0.61	+0.61
Total formal votes		89,293	93.56	−1.65
Informal votes		6,151	6.44	+1.65
Turnout		95,444	90.94	−2.35
Two-party-preferred result
Liberal	Chris Crewther	45,925	51.43	−4.14
Labor	Peta Murphy	43,368	48.57	+4.14
Liberal hold		Swing	−4.14	

==== 2013 ====
2013 Australian federal election: Dunkley
Party	Candidate	Votes	%	±%
Liberal	Bruce Billson	42,869	48.75	+1.42
Labor	Sonya Kilkenny	27,155	30.88	−7.44
Greens	Simon Tiller	8,199	9.32	−2.37
Palmer United	Kate Ryder	3,707	4.22	+4.22
Sex Party	Eloise Palmi	2,589	2.94	+2.94
Family First	Cameron Eastman	1,682	1.91	−0.75
Independent	Rod Burt	740	0.84	+0.84
Independent	Roy Broff	516	0.59	+0.59
Rise Up Australia	Yvonne Gentle	477	0.54	+0.54
Total formal votes		87,934	95.21	−0.87
Informal votes		4,424	4.79	+0.87
Turnout		92,358	93.28	−0.32
Two-party-preferred result
Liberal	Bruce Billson	48,861	55.57	+4.53
Labor	Sonya Kilkenny	39,073	44.43	−4.53
Liberal hold		Swing	+4.53	

==== 2010 ====
2010 Australian federal election: Dunkley
Party	Candidate	Votes	%	±%
Liberal	Bruce Billson	40,602	47.32	−2.47
Labor	Helen Constas	32,889	38.33	+0.07
Greens	Simon Tiller	10,033	11.69	+3.94
Family First	Yasmin de Zilwa	2,276	2.65	+0.06
Total formal votes		85,800	96.08	−1.30
Informal votes		3,498	3.92	+1.30
Turnout		89,298	93.68	−1.55
Two-party-preferred result
Liberal	Bruce Billson	43,777	51.02	−3.02
Labor	Helen Constas	42,023	48.98	+3.02
Liberal hold		Swing	−3.02	

=== Elections in the 2000s ===
==== 2007 ====
2007 Australian federal election: Dunkley
Party	Candidate	Votes	%	±%
Liberal	Bruce Billson	43,024	49.79	−5.75
Labor	Graham McBride	33,055	38.26	+4.69
Greens	Neale Adams	6,695	7.75	+1.51
Family First	Steven Ashdown	2,235	2.59	+0.24
Democrats	Karen Bailey	1,395	1.61	+0.39
Total formal votes		86,404	97.38	+1.29
Informal votes		2,328	2.62	−1.29
Turnout		88,732	95.24	+0.16
Two-party-preferred result
Liberal	Bruce Billson	46,693	54.04	−5.34
Labor	Graham McBride	39,711	45.96	+5.34
Liberal hold		Swing	−5.34	

==== 2004 ====
2004 Australian federal election: Dunkley
Party	Candidate	Votes	%	±%
Liberal	Bruce Billson	46,067	55.54	+5.81
Labor	Helen Constas	27,845	33.57	−2.38
Greens	Paula Johnson	5,179	6.24	+0.62
Family First	Cameron Eastman	1,949	2.35	+2.35
Democrats	Karen Bailey	1,008	1.22	−4.31
Independent	Fletcher Davis	722	0.87	−0.32
Citizens Electoral Council	Gabrielle M Peut	178	0.21	+0.20
Total formal votes		82,948	96.09	−0.43
Informal votes		3,376	3.91	+0.43
Turnout		86,324	95.08	−0.52
Two-party-preferred result
Liberal	Bruce Billson	49,253	59.38	+4.16
Labor	Helen Constas	33,695	40.62	−4.16
Liberal hold		Swing	+4.16	

==== 2001 ====
2001 Australian federal election: Dunkley
Party	Candidate	Votes	%	±%
Liberal	Bruce Billson	39,203	49.90	+3.66
Labor	Mark Conroy	28,088	35.75	−3.23
Greens	Henry Kelsall	4,486	5.71	+1.82
Democrats	Ian Woodhouse	4,350	5.54	−0.22
One Nation	Michael Cartwright	1,438	1.83	−2.62
Independent	Fletcher Davis	995	1.27	+1.27
Total formal votes		78,560	96.55	−0.57
Informal votes		2,805	3.45	+0.57
Turnout		81,365	96.27	
Two-party-preferred result
Liberal	Bruce Billson	43,537	55.42	+3.88
Labor	Mark Conroy	35,023	44.58	−3.88
Liberal hold		Swing	+3.88	

=== Elections in the 1990s ===
==== 1998 ====
1998 Australian federal election: Dunkley
Party	Candidate	Votes	%	±%
Liberal	Bruce Billson	35,297	46.24	−2.18
Labor	Michael Quayle	29,755	38.98	−1.12
Democrats	Tony Seals	4,392	5.75	−1.25
One Nation	Robyn Brown	3,399	4.45	+4.45
Greens	Henry Kelsall	2,971	3.89	+1.47
Unity	Jan Chapman Davis	335	0.44	+0.44
Natural Law	Ben Mason	185	0.24	−0.29
Total formal votes		76,334	97.12	−0.39
Informal votes		2,264	2.88	+0.39
Turnout		78,598	96.03	−0.39
Two-party-preferred result
Liberal	Bruce Billson	39,721	52.04	−1.32
Labor	Michael Quayle	36,613	47.96	+1.32
Liberal hold		Swing	−1.32	

==== 1996 ====
1996 Australian federal election: Dunkley
Party	Candidate	Votes	%	±%
Liberal	Bruce Billson	36,330	48.42	−1.04
Labor	Bob Chynoweth	30,084	40.10	−3.59
Democrats	Reba Jacobs	5,257	7.01	+3.10
Greens	Paul Higgins	1,817	2.42	+2.42
Against Further Immigration	Travis Peak	1,144	1.52	+1.52
Natural Law	Bev Nelson	399	0.53	−2.18
Total formal votes		75,031	97.51	−0.26
Informal votes		1,914	2.49	+0.26
Turnout		76,945	96.42	+0.11
Two-party-preferred result
Liberal	Bruce Billson	39,885	53.36	+1.02
Labor	Bob Chynoweth	34,865	46.64	−1.02
Liberal notional hold		Swing	+1.02	

==== 1993 ====
1993 Australian federal election: Dunkley
Party	Candidate	Votes	%	±%
Labor	Bob Chynoweth	32,461	47.16	+9.52
Liberal	Frank Ford	31,621	45.94	+2.16
Democrats	Barrie Rowland-Hornblow	2,696	3.92	−9.32
Natural Law	Bev Nelson	2,056	2.99	+2.99
Total formal votes		68,834	97.75	+1.59
Informal votes		1,584	2.25	−1.59
Turnout		70,418	96.32	
Two-party-preferred result
Labor	Bob Chynoweth	34,813	50.61	+1.81
Liberal	Frank Ford	33,969	49.39	−1.81
Labor gain from Liberal		Swing	+1.81	

==== 1990 ====
1990 Australian federal election: Dunkley
Party	Candidate	Votes	%	±%
Liberal	Frank Ford	28,759	43.8	+5.1
Labor	Bob Chynoweth	24,724	37.6	−13.0
Democrats	Peter Lindemann	8,695	13.2	+6.9
Independent	Peter Seitanidis	1,458	2.2	+2.2
Pensioner	Keith Edwards	910	1.4	+1.4
Call to Australia	Arthur Comer	554	0.8	+0.8
Independent	Mike Toldy	297	0.5	+0.5
Independent	Len Cosmavich	294	0.4	+0.4
Total formal votes		65,691	96.2	+0.5
Informal votes		2,625	3.8	−0.5
Turnout		68,316	95.8	
Two-party-preferred result
Liberal	Frank Ford	33,582	51.2	+6.8
Labor	Bob Chynoweth	32,012	48.8	−6.8
Liberal gain from Labor		Swing	+6.8	

=== Elections in the 1980s ===
==== 1987 ====
1987 Australian federal election: Dunkley
Party	Candidate	Votes	%	±%
Labor	Bob Chynoweth	28,740	46.7	+0.3
Liberal	Tom Warwick	26,267	42.6	−1.1
Democrats	Robyn Kirby	3,881	6.3	+0.2
Independent	Chris van Lieshout	1,898	3.1	+3.1
Pensioner	Andrew Murray	615	1.0	+1.0
Independent	Les Johnson	193	0.3	+0.3
Total formal votes		61,594	95.6	+3.3
Informal votes		2,804	4.4	−3.3
Turnout		64,398	96.0	
Two-party-preferred result
Labor	Bob Chynoweth	31,837	51.7	+0.6
Liberal	Tom Warwick	29,723	48.3	−0.6
Labor hold		Swing	+0.6	

==== 1984 ====
1984 Australian federal election: Dunkley
Party	Candidate	Votes	%	±%
Labor	Bob Chynoweth	26,605	46.4	−2.5
Liberal	Leonie Clark	25,070	43.7	+1.7
Democrats	Grenville Charles	3,519	6.1	−0.4
National	Judy Hale	1,494	2.6	+2.6
Democratic Labor	John Cass	621	1.1	−1.1
Total formal votes		57,309	92.3	
Informal votes		4,749	7.7	
Turnout		62,058	95.3	
Two-party-preferred result
Labor	Bob Chynoweth	29,296	51.1	−2.1
Liberal	Leonie Clark	28,003	48.9	+2.1
Labor notional hold		Swing	−2.1	
