= 47th Parliament of Australia =

2022–2025 Australian legislative term

47th Parliament of the Commonwealth of Australia
- 46th ← → 48th
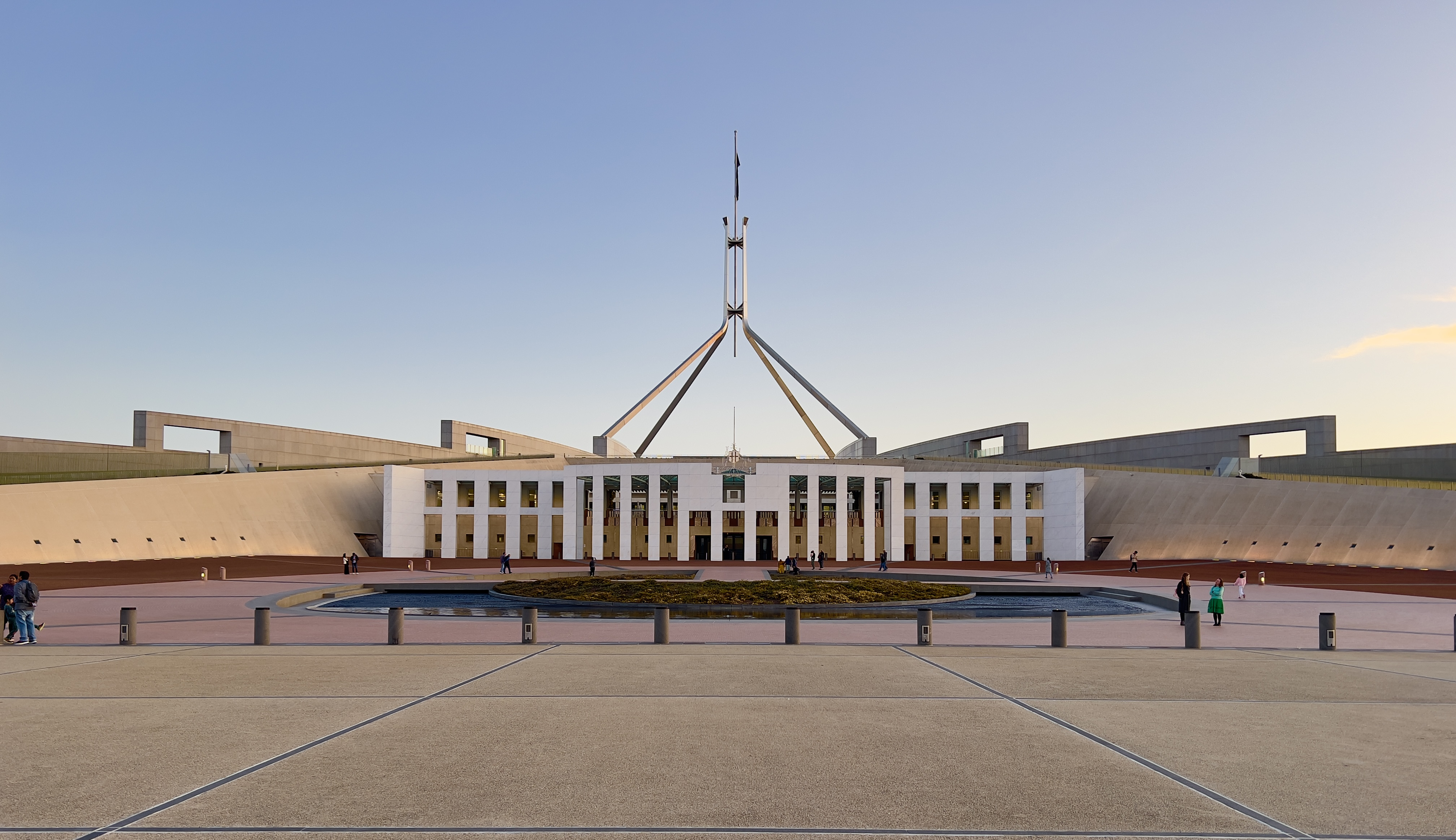
- Parliament House (2023) Parliament House (2023)

26 July 2022 – 28 March 2025
- Members: 76 senators 151 representatives
- Senate Leader: Penny Wong, Labor (from 23 May 2022)
- Senate President: Sue Lines, Labor (from 26 July 2022)
- House Leader: Tony Burke, Labor (from 1 June 2022)
- House Speaker: Milton Dick, Labor (from 26 July 2022)

Sessions
- 1st: 26 July 2022 – 28 March 2025 House Composition (at dissolution) Government (77): Labor (77); Opposition (53); Coalition: Liberal (39) (Note: Including 15 Liberal National Party of Queensland (LNP) MPs who sit in the Liberals party room); National (14) (Note: Including 5 Liberal National Party of Queensland (LNP) MPs who sit in the Nationals party room); Crossbench (19): Greens (4); Katter's Australian (1); Centre Alliance (1); Independent (13) (Note: Russell Broadbent; Kate Chaney; Zoe Daniel; Andrew Gee; Ian Goodenough; Helen Haines; Dai Le; Monique Ryan; Sophie Scamps; Allegra Spender; Zali Steggall; Kylea Tink; Andrew Wilkie); Vacant (2) (Note: Division of Hinkler and Division of Maribyrnong) Senate Composition (at dissolution) Government (25): Labor (25); Opposition (30); Coalition: Liberal (24) (Note: Including two Liberal National Party of Queensland (LNP) senators who sit in the Liberal party room.); National (6) (Note: Including two Liberal National Party of Queensland (LNP) senators and one Country Liberal Party senator who sit in the Nationals party room.); Crossbench (21): Greens (11); One Nation (2); Lambie Network (1); United Australia (1); Australia's Voice (1); People First (1); Independent (4) (Note: David Pocock, Tammy Tyrrell, Lidia Thorpe and David Van)

The 47th Parliament of Australia was a meeting of the legislative body of the Commonwealth of Australia, composed of the Australian Senate and the Australian House of Representatives. The May 2022 federal election gave the Australian Labor Party control of the House, with 77 seats, enough for a two-seat majority government. Labor gained an additional seat at the Aston by-election in April 2023, thereby increasing its majority to three seats for much of the remainder of the term. (Note: Bill Shorten, the Labor MP for Maribyrnong, resigned from his seat on 20 January 2025, leaving Labor with 77 seats for the remaining two months of the 47th parliament.) Following the election, Labor leader Anthony Albanese became the 31st Prime Minister of Australia, and was sworn in by the Governor-General David Hurley on 23 May 2022. The 47th Parliament opened in Canberra on 26 July 2022. The term ended on 28 March 2025, when the House of Representatives was dissolved and parliament was prorogued by Governor-General Sam Mostyn, in preparation for the 2025 federal election.

== Major events and legislation ==
- The Climate Change Act 2022 passed the parliament on 8 September 2022, having been approved by the House by 86 votes to 50 and the Senate by 37 votes to 30. The legislation codifies a 43 per cent emissions reduction target by 2030 (on 2005 levels), requires the Climate Change Authority to provide advice on Australia's progress against those targets, mandates that the Minister for Climate Change reports annually to Parliament on Australia's progress, and forces federal government agencies to adhere to the legislative requirements of the Act.
- The Social Security Amendment Act 2022 passed the parliament on 28 September 2022, having passed the House by 86 votes to 56 and the Senate by 33 votes to 26. The legislation repealed the mandatory Cashless Welfare Card, originally introduced as a trial in 2016 for 12,500 people across four trial sites, which quarantined around 80% of a person's income so it could not be spent on alcohol or gambling or withdrawn in cash. As a result of the legislative change, participants could opt out of the scheme, though around 4,300 people in the Northern Territory and Cape York remained on the card prior to the introduction of a compulsory income-management scheme in 2023.
- The Anti-Discrimination and Human Rights Legislation Amendment (Respect at Work) Act 2022 passed the parliament on 28 November 2022. The legislation implemented seven of the recommendations of the Kate Jenkins-authored Respect@Work report into sexual harassment. Among other reforms, the laws impose a positive onus on employers to take steps to demonstrate that they're proactively attempting to eliminate sex discrimination "as far as possible". In addition, victimising conduct can be the basis of a civil, not just criminal, complaint, and public sector agencies are newly required to report to the Workplace Gender Equality Agency as occurs with private sector agencies.
- The National Anti-Corruption Commission Act 2022 passed the parliament on 30 November 2022. The legislation established the National Anti-Corruption Commission, an independent federal agency equipped with the power to investigate Commonwealth ministers, public servants, statutory office holders, government agencies, parliamentarians and parliamentary staff for corrupt or improper behaviour.
- The Fair Work Legislation Amendment Act 2022 passed the parliament on 2 December 2022. The legislation passed the House of Representatives by 80 votes to 56 and passed the Senate by 35 votes to 31. The workplace relations reforms introduce multi-employer bargaining, allow the Fair Work Commission to authorise workers with sufficient common interests to bargain together and abolish the Australian Building and Construction Commission and Registered Organisations Commission. The legislation passed with the support of the Greens and Senator David Pocock, who each won government support for an enforceable right to request unpaid parental leave and measures to prevent a loophole in the better-off-overall test in the legislation, as well as the creation of a statutory advisory committee of experts to provide independent advice concerning "economic inclusion" of lower-income people, welfare recipients and cost-of-living relief.
- The Restoring Territory Rights Act 2022 passed the parliament on 1 December 2022. The legislation, which abolished the federal ban on the Northern Territory and Australian Capital Territory legislatures passing laws to permit euthanasia schemes (originally passed in 1997) was subject to a conscience vote for most parties. It was approved by 99 votes to 37 in the House of Representatives and by 41 votes to 25 in the Senate.
- In January 2023 the government began partnering with states and territories to provide approximately 500,000 fee-free TAFE places in vocational education settings for priority groups, at an overall cost of approximately $1.5 billion over three years. This was supplemented by the Free TAFE Bill which was introduced to the parliament in November 2024 and eventually passed in March 2025, which provided permanent and ongoing financial support to the states and territories for the delivery of 100,000 fee-free places per year. The legislation was supported by Labor, the Greens and some crossbenchers, and opposed by the Liberal/National opposition, One Nation and other crossbenchers.
- The Safeguard Mechanism (Crediting) Amendment Act 2023 passed the parliament on 30 March 2023. The legislation passed with the support of the Labor government, the Greens, Jacqui Lambie Network and independent crossbenchers in both chambers, following intense negotiations between the parties. In effect, 215 of the country's major polluting facilities are required to cut emissions intensity by 5% a year, through absolute cuts or by buying carbon offsets. While individual companies can buy an unlimited number of offsets, total absolute emissions under the scheme cannot increase and are required to come down over time. The legislation passed the Senate by 32 votes to 26 and the House by 89 votes to 50, with the Liberal/National Coalition, One Nation and United Australia parties opposed to the reforms.
- The Constitution Alteration (Aboriginal and Torres Strait Islander Voice) 2023 proposed alteration to the Constitution of Australia passed the parliament on 19 June 2023. It passed by 121 votes to 25 in the House of Representatives and by 52 votes to 19 in the Senate. It enabled a referendum to occur in the latter months of 2023, to establish an Aboriginal and Torres Strait Islander Voice, which would have an advisory power to consult with the parliament and Executive Government on matters and legislation affecting Indigenous Australians.
- The Housing Australia Future Fund Bill 2023 passed the parliament on 14 September 2023. The legislation established the Housing Australia Future Fund, a $10 billion sovereign wealth fund-type scheme to enable the construction of 30,000 social and affordable homes over five years. A guaranteed $500 million is to be spent per year from the fund, while a minimum of 1,200 homes are to be built in each state and territory across the period. The legislation's passage was achieved after the government won the support of the Greens, who negotiated an extra $1 billion for public and community housing from the government, though failed to win support for a national freeze or caps on rents. Several months prior to the legislation's passage, the government made a $2 billion separate one-off announcement for social housing through a "social housing accelerator" scheme.
- In January 2024, Prime Minister Anthony Albanese announced the government had approved changes to the Stage 3 income tax cuts, originally passed by the Morrison government during the 46th Parliament and set to come into effect on 1 July 2024. Under the new scheme, the flattening of the tax rate for all income between $45,000 and $200,000 to 30% will be overturned through the restoration of the 37% tax rate, income earners above $150,000 will have their tax cuts progressively reduced to as much as half of the original cut, whilst earners up to $150,000 will have a larger cut than proposed under the previous government. To this effect, the Treasury Laws Amendment (Cost of Living Tax Cuts) Bill 2024 was approved by the parliament on 27 February 2024.
- On the final sitting day before the 2024 winter parliamentary break, the Albanese Government experienced its first legislative defeat in the 47th Parliament when a proposed Defence Amendment Bill was voted down in the Senate. The bill aimed to establish a parliamentary committee with broad investigative powers into Defence spending, but was rejected due to opposition from both government and coalition members, who resisted including cross-bench representation. Greens Senator David Shoebridge criticized the persistent issues with Defence procurement, citing significant failures and cost overruns in submarine, frigate, and offshore patrol vessel projects. The bill's defeat left Defence's extensive budget and procurement practices with minimal oversight, highlighting ongoing concerns about accountability and management within the department.
- In August 2024, the parliament passed the National Disability Insurance Scheme Amendment Act 2024, which made significant changes to the National Disability Insurance Scheme, altering the way participants receive plan budgets and giving more powers to the head of the agency in charge of the scheme to prevent top-up payments on a participant's budget. The reforms curb the growth rate of funding for the scheme, resulting in $14.4 billion in savings over four years, and were achieved after receiving the support of the state and territory governments, who co-govern the scheme in conjunction with the federal government. These changes attracted criticism from disability rights advocates and Greens spokesperson Jordon Steele-John, who accused Labor of "ripp[ing] the heart out of the NDIS by removing our right to choice and control".
- Also in August 2024, the parliament passed the Fair Work (Registered Organisations) Amendment (Administration) Act 2024, which placed the construction divisions of the Construction, Forestry and Maritime Employees Union (CFMEU) into administration. Under the legislation, the CFMEU's construction division will be placed into administration for a minimum of three years, after reports of the division being infiltrated by organised criminal enterprises. The legislation was supported by Labor, the Coalition and some crossbenchers, and was opposed by the Greens. It passed the Senate by 47 votes to 10 and passed the House without a division called for on the third reading.
- Regulatory changes to visa fees for international university students were adopted on 1 July 2024, via the Migration Amendment (Visa Application Charges) Regulations 2024. The non-refundable fee for a student visa increased from $710 AUD to $1600 AUD, making Australia's visa fees among the highest in the developed world. The changes were subject to a disallowance motion in the Senate on 14 August, which was defeated 26 votes to 12. Accompanying changes to temporary graduate work visa (subclass 485) applicants reduced the maximum age for applicants from 50 to 35 years of age and reduced the post-study right to stay and find work for nationals of most countries except Hong Kong and British National Overseas passport holders, attracting criticism for unequal treatment and the potential of a disincentive being created for specialist masters and PhD candidates to study and work in Australia.
- On 7 November 2024, Albanese announced rules to ban children under 16 from accessing social media. Under the legislation, "age-restricted social media platforms" include TikTok, Facebook, Snapchat, Instagram, X and Reddit. Under 16's would be able to view YouTube in a logged-out state. The legislation, introduced two weeks after Albanese's announcement, places the onus on the platforms to create systems and processes to ensure under-16's are not creating accounts, and adopts a "reasonable steps" test for this purpose, though does not specify exactly how the platforms must comply with the obligation. Platforms would face fines of up to $50 million where there were "systematic" issues of multiple users being able to circumvent the age verification protocols. The Online Safety Amendment (Social Media Minimum Age) Bill 2024 passed the House by 102 votes to 13, winning support of Labor, the Coalition and four independents, and was opposed by the Greens and eight other crossbenchers. The bill passed the Senate by 34 votes to 19, being opposed by the Greens, six other crossbenchers, and two Coalition senators (Matt Canavan and Alex Antic) who crossed the floor.
- Further housing-related bills were before the parliament throughout 2024, namely the government's "Help to Buy" and "Build to Rent" bills. The bills allow up to 40,000 first home buyers to co-purchase homes with the government and offer a tax incentive for apartment complexes designed for renters. The legislation was opposed by the Coalition, and so for much of the year Labor and the Greens negotiated the bill's passage. The Greens initially refused to offer support the bills unless they were accompanied by the winding down of negative gearing on properties, rent caps and additional guaranteed funding for social housing, though in November 2024 the party announced they would back the bills unaltered, with party spokesperson Max Chandler-Mather saying "at the end of the day, if the government doesn't care about [renters] then it's up to them, but you can't accuse us of not trying".
- The Universities Accord (Student Support and Other Measures) Bill 2024 passed the parliament on 26 November 2024. The legislation reversed the large indexation increases that applied to HECS-HELP fees over the previous two years (2023 and 2024) as a result of high inflation. Indexation rates will now be pegged to whichever of the Wage Price Index or Consumer Price Index is lower. In addition the bill established the Commonwealth Prac Placement, proving grants for students undertaking mandatory placements in teaching, nursing and midwifery, and social work courses. The legislation passed amidst Labor announcing it would cut the student debts of all Australians by 20% if the party won the 2025 election. The Greens attempted to include these changes as amendments to the Universities Accord Bill, though these were voted down by Labor and the Coalition.
- The Electoral Legislation Amendment (Electoral Reform) Bill 2025 passed the parliament on 13 February 2025. The legislation made the most significant reforms to electoral funding laws in decades. The public disclosure threshold for individual donations was lowered from $16,000 to $5,000, whilst real-time disclosure of donations was enabled for the first time. Political parties are limited to spending $90 million during campaigns, whilst independent MPs and candidates can spend up to $800,000 in their electorates. Public funding per vote increases from $3.50 a vote to $5 for candidates who earn above 4% of the vote in an electorate. Following extensive negotiation, the legislation was supported by the Labor government and Liberal/National opposition, however almost all minor parties and independent MPs on the crossbench vociferously opposed the reforms, arguing they favoured the major parties and disadvantaged non-major party affiliated individuals from running for and winning seats.
- The Treasury Laws Amendment Bill 2025 passed the parliament on 26 March 2025. The legislation gave effect to the government's lead policy of the 2025 federal budget, namely to reduce the income tax rate from 16% to 14% for the lowest income tax bracket (for income between $18,201 and $45,000) over the following two years. The cuts were opposed by the Liberal/National opposition, who labelled them an "election bribe" and "cruel hoax". The legislation was fast-tracked by the government and passed the parliament in one sitting day, attracting the support of the Greens and most other crossbenchers in both the House (91 votes in favor to 52 against) and Senate (38 votes to 26).
- The Environment Protection and Biodiversity Conservation Amendment (Reconsiderations) Bill 2025 passed the parliament on 26 March 2025. The legislation sought to protect the Tasmanian salmon farming industry by ending a formal reconsideration by the environment minister into whether an expansion of fish farming in Macquarie Harbour in 2012 was properly approved. The legislation came amidst increased public awareness into the endangered Maugean skate population in the harbour and a bacterial outbreak and mass die-off event of salmon in Tasmania's south-east. The government argued the legislation would protect local jobs in salmon farming but opponents argued it risked stymying groups from challenging other non-salmon related environmental approvals and would contribute to environmental degradation in the region. The legislation passed the House of Representatives by 111 votes to 14 and passed the Senate by 30 votes to 14, being supported by the government and opposition and opposed by the Greens and most crossbenchers in both chambers.

== Parliamentary conduct ==
By January 2024, there had been 118 instances of MPs being ejected from the House of Representatives during Question Time, with 93% of these ejections involving male MPs. Notable frequent offenders include Coalition spokesperson Michael Sukkar and Liberal backbencher Tony Pasin. The Albanese government, despite its commitment to improving parliamentary conduct, delayed the establishment of an Independent Parliamentary Standards Commission (IPSC) to address such issues until at least October 2024, as stated by Public Service Minister Katy Gallagher.

== Leadership ==
=== Senate ===
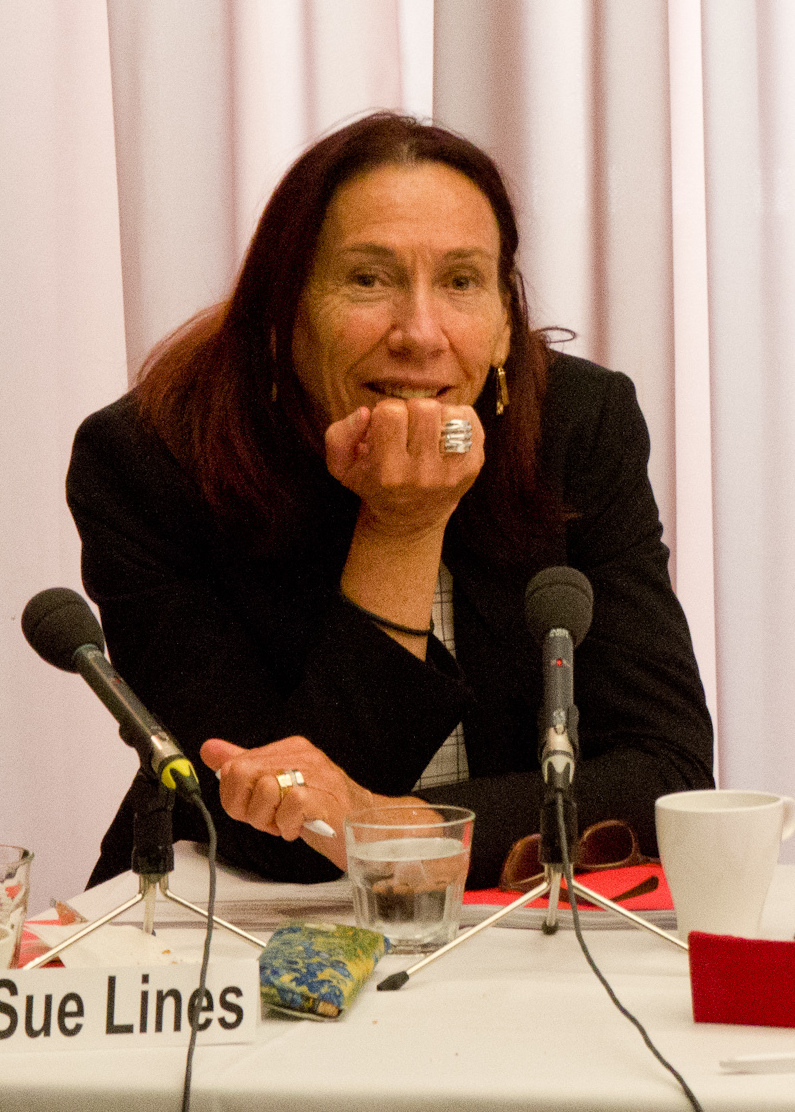
Senate President Sue Lines (ALP)

Senate President election
Candidate	State	Votes	%
Sue Lines	Western Australia	54	81.82
Dorinda Cox	Western Australia	12	18.18
		66	100

==== Presiding officer ====
- President of the Senate: Sue Lines

==== Government leadership ====
- Leader of the Government: Penny Wong
- Deputy Leader of the Government: Don Farrell
- Chief Government Whip: Anne Urquhart
- Deputy Government Whips: Raff Ciccone & Louise Pratt
- Manager of Government Business: Katy Gallagher

==== Opposition leadership ====
- Leader of the Opposition: Simon Birmingham (until January 2025), Michaelia Cash (from January 2025)
- Deputy Leader of the Opposition: Michaelia Cash (until January 2025), Anne Ruston (from January 2025)
- Chief Opposition Whip: Wendy Askew
- Deputy Opposition Whips: Paul Scarr & Matt O'Sullivan
- Manager of Opposition Business: Anne Ruston (until January 2025), Jonathon Duniam (from January 2025)

=== House of Representatives ===
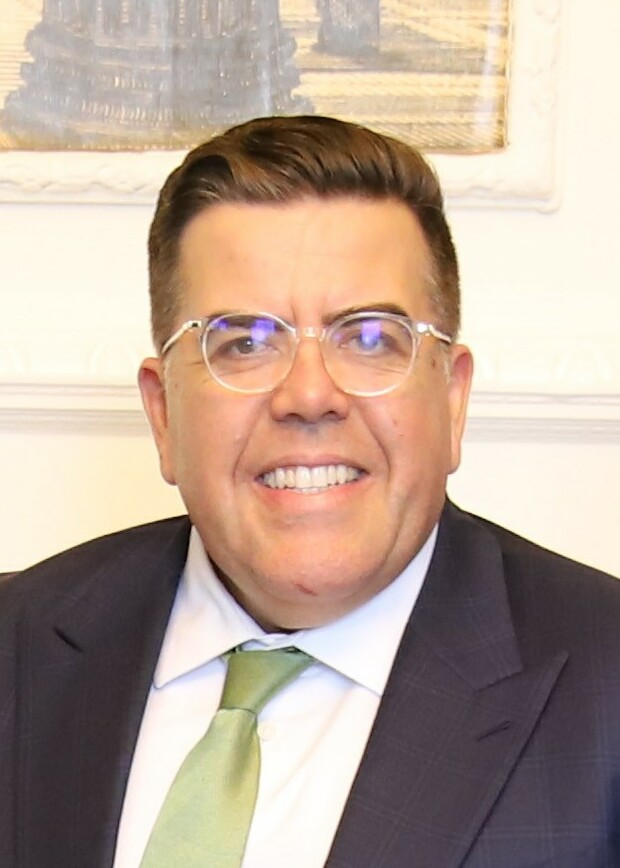
House Speaker Milton Dick (ALP)

House of Representatives Speaker election
Candidate	Seat	Votes	%
Milton Dick	Oxley (Qld)	92	62.16
Andrew Wallace	Fisher (Qld)	56	37.84
		148	100

==== Presiding officer ====
- Speaker of the House: Milton Dick

==== Government leadership ====
- Leader of the House: Tony Burke
- Chief Government Whip: Joanne Ryan
- Government Whips: Anne Stanley & David Smith

==== Opposition leadership ====
- Manager of Opposition Business: Paul Fletcher (until January 2025), Michael Sukkar (from January 2025)
- Chief Opposition Whip: Bert van Manen
- Opposition Whips: Melissa Price & Rowan Ramsey

== Party summary ==
=== House of Representatives ===
House membership (as of 14 November 2023) 4 Australian Greens Katter's Australian Party 1 78 Australian Labor Party National Party of Australia 9 Liberal National Party 21 Liberal Party of Australia 25 12 Independent 1 Centre Alliance

Affiliation	Party (shading shows control)								Total	Vacant
Affiliation	GRN	ALP	IND	CA	LPA	NPA	KAP	UAP	Total	Vacant
End of previous Parliament	1	68	4	1	60	15	1	1	151	0
Begin (26 July 2022)	4	77	10	1	42	16	1	—	151	0
23 December 2022 (Note: Andrew Gee, MP for Calare, resigned from the National Party on 23 December 2022 and began sitting as an independent.)	4	77	11	1	42	15	1	—	151	0
17 February 2023 (Note: Alan Tudge, Liberal MP for Aston, resigned on 17 February 2023. The resulting by-election was won by Labor candidate Mary Doyle on 1 April 2023.)	4	77	11	1	41	15	1	—	150	1
1 April 2023	4	78	11	1	41	15	1	—	151	0
18 May 2023 (Note: Stuart Robert, Liberal National MP for Fadden, resigned on 18 May 2023. The resulting by-election was won by Liberal National candidate Cameron Caldwell on 15 July 2023.)	4	78	11	1	40	15	1	—	150	1
15 July 2023	4	78	11	1	41	15	1	—	151	0
14 November 2023 (Note: Russell Broadbent, MP for Monash, resigned from the Liberal Party on 14 November 2023 and moved to the crossbench to sit as an independent.)	4	78	12	1	40	15	1	—	151	0
4 December 2023 (Note: Peta Murphy, Labor MP for Dunkley, died in office on 4 December 2023. The resulting by-election was won by Labor candidate Jodie Belyea on 2 March 2024.)	4	77	12	1	40	15	1	—	150	1
28 February 2024 (Note: Scott Morrison, Liberal MP for Cook, resigned on 28 February 2024. The resulting by-election was won by Liberal candidate Simon Kennedy on 13 April 2024.)	4	77	12	1	39	15	1	—	149	2
2 March 2024	4	78	12	1	39	15	1	—	150	1
13 April 2024	4	78	12	1	40	15	1	—	151	0
12 January 2025 (Note: Ian Goodenough, Liberal MP for Moore, had his party membership lapse on 12 January 2025. Consequently he sat as an independent MP for the remainder of his term.)	4	78	13	1	39	15	1	—	151	0
19 January 2025 (Note: Keith Pitt, Liberal National MP for Hinkler, resigned on 19 January 2025. No by-election was held as the resignation occurred sufficiently close enough to the federal election.)	4	78	13	1	39	14	1	—	150	1
20 January 2025 (Note: Bill Shorten, Labor MP for Maribyrnong, resigned on 20 January 2025. No by-election was held as the resignation occurred sufficiently close enough to the federal election.)	4	77	13	1	39	14	1	—	149	2
Latest voting share %	2.65	50.99	8.61	0.66	35.10		0.66	—		

=== Senate ===
Senate membership (as of 17 June 2023) 11 Australian Greens Pauline Hanson's One Nation 2 26 Australian Labor Party United Australia Party 1 Country Liberal Party 1 Liberal National Party of Queensland 5 Liberal/National joint ticket 10 Liberal Party of Australia 15 3 Independent 2 Jacqui Lambie Network

Affiliation	Party (shading shows control)													Total	Vacant
Affiliation	GRN	ALP	IND	CA	REX	JLN	LPA	NPA	LDP	ON	UAP	PFP	AV	Total	Vacant
End of previous Parliament	9	26	—	1	1	1	31	4	1	2	—	—	—	76	0
Begin (26 July 2022)	12	26	1	—		2	26	6	—	2	1	—	—	76	0
16 January 2023 (Note: Jim Molan, Liberal senator for New South Wales, died in office on 16 January 2023. His successor, Maria Kovacic, was appointed as his replacement on 31 May 2023.)	12	26	1	—		2	25	6	—	2	1	—	—	75	1
6 February 2023 (Note: Lidia Thorpe, senator for Victoria, resigned from the Greens on 6 February 2023 to sit as an independent.)	11	26	2	—		2	25	6	—	2	1	—	—	75	1
31 May 2023	11	26	2	—		2	26	6	—	2	1	—	—	76	0
17 June 2023 (Note: David Van, senator for Victoria, resigned from the Liberal Party on 17 June 2023 to sit as an independent.)	11	26	3	—		2	25	6	—	2	1	—	—	76	0
30 September 2023 (Note: Marise Payne, Liberal senator for New South Wales, resigned on 30 September 2023. Her successor, Dave Sharma, was appointed as her replacement on 30 November 2023.)	11	26	3	—		2	24	6	—	2	1	—	—	75	1
30 November 2023	11	26	3	—		2	25	6	—	2	1	—	—	76	0
26 January 2024 (Note: Pat Dodson, Labor senator for Western Australia, resigned on 26 January 2024. His successor, Varun Ghosh, was appointed as his replacement on 1 February 2024.)	11	25	3	—		2	25	6	—	2	1	—	—	75	1
1 February 2024	11	26	3	—		2	25	6	—	2	1	—	—	76	0
29 February 2024 (Note: Linda White, Labor senator for Victoria, died in office on 29 February 2024. Her successor, Lisa Darmanin, was appointed as her replacement on 29 May 2024.)	11	25	3	—		2	25	6	—	2	1	—	—	75	1
28 March 2024 (Note: Tammy Tyrrell, senator for Tasmania, resigned from the Jacqui Lambie Network on 28 March 2024 to sit as an independent.)	11	25	4	—		1	25	6	—	2	1	—	—	75	1
19 April 2024 (Note: Janet Rice, Greens senator for Victoria, resigned on 19 April 2024. Her successor, Steph Hodgins-May, was appointed as her replacement on 1 May 2024.)	10	25	4	—		1	25	6	—	2	1	—	—	74	2
1 May 2024	11	25	4	—		1	25	6	—	2	1	—	—	75	1
29 May 2024	11	26	4	—		1	25	6	—	2	1	—	—	76	0
4 July 2024 (Note: Fatima Payman, senator for Western Australia, resigned from Labor on 4 July 2024 to sit as an independent. Payman created a new party, Australia's Voice, which was registered on 17 December 2024.)	11	25	5	—		1	25	6	—	2	1	—	—	76	0
25 August 2024 (Note: Gerard Rennick, senator for Queensland, resigned from the Liberal Party on 25 August 2024 to sit as an independent. Rennick created a new party, the People First Party, which was registered on 5 December 2024.)	11	25	6	—		1	24	6	—	2	1	—	—	76	0
5 December 2024	11	25	5	—		1	24	6	—	2	1	1	—	76	0
17 December 2024	11	25	4	—		1	24	6	—	2	1	1	1	76	0
28 January 2025 (Note: Simon Birmingham, Liberal senator for South Australia, resigned on 28 January 2025. His successor, Leah Blyth, was appointed as his replacement on 6 February 2025.)	11	25	4	—		1	23	6	—	2	1	1	1	75	1
6 February 2025	11	25	4	—		1	24	6	—	2	1	1	1	76	0
Latest voting share %	14.47	32.89	5.26	—		1.32	39.47		—	2.63	1.32	1.32	1.32		

== Demographics ==
The 47th Parliament of Australia had a historically high representation of women; women made up 38% of the House of Representatives and 57% of the Senate, the highest on record for both chambers. In terms of representation, Indigenous members accounted for 9.6 per cent of the 76 Senate seats, and 1.9 per cent of 151 House of Representatives seats.

Despite these advancements, Parliament did not fully mirror the Australian population. Women, who held a slight majority in the general population, were still underrepresented in Parliament. The average age of MPs was higher than the national median of 38. Representation of culturally diverse backgrounds was also limited, with only 6.6% of MPs having non-European ancestry compared to 23% of the general population, and 4.4% of MPs having Asian heritage versus 18% of Australians. Indigenous representation had increased, with eight Indigenous senators and three Indigenous MPs, totaling 4.8% of the Parliament, which was higher than the Indigenous population percentage of 3.3%. Despite these advances, Australia's parliamentary representation continued to lag behind countries such as Canada and New Zealand in terms of gender and cultural diversity.

The Liberal Party's representation of women had declined, with only 9 seats compared to 13 in the previous parliament. In contrast, Prime Minister Anthony Albanese's cabinet was the most diverse in Australian history, featuring 10 women out of 23 cabinet ministers, with several holding prominent positions such as Penny Wong in foreign affairs and Linda Burney as the first female Indigenous cabinet minister.

=== Senate ===
The Senate included 32 men and 44 women, the most women to date.

=== House of Representatives ===
There were 58 women in the House, the largest number in history, with 19 of these being first-term Members of Parliament (MPs). Three members were LGBTQ+; Stephen Bates, Angie Bell and Julian Hill. Four members; Mark Dreyfus, Josh Burns, Mike Freelander and Julian Leeser identified as Jewish. Labor members Ed Husic and Anne Aly became the first two Muslim federal ministers.

== Membership ==
=== Senate ===
40 of the 76 seats in the upper house were contested in the election in May 2022. The class of senators elected in 2022 are denoted with an asterisk (*).

==== Australian Capital Territory ====
▌ Katy Gallagher (ALP)*
▌ David Pocock (IND)*

==== New South Wales ====
▌ Tim Ayres (ALP)
▌ Andrew Bragg (LP)
▌ Ross Cadell (NAT)*
▌ Perin Davey (NAT)
▌ Mehreen Faruqi (AG)
▌ Hollie Hughes (LP)
▌ Jenny McAllister (ALP)*
▌ Maria Kovacic (LP)*
▌ Deborah O'Neill (ALP)*
▌ Dave Sharma (LP)*
▌ Tony Sheldon (ALP)
▌ David Shoebridge (AG)*

==== Northern Territory ====
▌ Malarndirri McCarthy (ALP)*
▌ Jacinta Price (CLP)*

==== Queensland ====
▌ Penny Allman-Payne (AG)*
▌ Matt Canavan (LNP)*
▌ Anthony Chisholm (ALP)*
▌ Nita Green (ALP)
▌ Pauline Hanson (PHON)*
▌ Susan McDonald (LNP)
▌ James McGrath (LNP)*
▌ Gerard Rennick (PFP)
▌ Malcolm Roberts (PHON)
▌ Paul Scarr (LNP)
▌ Larissa Waters (AG)
▌ Murray Watt (ALP)*

==== South Australia ====
▌ Alex Antic (LP)
▌ Leah Blyth (LP)*
▌ Don Farrell (ALP)*
▌ David Fawcett (LP)
▌ Karen Grogan (ALP)
▌ Sarah Hanson-Young (AG)
▌ Kerrynne Liddle (LP)*
▌ Andrew McLachlan (LP)*
▌ Barbara Pocock (AG)*
▌ Anne Ruston (LP)
▌ Marielle Smith (ALP)
▌ Penny Wong (ALP)*

==== Tasmania ====
▌ Wendy Askew (LP)*
▌ Catryna Bilyk (ALP)
▌ Carol Brown (ALP)
▌ Claire Chandler (LP)
▌ Richard Colbeck (LP)
▌ Jonathon Duniam (LP)*
▌ Jacqui Lambie (JLN)
▌ Nick McKim (AG)
▌ Helen Polley (ALP)*
▌ Tammy Tyrrell (IND)*
▌ Anne Urquhart (ALP)*
▌ Peter Whish-Wilson (AG)*

==== Victoria ====
▌ Ralph Babet (UAP)*
▌ Raff Ciccone (ALP)
▌ Lisa Darmanin (ALP)*
▌ Sarah Henderson (LP)*
▌ Steph Hodgins-May (AG)
▌ Jane Hume (LP)
▌ Bridget McKenzie (NAT)*
▌ James Paterson (LP)
▌ Jana Stewart (ALP)*
▌ Lidia Thorpe (IND)*
▌ David Van (IND)
▌ Jess Walsh (ALP)

==== Western Australia ====
▌ Slade Brockman (LP)
▌ Michaelia Cash (LP)*
▌ Dorinda Cox (AG)*
▌ Varun Ghosh (ALP)
▌ Sue Lines (ALP)*
▌ Matt O'Sullivan (LP)
▌ Fatima Payman (AV)*
▌ Louise Pratt (ALP)
▌ Linda Reynolds (LP)
▌ Dean Smith (LP)*
▌ Jordon Steele-John (AG)
▌ Glenn Sterle (ALP)*

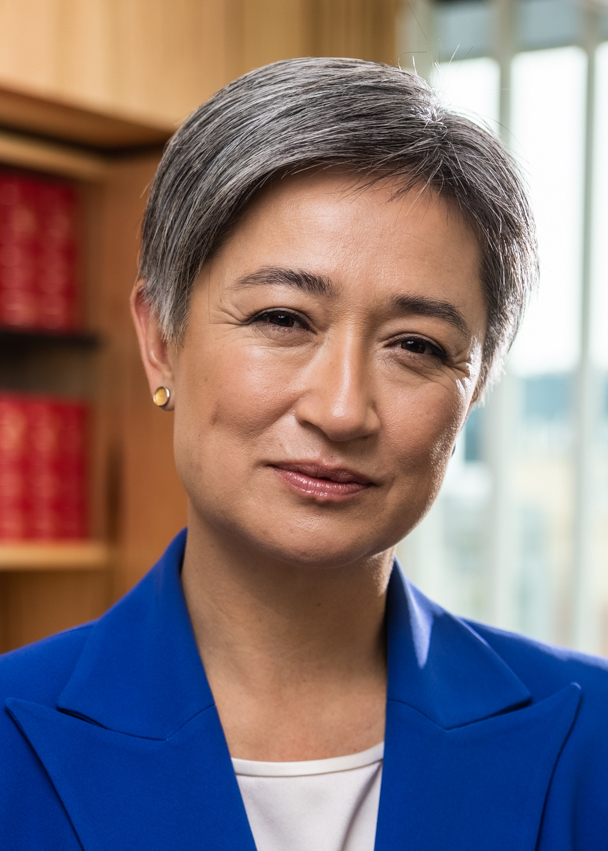
Leader of the Government in the Senate Penny Wong

=== House of Representatives ===
All 151 seats in the lower house were contested in the election in May 2022.

==== Australian Capital Territory ====
▌ Andrew Leigh (ALP—Fenner)
▌ Alicia Payne (ALP—Canberra)
▌ David Smith (ALP—Bean)

==== New South Wales ====
▌ Anthony Albanese (ALP—Grayndler)
▌ Alison Byrnes (ALP—Cunningham)
▌ Chris Bowen (ALP—McMahon)
▌ Tony Burke (ALP—Watson)
▌ Linda Burney (ALP—Barton)
▌ Andrew Charlton (ALP—Parramatta)
▌ Jason Clare (ALP—Blaxland)
▌ Sharon Claydon (ALP—Newcastle)
▌ David Coleman (LP—Banks)
▌ Pat Conaghan (NAT—Cowper)
▌ Pat Conroy (ALP—Shortland)
▌ Mark Coulton (NAT—Parkes)
▌ Justine Elliot (ALP—Richmond)
▌ Paul Fletcher (LP—Bradfield)
▌ Mike Freelander (ALP—Macarthur)
▌ Andrew Gee (IND—Calare)
▌ David Gillespie (NAT—Lyne)
▌ Alex Hawke (LP—Mitchell)
▌ Kevin Hogan (NAT—Page)
▌ Ed Husic (ALP—Chifley)
▌ Stephen Jones (ALP—Whitlam)
▌ Barnaby Joyce (NAT—New England)
▌ Simon Kennedy (LP—Cook)
▌ Jerome Laxale (ALP—Bennelong)
▌ Dai Le (IND—Fowler)
▌ Julian Leeser (LP—Berowra)
▌ Sussan Ley (LP—Farrer)
▌ Kristy McBain (ALP—Eden-Monaro)
▌ Emma McBride (ALP—Dobell)
▌ Michael McCormack (NAT—Riverina)
▌ Melissa McIntosh (LP—Lindsay)
▌ Fiona Phillips (ALP—Gilmore)
▌ Tanya Plibersek (ALP—Sydney)
▌ Gordon Reid (ALP—Robertson)
▌ Dan Repacholi (ALP—Hunter)
▌ Michelle Rowland (ALP—Greenway)
▌ Sophie Scamps (IND—Mackellar)
▌ Sally Sitou (ALP—Reid)
▌ Allegra Spender (IND—Wentworth)
▌ Anne Stanley (ALP—Werriwa)
▌ Zali Steggall (IND—Warringah)
▌ Meryl Swanson (ALP—Paterson)
▌ Angus Taylor (LP—Hume)
▌ Susan Templeman (ALP—Macquarie)
▌ Matt Thistlethwaite (ALP—Kingsford Smith)
▌ Kylea Tink (IND—North Sydney)
▌ Jenny Ware (LP—Hughes)

==== Northern Territory ====
▌ Luke Gosling (ALP—Solomon)
▌ Marion Scrymgour (ALP—Lingiari)

==== Queensland ====
▌ Karen Andrews (LNP—McPherson)
▌ Stephen Bates (AG—Brisbane)
▌ Angie Bell (LNP—Moncrieff)
▌ Colin Boyce (LNP—Flynn)
▌ Scott Buchholz (LNP—Wright)
▌ Cameron Caldwell (LNP—Fadden)
▌ Jim Chalmers (ALP—Rankin)
▌ Max Chandler-Mather (AG—Griffith)
▌ Milton Dick (ALP—Oxley)
▌ Peter Dutton (LNP—Dickson)
▌ Warren Entsch (LNP—Leichhardt)
▌ Garth Hamilton (LNP—Groom)
▌ Luke Howarth (LNP—Petrie)
▌ Bob Katter (KAP—Kennedy)
▌ Michelle Landry (LNP—Capricornia)
▌ David Littleproud (LNP—Maranoa)
▌ Shayne Neumann (ALP—Blair)
▌ Llew O'Brien (LNP—Wide Bay)
▌ Ted O'Brien (LNP—Fairfax)
▌ Graham Perrett (ALP—Moreton)
▌ Henry Pike (LNP—Bowman)
▌ Keith Pitt (LNP—Hinkler)
▌ Phillip Thompson (LNP—Herbert)
▌ Bert van Manen (LNP—Forde)
▌ Ross Vasta (LNP—Bonner)
▌ Andrew Wallace (LNP—Fisher)
▌ Elizabeth Watson-Brown (AG—Ryan)
▌ Anika Wells (ALP—Lilley)
▌ Andrew Willcox (LNP—Dawson)
▌ Terry Young (LNP—Longman)

==== South Australia ====
▌ Matt Burnell (ALP—Spence)
▌ Mark Butler (ALP—Hindmarsh)
▌ Steve Georganas (ALP—Adelaide)
▌ Louise Miller-Frost (ALP—Boothby)
▌ Tony Pasin (LP—Barker)
▌ Rowan Ramsey (LP—Grey)
▌ Amanda Rishworth (ALP—Kingston)
▌ Rebekha Sharkie (CA—Mayo)
▌ James Stevens (LP—Sturt)
▌ Tony Zappia (ALP—Makin)

==== Tasmania ====
▌ Bridget Archer (LP—Bass)
▌ Julie Collins (ALP—Franklin)
▌ Brian Mitchell (ALP—Lyons)
▌ Gavin Pearce (LP—Braddon)
▌ Andrew Wilkie (IND—Clark)

==== Victoria ====
▌ Michelle Ananda-Rajah (ALP—Higgins)
▌ Adam Bandt (AG—Melbourne)
▌ Jodie Belyea (ALP—Dunkley)
▌ Sam Birrell (NAT—Nicholls)
▌ Russell Broadbent (IND—Monash)
▌ Josh Burns (ALP—Macnamara)
▌ Darren Chester (NAT—Gippsland)
▌ Lisa Chesters (ALP—Bendigo)
▌ Libby Coker (ALP—Corangamite)
▌ Zoe Daniel (IND—Goldstein)
▌ Mary Doyle (ALP—Aston)
▌ Mark Dreyfus (ALP—Isaacs)
▌ Cassandra Fernando (ALP—Holt)
▌ Carina Garland (ALP—Chisholm)
▌ Andrew Giles (ALP—Scullin)
▌ Helen Haines (IND—Indi)
▌ Julian Hill (ALP—Bruce)
▌ Ged Kearney (ALP—Cooper)
▌ Peter Khalil (ALP—Wills)
▌ Catherine King (ALP—Ballarat)
▌ Richard Marles (ALP—Corio)
▌ Zoe McKenzie (LP—Flinders)
▌ Rob Mitchell (ALP—McEwen)
▌ Daniel Mulino (ALP—Fraser)
▌ Jodie Belyea (ALP—Dunkley)
▌ Brendan O'Connor (ALP—Gorton)
▌ Clare O'Neil (ALP—Hotham)
▌ Sam Rae (ALP—Hawke)
▌ Joanne Ryan (ALP—Lalor)
▌ Monique Ryan (IND—Kooyong)
▌ Bill Shorten (ALP—Maribyrnong)
▌ Michael Sukkar (LP—Deakin)
▌ Dan Tehan (LP—Wannon)
▌ Kate Thwaites (ALP—Jagajaga)
▌ Maria Vamvakinou (ALP—Calwell)
▌ Aaron Violi (LP—Casey)
▌ Tim Watts (ALP—Gellibrand)
▌ Anne Webster (NAT—Mallee)
▌ Keith Wolahan (LP—Menzies)
▌ Jason Wood (LP—La Trobe)

==== Western Australia ====
▌ Anne Aly (ALP—Cowan)
▌ Kate Chaney (IND—Curtin)
▌ Ian Goodenough (LP—Moore)
▌ Patrick Gorman (ALP—Perth)
▌ Andrew Hastie (LP—Canning)
▌ Matt Keogh (ALP—Burt)
▌ Madeleine King (ALP—Brand)
▌ Tania Lawrence (ALP—Hasluck)
▌ Sam Lim (ALP—Tangney)
▌ Nola Marino (LP—Forrest)
▌ Zaneta Mascarenhas (ALP—Swan)
▌ Melissa Price (LP—Durack)
▌ Tracey Roberts (ALP—Pearce)
▌ Josh Wilson (ALP—Fremantle)
▌ Rick Wilson (LP—O'Connor)

Current House composition by division Held by Labor Coalition Held by Liberal Held by National Held by Liberal National Held by Greens Held by Centre Alliance Held by Katter's Australian Held by Independent

== Changes in membership ==
=== Senate ===
This table lists senators who have resigned, died, been elected or appointed, or otherwise changed their party affiliation during the 47th Parliament.

Seat	Before		Change		After		
Seat	Member	Party	Type	Date	Date	Member	Party
New South Wales	Jim Molan	Liberal	Death	16 January 2023	31 May 2023	Maria Kovacic	Liberal
Victoria	Lidia Thorpe	Greens	Resignation from party	6 February 2023		Lidia Thorpe	Independent
Victoria	David Van	Liberal	Expulsion from party room	15 June 2023		David Van	Independent
New South Wales	Marise Payne	Liberal	Resignation	30 September 2023	30 November 2023	Dave Sharma	Liberal
Western Australia	Pat Dodson	Labor	Resignation	26 January 2024	1 February 2024	Varun Ghosh	Labor
Victoria	Linda White	Labor	Death	29 February 2024	29 May 2024	Lisa Darmanin	Labor
Tasmania	Tammy Tyrrell	Lambie	Resignation from party	28 March 2024		Tammy Tyrrell	Independent
Victoria	Janet Rice	Greens	Resignation	19 April 2024	1 May 2024	Steph Hodgins-May	Greens
Western Australia	Fatima Payman	Labor	Resignation from party	4 July 2024		Fatima Payman	Independent
Queensland	Gerard Rennick	LNP	Resignation from party	25 August 2024		Gerard Rennick	Independent
Queensland	Gerard Rennick	Independent	Joined new party	10 September 2024		Gerard Rennick	People First
South Australia	Simon Birmingham	Liberal	Resignation	28 January 2025	6 February 2025	Leah Blyth	Liberal
After prorogation
Tasmania	Anne Urquhart	Labor	Resignation	28 March 2025	27 May 2025	Josh Dolega	Labor
Northern Territory	Jacinta Nampijinpa Price	National	Switching party-room	9 May 2025		Jacinta Nampijinpa Price	Liberal
Western Australia	Dorinda Cox	Greens	Resignation from party	2 June 2025		Dorinda Cox	Labor

=== House of Representatives ===
This table lists members of the House who have resigned, died, been elected or appointed, or otherwise changed their party affiliation during the 47th Parliament.

Seat	Before		Change		After		
Seat	Member	Party	Type	Date	Date	Member	Party
Calare	Andrew Gee	National	Resignation from party	23 December 2022		Andrew Gee	Independent
Aston	Alan Tudge	Liberal	Resignation	17 February 2023	1 April 2023	Mary Doyle	Labor
Fadden	Stuart Robert	Liberal National	Resignation	18 May 2023	15 July 2023	Cameron Caldwell	Liberal National
Monash	Russell Broadbent	Liberal	Resignation from party	14 November 2023		Russell Broadbent	Independent
Dunkley	Peta Murphy	Labor	Death	4 December 2023	2 March 2024	Jodie Belyea	Labor
Cook	Scott Morrison	Liberal	Resignation	28 February 2024	13 April 2024	Simon Kennedy	Liberal
Moore	Ian Goodenough	Liberal	Party membership lapsed	12 January 2025		Ian Goodenough	Independent
Hinkler	Keith Pitt	Liberal National	Resignation	19 January 2025		Vacant	Vacant
Maribyrnong	Bill Shorten	Labor	Resignation	20 January 2025		Vacant	Vacant

== See also ==
- 46th Parliament of Australia
- Albanese Government
- 2020s in Australian political history
- Members of the Australian House of Representatives, 2022–2025
- Members of the Australian Senate, 2022–2025
