= David Van =

Australian politician (born 1964)

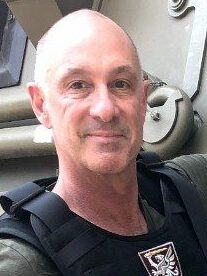
- Van in 2022

Senator for Victoria
- In office 1 July 2019 – 30 June 2025
- Preceded by: Derryn Hinch
- Succeeded by: Michelle Ananda-Rajah

Personal details
- Born: 14 November 1964 (age 61) Melbourne, Victoria
- Party: Independent (since 2023)
- Other political affiliations: Liberal (until 2023)
- Occupation: Politician
- Website: https://davidvan.com.au

David Allan Van (born 14 November 1964) is an Australian former politician. He was elected as a member of the Liberal Party and was sworn in as a Senator for Victoria on 1 July 2019. He was not re-elected at the 2025 federal election and finished his six-year term on 30 June 2025.

In June 2023, Van was accused of sexual assault by Senator Lidia Thorpe and former Senator Amanda Stoker. In response, he was expelled from the Liberal party room, and resigned from the Liberal Party to sit as an independent.

== Early life ==
Van has an undergraduate degree in horticulture, and as part of his degree studied the regeneration of Australian bush post the Ash Wednesday fires in the Blackwood forest that was burned as part of the Trentham East fire complex.

== Career ==
Van was a public affairs consultant from 1995 until entering parliament, becoming managing director of South Melbourne public relations firm the De Wintern Group since 2003, where he advised clients on royal commissions and other government inquiries. He was a board director of the Australian Association of Franchisees. A St Kilda resident, he was also the co-convenor of neighbourhood group Friends of St Kilda Hill, which was outspoken about crime and safety, specifically in relation to the Gatwick Hotel boarding house and public housing.

Van holds a master's degree in international relations from Monash University.

== Politics ==
Van was elected to the Senate at the 2019 federal election from the marginal third position on the Liberal ticket. He was assigned a party role as "patron" for the Labor-held House seat of Dunkley. In his first speech in September 2019, Van spoke of his belief in the "dignity of work", defended the coalition government's welfare policies, and stated that he believed in "free markets, freedom of speech, and most importantly in my view, getting government out of people's lives to the most practicable extent possible". Van was a member of the centre-right faction of the Liberal Party during the Morrison government years, but became factionally unaligned after the 2022 Australian federal election.

In February 2021, Van called for an independent review into ABC complaints.

As Chair of the Parliamentary friends of Ukraine, Van was a proponent for providing support for Ukraine in the 2022 Russian invasion of Ukraine, particularly the Bushmaster and Hawkei armoured vehicles.

Until his expulsion from the parliamentary Liberal party in June 2023, Van was a member of multiple committees including the Joint Standing Committees for Trade & Investment Growth and Treaties, as well as Senate Select Committee for Foreign Interference through Social Media, Senate Committee on Environment & Communication and Legal & Constitutional Affairs.

Van chaired the Senate Select Committee on Energy Planning and Regulation in Australia from September 2024 until the committee tabled its final report on 20 December 2024.

== Misconduct allegations ==
In November 2021, then Prime Minister Scott Morrison said he was "disappointed" after claims that Van had made "growling and dog noises" at Senator Jacqui Lambie as she spoke during Senate Question Time, on the same day as the Sex Discrimination Commissioner released a report into harassment and workplace culture at Parliament House. Van later "apologised unreservedly" for interjecting but denied making "growling noises".

In June 2023, under parliamentary privilege, Senator Lidia Thorpe accused Van of sexual assault.

Former Liberal National Senator Amanda Stoker released a statement alleging that she had also been inappropriately touched by Van. Stoker accused Van of squeezing her buttocks twice at a social gathering in November 2020. She said she raised the issue with Van the next day and he apologised.

Van was expelled from the parliamentary Liberal party room by Opposition Leader Peter Dutton after additional allegations of misconduct were raised with him, requiring him to sit on the Senate cross bench. Van denies all of the allegations. The following day on radio station 2GB Dutton urged him to resign, saying "I think it is in everyone's best interest that he resign from the parliament and I hope he's able to do that sooner than later. And, and seek the help that he needs".

In July 2023 it was reported that the Australian Defence Force (ADF) undertook an extensive investigation into allegations of inappropriate behaviour by Senator Van while he was on an ADF parliament program voyage in July 2021, and that the office of then Prime Minister Scott Morrison was notified and declined to take any action.

In December 2023, Van was reported as using "taxpayer funded resources for pleasure and private business endeavours". A Current Affair and The Age accused Van of using his parliamentary email address to discuss private business matters related to his former public relations firm, and using his official Instagram account to harass women.
