= 2024 Dunkley by-election =

By-election for a seat in the Australian House of Representatives

- 2 March 2024

Division of Dunkley (Vic) in the House of Representatives
- Opinion polls
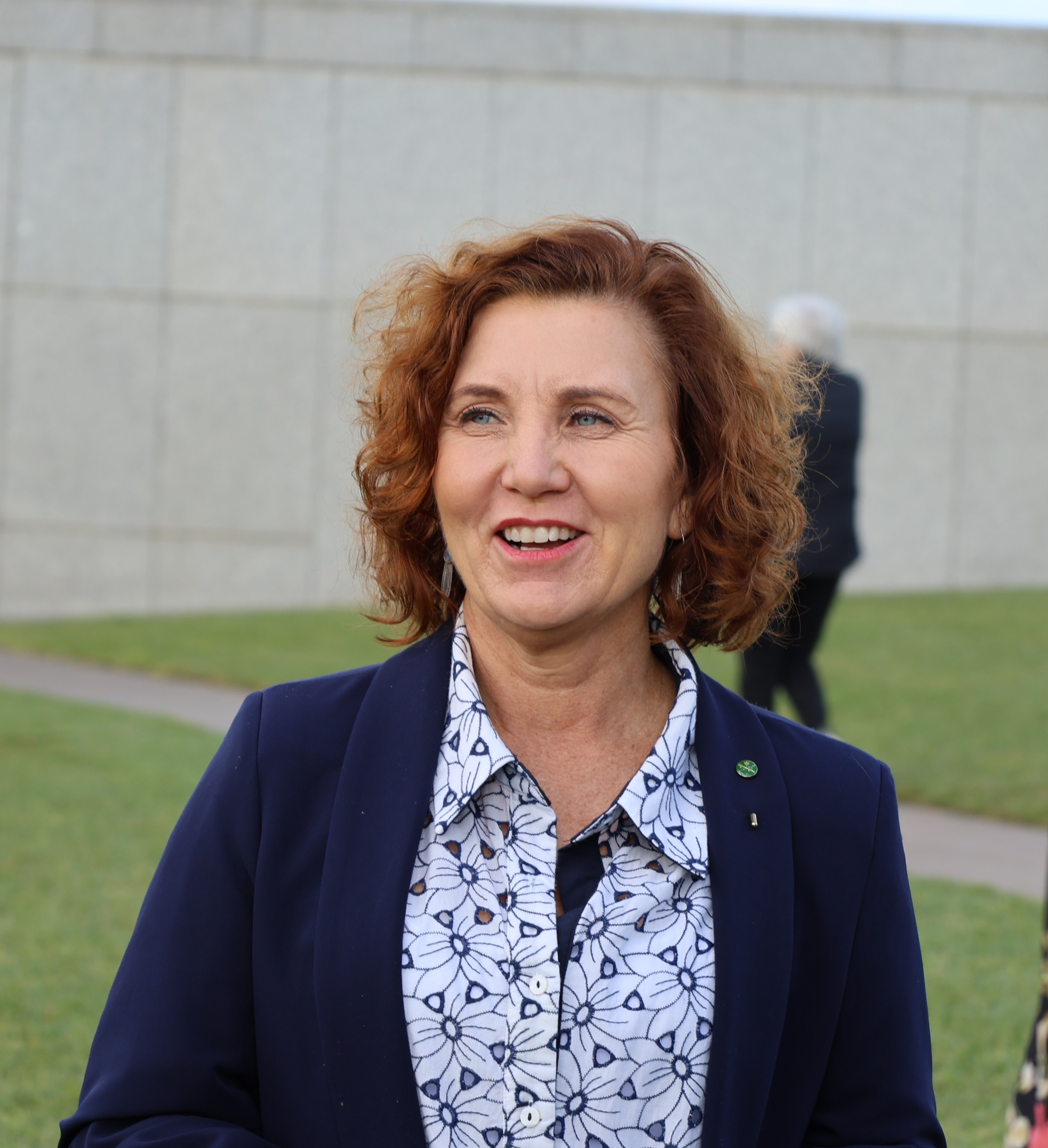

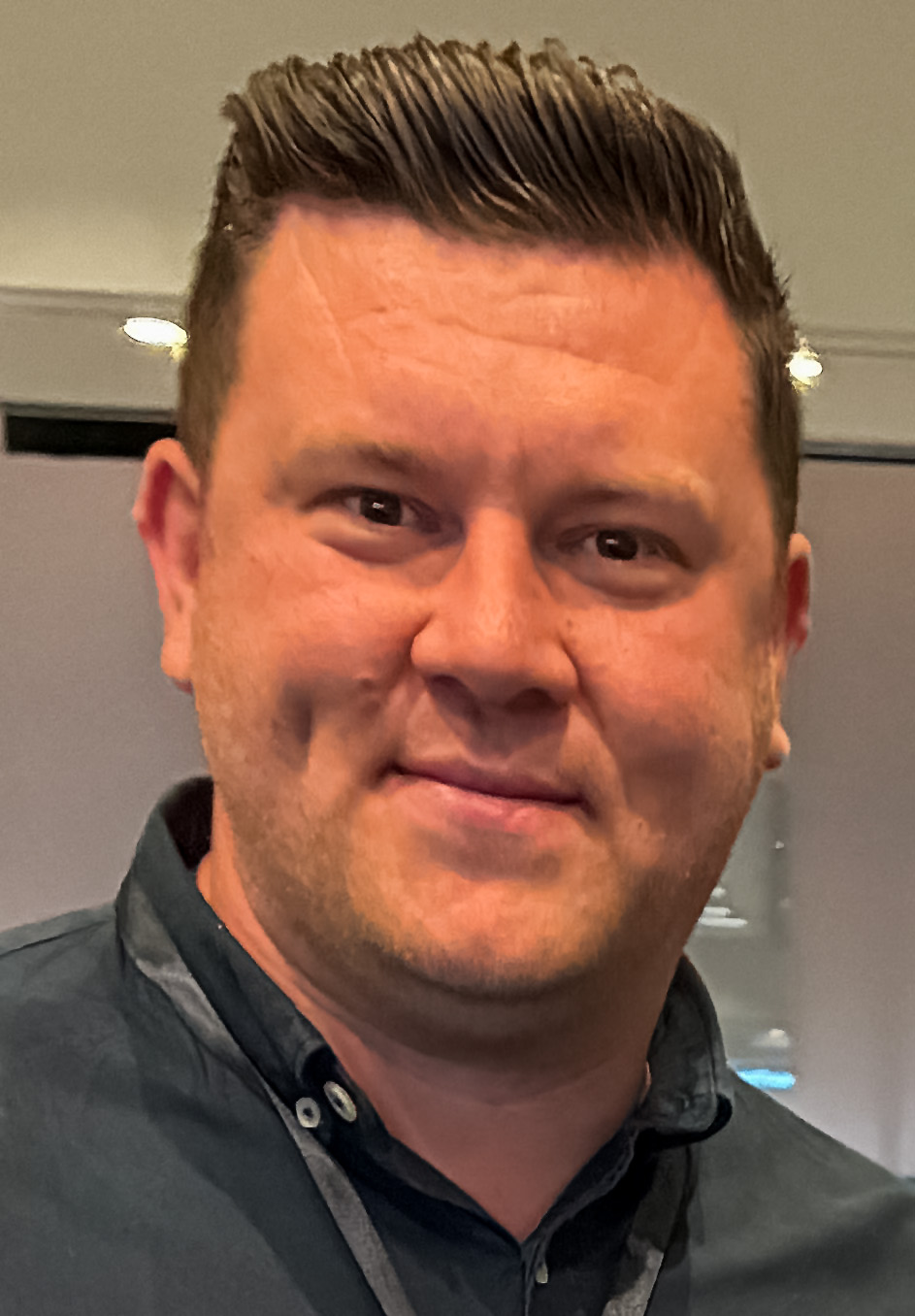
	First party	Second party
Candidate	Jodie Belyea	Nathan Conroy
Party	Labor	Liberal
Primary vote	37,418	35,746
Percentage	41.07%	39.23%
Swing	▲0.84	▲6.73
TPP	52.70%	47.30%
TPP swing	▼3.57	▲3.57
MP before election
Peta Murphy
Labor
Elected MP
Jodie Belyea
Labor

A by-election to elect the next member of the Australian House of Representatives in the electorate of Dunkley was held on 2 March 2024, following the death of sitting member Peta Murphy in December 2023. Jodie Belyea retained the seat for the Labor Party, winning 52.7% of the two-party preferred vote.

It was the third federal by-election to have taken place since the first sitting of the 47th Parliament, as well as being the first federal by-election in a Labor seat since 2020 and the first federal by-election triggered by a member's death since 2015.

== Background ==
The by-election was triggered by the death of sitting Labor member Peta Murphy, who died at 50 years old due to breast cancer. Murphy was first diagnosed with breast cancer when she was 37.

Murphy was elected as the member of Dunkley in 2019, after she unseated one-term incumbent Liberal MP Chris Crewther. At the 2022 federal election, Murphy was re-elected with an increased majority, turning it into a fairly safe seat.

The seat of Dunkley has been held by both Labor and the Liberals and has traditionally been a marginal seat. The seat has never been a safe or very safe seat and has only been a fairly safe seat (defined by the Australian Electoral Commission as a seat held by between 6 and 10 percent), twice: in 2004 (won by the Liberals with a margin of 9.38%) and in 2022 (won by Labor with a margin of 6.27%).

Since its creation in 1984, Dunkley has flipped between both major parties. It was Labor from 1984 until 1990, when the Liberals gained the seat. The seat went back to Labor in 1993 before the Liberals regained it in 1996 and held it until 2016.

While by-elections usually swing against the government, there are exceptions. At the 2023 by-election in the seat of Aston in eastern Melbourne, Labor won the seat from the Liberals, making it the first time the Government has won a seat from the Opposition at a federal by-election since 1920. However, at the 2023 by-election in the seat of Fadden on the Gold Coast, the Liberal National Party retained the seat with an increased majority.

Two-party-preferred vote in Dunkley, 1996–2022
Election	1996	1998	2001	2004	2007	2010	2013	2016	2019	2022
Liberal	53.36%	52.04%	55.42%	59.38%	54.04%	51.02%	55.57%	51.43%	47.26%	43.73%
Labor	46.64%	47.96%	44.58%	40.62%	45.96%	48.98%	44.43%	48.57%	52.74%	56.27%
Government	L/NP	L/NP	L/NP	L/NP	ALP	ALP	L/NP	L/NP	L/NP	ALP

=== Previous election results ===
Murphy won the 2022 federal election with a 3.53% two-party-preferred swing towards her, and a 1.71% increase in primary vote. On the other hand, the Liberal Party had a 7.38% decrease in its primary vote. The Greens also contested the election and had a 1.95% increase in primary votes from the previous 2019 election.

Other parties and candidates that contested Dunkley at the 2022 election were United Australian Party, One Nation, Liberal Democratic Party, Animal Justice Party, Australian Federation Party and an independent candidate Darren Bergwerf, with each of them achieving less than 10% of the primary vote.

Out of the Dunkley candidates in the 2022 election, only Bergwerf contested this by-election.

== Key dates ==
Key dates in relation to the by-election are:

- 29 January 2024 – Issue of writ
- 5 February 2024 – Close of roll
- 8 February 2024 – Close of nominations
- 9 February 2024 – Declaration of nominations
- 19 February 2024 – Commencement of early voting
- 28 February 2024 – Applications for postal voting closes
- 2 March 2024 – Polling day
- 8 May 2024 – Last day for return of writ

== Candidates ==
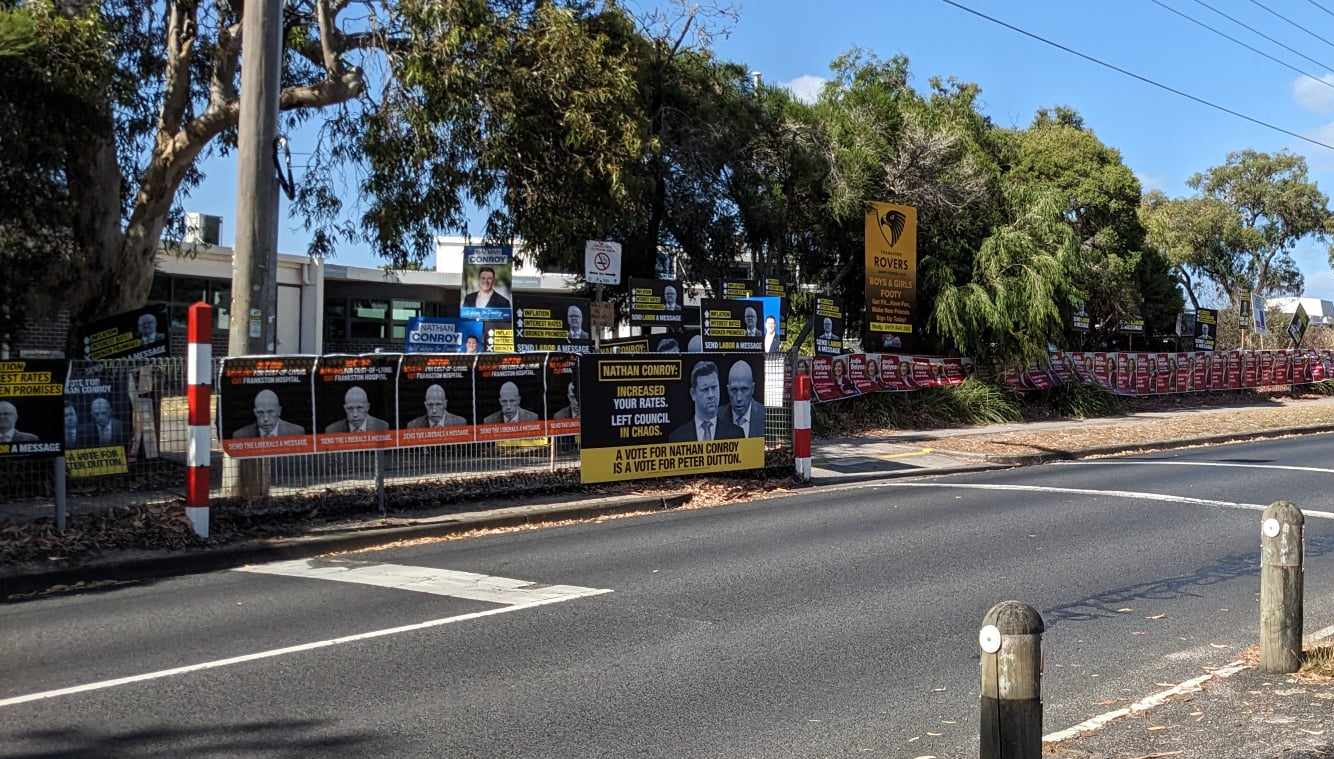
Signage at a polling place, Overport Primary School in Frankston

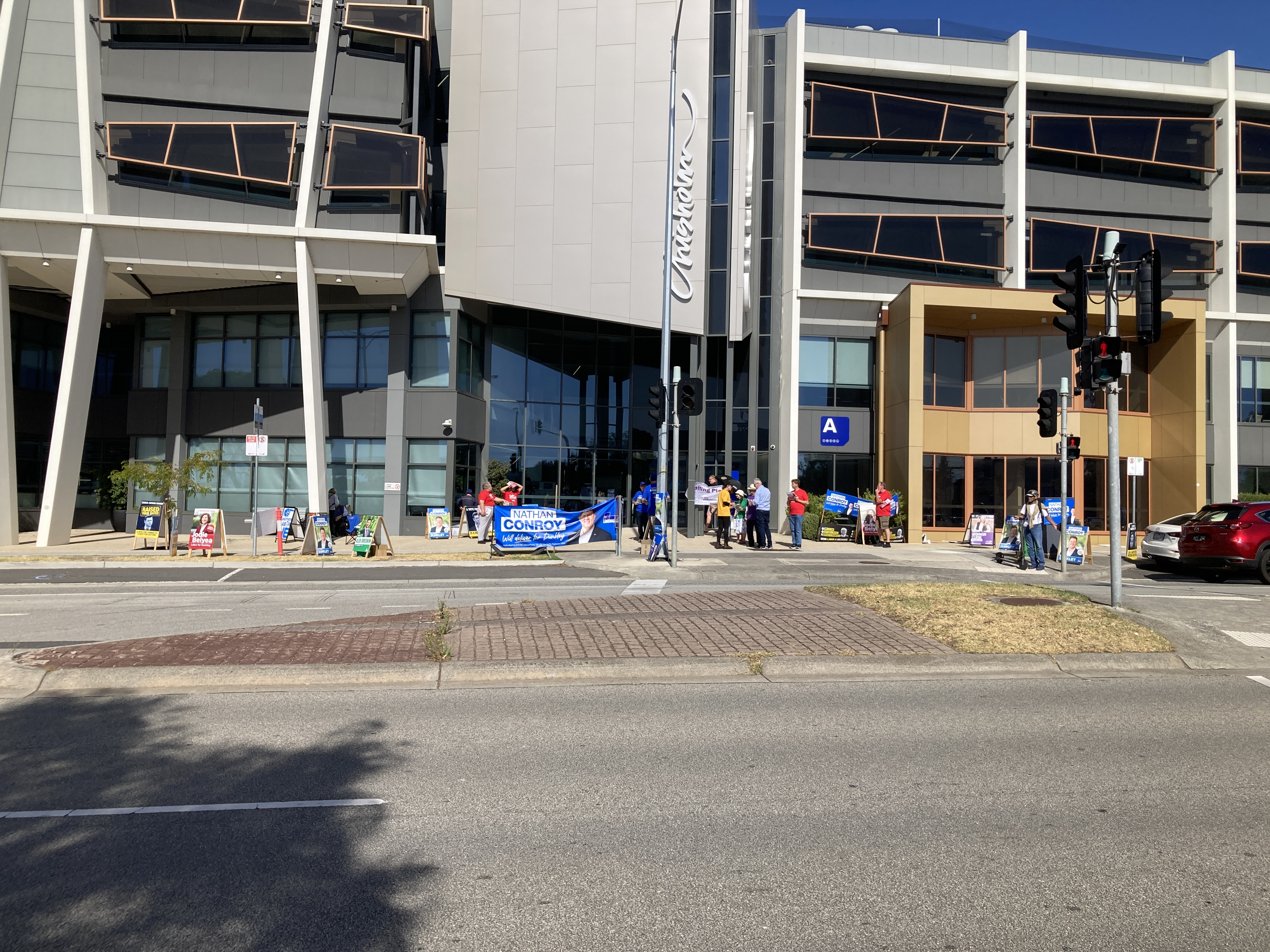
A polling place at Chisholm Institute in Frankston

Candidates are listed in the order they appeared on the ballot.

Party	Candidate	Background
Liberal	Nathan Conroy	Mayor of Frankston
Animal Justice	Bronwyn Currie	Businesswoman and nominee for the Senate at the 2022 federal election
Libertarian	Chrysten Abraham	Human resources specialist and nominee for Flinders at the 2022 federal election
Victorian Socialists	Reem Yunis	Teacher and activist
Independent	Darren Bergwerf	Sovereign citizen activist, conspiracy theorist and candidate for Dunkley at the 2022 federal election
Greens	Alex Breskin	Software engineer and nominee for Isaacs at the 2022 federal election
Australian Democrats	Heath McKenzie	Landscaper and horticulturist; also endorsed by the Fusion Party
Labor	Jodie Belyea	Non-profit executive

=== Labor ===
Rod Glover, Peta Murphy's husband, was asked by "senior figures and local branch members" to run as Labor's candidate. Additionally, it was speculated in the media that former Victorian premier Daniel Andrews was a possible contender, however neither of these eventuated. On 11 January 2024, Jodie Belyea was announced as Labor's candidate.

=== Liberal ===
Three candidates ran for Liberal Party preselection − Frankston mayor and councillor Nathan Conroy, former Victorian MP Donna Hope and former Liberal candidate Bec Buchanan. A fourth candidate, David Burgess, withdrew from the race. Conroy won preselection on 14 January 2024.

==== Preselection results ====
Party	Candidate	Votes	%	±%
Liberal	Nathan Conroy	89	57.79	
Liberal	Donna Hope	40	25.97	
Liberal	Bec Buchanan	25	16.23	
Total formal votes		154	100.0	

== Campaign ==
The by-election saw conservative activist group Advance spend nearly $300,000 to unseat Labor, with its advertising described as "Trumpian" and a "fear campaign" by Victorian Labor MLA Paul Edbrooke.

== Opinion polling ==
Date	Firm	Sample size	Margin of error	Primary vote									2PP vote	
Date	Firm	Sample size	Margin of error	ALP	LIB	GRN	IND	LBT	AJP	DEM	VS	OTH	ALP	LIB
2 March 2024	By-election			41.0%	38.9%	6.5%	4.9%	2.7%	2.9%	1.4%	1.8%	N/A	52.7%	47.3%
15–22 February 2024	YouGov	394	± 6.1%	33%	40%	9%	7%	3%	2%	3%	3%	N/A	49%	51%
5–6 February 2024	uComms (Note: Sponsored by the Australia Institute)	626	± 3.9%	40.1%	39.3%	8.2%	N/A	1.6%	N/A	N/A	N/A	10.8%	52%	48%
21 May 2022	Election			40.2%	32.5%	10.3%	3.9%	2.5%	2.1%	N/A	N/A	14.8%	56.3%	43.7%

== Results ==
2024 Dunkley by-election
Party	Candidate	Votes	%	±%
Labor	Jodie Belyea	37,418	41.07	+0.84
Liberal	Nathan Conroy	35,746	39.23	+6.73
Greens	Alex Breskin	5,798	6.36	−3.98
Independent	Darren Bergwerf	4,315	4.74	+0.87
Animal Justice	Bronwyn Currie	2,818	3.09	+0.99
Libertarian	Chrysten Abraham	2,246	2.47	−0.04
Victorian Socialists	Reem Yunis	1,529	1.68	+1.68
Democrats	Heath McKenzie	1,242	1.36	+1.36
Total formal votes		91,112	95.86	+0.59
Informal votes		3,930	4.14	−0.59
Turnout		95,042	83.79	−6.27
Two-party-preferred result
Labor	Jodie Belyea	48,019	52.70	−3.57
Liberal	Nathan Conroy	43,093	47.30	+3.57
Labor hold		Swing	−3.57	

== Aftermath ==
Belyea and Conroy contested the Dunkley seat again in 2025 for the federal election, with Belyea winning.

== See also ==
- List of Australian federal by-elections
