= Frank Ford (Australian politician) =

Australian politician (born 1936)

Member of the Australian Parliament for Dunkley
- In office 24 March 1990 – 13 March 1993
- Preceded by: Bob Chynoweth
- Succeeded by: Bob Chynoweth

Personal details
- Born: 10 August 1936 (age 89) Adelaide, South Australia, Australia
- Party: Liberal
- Occupation: Company director

Frank Allen Ford (born 10 August 1936) is a former Australian businessman and politician. He represented the Liberal Party in the House of Representatives from 1990 to 1993, representing the Victorian seat of Dunkley. In 1996 he was convicted of fraud relating to the liquidation of his engineering firm.

== Early life ==
Ford was born in Adelaide on 10 August 1936. He was the managing director of a rollover protection structure (ROPS) engineering firm, Safety ROPS (Aust) Pty Ltd. He served on the Victorian council of the Australian Small Business Association, including as state president for a period.

== Politics ==
Ford was elected to parliament at the 1990 federal election, defeating the incumbent Australian Labor Party (ALP) member Bob Chynoweth in the Division of Dunkley. He was identified as a member of the "New Right" faction and had earlier stood for Liberal preselection in the Division of Goldstein against the incumbent MP Ian Macphee.

In parliament, Ford served on the Joint Statutory Committee on Corporations and Securities and the House of Representatives Standing Committee on Industry, Science and Technology. His predecessor Bob Chynoweth reclaimed Dunkley for the ALP at the 1993 election.

== ASC conflict and fraud conviction ==
In November 1993, Ford was charged by the Australian Securities Commission (ASC) with 29 counts of false accounting, three counts of "failing to act honestly as a director", one count of "transferring company property with intent to defraud", and one count of "making a material omission in a report". The charges related to allegations that he had engaged in bottom of the harbour tax avoidance by liquidating Safety ROPS (Aust) Pty Ltd and transferring its assets to Roll-Over Protection (Aust) Pty Ltd. He was convicted of fraud in 1996.

Ford had earlier come into conflict with the ASC during its investigation. In December 1992, he used parliamentary privilege to describe an ASC visit to his company's office as a "terrorist attack", also referring to an ASC senior investigator as a "jack-booted thug" and comparing the organisation to the Gestapo and KGB. He further alleged that the ASC had leaked details of his company finances to political opponents and The Age, and that the investigation into his company was a retaliation for his actions on a Senate committee into the ASC.

Parliament of Australia
Preceded by Bob Chynoweth	Member for Dunkley; 1990–1993	Succeeded by Bob Chynoweth
