= Bob Chynoweth =

Australian politician (born 1941)

Member of the Australian Parliament for Flinders
- In office 5 March 1983 – 1 December 1984
- Preceded by: Peter Reith
- Succeeded by: Peter Reith

Member of the Australian Parliament for Dunkley
- In office 1 December 1984 – 24 March 1990
- Preceded by: New seat
- Succeeded by: Frank Ford
- In office 13 March 1993 – 2 March 1996
- Preceded by: Frank Ford
- Succeeded by: Bruce Billson

Personal details
- Born: 7 June 1941 (age 84) Richmond, Victoria
- Party: Australian Labor Party

Robert Leslie Chynoweth (born 7 June 1941) is an Australian politician. He was an Australian Labor Party member of the Australian House of Representatives from 1983 to 1990 and again from 1993 to 1996.

== Early life ==
Chynoweth was born in Richmond, an inner suburb of Melbourne to a family of Cornish descent.

== Politics ==
Chynoweth first entered federal parliament at the federal election of March 1983, as part of a landslide Labor win under the leadership of Bob Hawke. He was the Labor candidate for the seat of Flinders, based on the outer south eastern fringe of Melbourne. He defeated incumbent Liberal member Peter Reith. Only months earlier Labor had failed to win Flinders, with a different candidate, Rogan Ward, at a by-election held in December 1982. Ward did not become the candidate again due to dissatisfaction with his candidacy at the by-election.

Following a redistribution of electoral boundaries in 1984, Chynoweth opted to contest the seat of Dunkley. He was defeated for Labor preselection by Albert Knowles of the left faction, but the preselection result was overturned by the National Executive's decision to mandate the endorsement of all sitting MPs.

Dunkley was one of a number of new seats created as a consequence of the enlargement of parliament. The seat took in much of the urban area previously covered by Flinders, and was considered a safer bet for a Labor candidate than the redistributed Flinders. (Dunkley was created with a notional two-party margin of Labor 53.2% to Liberal 46.8%. Flinders had a notional post-redistribution two-party margin of Labor 50.7% to Liberal 49.3%.) Chynoweth won the seat of Dunkley at the 1984 federal election and was re-elected in 1987.

Chynoweth was defeated at the 1990 federal election as one of a number of Labor losses in Victoria at that election. However, he was to make a comeback to politics by winning back the seat of Dunkley at the 1993 federal election. He defeated Liberal MP Frank Ford, who had defeated him three years earlier.

A redistribution that took place ahead of the 1996 federal election transformed Dunkley from a marginal Labor seat into a seat with a notional Liberal majority. Chynoweth re-contested the redistributed Dunkley but lost to Liberal candidate Bruce Billson.

Parliament of Australia
Preceded by Peter Reith	Member for Flinders; 1983–1984	Succeeded by Peter Reith
New division	Member for Dunkley; 1984–1990	Succeeded by Frank Ford
Preceded by Frank Ford	Member for Dunkley; 1993–1996	Succeeded by Bruce Billson
