= 2023 Fadden by-election =

- 15 July 2023

Division of Fadden (Queensland) in the House of Representatives
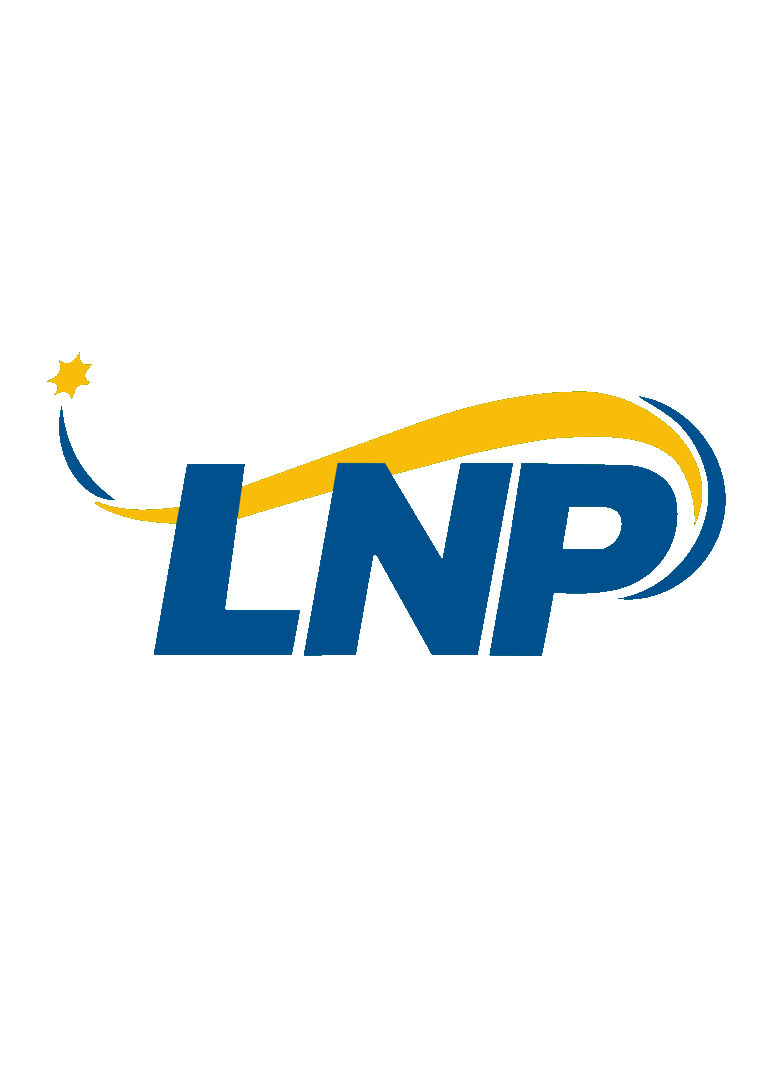

| | First party | Second party |
|---|---|---|
| Candidate | Cameron Caldwell | Letitia Del Fabbro |
| Party | Liberal National | Labor |
| Primary vote | 43,554 | 19,580 |
| Percentage | 49.08% | 22.06% |
| Swing | ▲4.46 | ▼0.29 |
| TPP | 63.35% | 36.65% |
| TPP swing | ▲2.72 | ▼2.72 |
- Results of the by-election by postcode
MP before election
Stuart Robert
Liberal National
Elected MP
Cameron Caldwell
Liberal National

The 2023 Fadden by-election was held on 15 July 2023 to elect the next member of the Australian House of Representatives in the electorate of Fadden in Queensland. The by-election was held as the result of the resignation on 18 May 2023 of the sitting member, Stuart Robert, who had represented the Liberal National Party (LNP) and sat in parliament with the Liberal Party of Australia.

The by-election was won by the LNP's candidate, Cameron Caldwell, with a positive swing of nearly 3% on the two-party preferred vote. The Labor Party's candidate, Letitia Del Fabbro, conceded defeat approximately two hours after the polls closed.

== Background ==
The Division of Fadden is situated in the northern part of the Gold Coast. The area has a mix of residential, commercial, and industrial areas and is a popular tourist destination due to its proximity to the Gold Coast theme parks (Dreamworld, Movie World, Sea World and Wet'n'Wild). As of the 2021 census, the Division of Fadden has a population of approximately 163,000 people. The division has a higher-than-average proportion of young families and first-home buyers, as well as a large retiree population. The median weekly household income in the division is $1,719, which is slightly higher than the national average.

The division has largely been a safe seat for the Liberal National Party and its predecessors since its creation, with only one period of Labor representation between 1983 and 1984. Stuart Robert had held the seat since 2007. Robert previously held various ministerial positions, including Minister for Veterans' Affairs and Minister for Human Services.

Robert had been involved in several scandals prior to his resignation from the seat, including allegedly intervening in contracts to sign up corporate clients to a lobbying firm he had links to, billing taxpayers $3,000 per month for his home internet and his role in the Morrison Government’s illegal Robodebt scheme.

Two-party-preferred vote in Fadden, 1996–2022
| Election | 1996 | 1998 | 2001 | 2004 | 2007 | 2010 | 2013 | 2016 | 2019 | 2022 |
|---|---|---|---|---|---|---|---|---|---|---|
| Liberal/LNP | 67.84% | 57.59% | 62.29% | 65.28% | 60.20% | 64.19% | 64.36% | 61.05% | 64.18% | 60.63% |
| Labor | 32.16% | 42.41% | 37.71% | 34.72% | 39.80% | 35.81% | 35.64% | 38.95% | 35.82% | 39.37% |
| Government | L/NP | L/NP | L/NP | L/NP | ALP | ALP | L/NP | L/NP | L/NP | ALP |

=== 2022 election results ===
Robert suffered a two-party-preferred 3.55% swing against him in the 2022 federal election, but the seat remains a safe Liberal National seat with a two-party-preferred vote of 60.63%. Despite having an increase in the two-party-preferred vote, Labor had a slight decrease of 0.16% in its primary vote. The Greens also contested the election and had a 1.73% increase in primary votes from the previous 2019 election. Other parties and candidates that contested Fadden at the 2022 election were One Nation, United Australia Party, Liberal Democrats and an independent candidate Stewart Brooker and each of them achieved less than 10% of the primary vote.

Three of the candidates from the 2022 election (Labor, One Nation, and Brooker) re-contested the by-election. The United Australia Party and Liberal Democrats were de-registered with the Australian Electoral Commission after the 2022 election and did not run in the by-election.

=== Previous by-election ===
The 2023 Fadden by-election was the second by-election in the 47th Parliament, following a by-election for the Melbourne seat of Aston, which was held on 1 April 2023 following the resignation of Alan Tudge. The upset loss of Aston was the first time in 103 years that a governing party won a federal seat from the opposition at a by-election (the last time before that being the 1920 Kalgoorlie by-election, where the Nationalist Party won the seat from Labor).

== Key dates ==
Key dates in relation to the by-election are:

- 12 June 2023 – Issue of writ
- 19 June 2023 – Close of electoral rolls
- 22 June 2023 – Close of nominations
- 15 July 2023 – Polling day (8am to 6pm)
- 20 September 2023 – Last day for the return of writs

== Candidates ==
The table below shows candidates according to the Australian Electoral Commission, listed in the order they appeared on the ballot.

| Party | Candidate | Background |
|---|---|---|
| Labor | Letitia Del Fabbro | Griffith University nurse educator and candidate for Fadden at the 2022 federal election |
| Greens | Scott Turner | Scientist and candidate for McPherson at the 2022 federal election |
| Australian Democrats | Chris Simpson | Engineer and candidate for the Senate at the 2022 federal election |
| One Nation | Sandy Roach | Businesswoman and candidate for Fadden at the 2022 federal election |
| Indigenous-Aboriginal | Marnie Laree Davis | Social worker |
| Legalise Cannabis | Suzette Luyken | Activist, former businesswoman and candidate for Gaven at the 2020 state election |
| Sustainable Australia | Quentin Bye | Technician and candidate for Myall Lakes at the 2019 New South Wales state election |
| Independent | Kevin Young | Businessman and founder of the unregistered Owners and Renters Party of Australia |
| Independent | Belinda Jones | Journalist and social media activist |
| Independent | Stewart Brooker | Stay-at-home father, former IT specialist, and candidate for Fadden at the 2022 federal election |
| Citizens | Jan Pukallus | Perennial candidate and Secretary of the Queensland Citizens Party |
| Liberal National | Cameron Caldwell | Gold Coast City Councillor |
| Federation | James Tayler | Businessman and candidate for Moncrieff at the 2022 federal election |

=== Labor ===
Given that the seat is considered safe for the LNP, there was speculation that Labor may have chosen not to endorse a candidate for the by-election. Local branches urged the party to contest anyway.

On 29 May, Labor announced it would contest the by-election, despite stating that it would be unlikely for them to win. On 2 June, it was confirmed that Griffith University nurse educator Letitia Del Fabbro, who stood as Labor's candidate for the seat at the 2022 federal election, had been endorsed to stand as Labor's candidate for the by-election.

=== Liberal National ===
On 8 May it was reported that Gold Coast councillor Cameron Caldwell and Fadden Liberal National Party branch president Fran Ward had both sought preselection.

On 28 May it was confirmed that five candidates were seeking Liberal National preselection. Alongside Caldwell and Ward, the shortlist included Craig Hobart, wealth manager Owen Caterer, and Order of Australia recipient and disability advocate Dinesh Palipana.

Other speculated candidates included former senator and current Sky News host Amanda Stoker, and Queensland state MP for Bonney Sam O'Connor.

Caldwell won preselection on 3 June 2023.

==== Preselection results ====
| Party | Candidate | Votes | % | ±% |
|---|---|---|---|---|
| Liberal National | Cameron Caldwell | 54 | 35.76 | |
| Liberal National | Dinesh Palipana | 37 | 24.50 | |
| Liberal National | Fran Ward | 34 | 22.51 | |
| Liberal National | Owen Caterer | 17 | 11.25 | |
| Liberal National | Craig Hobart | 9 | 5.96 | |
Final ballot result
| Liberal National | Cameron Caldwell | 88 | 61.11 | |
| Liberal National | Dinesh Palipana | 56 | 38.89 | |
| Total formal votes | | 151 | 100.0 | |

=== Greens ===
On 18 June 2023, the Gold Coast branch of the Greens announced Scott Turner as their Fadden candidate.

=== One Nation ===
One Nation ran Sandy Roach, their candidate from 2022.

=== Others ===
The Australian Citizens Party preselected Jan Pukallus as their candidate. Stewart Brooker, who ran for Fadden as an independent at the 2022 federal election, ran again. A second independent, Belinda Jones, also ran. On 13 June 2025, Legalise Cannabis Australia announced Suzette Luyken as its candidate.

== Campaign ==
The Liberal Party campaigned on the rising cost of living, opposing the Indigenous Voice to Parliament and the unpopularity of Prime Minister Anthony Albanese. Labor campaigned on the Robodebt scheme.

== Results ==
2023 Fadden by-election
| Party | Candidate | Votes | % | ±% |
|---|---|---|---|---|
| Liberal National | Cameron Caldwell | 43,554 | 49.08 | +4.46 |
| Labor | Letitia Del Fabbro | 19,580 | 22.06 | –0.29 |
| One Nation | Sandy Roach | 7,896 | 8.90 | +0.22 |
| Legalise Cannabis | Suzette Luyken | 6,424 | 7.24 | +7.24 |
| Greens | Scott Turner | 5,477 | 6.17 | –4.56 |
| Independent | Belinda Jones | 931 | 1.05 | +1.05 |
| Indigenous-Aboriginal | Marnie Laree Davis | 895 | 1.01 | +1.01 |
| Independent | Stewart Brooker | 805 | 0.91 | –3.26 |
| Sustainable Australia | Quentin Bye | 779 | 0.88 | +0.88 |
| Independent | Kevin Young | 641 | 0.72 | +0.72 |
| Federation | James Tayler | 607 | 0.68 | +0.68 |
| Democrats | Chris Simpson | 589 | 0.66 | +0.66 |
| Citizens | Jan Pukallus | 570 | 0.64 | +0.64 |
| Total formal votes | | 88,748 | 93.20 | −2.49 |
| Informal votes | | 6,473 | 6.80 | +2.49 |
| Turnout | | 95,221 | 72.54 | −14.00 |
Two-party-preferred result
| Liberal National | Cameron Caldwell | 56,224 | 63.35 | +2.72 |
| Labor | Letitia Del Fabbro | 32,524 | 36.65 | –2.72 |
| Liberal National hold | | Swing | +2.72 | |

== See also ==
- 2023 Aston by-election
- List of Australian federal by-elections
