= Cameron Caldwell =

Australian politician

Cameron Caldwell MP

Chief Opposition Whip in the House of Representatives
- Incumbent
- Assumed office 23 February 2026
- Deputy: Ben Small
- Leader: Angus Taylor
- Preceded by: Aaron Violi

Deputy Opposition Whip in the House of Representatives
- In office 28 May 2025 – 23 February 2026
- Leader: Sussan Ley; Angus Taylor
- Preceded by: Melissa Price
- Succeeded by: Ben Small

Member of the Australian Parliament for Fadden
- Incumbent
- Assumed office 15 July 2023
- Preceded by: Stuart Robert

Councillor of the City of Gold Coast for Division 4
- In office 28 March 2020 – 16 March 2024
- Preceded by: Kristyn Boulton
- Succeeded by: Shelley Curtis

Councillor of the City of Gold Coast for Division 3
- In office 28 April 2012 – 28 March 2020
- Preceded by: Grant Pforr
- Succeeded by: Donna Gates

Personal details
- Born: Cameron MacKenzie Caldwell; 22 May 1979 (age 47) Mount Isa, Queensland
- Party: LNP (Liberal)
- Children: 3
- Education: St Joseph's College, Nudgee
- Alma mater: Queensland University of Technology (LLB)
- Occupation: Lawyer, politician

Cameron MacKenzie Caldwell (born 22 May 1979) is an Australian politician who is a member of the House of Representatives representing the Division of Fadden. He was elected in the Fadden by-election in July 2023. He is a member of the Liberal National Party of Queensland and sits with the Liberal Party in the federal parliament.

Before his election to federal parliament, he served as a councillor on the City of Gold Coast council since 2012.

== Early life ==
Caldwell was born in Mount Isa, Queensland. He grew up in Redcliffe and attended St Joseph's College, Nudgee, going on to Queensland University of Technology. Prior to his election to parliament, he ran a law firm in the Gold Coast suburb of Hope Island.

== Political career ==
Caldwell was pre-selected by the Liberal National Party (LNP) to run in the seat of Broadwater at the 2012 Queensland state election. In February 2012, a month before the election, he was disendorsed after the party received a complaint from a member of the public about a trip Caldwell had made to a swinger's club. LNP leader Campbell Newman defended the party's decision to dump Caldwell.

In April later that year, Caldwell was elected as the councillor for Division 3 of the City of Gold Coast. He was re-elected in 2016, and then elected as the councillor for Division 4 in 2020.

During his time as councillor, in December 2012, while acting mayor of the Gold Coast, Caldwell was accused of assaulting a property developer at a charity function, allegedly grabbing him by the throat, which Caldwell denied.

=== 2023 Fadden by-election ===
Following the resignation of former minister Stuart Robert from parliament, Caldwell was selected as the LNP's candidate in Fadden for the by-election, defeating four other nominees in three rounds of voting. Caldwell stated that the by-election would be a way to send a message to Prime Minister Anthony Albanese on issues relating to the economy, saying that he knew he "can be the one they can support in order to deliver for our local community." He was successfully elected in the by-election on 15 July 2023.

== Political positions ==
Caldwell opposed the Labor government's proposed Indigenous Voice to Parliament and backed the Liberal Party's policy to oppose the proposal in the referendum.

Parliament of Australia
Preceded by Stuart Robert	Member for Fadden; 2023–present	Incumbent
