= Jodie Belyea =

Australian politician

Jodie Belyea MP
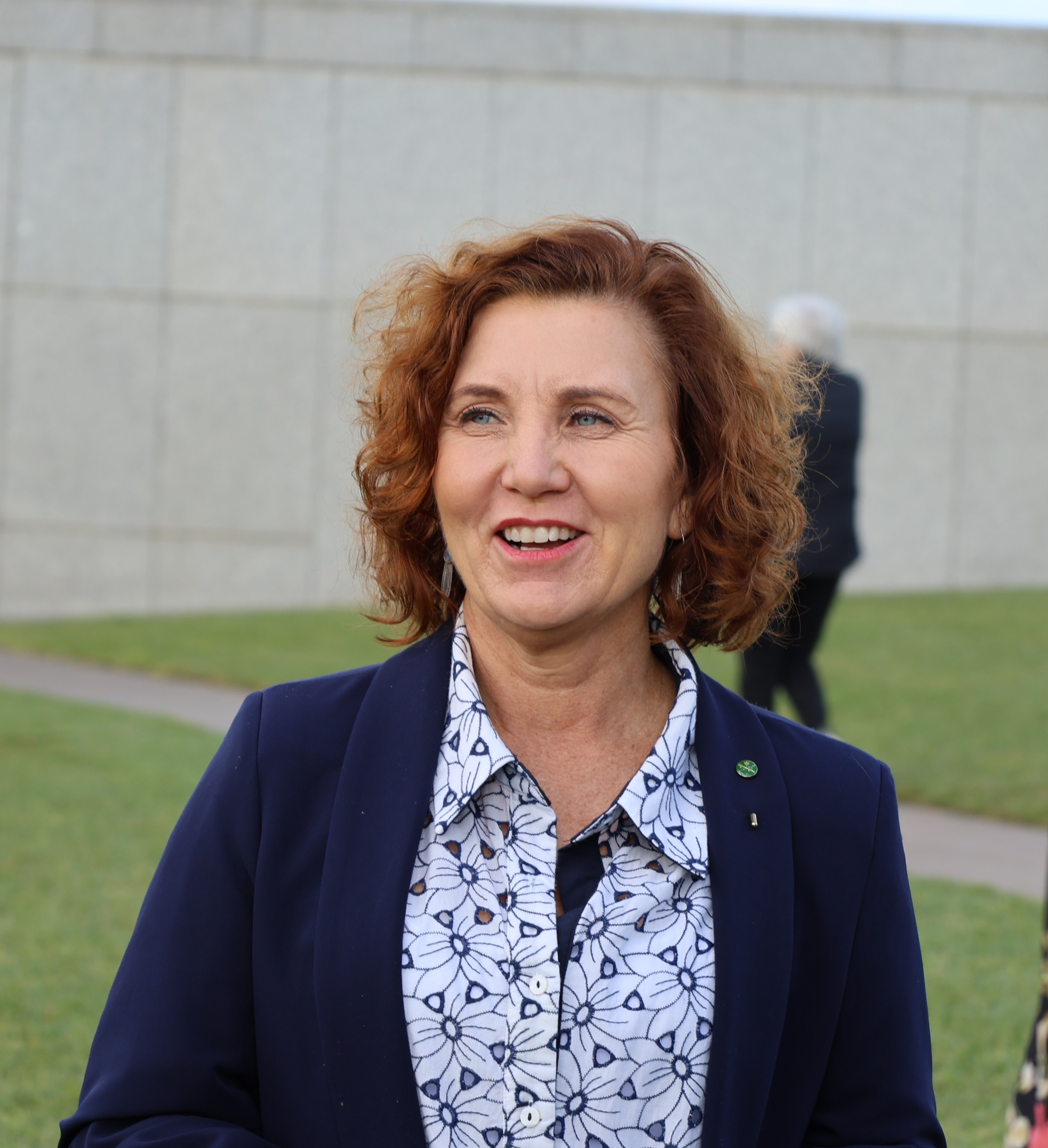
- Belyea in 2024

Member of the Australian Parliament for Dunkley
- Incumbent
- Assumed office 2 March 2024
- Preceded by: Peta Murphy

Personal details
- Born: 29 June 1967 (age 59)
- Party: Labor
- Education: Chisholm TAFE and RMIT University
- Occupation: Politician
- Website: jodiebelyea.com.au

Jodie Anne Belyea (/ˈbɛljeɪ/) (born 29 June 1967) is an Australian politician representing the Australian Labor Party. She was elected to the House of Representatives for the Victorian seat of Dunkley at a by-election in March 2024.

== Early career ==
In her early career, Jodie worked for Sussan and philanthropist Marc Besen.

Belyea studied at Chisholm TAFE and has a Master's in Leadership, Organisational Consulting and Change and undergraduate qualifications in Business Administration, Community Development and Youth Work. She also studied at RMIT University where she attained a Master's of Business Leadership.

In 2018, she founded the Women's Spirit Project, a grassroots volunteer-led project on the Mornington Peninsula with a vision to empower and support vulnerable women through fitness, health and wellbeing activities. She has worked with organisations including Anglicare Victoria.

== Political career ==
Belyea won the 2024 Dunkley by-election following the passing of former Member for Dunkley, Peta Murphy MP in December 2023. Belyea won 41.1% of the primary vote and 52.7% of the two party preferred vote.

In the 2025 Federal Election, she won an increased margin of 57.1% points of the two-party-preferred vote against Liberal candidate Nathan Conroy.

In the 48th Parliament of Australia, Jodie was elected Chair of 2 Parliamentary Committees: the Joint Standing Committee on Implementation of the National Redress Scheme and the Standing Committee on Petitions.

Jodie is an advocate for domestic and family violence (DFV) prevention, building more affordable and social housing, women's health and men's wellbeing.

== Personal life ==
Belyea lives in Frankston with her husband and son, Dave and Flynn, and dogs Winter and Molly. She enjoys walks on the Frankston foreshore, spending time in local nature and bushland, and morning swims at the beach.

Parliament of Australia
Preceded by Peta Murphy	Member for Dunkley; 2024–present	Incumbent
