= Division of Dunkley =

Australian federal electoral division

Coordinates: 38.170°S 145.138°E

Dunkley Australian House of Representatives Division
- Interactive map of electorate boundaries from the 2025 federal election
- Created: 1984
- MP: Jodie Belyea
- Party: Labor
- Namesake: Louisa Margaret Dunkley
- Electors: 124,407 (2025)
- Area: 148 km^{2} (57.1 sq mi)
- Demographic: Outer metropolitan and semi-rural
Electorates around Dunkley:
Port Phillip	Isaacs	Holt
Port Phillip	Dunkley	Holt
Port Phillip	Flinders	Flinders

The Division of Dunkley is an Australian electoral division in the state of Victoria. The division is located south-east of Melbourne on the Mornington Peninsula. It covers an area of approximately 148 square kilometres (57 sq mi) from Chelsea in the north to Mount Eliza in the south and Langwarrin South in the southeast. Jodie Belyea has represented the seat since the 2024 Dunkley by-election.

== List of localities in Dunkley ==
- Frankston (seat)
- Frankston South
- Frankston North
- Bonbeach
- Carrum
- Carrum Downs
- Chelsea
- Chelsea Heights
- Karingal
- Langwarrin
- Langwarrin South
- Mount Eliza
- Patterson Lakes
- Skye
- Sandhurst
- Seaford

== Geography ==
Since 1984, federal electoral division boundaries in Australia have been determined at redistributions by a redistribution committee appointed by the Australian Electoral Commission. Redistributions occur for the boundaries of divisions in a particular state, and they occur every seven years, or sooner if a state's representation entitlement changes or when divisions of a state are malapportioned.

As a result of a periodical boundary redistribution, from the 2025 Australian federal election, Dunkley’s boundaries will move north to include the suburbs of Carrum, Bonbeach, Patterson Lakes, Chelsea (part) and Chelsea Heights (part), while losing the southern part of Mount Eliza to neighbouring Flinders.

== History ==
The division was created in 1984 and is named for Louisa Margaret Dunkley, a trade unionist and campaigner for equal pay for women.

It was held by the Liberal Party from 1996 to 2019, however a 2018 boundary redistribution that favoured Labor, along with Labor's increased statewide strength in Victoria resulted in Peta Murphy winning the seat for the Labor Party at the 2019 Australian federal election.

== Members ==
Image	Member	Party	Term	Notes
	Bob Chynoweth (1941–)	Labor	1 December 1984 – 24 March 1990	Previously held the Division of Flinders. Lost seat
	Frank Ford (1936–)	Liberal	24 March 1990 – 13 March 1993	Lost seat
	Bob Chynoweth (1941–)	Labor	13 March 1993 – 2 March 1996	Lost seat
	Bruce Billson (1966–)	Liberal	2 March 1996 – 9 May 2016	Served as minister under Howard and Abbott. Retired
	Chris Crewther (1983–)	Liberal	2 July 2016 – 18 May 2019	Lost seat. Later elected to the Victorian Legislative Assembly seat of Mornington in 2022
	Peta Murphy (1973–2023)	Labor	18 May 2019 – 4 December 2023	Died in office
	Jodie Belyea (1967–)	Labor	2 March 2024 – present	Incumbent

== Election results ==
2025 Australian federal election: Dunkley
Party	Candidate	Votes	%	±%
Labor	Jodie Belyea	41,792	38.28	−2.17
Liberal	Nathan Conroy	35,288	32.32	+0.57
Greens	Matt Maber	12,649	11.59	+0.97
One Nation	Jessica Davis	7,494	6.86	+3.87
Legalise Cannabis	Lisa Abbott	5,243	4.80	+4.80
Independent	Robert Thurley	3,230	2.96	+2.96
Family First	Peter Nicholes	2,497	2.29	+2.29
Fusion	Andrew Gatley	981	0.90	+0.90
Total formal votes		109,174	95.15	−0.20
Informal votes		5,559	4.85	+0.20
Turnout		114,733	92.27	+3.34
Two-party-preferred result
Labor	Jodie Belyea	62,314	57.08	+0.31
Liberal	Nathan Conroy	46,860	42.92	−0.31
Labor hold		Swing	+0.31	
