= Peta Murphy =

Australian politician (1973–2023)

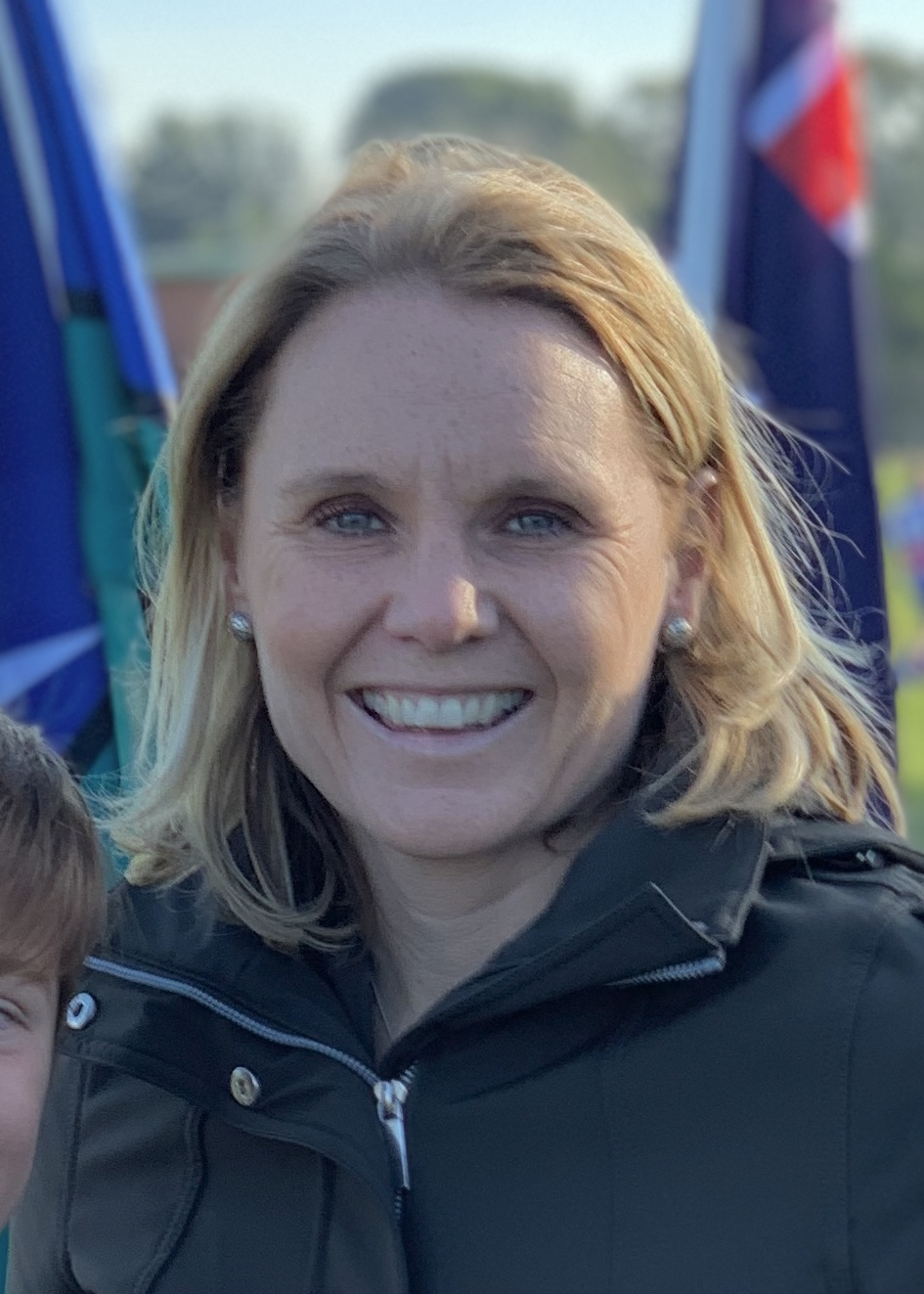
- Murphy in 2019

Member of the Australian Parliament for Dunkley
- In office 18 May 2019 – 4 December 2023
- Preceded by: Chris Crewther
- Succeeded by: Jodie Belyea

Personal details
- Born: Peta Jan Murphy; 1 November 1973 Goulburn, New South Wales, Australia
- Died: 4 December 2023 (aged 50) Frankston, Victoria, Australia
- Party: Labor
- Spouse: Rod Glover (m. 1999)
- Education: Australian National University; University of Melbourne
- Profession: Barrister
- Website: www.petamurphy.net

Peta Jan Murphy (1 November 1973 – 4 December 2023) was an Australian politician. She was a member of the House of Representatives from 2019 until her death in 2023, representing the Victorian seat of Dunkley for the Australian Labor Party (ALP).

== Early life and education ==
Peta Jan Murphy was born in Goulburn, New South Wales, on 1 November 1973. She held Bachelor of Science (Psychology) and Bachelor of Laws degrees from the Australian National University, and a Master of Criminology degree from the University of Melbourne.

== Early career ==
Prior to entering parliament, Murphy worked variously as a solicitor, barrister, Senior Public Defender at Victoria Legal Aid, Team Leader at the Victorian Law Reform Commission and as Chief of Staff to Labor Shadow Minister Brendan O'Connor MP.

== Politics ==
Murphy first stood for Dunkley at the 2016 election on the retirement of Bruce Billson, gaining a 4.1% swing but losing to Liberal candidate Chris Crewther.

Murphy ran again in the 2019 election and with the benefit of an electoral redistribution that turned Dunkley from a marginal Liberal seat into a notionally marginal Labor seat, along with a further 1.7% swing, was successful, becoming the first ALP member for Dunkley since 1996 and the first woman to represent the seat. She was a member of the House of Representatives Social and Legal Affairs Committee, the House of Representative Economics Committee and the House of Representatives Select Selection Committee.

Murphy was an advocate for breast screening and early diagnosis of cancer and in her maiden speech spoke of her commitment to healthcare and creating employment opportunities in Melbourne's outer suburbs.

Murphy worked with Breast Cancer Network Australia to promote better treatment and understanding of cancer. Along with Lucy Wicks, former Liberal member for Robertson, Murphy established the Parliamentary Friends of Women's Health in 2021 to provide a bi-partisan platform.

Murphy was re-elected with an increased margin at the 2022 Australian federal election.

In June 2023, as chair of a committee overseeing gambling reform, Murphy released the You win some, you lose more report which recommended an outright ban on all gambling advertising.

== Personal life ==
Murphy was born in Goulburn, New South Wales. She married Rod Glover in 1999.

Murphy played softball in the National League and represented NSW, ACT, Victoria and the Mornington Peninsula at the junior and senior level for squash. She was a past winner of the Australian 35+y Masters Squash, the US 35+y Masters Squash and the gold medal winner at the World Masters Games for 35+ years squash. She was a previous President of Squash Victoria, Vice President of Squash Australia and member of the World Squash Federation Governance and Audit Committee. Murphy also served on the board of local Community Legal Centres, Peninsula Health and the Peninsula Waves.

Murphy was the Patron of the Frankston City Bowls Club and the Frankston Vietnam Veterans Association.

== Health and death ==
Murphy was first diagnosed with breast cancer in 2011, at the age of 37. The cancer recurred around the time of her being sworn in to parliament in July 2019. She died from cancer at her home in Frankston on 4 December 2023, at the age of 50.

In February 2024, Prime Minister Anthony Albanese opened the new "Peta Murphy Breast Imaging Suite" at Frankston Hospital, in honour of Murphy's contribution to cancer awareness and advocacy.

Parliament of Australia
Preceded by Chris Crewther	Member for Dunkley; 2019–2023	Succeeded by Jodie Belyea
