= Electoral results for the Division of Aston =

Australian division election results

This is a list of electoral results for the Division of Aston in Australian federal elections from the division's creation in 1984 until the present.

== Members ==
Member	Party	Term
John Saunderson	Labor	1984–1990
Peter Nugent	Liberal	1990–2001
Chris Pearce	Liberal	2001–2010
Alan Tudge	Liberal	2010–2023
Mary Doyle	Labor	2023–present

== Election results ==
=== Elections in the 2020s ===
==== 2025 ====
2025 Australian federal election: Aston
Party	Candidate	Votes	%	±%
Liberal	Manny Cicchiello	41,382	37.67	−5.15
Labor	Mary Doyle	40,926	37.26	+4.75
Greens	Reuben Steen	12,669	11.53	−0.69
One Nation	John De Wacht	3,738	3.40	+0.34
Family First	Craig Manners	3,006	2.74	+2.74
Trumpet of Patriots	Steve Desveaux	2,526	2.30	+2.22
Independent	Mark Grondman	2,439	2.22	+2.22
Independent	Andrew Williams	2,104	1.92	+1.92
Libertarian	David Fawcett	1,059	0.96	−1.19
Total formal votes		109,849	94.97	−1.61
Informal votes		5,814	5.03	+1.61
Turnout		115,663	94.45	+1.90
Two-party-preferred result
Labor	Mary Doyle	58,690	53.43	+6.04
Liberal	Manny Cicchiello	51,159	46.57	−6.04
Labor gain from Liberal		Swing	+6.04	

==== 2023 by-election ====
2023 Aston by-election
Party	Candidate	Votes	%	±%
Labor	Mary Doyle	37,318	40.87	+8.32
Liberal	Roshena Campbell	35,680	39.07	–3.98
Greens	Angelica Di Camillo	9,256	10.14	–1.94
Independent	Maya Tesa	6,426	7.04	+7.04
Fusion	Owen Miller	2,637	2.89	+2.89
Total formal votes		91,317	96.70	−0.03
Informal votes		3,112	3.30	+0.03
Turnout		94,429	85.64	−6.86
Two-party-preferred result
Labor	Mary Doyle	48,915	53.57	+6.38
Liberal	Roshena Campbell	42,402	46.43	–6.38
Labor gain from Liberal		Swing	+6.38	

==== 2022 ====
2022 Australian federal election: Aston
Party	Candidate	Votes	%	±%
Liberal	Alan Tudge	42,260	43.05	−11.64
Labor	Mary Doyle	31,949	32.55	+2.74
Greens	Asher Cookson	11,855	12.08	+3.22
United Australia	Rebekah Spelman	5,990	6.10	+2.49
One Nation	Craig Ibbotson	3,022	3.08	+3.08
Liberal Democrats	Liam Roche	2,111	2.15	+2.15
TNL	Ryan Bruce	973	0.99	+0.99
Total formal votes		98,160	96.73	+0.41
Informal votes		3,320	3.27	−0.41
Turnout		101,480	92.50	−1.79
Two-party-preferred result
Liberal	Alan Tudge	51,840	52.81	−7.32
Labor	Mary Doyle	46,320	47.19	+7.32
Liberal hold		Swing	−7.32	

Alluvial diagram for preference flows in the seat of Aston in the 2022 federal election. indicates at what stage the winning candidate had over 50% of the votes and was declared the winner.

=== Elections in the 2010s ===
==== 2019 ====
2019 Australian federal election: Aston
Party	Candidate	Votes	%	±%
Liberal	Alan Tudge	54,744	54.69	+5.24
Labor	Kadira Pethiyagoda	29,839	29.81	−1.17
Greens	Asher Cookson	8,867	8.86	−0.14
United Australia	Matthew Sirianni-Duffy	3,611	3.61	+3.61
Democratic Labour	Anna Kennedy	3,029	3.03	+3.03
Total formal votes		100,090	96.32	+0.52
Informal votes		3,829	3.68	−0.52
Turnout		103,919	94.18	−0.69
Two-party-preferred result
Liberal	Alan Tudge	60,180	60.13	+2.72
Labor	Kadira Pethiyagoda	39,910	39.87	−2.72
Liberal hold		Swing	+2.72	

==== 2016 ====
2016 Australian federal election: Aston
Party	Candidate	Votes	%	±%
Liberal	Alan Tudge	43,532	50.86	−0.73
Labor	Paul Klisaris	26,593	31.07	−1.56
Greens	Steve Raymond	7,186	8.40	+2.52
Family First	Daniel Martin	2,762	3.23	+0.46
Animal Justice	Rosemary Lavin	2,211	2.58	+2.58
Independent	Daniel Huppert	2,104	2.46	+2.46
Liberal Democrats	Joel Moore	1,198	1.40	+1.40
Total formal votes		85,586	96.04	+0.57
Informal votes		3,525	3.96	−0.57
Turnout		89,111	92.78	−1.95
Two-party-preferred result
Liberal	Alan Tudge	50,142	58.59	+0.39
Labor	Paul Klisaris	35,444	41.41	−0.39
Liberal hold		Swing	+0.39	

==== 2013 ====
2013 Australian federal election: Aston
Party	Candidate	Votes	%	±%
Liberal	Alan Tudge	44,030	51.59	+6.04
Labor	Rupert Evans	27,850	32.63	−6.71
Greens	Steve Raymond	5,017	5.88	−3.89
Palmer United	Bradley Watt	3,206	3.76	+3.76
Family First	Tony Foster	2,362	2.77	−1.89
Sex Party	Charity Jenkins	2,295	2.69	+2.15
Rise Up Australia	Jennifer Speer	581	0.68	+0.68
Total formal votes		85,341	95.47	+0.04
Informal votes		4,047	4.53	−0.04
Turnout		89,388	94.80	−0.15
Two-party-preferred result
Liberal	Alan Tudge	49,672	58.20	+7.53
Labor	Rupert Evans	35,669	41.80	−7.53
Liberal hold		Swing	+7.53	

==== 2010 ====
2010 Australian federal election: Aston
Party	Candidate	Votes	%	±%
Liberal	Alan Tudge	39,733	46.85	−3.86
Labor	Rupert Evans	32,725	38.58	−0.26
Greens	Salore Craig	8,206	9.67	+4.44
Family First	Rachel Hanna	4,153	4.90	+1.43
Total formal votes		84,817	95.65	−1.41
Informal votes		3,854	4.35	+1.41
Turnout		88,671	94.89	−1.50
Two-party-preferred result
Liberal	Alan Tudge	43,901	51.76	−3.29
Labor	Rupert Evans	40,916	48.24	+3.29
Liberal hold		Swing	−3.29	

=== Elections in the 2000s ===
==== 2007 ====
2007 Australian federal election: Aston
Party	Candidate	Votes	%	±%
Liberal	Chris Pearce	43,519	50.71	−7.84
Labor	Gerry Raleigh	33,332	38.84	+7.67
Greens	Adam Pepper	4,492	5.23	+0.37
Family First	Peter Lake	2,978	3.47	+0.66
Democrats	Rachal Aza	1,246	1.45	+0.22
Citizens Electoral Council	Doug Mitchell	245	0.29	−0.39
Total formal votes		85,812	97.06	+1.26
Informal votes		2,601	2.94	−1.26
Turnout		88,413	96.35	+0.34
Two-party-preferred result
Liberal	Chris Pearce	47,243	55.05	−8.10
Labor	Gerry Raleigh	38,569	44.95	+8.10
Liberal hold		Swing	−8.10	

==== 2004 ====
2004 Australian federal election: Aston
Party	Candidate	Votes	%	±%
Liberal	Chris Pearce	47,686	58.55	+7.89
Labor	Paul Morgan	25,384	31.17	−6.03
Greens	Michael Abson	3,957	4.86	+1.32
Family First	Peter Nathan	2,290	2.81	+2.81
Democrats	Nahum Ayliffe	998	1.23	−5.77
No GST	Nevil Brewer	573	0.70	+0.70
Citizens Electoral Council	Doug Mitchell	557	0.68	+0.35
Total formal votes		81,445	95.80	−0.96
Informal votes		3,570	4.20	+0.96
Turnout		85,015	96.01	−0.43
Two-party-preferred result
Liberal	Chris Pearce	51,436	63.15	+7.13
Labor	Paul Morgan	30,009	36.85	−7.13
Liberal hold		Swing	+7.13	

==== 2001 ====
2001 Australian federal election: Aston
Party	Candidate	Votes	%	±%
Liberal	Chris Pearce	42,973	50.78	+2.29
Labor	Kieran Boland	31,269	36.95	−1.56
Democrats	Ruth Kendall	5,952	7.03	−0.49
Greens	Mick Kir	3,062	3.62	+3.62
Christian Democrats	Ray Levick	1,074	1.27	+1.27
Citizens Electoral Council	Doug Mitchell	290	0.34	+0.34
Total formal votes		84,620	96.82	−0.35
Informal votes		2,782	3.18	+0.35
Turnout		87,402	97.12	
Two-party-preferred result
Liberal	Chris Pearce	47,531	56.17	+1.93
Labor	Kieran Boland	37,089	43.83	−1.93
Liberal hold		Swing	+1.93	

==== 2001 by-election ====
2001 Aston by-election
Party	Candidate	Votes	%	±%
Liberal	Chris Pearce	31,640	40.73	−7.76
Labor	Kieran Boland	28,716	36.96	−1.55
Democrats	Pierre Harcourt	6,271	8.07	+0.54
Independent	Garry Scates	3,401	4.38	+4.38
Greens	Mick Kir	1,877	2.42	+2.42
One Nation	June Scott	1,369	1.76	−1.13
Independent	Peter O'Loughlin	1,160	1.49	+1.49
HEMP	Graeme Dunstan	711	0.92	+0.92
Liberals for Forests	Luke James Chamberlain	680	0.88	+0.88
No GST	Mark Sloan	618	0.80	+0.80
Citizens Electoral Council	Doug Mitchell	334	0.43	+0.43
	Josephine Cox	328	0.42	+0.42
Independent	Steve Raskovy	227	0.29	+0.29
Hope	Tim Petherbridge	232	0.30	+0.30
	Mark Ward	126	0.16	+0.16
Total formal votes		77,690	94.16	−3.01
Informal votes		4,819	5.84	+3.01
Turnout		82,509	92.54	−4.10
Two-party-preferred result
Liberal	Chris Pearce	39,299	50.58	−3.66
Labor	Kieran Boland	38,391	49.42	+3.66
Liberal hold		Swing	−3.66	

=== Elections in the 1990s ===
==== 1998 ====
1998 Australian federal election: Aston
Party	Candidate	Votes	%	±%
Liberal	Peter Nugent	38,645	48.49	−3.10
Labor	Peter Lockwood	30,689	38.51	−0.18
Democrats	Darrell Stosegan	6,000	7.53	−1.38
One Nation	Ian Cameron	2,306	2.89	+2.89
Unity	Guosheng Chen	1,371	1.72	+1.72
Reform	Paul Rigoni	685	0.86	+0.86
Total formal votes		79,696	97.17	−0.43
Informal votes		2,324	2.83	+0.43
Turnout		82,020	96.64	−0.38
Two-party-preferred result
Liberal	Peter Nugent	43,227	54.24	−1.35
Labor	Peter Lockwood	36,469	45.76	+1.35
Liberal hold		Swing	−1.35	

==== 1996 ====
1996 Australian federal election: Aston
Party	Candidate	Votes	%	±%
Liberal	Peter Nugent	39,027	51.59	+1.50
Labor	Michael Hailey	29,266	38.69	−4.61
Democrats	Damian Wise	6,739	8.91	+5.02
Natural Law	James McCarron	611	0.81	−0.04
Total formal votes		75,643	97.60	+0.16
Informal votes		1,862	2.40	−0.16
Turnout		77,505	97.02	+0.12
Two-party-preferred result
Liberal	Peter Nugent	41,909	55.59	+3.02
Labor	Michael Hailey	33,485	44.41	−3.02
Liberal hold		Swing	+3.02	

==== 1993 ====
1993 Australian federal election: Aston
Party	Candidate	Votes	%	±%
Liberal	Peter Nugent	36,747	49.19	+0.81
Labor	Sue Craven	32,904	44.04	+7.74
Democrats	Damian Wise	2,960	3.96	−8.95
Call to Australia	Christine Chapman	1,483	1.98	−0.43
Natural Law	Andrew Parry	617	0.83	+0.83
Total formal votes		74,711	97.40	+0.37
Informal votes		1,991	2.60	−0.37
Turnout		76,702	96.90	
Two-party-preferred result
Liberal	Peter Nugent	38,762	51.92	−2.71
Labor	Sue Craven	35,896	48.08	+2.71
Liberal hold		Swing	−2.71	

==== 1990 ====
1990 Australian federal election: Aston
Party	Candidate	Votes	%	±%
Liberal	Peter Nugent	32,968	48.4	+5.6
Labor	John Saunderson	24,738	36.3	−11.1
Democrats	Damian Wise	8,802	12.9	+4.8
Call to Australia	Michael Ryan	1,643	2.4	+2.4
Total formal votes		68,151	97.0	
Informal votes		2,085	3.0	
Turnout		70,236	96.8	
Two-party-preferred result
Liberal	Peter Nugent	37,204	54.6	+7.2
Labor	John Saunderson	30,901	45.4	−7.2
Liberal gain from Labor		Swing	+7.2	

=== Elections in the 1980s ===
==== 1987 ====
1987 Australian federal election: Aston
Party	Candidate	Votes	%	±%
Labor	John Saunderson	30,817	48.4	−2.7
Liberal	Gordon Ashley	26,595	41.8	+2.4
Democrats	Jan Bricknell	5,134	8.1	+1.2
National	Hugh Gurney	1,113	1.8	+1.8
Total formal votes		63,659	95.2	
Informal votes		3,207	4.8	
Turnout		66,866	95.8	
Two-party-preferred result
Labor	John Saunderson	34,099	53.6	−2.9
Liberal	Gordon Ashley	29,547	46.4	+2.9
Labor hold		Swing	−2.9	

==== 1984 ====
1984 Australian federal election: Aston
Party	Candidate	Votes	%	±%
Labor	John Saunderson	28,926	51.1	+0.1
Liberal	Rob Llewellyn	22,286	39.4	+2.1
Democrats	Harry Eichler	3,920	6.9	−1.4
Democratic Labor	Robert Garratt	1,433	2.5	+0.7
Total formal votes		56,565	92.3	
Informal votes		4,710	7.7	
Turnout		61,275	95.8	
Two-party-preferred result
Labor	John Saunderson	31,919	56.5	−0.5
Liberal	Rob Llewellyn	24,612	43.5	+0.5
Labor notional hold		Swing	−0.5	
