= Sanderson (surname) =

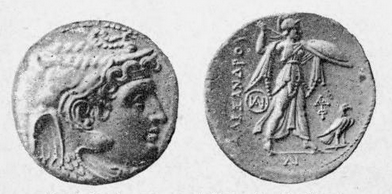
- Coin depicting Alexander IV of Macedon, the "son of" Alexander the Great

Origin
- Language: English
- Meaning: Son of Alexander (name) – "Alexander’s son"
- Region of origin: England and Scotland

Other names
- Variant forms: Saunderson, Sandeson, Sandersen, Sandison, Sandersson, MacAlister, MacSandair

Sanderson is a surname of Scottish and English origin.

In Scotland, entries were first found in the 15th century. "Johannes Sandrison was witness in Kyncardyn, 1434. John Sanderson bought the Temple lands of Lethindy in 1472. William Sanderissone and Vmfra Sanderissone were summoned in 1479 to answer to parliament for treason."

In England, the Sanderson surname was first found in county Durham. People with this surname were descended from Alexander, a Norman noble who had been granted lands in Waslington in the county of Durham and whose son took the surname James Saunderson. Whorlton in Durham was home to one branch of the family. "This place formed part of the forfeited estates of the Earl of Westmorland, and was purchased from the commissioners of the crown lands; the manor subsequently became the property of the Sanderson family."

Also the parish of Saxby in Lincolnshire was home to the family since early times. "This place has long been in the possession of the Saundersons, now represented by the Earl of Scarborough.

Ireland was an early home to many of the family. "The Saundersons of co. Cavan are descended from Alexander de Bedick of Waslington, co. Durham, whose son, James de Bedick, used the alias of Saunderson, from his father's Christian name. His descendants settled in the shires of Nottingham and Lincoln, and it is from the latter county that the Saundersons just mentioned derive themselves. The family of this name in co. Wicklow, claim that their ancestor came into England about the year 1270, and that he sprang 'from Robert, Lord of Innspruck, who was second brother of Rodolph, Count of Hapsburgh, and subsequently Emperor.' The founder of the family in Ireland was a follower of Cromwell."

== Frequency and distribution ==
- Most prevalent in: United States – 28,922 people.
- Highest density in: Norfolk Island – (ratio 1: 288) 49th most common surname.

1881 distribution
Country	Population	Rank	Ratio/freq
England	10,978	316	1: 2,220
Scotland	1,376	473	1: 2,720
Wales	51	1,694	1: 30,753
Isle of Man	3	1,402	1: 18,090

2014 distribution
Country	Population	Rank	Ratio/freq
United States	28,922	1,343	1: 11,074
England	16,692	386	1: 3,235
Canada	6,413	770	1: 5,524
Australia	4,950	612	1: 4,761
South Africa	2,995	2,172	1: 18,031
Brazil	1,654	8,373	1: 122,736
Scotland	1,418	595	1: 3,738
New Zealand	821	841	1: 5,538
Jamaica	821	481	1: 3,311
France	453	21,615	1: 145,605

== People with the surname ==
- Alex Sanderson, (born 1979), English rugby union player, brother of Pat Sanderson
- Amy Sanderson, (1876–1931), Scottish suffragette
- Bill Sanderson, (born 1959), Tennessee politician
- Brandon Sanderson (born 1975), American fantasy author
- Brenton Sanderson, (born 1974), Australian rules football player and coach
- Cael Sanderson, (born 1979), American amateur wrestler
- Chris Sanderson, (c. 1974–2012), Canadian lacrosse coach and player
- Christian C. Sanderson, (1882–1966), southeastern Pennsylvania historian
- Danny Sanderson, (born 1950), Israeli musician
- Derek Sanderson, (born 1946), Canadian former ice hockey player
- Douglas Mark Sanderson, member of the Governing Body of Jehovah's Witnesses
- Edward Sanderson (disambiguation), several people
- Ezra Dwight Sanderson (1878–1944), American entomologist and sociologist
- F. W. Sanderson (1857–1922), British headmaster of Oundle School
- Geoff Sanderson, (born 1972), Canadian former ice hockey player
- George Sanderson (disambiguation)
- Gerald Sanderson (1881–1864), English cricketer
- Gordon Sanderson (1950–1977), Canadian murder victim
- Grant Sanderson, math YouTuber
- Ivan T. Sanderson, (1911–1973), Scottish-American biologist and writer
- Jake Sanderson (born 2002), American ice hockey player
- James Sanderson (disambiguation), several people
- Jesse O. Sanderson, founder of the Sanderson High School in North Carolina, USA
- Joan Sanderson, (1912–1992), British actress
- John Sanderson, (born 1940), Australian military officer and politician
- John Burdon-Sanderson, (1828–1905), English physiologist
- Josh Sanderson, (born 1977), Canadian lacrosse player
- Kate Sanderson, married name Kate Gerbeau, (born 1968), English television broadcaster
- Kate Sanderson (born 2000), Canadian Olympic swimmer
- Keith Sanderson (born 1975), American sport shooter
- Kerry Sanderson (born 1950), Australian businesswoman and public servant
- Lianne Sanderson (born 1988), English footballer
- Marie Sanderson (1921–2010), Canadian climatologist
- Martyn Sanderson, (1938-2009), New Zealand actor
- Nikki Sanderson, (born 1984), English actress
- Ninian Sanderson, (1925–1985), Scottish race car driver
- Oswald Sanderson, (1863–1926), American businessman and director of Thomas Wilson Sons & Co. and Ellerman's Wilson Line
- Pamela Sanderson, American politician
- Pat Sanderson, (born 1977), English rugby union player, brother of Alex Sanderson
- Paul Sanderson (footballer) (born 1964), English footballer
- Paul Sanderson (volleyball) (born 1986), Australian volleyball player
- Peter Sanderson, (born 1952), American comic book critic and historian
- Peter Sanderson (tailor), (c. 16th–17th Century), Scottish tailor
- Phil Sanderson, (born 1977), Canadian lacrosse player
- Reggie Sanderson (born 1950), American football player
- Robert Sanderson (disambiguation), several people
- Russell Sanderson, Baron Sanderson of Bowden (1933–2026), Scottish politician
- Scott Sanderson (disambiguation), several people
- Silas Sanderson, (1924–1886), American judge
- Sibyl Sanderson, (1864–1903), American opera singer
- T. J. Cobden-Sanderson, (1840–1922), English artist and bookbinder
- Terry Sanderson (writer), (1946–2022), British writer and LGBT rights activist
- Terry Sanderson (lacrosse), (1952–2014), Canadian lacrosse coach
- Tessa Sanderson, (born 1956), British athlete and Olympic champion
- William Sanderson (disambiguation), multiple people
- Ubiratan Antunes Sanderson, (1969) a brazilian federal deputy

== Fictional characters ==
- George Sanderson, character from the Pixar animated film Monsters, Inc.
- Major Sanderson, character in the Joseph Heller novel Catch-22
- Dave Sanderson, character in the Parks and Recreation TV series
- Ben Sanderson, character in the film Leaving Las Vegas
- Peter Sanderson, character in the 2003 film Bringing Down the House
- Raymond Sanderson, character in the film Harvey
- Sgt. Gary “Roach” Sanderson, a protagonist in the 2009 video game Call of Duty: Modern Warfare 2
- Olaf Sanderson, fictional Icelandic ice hockey player in the film The Mighty Ducks
- The Sanderson Sisters (Winifred, Mary and Sarah), from the movies Hocus Pocus and Hocus Pocus 2.
- Sanderson, a pixie who works with Head Pixie in the cartoon The Fairly OddParents

== See also ==
- Baron Sanderson of Ayot
- Jeppesen Sanderson, American company specialized in navigational information, operations planning tools, flight planning products and software
- Sanders (surname)
