= Aston by-election =

Aston by-election may refer to:

- 2001 Aston by-election, 2001 Australian by-election
- 2023 Aston by-election, 2023 Australian by-election
