= Cobden-Sanderson =

Cobden-Sanderson may refer to:

- Anne Cobden-Sanderson (1853–1926), British socialist, suffragette and vegetarian; wife of T. J. Cobden-Sanderson
- T. J. Cobden-Sanderson (1840–1922), English artist and bookbinder; husband of Anne Cobden-Sanderson

== See also ==
- Cobden (disambiguation)
- Sanderson (disambiguation)
