= 2023 Aston by-election =

- 1 April 2023

Division of Aston (Victoria) in the House of Representatives
- Registered: 110,331
- Turnout: 85.64% (▼6.86)
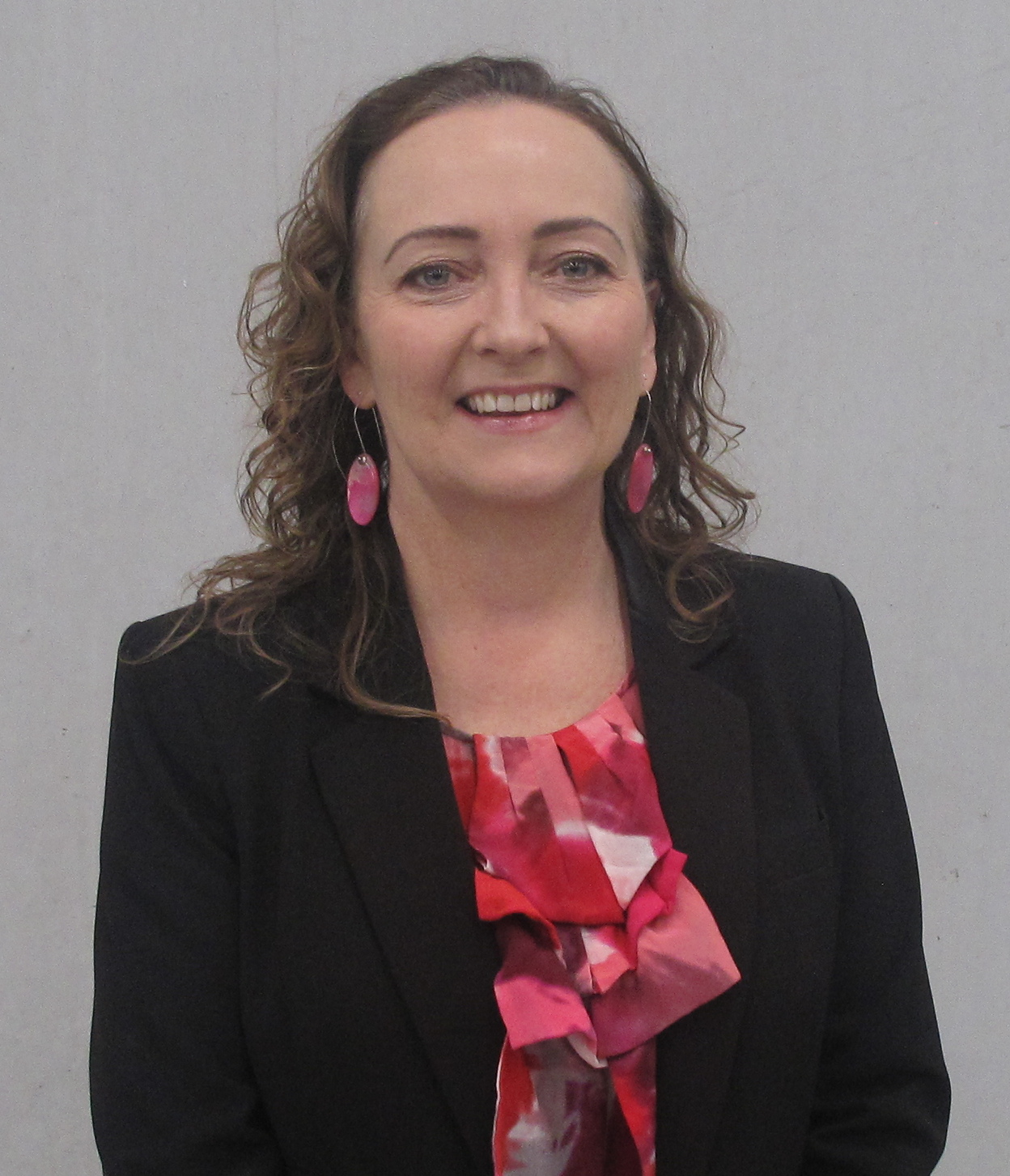

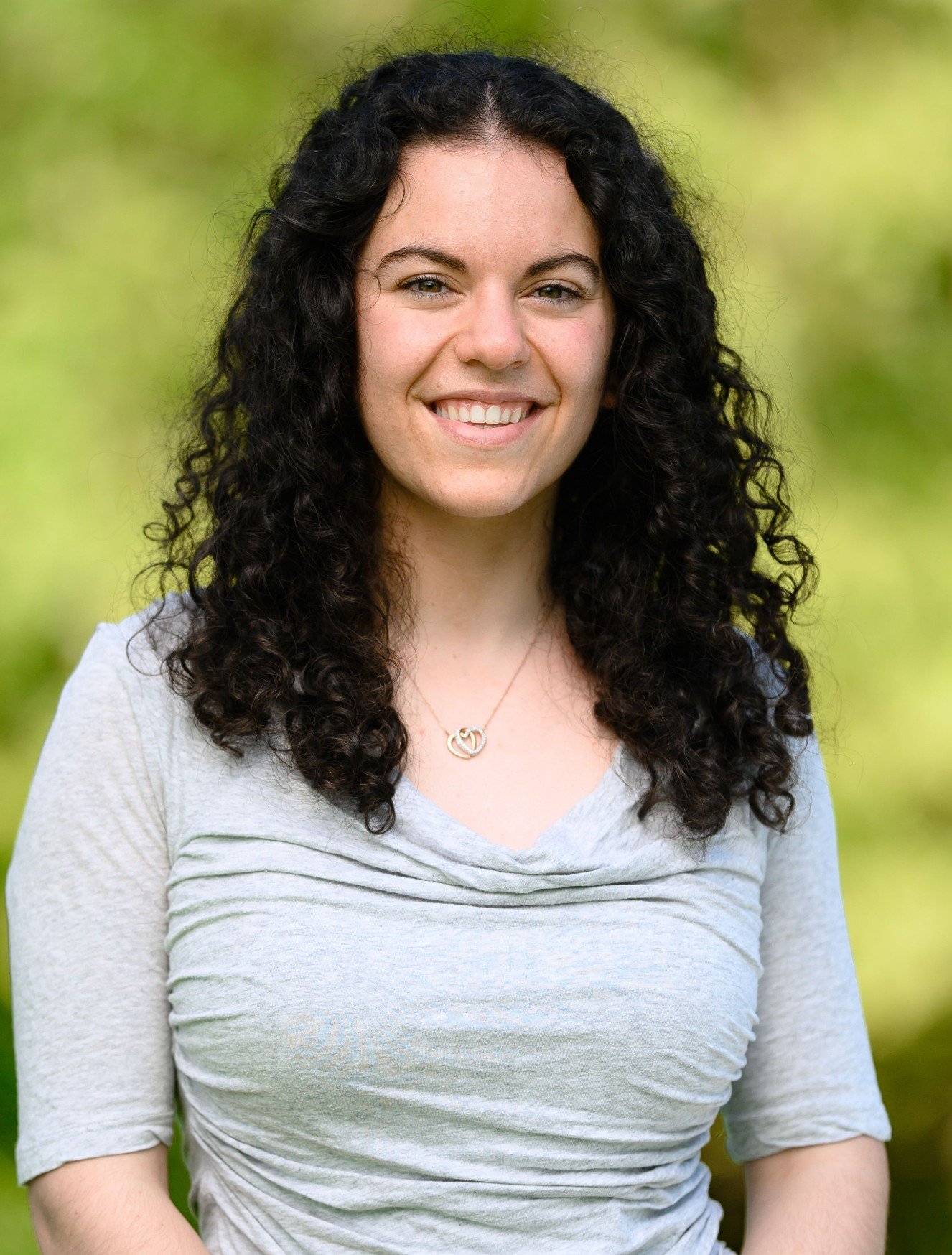
| | First party | Second party | Third party |
|---|---|---|---|
| Candidate | Mary Doyle | Roshena Campbell | Angelica Di Camillo |
| Party | Labor | Liberal | Greens |
| Primary vote | 37,318 | 35,680 | 9,256 |
| Percentage | 40.87% | 39.07% | 10.14% |
| Swing | ▲8.32 | ▼3.98 | ▼1.94 |
| TPP | 53.57% | 46.43% |
| TPP swing | ▲6.38 | ▼6.38 |
- Results of the by-election by suburb
MP before election
Alan Tudge
Liberal
Elected MP
Mary Doyle
Labor

The 2023 Aston by-election was held on 1 April 2023 to elect the next member of the Australian House of Representatives in the electorate of Aston in Victoria. The by-election was triggered by the resignation of Liberal MP Alan Tudge on 17 February 2023.

The ABC's Antony Green called Aston for Labor candidate Mary Doyle at 8:16pm AEDT. The result was considered a historic upset by the media, as Aston had been regarded as a safe seat for the Liberals, and had been held by the party since the 1990 federal election. It marked the first time in over 102 years that a government has won a seat from the opposition in a by-election.

== Background ==
The Division of Aston had been held by the Liberal party since the 1990 Australian federal election. In 2010, with the retirement of Chris Pearce, Alan Tudge won the division for the Liberals at the 2010 Australian federal election. The division remained safe during Tudge's tenure, including at the 2019 federal election.

In November 2020, a Four Corners episode revealed that Tudge was engaged in an extramarital affair with one of his staffers, Rachelle Miller. In December 2021, Tudge announced he would be standing aside as the Minister for Education after Prime Minister Scott Morrison announced an investigation into allegations made by Miller that Tudge had abused her in their relationship. Miller received A$650,000 from the government as a settlement. In April 2022, Morrison stated that Tudge "technically" was still part of the cabinet; however, in May acting education minister Stuart Robert stated he had been working in Tudge's role for "12 months", six months before Tudge had announced he would stand aside.

Two-party-preferred vote in Aston, 1996–2022
| Election | 1996 | 1998 | 2001 (b/e) | 2001 | 2004 | 2007 | 2010 | 2013 | 2016 | 2019 | 2022 |
|---|---|---|---|---|---|---|---|---|---|---|---|
| Liberal | 55.59% | 54.24% | 50.58% | 56.17% | 63.15% | 55.05% | 51.76% | 58.20% | 58.59% | 60.13% | 52.81% |
| Labor | 44.41% | 45.76% | 49.42% | 43.87% | 36.85% | 44.05% | 48.24% | 42.80% | 42.41% | 39.87% | 47.19% |
| Government | L/NP | L/NP | L/NP | L/NP | L/NP | ALP | ALP | L/NP | L/NP | L/NP | ALP |

=== 2022 election result ===
During the campaign for the 2022 federal election, Tudge stated he would happily return to being a minister if the coalition government was re-elected. The seat became marginal at the 2022 election; the 2PP swing to Labor in Aston was 7.32%, significantly higher than the state-wide swing to Labor of 1.69%. His Labor opponent was former union organiser Mary Doyle. The Greens also contested the election and had a 3.2% increase in primary vote from the previous 2019 election. Other parties that contested Aston at the 2022 election were the United Australia Party, One Nation, Liberal Democrats and TNL, and each of them achieved less than 10% of the primary vote.

As minister for Human Services in 2016–2017, Tudge was involved in setting up the Robodebt scheme, later found to have been illegal. The Albanese government set up a Royal Commission into the Robodebt scheme after taking office. Tudge appeared before the Royal Commission into the Robodebt Scheme on 1 February 2023 and denied he was responsible for seeking legal advice about the scheme's legality. A week later, on 9 February 2023, Tudge announced his resignation as the member for Aston.

The by-election was quickly labelled as key for the Coalition, who were in opposition at the federal level, and had performed poorly in recent Victorian elections. As of the date of this election, the last time a government had won a seat from the Opposition at a by-election was the Kalgoorlie by-election in 1920.

== Candidate selections ==
On 17 February 2023, the ALP selected Mary Doyle as its candidate for the by-election. She had been the party's candidate against Tudge at the 2022 federal election and won preselection unopposed.

On 21 February 2023, the Liberal Party selected Roshena Campbell as its candidate for the by-election. She was selected by the state party's administration committee, a decision taken to avoid the lengthy process of a members' ballot given the relatively short timeframe of the election. If she was elected, Campbell would have been the first female Indian-Australian MP from the Liberal Party. Other candidates for Liberal Party preselection included former state Liberal MP Cathrine Burnett-Wake, former Knox City mayor Emanuele Cicchiello, and oncologist and writer Ranjana Srivastava, who was endorsed by former premier of Victoria Jeff Kennett and former Minister for Health and Aged Care Greg Hunt. News of Tudge's resignation had also prompted speculation that former treasurer Josh Frydenberg, who lost his seat of Kooyong at the 2022 election, would seek the Liberal Party endorsement for the by-election. However, Frydenberg declined to seek re-election, having since moved to the private sector. Frydenberg endorsed Roshena Campbell.

At the time of their preselections, neither Campbell nor Doyle lived in the seat of Aston. Campbell lived in the inner-city suburb of Brunswick. She rented a property in the electorate and had promised to move to the electorate if elected. Doyle lived in the suburb of Mitcham, located in the nearby Deakin electorate.

The Australian Greens selected environmental engineer Angelica Di Camillo who had stood for the Greens in Rowville for the 2022 Victorian state election. She grew up in Rowville.

== Key dates ==
The key dates in relation to the by-election were:

- 27 February 2023 – Issue of writ
- 6 March 2023 – Close of electoral rolls
- 9 March 2023 – Close of nominations
- 10 March 2023 – Declaration of nominations
- 20 March 2023 – Start of early voting
- 29 March 2023 – Postal vote applications close
- 1 April 2023 – Polling day (8am to 6pm)
- 6 April 2023 – Declaration of result
- 14 April 2023 – Last day for receipt of postal votes
- 7 June 2023 – Last day for return of writs

== Candidates ==
| Party | Candidate | Background |
|---|---|---|
| Fusion | Owen Miller | Tech entrepreneur, artificial intelligence advocate |
| Liberal | Roshena Campbell | Barrister and City of Melbourne councillor |
| Greens | Angelica Di Camillo | Environmental engineer and pilates instructor, Rowville candidate in the 2022 state election |
| Labor | Mary Doyle | Union organiser, Aston candidate in the 2022 federal election |
| Independent | Maya Tesa | Businesswoman, Liberal Democratic candidate for North-Eastern Metropolitan in the 2022 state election and Jagajaga in the 2022 federal election; endorsed by the LDP |

One Nation chose not to contest the by-election, with party leader Pauline Hanson stating she had made a "strategic decision not to take votes away from the Coalition".

Simon Holmes à Court, founder of Climate 200, had expressed interest in funding a community-based teal independent if one were to run; this did not eventuate.

The Conservative Party, an unregistered party, endorsed volunteer community radio presenter Mark Gardner as a candidate but he did not end up contesting.

== Campaign ==
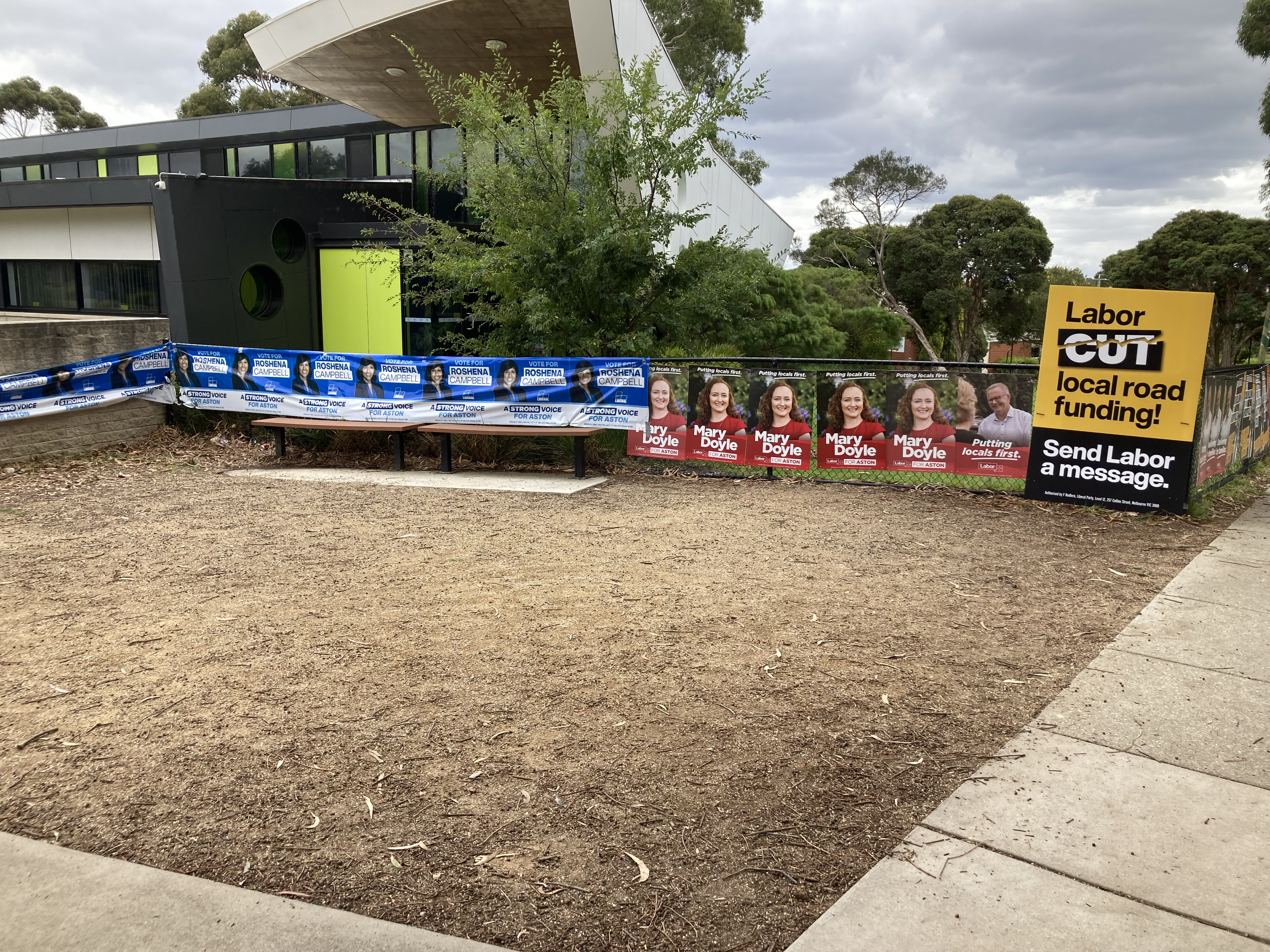
Election posters at a polling place, including one by the Liberals on the Labor government's cuts to local road funding

Labor's election poster campaigning against Peter Dutton's leadership of the Liberal party

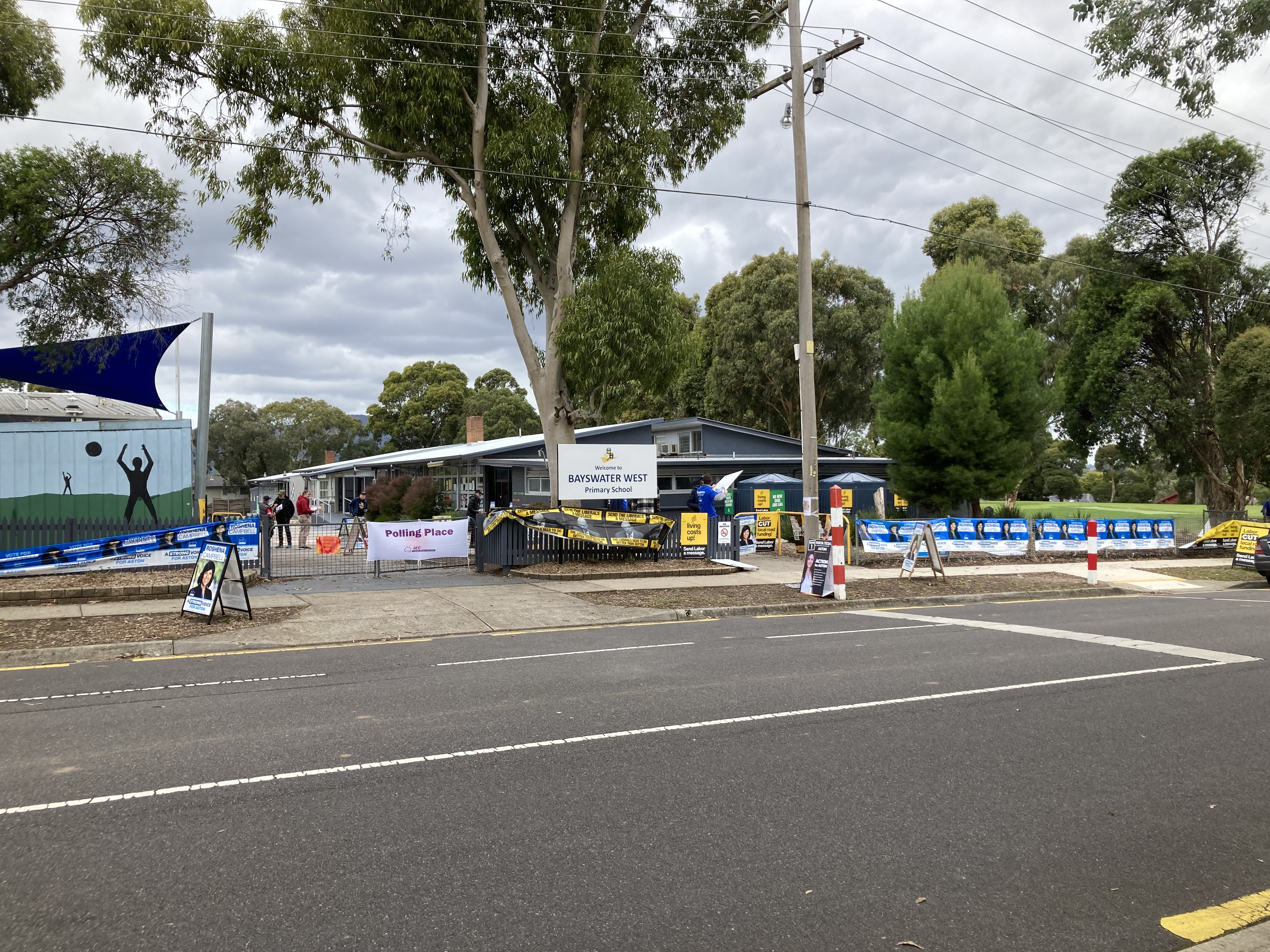
A polling place for the by-election at Bayswater West Primary School

Labor campaigned on issues including the resignation of former member Tudge, the Robodebt scandal, Peter Dutton's leadership of the Liberal party, and cost of living. Labor also highlighted Dutton's rhetoric critical of China in messaging to Chinese Australians. The Labor Party also highlighted the fact that Campbell did not live in the outer eastern suburbs of Melbourne where the seat is located.

The Liberal Party campaigned on issues including the rising cost of living and the withdrawal of funding to local road and transport projects under the new Albanese Labor government. These projects included the Dorset Road extension, Wellington Road duplication, Napoleon Road duplication and the proposed Rowville railway line (also known as Monash Rail).

A week before the election, the state Liberal Party attracted controversy when one of its state MPs, Moira Deeming, attended an anti-transgender protest which was also attended by neo-Nazis. The parliamentary leader of the state Liberal Party, John Pesutto, moved to expel Deeming from the party, but was unsuccessful. Dutton was concerned that these events from the state party could impact the party's results at the by-election. On 27 March, Dutton sent a WhatsApp message to Pesutto saying "John for the sake of [the] Aston [by-election] could we pls put this issue to bed today. No more media pls". In private discussion with colleagues, Pesutto said that he could "see the feds [federal Liberal party] blaming me for Aston" so "lying low" was the best approach.

== Results ==
2023 Aston by-election
| Party | Candidate | Votes | % | ±% |
|---|---|---|---|---|
| Labor | Mary Doyle | 37,318 | 40.87 | +8.32 |
| Liberal | Roshena Campbell | 35,680 | 39.07 | –3.98 |
| Greens | Angelica Di Camillo | 9,256 | 10.14 | –1.94 |
| Independent | Maya Tesa | 6,426 | 7.04 | +7.04 |
| Fusion | Owen Miller | 2,637 | 2.89 | +2.89 |
| Total formal votes | | 91,317 | 96.70 | −0.03 |
| Informal votes | | 3,112 | 3.30 | +0.03 |
| Turnout | | 94,429 | 85.64 | −6.86 |
Two-party-preferred result
| Labor | Mary Doyle | 48,915 | 53.57 | +6.38 |
| Liberal | Roshena Campbell | 42,402 | 46.43 | –6.38 |
| Labor gain from Liberal | | Swing | +6.38 | |

== Aftermath ==
The loss of Aston reduced the Liberal party to holding three out of the 26 federal seats in Melbourne, and six across the whole of Victoria. Labor increased their numbers to holding 25 seats across Victoria.

Figures within and associated with the Coalition gave several reasons for the Liberal Party's unexpected loss. Federal opposition leader Peter Dutton stated he accepted responsibility for the Liberal's loss in Aston, but stated the party's fundamental principles would not change. David Littleproud, leader of the National Party of Australia, stated that "character assassination" of Dutton had hurt the Liberal's campaign. Littleproud also stated the Victorian Liberal Party were doing "everything they could locally there to trash their own brand" by fighting internally on whether to expel Moira Deeming. Victorian Liberal leader John Pesutto disputed this, stating "It was a federal by-election, with local issues in it, and none of the issues surrounding the Victorian parliamentary party were being raised". Former Liberal prime minister Malcolm Turnbull stated that the by-election loss was caused by the federal Liberal party moving too far to the right. Speculation was raised that Dutton would be challenged for the leadership of the party; however, that did not occur. The Victorian Liberal party pre-selected former mayor of the City of Knox Manny Cicchiello to be their candidate at the 2025 Australian federal election. Doyle would retain Aston at the election on 3 May 2025.

Premier of Victoria Daniel Andrews stated that the Liberal party was "a nasty, bigoted outfit and people have worked them out, and that might be why they keep losing". Prime minister Anthony Albanese cited Dutton's strategy of negativity as a reason for the Liberal party's loss.

== See also ==
- List of Australian federal by-elections
- 2001 Aston by-election
