= Sandelson =

Sandelson is a surname. Notable people with the surname include:

- Neville Sandelson (1923–2002), British politician
- Johnny Sandelson (born 1968), British property developer

== See also ==
- Sanderson (surname)
