= James Sanderson =

James Sanderson may refer to:

- James Sanderson (musician) (1769–c. 1841), English violinist and composer
- James Sanderson (naval officer) (1926–2010), U.S. Navy admiral
- Sir James Sanderson, 1st Baronet (1741–1798), British banker and politician
- James Sanderson (rugby union) (1852–1930), Scottish rugby union player
- James Sanderson (military surgeon) (1812–1891), military surgeon in India and amateur meteorologist
- James Sanderson (curler), Scottish curler
- James Alfred Sanderson, Canadian politician
- James Sanderson (footballer) (born 2006), English footballer
