= Sanderson =

Sanderson may refer to:

== Places ==
- Sanderson, Florida, a town in the United States
- Sanderson, Texas, a census-designated place in the United States
- Sanderson, West Virginia, an unincorporated community in the United States
- Sanderson, Northern Territory, an area of Darwin, Australia
- Electoral division of Sanderson, in Australia
- Sanderson Farms, a US-based poultry producer
- Sanderson High School (Texas)
- Sanderson High School, East Kilbride, South Lanarkshire, Scotland
- Sanderson Hotel in London

== People ==
- Sanderson (surname), people with the surname Sanderson
- Sanderson (politician) (born 1969), Brazilian federal deputy

== Other uses ==
- Arthur Sanderson & Sons Ltd, a British fabric and wallpaper manufacturer
- Angus-Sanderson, an English automobile manufacturer (1919–1927)

== See also ==
- Jesse O. Sanderson High School, Raleigh, North Carolina US
- Sanders (disambiguation)
- Sander (disambiguation)
