= Saunderson =

Saunderson is a surname. It may refer to:

- Alexander Saunderson (1783–1857), Irish Whig politician, Francis's son.
- Ann Saunderson (born 1967), British dance/soul artist
- Bill Saunderson (born c. 1934), Canadian politician
- Edward James Saunderson (1837–1906), Anglo-Irish politician and landowner, Alexander's son.
- Francis Saunderson (1754–1827), Anglo-Irish politician
- Frances Lumley-Saunderson, Countess of Scarbrough (died 1772), British courtier
- George Lumley-Saunderson, 5th Earl of Scarbrough (1753–1807), British peer
- George Saunderson, 5th Viscount Castleton (1631–1714), English politician
- George Saunderson, American politician
- James Saunderson, 1st Earl Castleton (c. 1667–1723), English aristocrat and politician
- Jason M. Saunderson (1886–1950), US football, basketball, and baseball coach
- John Saunderson (born 1948), British-born Australian politician
- Kevin Saunderson (born 1964), US electronic music producer, originator of techno music
- Mary Saunderson (1637–1712), British actress and opera singer
- Nicholas Saunderson (1682–1739), English scientist and mathematician who was blind
- Richard Lumley-Saunderson (disambiguation) (two people)
- Thomas Lumley-Saunderson, 3rd Earl of Scarbrough (c. 1691–1752), British peer, army officer, and diplomat
