= Aquarius Festival =

Australian music and cultural festival

Coordinates: 28°38′45″S 153°13′23″E

Nimbin Aquarius Festival
- Dates: 12 to 23 May 1973
- Locations: Canberra, Nimbin, New South Wales, Australia
- Years active: 1971, 1973
- Founders: Johnny Allen and Graeme Dunstan

The Nimbin Aquarius Festival was a counter-cultural arts and music festival organised by the Australian Union of Students. It was the fourth in a biennial series of festivals, first organised by the National Union of Australian University Students. The first Australian Universities Arts Festival was held in Sydney in 1967, and the second Australian Universities Arts Festival was held in Melbourne in 1969. The third added "Aquarius" to its name and was held in Canberra in 1971. The fourth and last was held in Nimbin, New South Wales in 1973.

The Aquarius Festival aimed to celebrate alternative thinking and sustainable lifestyles. The ten-day event was held from 12 to 23 May 1973 and co-directed by Johnny Allen and Graeme Dunstan. Vernon Treweeke also played a part in organising the event. It is often described as Australia's equivalent to the Woodstock Festival and the birthplace for Australia's hippie movement. It has also been credited with being the first event that sought the permission to use the land from traditional owners, and included a Welcome to Country ceremony. The estimated attendance at Nimbin was between 5,000 and 10,000 people.

== Performers ==
Performers at the festival included the White Company - an experimental theatre troupe featuring a number of alternative culture artists including Peter Carolan - singer Paul Joseph, Donny McCormack (ex-Nutwood Rug Band), The Larrikins and Ian Farr. Also appearing were Indian street performers the Bauls of Bengal, the South African pianist Dollar Brand (later known as Abdullah Ibrahim), classical-ambient musician Lindsay Bourke, and tightrope walker and unicyclist Philippe Petit, who gained worldwide fame the following year by walking between the rooftops of the Twin Towers at the World Trade Center. The New Zealand-based musical and theatrical troupe Blerta also made an appearance, starring the likes of Bruno Lawrence and Geoff Murphy, both of whom later went on to produce a number of successful feature films together.

== Legacy ==
The festival had a permanent effect on the economy of Nimbin, as many Festival participants decided to remain in the district. The area was previously a dairying and banana growing region in severe decline. Some of those that stayed might be defined as hippies, but in fact the larger percentage came from all sorts of backgrounds and life experience, ranging from 18 to 80 years old.

One group pooled resources after the Nimbin Aquarius Festival and bought a then 500-hectare (1,200-acre) property at Tuntable Falls in the next valley east, below Mount Nardi, and formed a community called the "Co-Ordination Co-Operative". Other groups followed suit and formed communes that continue today. Examples include Paradise Valley Pastoral Company and Nmbngee.

Interviews were conducted in 1992 documenting the alternative lifestyle movement of northern NSW in the 1970s, focusing on the town of Nimbin and the 1973 Aquarius Festival. Interviewees discussed how they arrived in Nimbin, their efforts in organising the Aquarius Festival, and the lasting impact the Festival had on the township.

Aquarius is a 2024 documentary directed by Wendy Champagne, chronicling the Nimbin Aquarius Festival of 1973.

== See also ==
- List of Australian music festivals
- List of historic rock festivals
- List of jam band music festivals
