= William Sanderson (disambiguation) =

William Sanderson (born 1944) is an American actor.

William Sanderson may also refer to:

- William Sanderson (historian) (c1586–1676), English historian
- William Sanderson (footballer) (1885–1911), English footballer
- William Siegel (1905–1990), born Wilhelm Tsiegelnitsky, sometimes known as William Sanderson), American painter and illustrator
