= Tilly Aston =

Australian writer and teacher

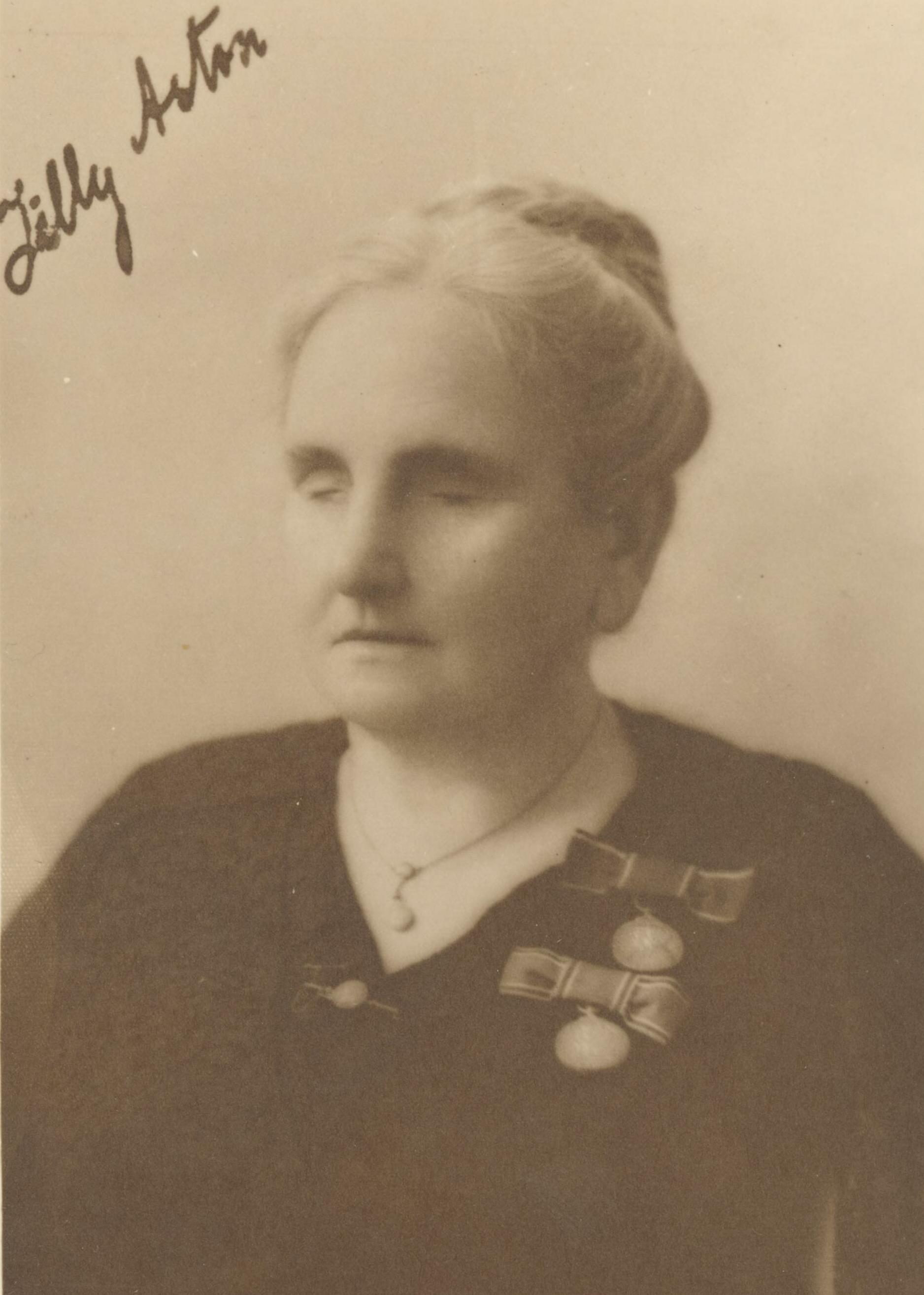
- Born: Matilda Ann Aston; 11 December 1873; Carisbrook, Victoria, Australia
- Died: 1 November 1947 (aged 73); Windsor, Victoria, Australia
- Resting place: St Kilda Cemetery
- Occupations: Educator; writer
- Known for: Promoting rights of vision impaired people

Matilda Ann Aston (11 December 1873 – 1 November 1947), better known as Tilly Aston, was a blind Australian writer and teacher, who founded the Victorian Association of Braille Writers, and later went on to establish the Association for the Advancement of the Blind, with herself as secretary. She is remembered for her achievements in promoting the rights of vision-impaired people.

== Life ==
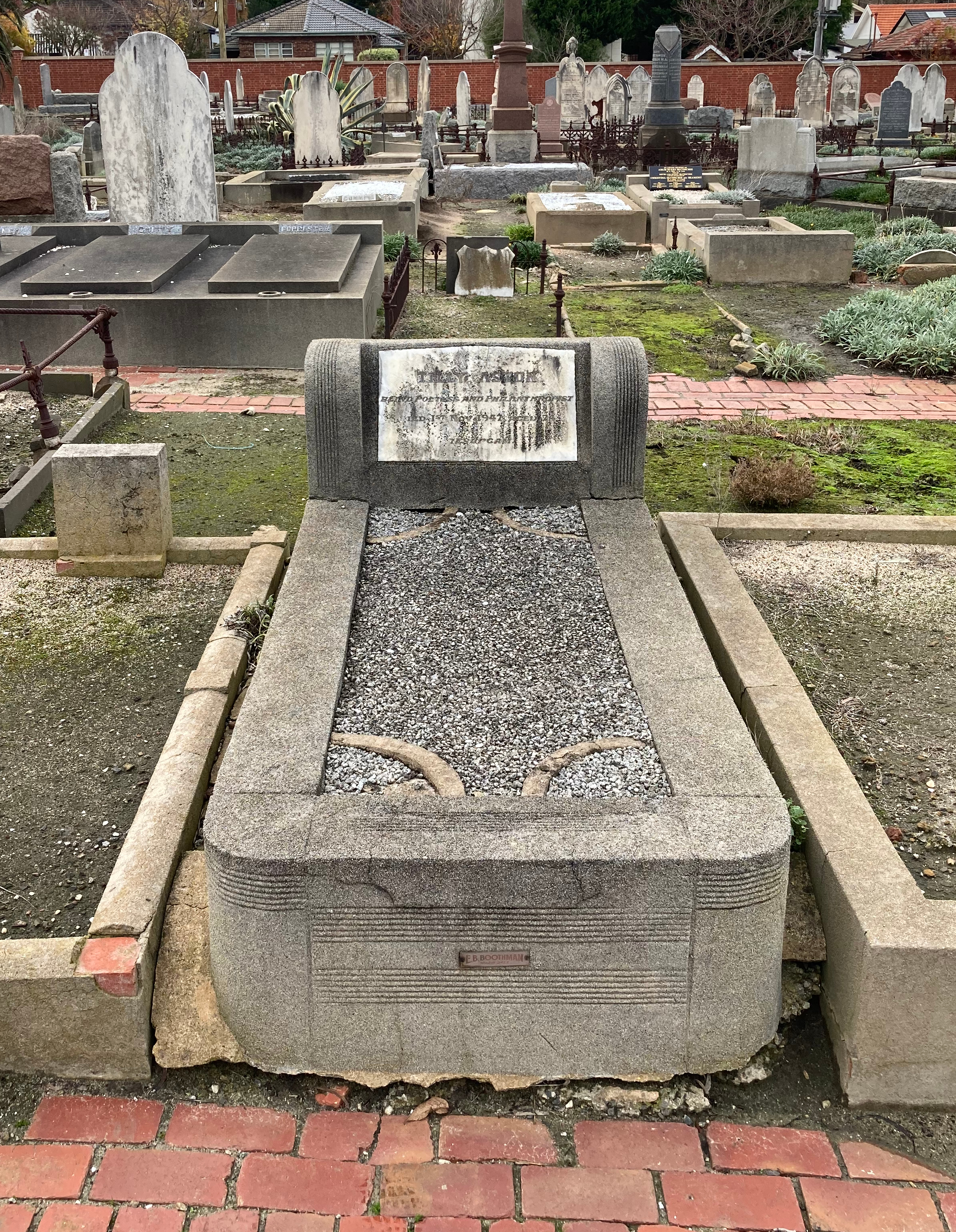
Aston's grave at St Kilda Cemetery

Tilly was born in the town of Carisbrook, Victoria in 1873, the youngest of eight children born to Edward Aston, a bootmaker, and his wife, Ann. Vision-impaired from birth, she was totally blind by the age of 7. Her father died in 1881. Six months later, through a chance meeting, she met Thomas James, a miner who had lost his sight in an industrial accident and who had become an itinerant blind missionary. He taught her to read braille and, soon after, the Rev. W. Moss, who visited Carisbrook with the choir of the Victorian Asylum and School for the Blind, persuaded her to attend the school in St Kilda, Melbourne, to further her education. She enrolled as a boarder on 29 June 1882. After successfully matriculating at the age of 16, Tilly became the first blind Australian to go to a university, enrolling for an arts degree from University of Melbourne. However, due to the lack of braille text books and "nervous prostration", she was forced to discontinue her studies in the middle of her second year. While convalescent, she tried to earn her living as a music teacher, and realised the plight of blind people.

After leaving school, she lived with her mother and a brother in Melbourne until about 1913, when her mother died and her brother married. She then moved to a house of her own in Windsor, where she had a house-keeper-companion. She died there of cancer on 1 November 1947, and was buried at St Kilda Cemetery.

The Federal electorate Division of Aston in Melbourne's eastern suburbs and a street in the Canberra suburb Cook are named in her honour. A cairn was erected in her honour, a year after her death, by Carisbrook Primary School and the Midlands Historical Society, and there is a sculpture in her honour in Kings Domain, Melbourne.

== Career ==
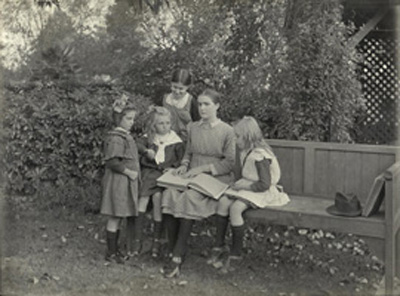
Aston as a young woman teaching Braille to children

With the assistance of friends and the Australian Natives' Association, Aston established the Victorian Association of Braille Writers in 1894. This organisation would eventually become the Victorian Braille Library. In 1895 a meeting called by Tilly Aston founded the Association for the Advancement of the Blind (now Vision Australia) to fight for greater independence, social change and new laws for blind people. They quickly won voting rights for blind people; free postage for Braille material in 1899 (a world first for Australia); and transport concessions for the blind.

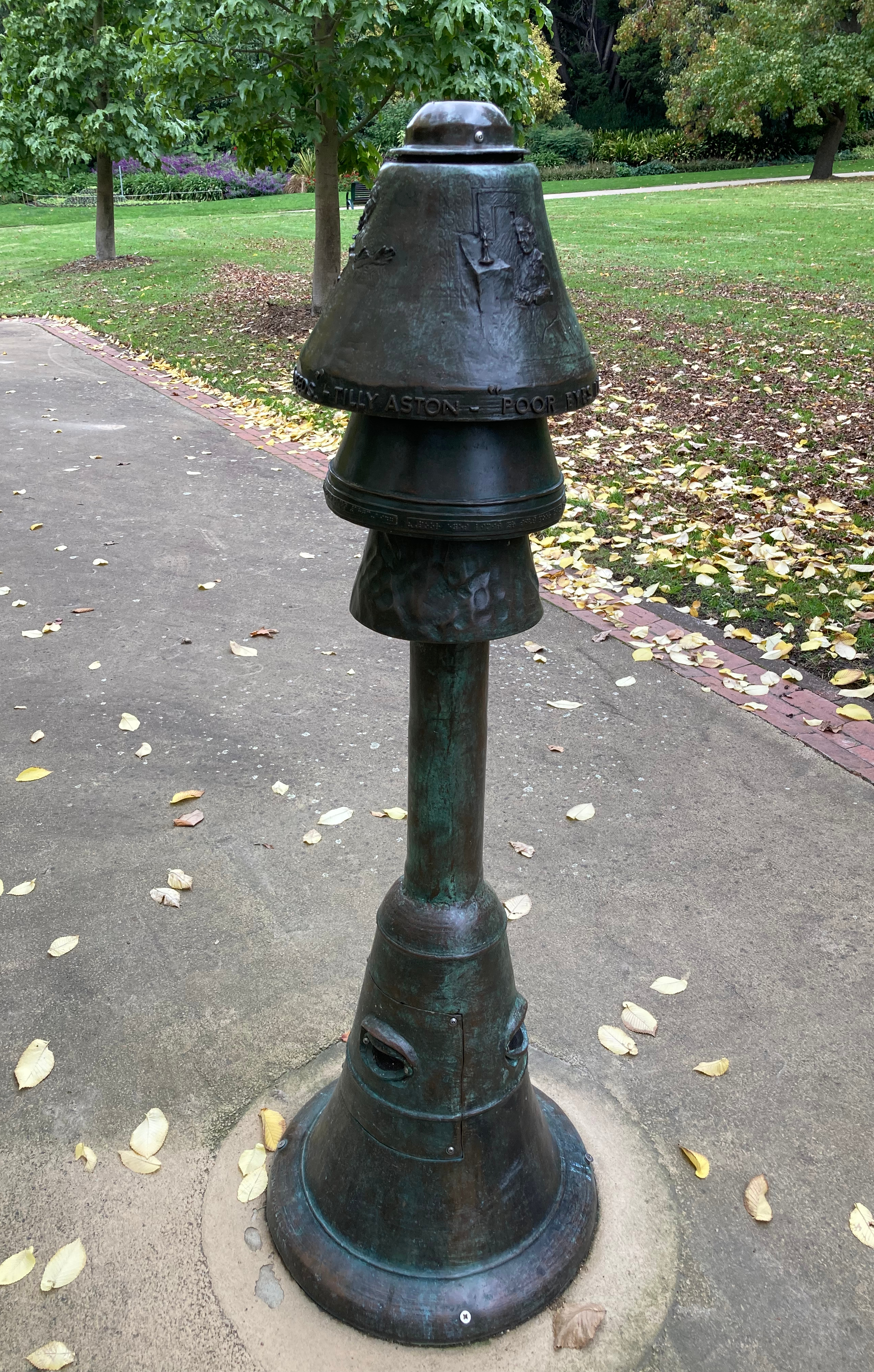
Tilly Aston Bell, a sculpture by Anton Hasell at Kings Domain, Melbourne

In 1913 Tilly Aston did teaching training and become head of the Victorian Education Department's School for the Blind, the first blind woman to do so. Her appointment was not without criticism from staff and officials of the Royal Victorian Institute for the Blind because of her disability and she was required to "sever her connexion with the blind societies she had helped to found". She proved a competent educator and administrator, but her school years were not happy ones. She retired in 1925, following a minor stroke, and received a small allowance in lieu of superannuation.

== Writing career ==
Aston was also a prolific writer, particularly of poetry and prose sketches, though her writing was often interrupted by her teaching and other activities. In 1904, she won the Prahran City Council's competition for an original story. The Woolinappers, or Some Tales from the By-ways of Methodism was published in 1905, and several books followed after that. Her writings were also serialised in Victorian newspapers and, for 12 years, she edited and contributed to a braille magazine for Chinese mission schools, A Book of Opals.

She had 8 volumes of verse published in Melbourne between 1901 and 1940, corresponded around the world using the Esperanto language, and wrote her memoirs which were published in 1946. She believed her book of verse, The Inner Garden, contained her best work.

== Awards ==
- 1935: Commonwealth grant
- King's Medal for distinguished citizen service (received twice)
- Victorian Honour Roll of Women (2001)

== Works ==
Poetry

- Maiden Verses (1901)
- The Austral Year (191-?)
- Singable Songs (1924)
- Songs of Light (1935)
- The Inner Garden (1940)

Fiction

- The Woolinappers, or Some Tales from the By-ways of Methodism (1905)
- The Straight Goer (in Spectator, serialised from Sept 1908)
- Gold from Old Diggings (in Bendigo Advertiser, serialised from Aug 1937)
- Old Timers: Sketches and Word Pictures of the Old Pioneers (1938)

Non-fiction

- The Memoirs of Tilly Aston: Australia's Blind Poet, Author and Philanthropist (1935)

== Bibliography ==
- Adelaide, Debra (1988) Australian Women Writers: A Bibliographic Guide, London, Pandora
- Aston, Matilda Ann at The Australian Women's Register
- Green, O. S. (1997). "Aston, Matilda Ann (1873–1947)". Australian Dictionary of Biography. Vol. 7. National Centre of Biography, Australian National University. ISBN 978-0-522-84459-7. ISSN 1833-7538. OCLC 70677943.
- Stories of Vision
- Vision Australia (2007) Biography of Tilly Aston: Founder of Vision Australia Library
