= Alan Jarman =

Australian politician (1923–1992)

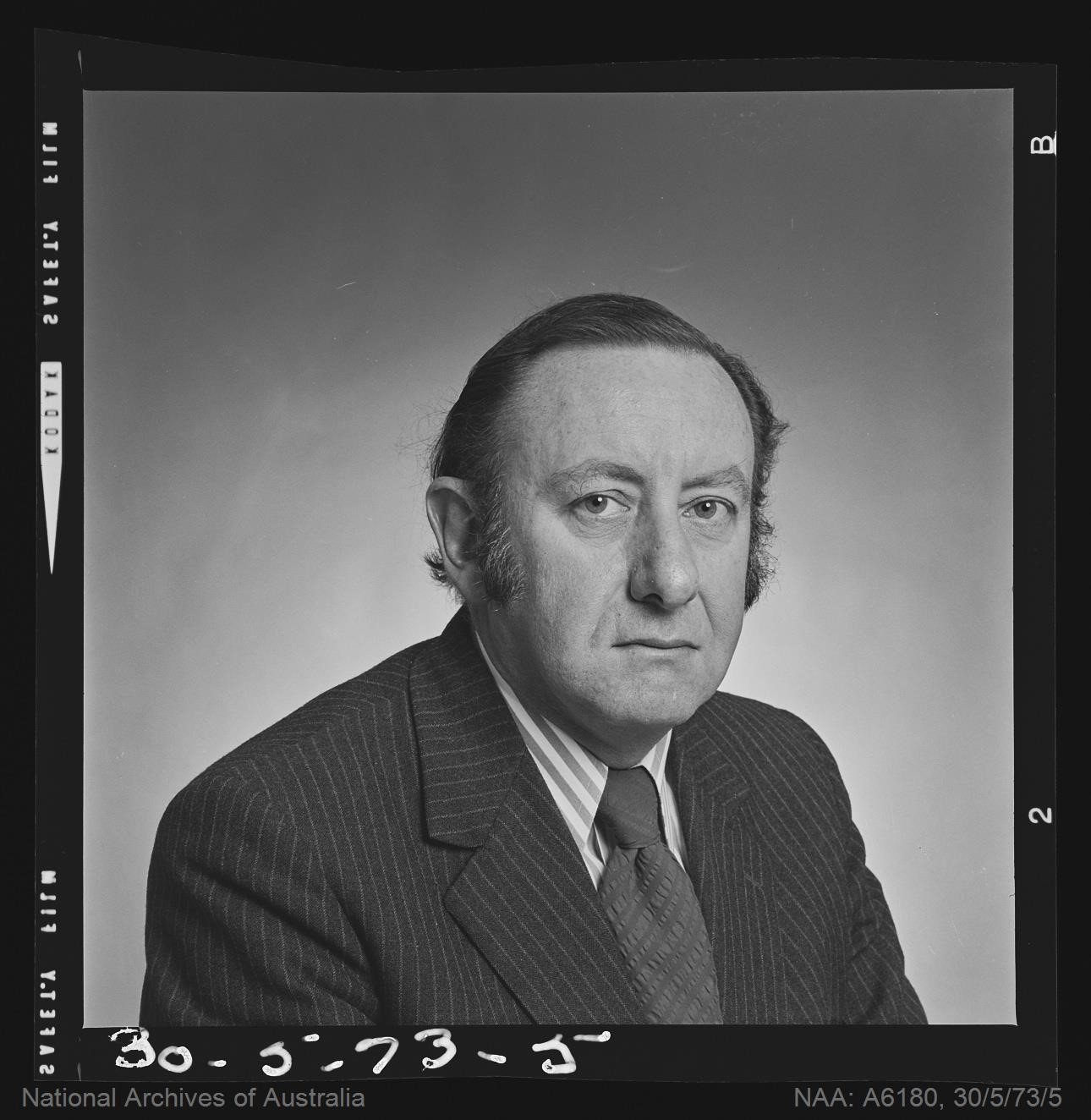

Member of the Australian Parliament for Deakin
- In office 26 November 1966 – 5 March 1983
- Preceded by: Frank Davis
- Succeeded by: John Saunderson

Personal details
- Born: 22 July 1923 Melbourne, Victoria
- Died: 14 November 1992 (aged 69)
- Party: Liberal Party of Australia
- Education: University of Melbourne
- Occupation: Accountant

Alan William Jarman (22 July 1923 – 14 November 1992) was an Australian politician. Born in Melbourne, he attended Wesley College and then the University of Melbourne before becoming an accountant. He served in the military 1942–46. In 1966, he was elected to the Australian House of Representatives as the Liberal member for Deakin. He held the seat until 1983, when he was defeated by John Saunderson of the Labor Party. Jarman died in 1992.

Parliament of Australia
Preceded by Frank Davis	Member for Deakin; 1966–1983	Succeeded by John Saunderson
