= Cashless Welfare Card =

Australian Government issued debit card for welfare recipients

The Cashless Welfare Card, also known as the Indue Card, Healthy Welfare Card or Cashless Debit Card, is an Australian debit card, trialled by the Australian Government from 2016 onwards, which quarantines income for people on certain income support payments to "encourage socially responsible behaviour" by not allowing the owner to purchase alcohol, gamble or withdraw cash. The cards are attached to a separate account managed by Indue into which 80% of the income support payment is paid. In addition, the cashless welfare card only allows users of the card to buy products at approved sellers, that support electronic Mastercard or Visa payments. It cannot stop users from buying restricted goods at shops that sell both restricted and approved goods, such as supermarkets that sell alcohol. Bill payments are set up by Centrelink to automatically be paid by the card. An earlier income management card, the BasicsCard, was trialed in the Northern Territory.

The Labor Party promised to end the Cashless Debit Card and make the Basics Card voluntary if it won the 2022 election. In the lead up to the election, Labor claimed that the Coalition government planned to expand the card's use to aged pensioners. As of June 2022, briefings had begun to wind down the Cashless Welfare Card, although the Albanese government has promised to consult with the trial communities, and CDC users in the Northern Territory will transition onto the BasicsCard income management scheme.

== Review ==
In 2013, Andrew Forrest was chosen by Tony Abbott, to lead a review into Indigenous employment and training programs, which was to report to the Australian government. Alan Tudge was to work with Forrest on the review, and Marcia Langton was also on the review committee. The review was delivered on 1 August 2014, with 27 recommendations. Forrest recommended that the Healthy Welfare Card be mandatory for unemployed people, carers, people with disabilities and single parents. According to Langton, the review recommended that the card only be used in areas where most households were receiving welfare, with the goal of ending intergenerational poverty. The Forrest Review did not review the impact of the BasicsCard or other income management schemes when recommending the Healthy Welfare Card. While Forrest initially envisaged a fully cashless card, Tudge altered it to be mostly cashless. Marcia Langton has since withdrawn her support for the scheme citing it as "brutal" and abuse of the poor.

== Inquiry ==
Senate inquiries were conducted into the card in 2015, 2017, and 2018. two in 2019 and one in 2020.

An independent review of the implementation and performance of the Cashless Welfare Card trial was performed by the Australian National Audit Office which resulted in a number of flaws in the trial being identified, and a series of recommendations made including that a cost-benefit analysis be conducted, and that the Department of Social Service should fully utilise all available data to measure performance, instead of the limited data set used in the evaluation commissioned by the department. It was widely reported that there were fundamental flaws in the Cashless Welfare Card evaluation and justification for continued operation, but the Minister for Social Services, Dan Tehan indicated that the trials would continue, stating that "The cashless debit card is making a real difference in the communities where it operates".

This response is in stark contrast with one of the four community leaders who supported the Cashless Welfare Card being trialled in his area withdrawing support due to feeling "used" to drum up support and the failure to provide adequate support services as was promised. Commentary stating that the Cashless Welfare Card is a success also neglects to mention an actual increase in crime when year to year averages are considered. There is also very little mention of negative outcomes such as an increase in suicides which has been directly linked to the implementation of the Cashless Welfare Card trial, which was raised in the 2017 inquiry. A Parliamentary Joint Committee on Human Rights report from 2017 has found that the CDC negatively impacts rights to social security, privacy, family, equality and non-discrimination, furthermore finding that there has been no compelling rationale for the scale of the CDC.

A 2018 review of the trial programme by the Australian National Audit Office found that the trial results and outcomes were inadequately monitored, and therefore it was difficult to evaluate whether the trial had been successful in reducing social harms and delivering a cheaper welfare quarantining system. Despite this, trials were extended on multiple occasions.

== Trials ==
Existing trial sites (red) and proposed (yellow)

The trials began in March 2016. The Greens senator for Western Australia, Rachel Siewert attempted to halt the trials. The card has faced criticism for targeting Indigenous people, and for its compulsory use by recipients of social security payments, even when they do not engage in behaviours like using illegal drugs. In August 2017, a delegation of community and Indigenous leaders showed Malcolm Turnbull video footage of their town, describing them as "war zones", asking for the card to be implemented in their towns. In December 2017, Labor and the Greens announced that they would not support further trials in the Goldfields or Bundaberg. This was a major shift for Labor, which had supported all previous income management processes. The third trial location had not been decided as of December 2017. The legislation to decide on the third trial site would also make it possible for the government to roll the card out more widely without parliamentary approval. This legislation was not passed through the senate, following opposition by Nick Xenophon Team senators. A drug testing regime for young people receiving Centrelink payments may also use the cashless welfare card as a consequence of testing positive. 5,000 people are expected to be involved in the drug testing trial in Mandurah, Western Australia, Logan, Queensland, and Canterbury-Bankstown, New South Wales. In 2020, a brief pause was put on adding new participants to the Cashless Debit Card due to the COVID-19 pandemic. In 2020, a bill was put before the Senate to make the cards permanent. The trial was extended until 2022. As of February 2022, there were 16,685 CDC participants across the five sites of the trial. Eventually, the Senate opposed making the trials permanent.

=== Ceduna, South Australia ===
When the trial began, Ceduna elder Sue Haseldine stated that community consultation had been limited to service providers, rather than including people who would be put on the card. Mimi Smart, a Yalata elder, argued that the consultations had indicated that the CDC would be targeted at "people that hang out in Ceduna drinking and causing trouble". The community panels that cardholders can apply to get more of their payments as cash are anonymous. As of February 2018, the trial in Ceduna has been extended for another year. 75% of people in the Ceduna trial are Indigenous.

=== Kununurra and Wyndham, Western Australia ===
Trials in Kununurra and Wyndham began in April 2016. Around 1,200 people are part of the trial in Kununurra and Wyndham. WA Police have released statistics saying that violence and intimidating behaviour has increased in the area since the card's introduction. Some people have changed their address with Centrelink so that they fall outside the cashless welfare card trial area in an attempt to avoid being placed onto the card. As of February 2018, the trial in the Kimberlies has been extended for another year. 82% of the people in the East Kimberleys trial are Indigenous.

=== Kalgoorlie, Western Australia ===
The then-prime minister Malcolm Turnbull announced that the Goldfields, including Kalgoorlie, would be a trial site for the cashless card in September 2017. This trial site would include 3,800 participants. In a statement to the senate inquiry on the suitability of Kalgoorlie, the government commented on the site's potential to test the card's scalability to wider use within the population. Participants in Kalgoorlie report that they cannot make bank loan repayments as they are not allowed to be paid for using the quarantined money. The trial in Kalgoorlie has been expanded. 48% of the people in the trial in the Goldfields are Indigenous.

=== Hinkler, Queensland ===
The Division of Hinkler has been announced as the next region to roll out the card in 2018, with approximately 6,700 people expected to be placed on the card. This would make it the first urban area to roll out the card, and the first trial area to not consist of mainly Indigenous people, as 18% of trial participants in Hinkler are Indigenous. The Queensland trial has been passed by the vote of Tim Storer, who has modified the trial there to ensure that an independent inquiry consults with trial participants.

=== Northern Territory and Cape York ===
Following the rape of an Aboriginal toddler in February 2018, it was proposed to trial the cashless welfare card in Tennant Creek with the indigenous community. As part of the 2019-20 Federal Budget, the Government announced a further extension and expansion of the Cashless Welfare Card to 30 June 2021. This includes the transition of approximately 22,500 Income Management participants in the Northern Territory and Cape York to the Cashless Welfare Card from April 2020.

== Exiting cashless welfare arrangements ==
On 5 April 2019, legislation was passed which allowed for an individual who had been placed on the Cashless Welfare Card to apply to exit the trial after 1 July 2019. On 12 August 2019, the assessment criteria were broadened to also consider personal circumstances, in addition to financial management. On 12 September, an application form and information sheet were made available. In addition to these, it was also stated that an assessment will be undertaken and that there will be a phone interview. It is unclear to date how many people were successfully exited from the trial either before or after the changes introduced on 12 September 2019. There has been mention of "about 700 people have come off the card", but this appears to be "because they found work or they were suspended from welfare payments for breaching the rules", rather than due to exiting the trial. Participants in the trial have waited for a year to find out if their application to withdraw from the CDC trial has been approved. As of June 2020, only a fifth of applications to withdraw from the trial have been approved. A report from the ANAO said that as of February 2022, 591 participants have exited the CDC trial.

== Opposition ==
Those who oppose the card commonly call it the "white card", as it has been imposed by white people, to the point where Indue, the company that administers the card, refuses to give service to people who call it the "white card". A number of groups have expressed their opposition to the Cashless Welfare Card trials, including the St Vincent De Paul Society (Vinnies) and the Australian Council of Social Service (ACOSS). The ACOSS has particularly expressed its opposition to the extension of the trials, and has called for the card to be voluntary. There are also numerous grassroots groups which oppose and criticise the Cashless Welfare Card, including (but not limited to) No Cashless Card Australia and Say No Seven, as well as at least fourteen related groups representing each of the regions the program is being trialled or being proposed. These online groups collate all the various perceived or actual failings of the Cashless Welfare Card, ranging from the perception of it being a breach of a person's right to financial autonomy, to instances where the CDC has failed at an EFTPOS terminal, yet other cards have worked.

In September 2019 the media reported a 10% reduction in youth unemployment within the Bundaberg and Hervey Bay areas since the Cashless Welfare Card was introduced which is double the national reduction level of 5% but this was shown later to be a Wide Bay regional figure misrepresented in media by LNP federal member Keith Pitt and not specific to Hinkler electorate. It was highlighted by MP Llew O'Brien, the representative for the neighbouring Wide Bay electorate that similar reductions in welfare dependency had been recorded in his electorate in the same period, though again, no data has been found to support this statement in the national employment record.

== End of the card ==
Legislation to end the Cashless Debit Card was passed by the House of Representatives, and was considered by the Senate in September 2022. As many card users linked theirs to "buy now, pay later" services, it may be difficult to transition away from the cards. Following legislation passing in the Senate, certain users of the Cashless Debit Card were allowed to leave the program before it ended on 6 March 2023. Cashless Debit Card users in the Northern Territory were to be transitioned back onto the BasicsCard, a Howard-era income management scheme, but a new "smart card" has been set up from 6 March 2023 for people who had compulsory income management in the Northern Territory or Cape York. This card has been criticised for its lack of a sunset clause.

A review of the end of the card in 2024 found that since the card had been abolished, stigmatisation had decreased, and a minority of CDC stakeholders were concerned about increased "poor decision making" and financial coercion.

== See also ==
- Abbott government
- Closing the Gap
- EFTPOS
- Northern Territory National Emergency Response
- Turnbull government
- Morrison government
