= Sandison =

Sandison is a Scottish surname. Notable people with the surname include:

- Gordon Sandison (politician) (1919–1989), American politician
- Gordon Sandison (baritone) (1949–2018), Scottish operatic baritone
- Jimmy Sandison (born 1965), Scottish footballer
- Johnny Sandison (1926–2004), Canadian broadcaster
- Marcus (born 1971) and Michael (born 1970) Sandison, Scottish electronic music duo of Boards of Canada
- Ronald A. Sandison (1916–2010), Scottish psychotherapist
- Scott Sandison (born 1979), Canadian field hockey player
