= Mary Doyle =

Australian politician

Mary Doyle MP
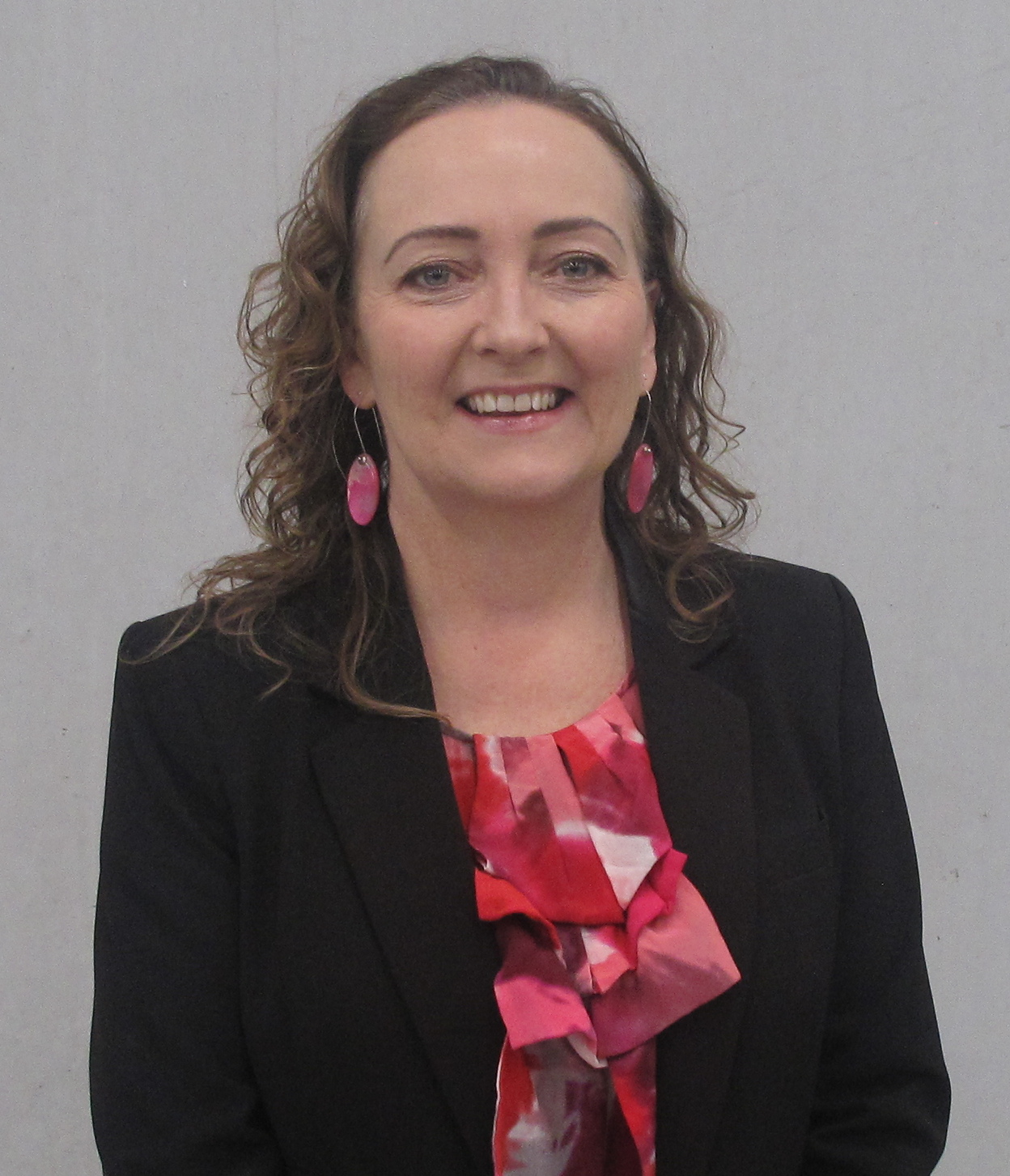
- Doyle in 2025

Member of the Australian Parliament for Aston
- Incumbent
- Assumed office 1 April 2023
- Preceded by: Alan Tudge

Personal details
- Born: 26 June 1970 (age 56) Echuca, Victoria, Australia
- Party: Labor
- Children: 2
- Committees: Social Policy and Legal Affairs

Mary Judith Jacinta Doyle (born 26 June 1970) is an Australian politician. She has been a Labor member of the Parliament of Australia representing the Federal Division of Aston since a by-election on 1 April 2023, held to replace former Liberal member Alan Tudge. Doyle is the first woman to hold the seat of Aston since its creation in 1984, and the first Labor MP for the seat since 1990.

== Early life ==
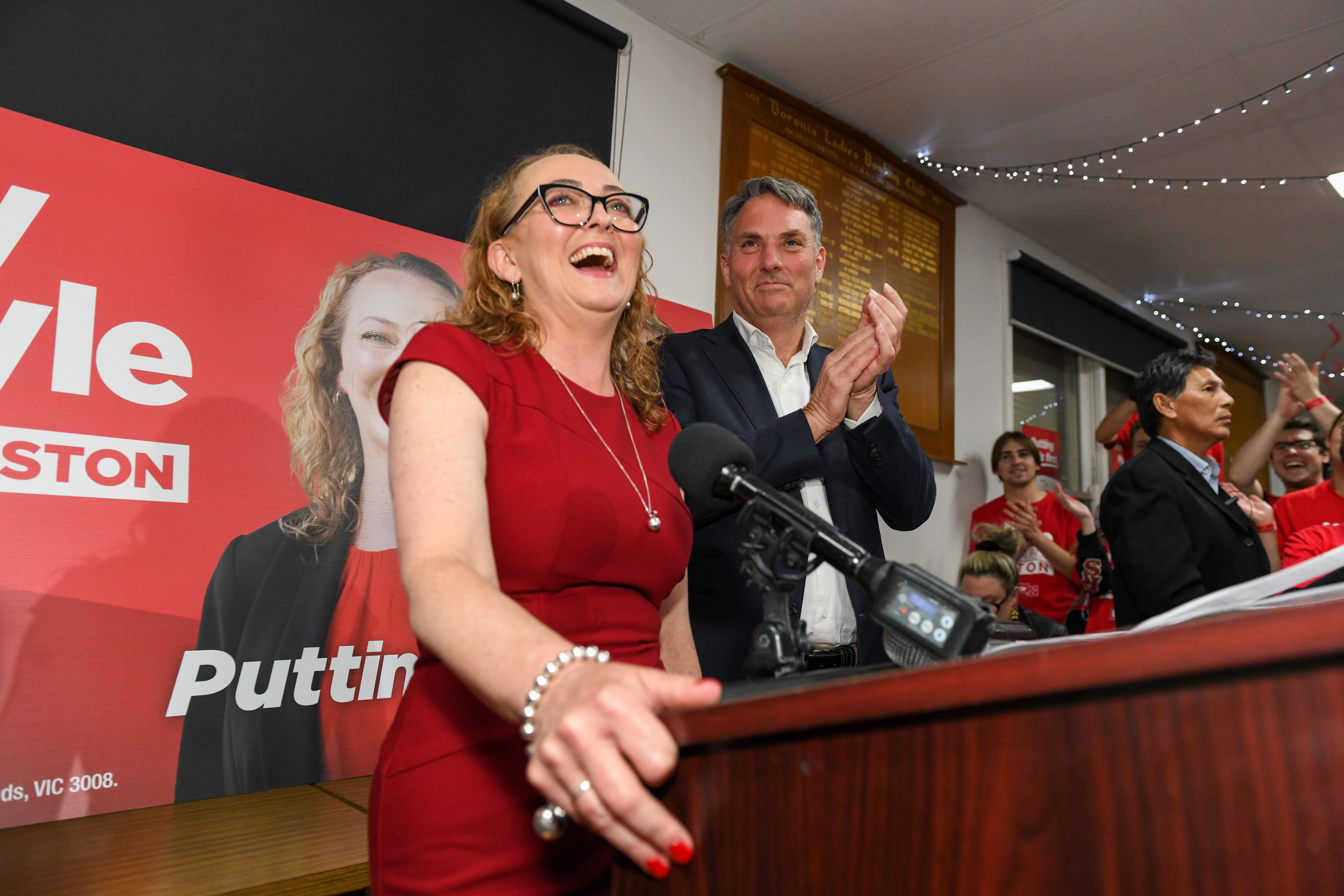
Mary Doyle MP takes to the podium with Deputy PM Richard Marles as she claims victory in front of supporters after winning the seat of Aston for ALP with 54% of the vote in Melbourne, Australia.

Doyle is the youngest of nine children. She was born and raised in Echuca, where her family lived in public housing. Doyle attended secondary school at Bendigo Senior Secondary College. At the age of 17, Doyle moved to suburban Melbourne.

Doyle attended TAFE to study Performing Arts. She is a singer and a performer. In the 1990s she was active in the local Melbourne music scene as a singer. She was a vocalist in Australian indie bands The Late Mail and The Beautiful Few. She also plays the ukulele.

In 2010, Doyle appeared on the Australian television soap opera Neighbours. She was a contestant on RocKwiz in 2012.

In 1995 when she was 25, Doyle was diagnosed with breast cancer. She made a successful recovery.

== Politics ==
Doyle previously contested the seat in the 2022 federal election. Owing to the timing of the by-election and the accession of King Charles III, Doyle was the first member of the federal parliament to be sworn in under a king since 1951.

The result of the by-election marked the first time since 1920 that a government has won a by-election from the opposition. At the start of the by-election, Doyle lived in the suburb of Mitcham, located in the neighbouring Deakin electorate. She now lives in Wantirna South, within the electorate.

Doyle was re-elected at the 2025 Australian federal election, defeating Liberal candidate Manny Cicchiello. In a Labor caucus meeting in September 2025, Doyle questioned Anthony Albanese on comments he had made regarding the March for Australia. Albanese had stated to caucus that not all attendees were neo-Nazis, and had previously told media that some "good people" had attended. Doyle, according to the recollection of an unnamed Labor MP, used words along the lines of "bad things did happen at the rally, where do we draw the line?"

== Personal life ==
Doyle was married in 1998. She has a son and a daughter. She was divorced in 2016, raising her children as a single mother. She is also guardian to her great-niece.

Doyle is a member of the Australian Services Union and the Media Entertainment and Arts Alliance.

Parliament of Australia
Preceded by Alan Tudge	Member for Aston; 2023–present	Incumbent
