= Edward Sanderson (disambiguation) =

Edward Frederick Sanderson is an American Congregational minister.

Edward Sanderson may also refer to:

- Edward Sanderson, character in Best Friends Together
- Edward Sanderson (chess player), see List of Canadian Chess Championship winners
- Edward Sanderson (mayor), Mayor of Elizabeth, New Jersey
