= James Sanderson (military surgeon) =

Surgeon Major James Sanderson FRSE FRCSE (21 May 1812–28 March 1891) was a 19th-century Scottish military surgeon and amateur meteorologist.

== Life ==
He was born in Dunbar on 21 May 1812. He was educated at Dunbar Grammar School then studied medicine at the University of Edinburgh.

Around 1830 he joined the naval section of the East India Company. He served on the ships "Marquess of Camden" and the "Duke of Argyll" and made journeys to St Helena, Bombay, Calcutta and Ceylon. He also made several journeys to both China and the East Indies. In 1837 he became Assistant Surgeon to the Madras section of the EIC and from there was moved to Ootacamund in the Neilgherry Hills to run a sanitorium there.

In the 1840s and 1850s he held the role of Presidency Surgeon in Madras. He served four successive governors: the Marquess of Tweeddale, Sir Henry Pottinger, Lord Harris and Sir William Denison. During his time in India he organised horticultural Gardens in the Neilgherry Hills, improvements to the jails, and medical dispensaries across southern India. He also served the medical needs of General Sir George Berkeley and General Strachey, Commander-in-Chief of the Madras Army. After a final tour of the provinces with Lord Harris he returned to Britain with him in 1859. He returned to India in 1861 to serve Sir William Denison in his Presidency. He then briefly served his successor, Sir Hope Grant.

He moved to Edinburgh in 1862, living at 17 Claremont Crescent. In Edinburgh he joined the Meteorological Society and helped to run the Medical Mission.

In 1863 he was elected a Fellow of the Royal Society of Edinburgh. His proposer was Robert Allan. He joined the Scottish Meteorological Society in the same year. He also linked to the Ben Nevis Observatory, serving as its Honorary Treasurer in 1883. Together with his friend Dr Donald Beith he also attended medical night-classes, purely out of academic interest, to keep his knowledge up to date.

He finally retired to 8 Manor Place in Edinburgh's West End.

He died on 28 March 1891 aged 78. He was buried in Dean Cemetery on 1 April 1891.
