= Alan Tudge =

Australian politician (born 1971)

The Honourable Alan Tudge
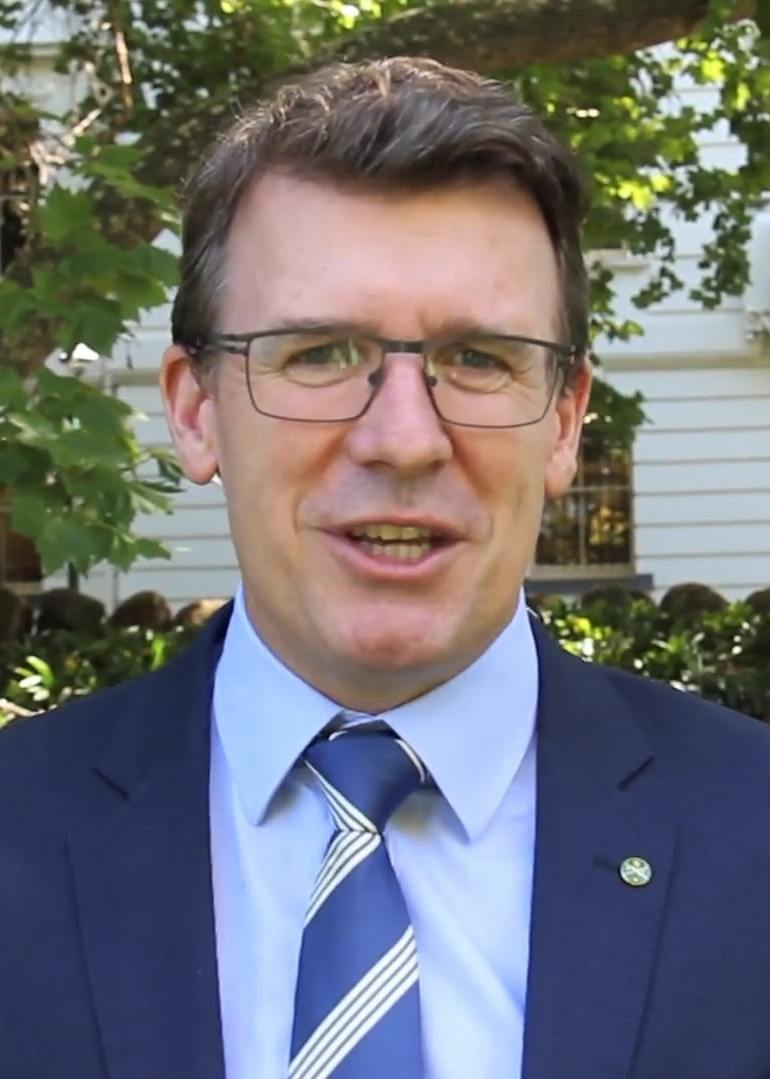
- Tudge in 2018

Minister for Education and Youth
- In office 22 December 2020 – 4 March 2022 (Note: On leave 2 December 2021 – 4 March 2022.)
- Prime Minister: Scott Morrison
- Preceded by: Dan Tehan (as Minister for Education); Richard Colbeck (as Minister for Youth and Sport)
- Succeeded by: Jason Clare (Education); Anne Aly (Youth)

Minister for Population, Cities and Urban Infrastructure
- In office 28 August 2018 – 22 December 2020
- Prime Minister: Scott Morrison
- Preceded by: Paul Fletcher
- Succeeded by: Paul Fletcher (as Minister for Communications, Urban Infrastructure, Cities and the Arts)

Minister for Citizenship and Multicultural Affairs
- In office 20 December 2017 – 28 August 2018
- Prime Minister: Malcolm Turnbull; Scott Morrison
- Preceded by: Office established
- Succeeded by: David Coleman

Minister for Human Services
- In office 18 February 2016 – 20 December 2017
- Prime Minister: Malcolm Turnbull
- Preceded by: Stuart Robert
- Succeeded by: Michael Keenan

Member of the Australian Parliament for Aston
- In office 21 August 2010 – 17 February 2023
- Preceded by: Chris Pearce
- Succeeded by: Mary Doyle

Personal details
- Born: 24 February 1971 (age 55) Pakenham, Victoria, Australia
- Party: Liberal
- Spouse: Teri Etchells (separated 2017)
- Children: 3
- Education: University of Melbourne; Harvard Business School
- Profession: Management consultant

Alan Tudge (born 24 February 1971) is an Australian former politician. He was a Liberal Party member of the House of Representatives between 2010 and 2023. He was a cabinet minister in the Morrison government from 2019 to 2022.

Tudge grew up in Pakenham, Victoria. Before entering politics he was a management consultant with the Boston Consulting Group and deputy director of the Cape York Institute (2006–2009). He was elected to federal parliament in 2010, representing the Victorian seat of Aston. Tudge became a parliamentary secretary after the 2013 election. He was a government minister from 2016 to 2022 under Malcolm Turnbull and Scott Morrison, serving as Minister for Human Services (2016–2017), Citizenship and Multicultural Affairs (2017–2018), Population, Cities and Urban Infrastructure (2018–2020), and Education and Youth (2020–2022). During his time as Minister for Human Services, he oversaw the implementation of the unlawful Robodebt debt recovery scheme. He took leave from the ministry in 2021 following allegations of bullying from a former staffer with whom he had an extramarital affair. After the Coalition's defeat at the 2022 election, he was appointed to Peter Dutton's shadow cabinet. Tudge resigned from parliament on 17 February 2023.

== Early life ==
Tudge was born on 24 February 1971 in Pakenham, Victoria. His parents were veterinarians who met at the University of Edinburgh in Scotland and arrived in Australia as Ten Pound Poms. He was born a British citizen by descent, but renounced his dual citizenship before standing for parliament in 2010. His mother was born in Scotland and his father in England, while his maternal grandfather was born in Canada.

Tudge's parents separated when he was around six years old, after which he was raised by his mother on a small farm near Pakenham. He attended a local primary school, then completed his secondary education at Haileybury, Melbourne, graduating in 1988. Tudge attended the University of Melbourne, completing the degrees of Bachelor of Arts and Bachelor of Laws (Hons.). He served as president of the Melbourne University Student Union, replacing Andrew Landeryou, in what he described as "the first time a non-Left president had won for many, many years".

Tudge was one of seven Liberal MPs in the 46th Parliament of Australia who have obtained degrees at an Oxbridge or Ivy League university, the others being Josh Frydenberg, Angus Taylor, Andrew Laming, Dave Sharma, Greg Hunt and Paul Fletcher. Tudge obtained an MBA from Harvard University.

== Career ==
Tudge worked as a management consultant with the Boston Consulting Group (BCG) from 1996 to 2001. He was initially based in Melbourne and later in New York, and during this time completed a Master of Business Administration (MBA) at Harvard University. He was also seconded to indigenous leader Noel Pearson's Cape York Institute through Jawun, as the organisation's first corporate secondee.

In 2002, Tudge became a senior adviser to federal education minister Brendan Nelson. He later worked for foreign minister Alexander Downer. Tudge later rejoined the Cape York Institute as deputy director from 2006 to 2009. He was a founding board member of Teach For Australia, established in 2009 by his former BCG colleague Melodie Potts Rosevear. He subsequently ran his own policy advisory firm from 2009 until his election to parliament.

== Political career ==
Tudge joined the Liberal Party in 2002 and was the convenor of its Education Policy Forum. In September 2009, he won preselection for the Division of Aston as one of 11 candidates, defeating Neil Angus on the final ballot. He retained Aston for the Liberals at the 2010 federal election, succeeding the retiring MP Chris Pearce.

Tudge is a member of the National Right faction of the Liberal Party.

=== Abbott government (2013–2015) ===
Following the 2013 federal election and the formation of the Abbott Ministry, Tudge was appointed as parliamentary secretary to Prime Minister Tony Abbott. On the day of the 2015 leadership spill which saw Abbott replaced by Malcolm Turnbull, he publicly described himself as "a very strong supporter of the prime minister". He was nonetheless retained as assistant minister to Turnbull and also made an assistant minister to social services minister Christian Porter.

=== Turnbull government (2015–2018) ===
In February 2016 Tudge was appointed Minister for Human Services in the Turnbull government. He oversaw the implementation of the Cashless Welfare Card, a scheme by which 80% of welfare payments are placed on a debit card. By 2016, Tudge was seen to be a rising star in the Liberal government.

Following a cabinet reshuffle, Tudge was appointed Minister for Citizenship and Multicultural Affairs in December 2017. During the 2018 Liberal leadership spills, he was one of a number of ministers to tender their resignation to Turnbull; however, his was not immediately accepted. He reportedly voted for Peter Dutton against Scott Morrison in the second vote.

=== Morrison government (2018–2022) ===
Tudge was retained in the First Morrison Ministry as Minister for Cities, Urban Infrastructure and Population. He stated his support for a "Bigger Australia". After the 2019 election he was elevated to cabinet. In December 2019 he was additionally appointed as the acting Minister for Immigration, Citizenship, Migrant Services and Multicultural Affairs, due to David Coleman taking indefinite leave. Tudge was appointed Minister for Education and Youth in December 2020, replacing Dan Tehan as part of a cabinet reshuffle caused by the retirement of Mathias Cormann.

=== In Opposition (2022–2023) ===
In 2022, Prime Minister Scott Morrison and the LNP were voted out at the 2022 Australian federal election. During the election, Tudge had a 7-point two-party preferred swing against him, but still managed to hold the seat by 5 points. The election marked the second time since Tudge was elected that the Liberals sat in opposition. Following the election, Tudge was named in the Shadow Cabinet as the Shadow Minister of Education under the leadership of Peter Dutton but was exiled due to the on-going inquiry into the Robodebt scheme.

Tudge announced his forthcoming resignation in parliament on 9 February 2023, and submitted his resignation on 17 February 2023.

=== Controversies ===
In June 2017, Tudge, and Liberal Party colleagues Greg Hunt and Michael Sukkar, faced the possibility of being prosecuted for contempt of court after they made public statements criticising the sentencing decisions of two senior judges while the government was awaiting their ruling on a related appeal. They avoided prosecution by, eventually, making an unconditional apology to the Victorian Court of Appeal. Conviction could have resulted in their expulsion from the parliament under Constitution s 44(ii) and, as a result, the government losing its one-seat majority in the House of Representatives.

Tudge faced controversy for his role in and defence of the Robodebt scheme. Responding to numerous reports of incorrect debt notices in 2017, Tudge stated "The system is working and we will continue with that system". Robodebt was later ruled to be unlawful and 470,000 debts raised under the scheme were refunded.

In March 2020, the Administrative Appeals Tribunal ordered that an Afghan asylum seeker who had previously been a part of the Afghan National Army be granted a temporary protection visa. Tudge, who was Acting Immigration Minister at the time, instantly appealed the AAT's decision in the Federal Court, which failed. However, during the six-day appeal process, the asylum seeker had been kept in the detention centre. Six months later, the Federal Court found that Tudge had "engaged in conduct which can only be described as criminal" and had deprived the asylum seeker of his liberty, which prompted calls for Tudge's resignation. That decision was itself set aside on appeal, and the matter referred back to a differently constituted sitting of the Administrative Appeals Tribunal.

=== Affair and bullying allegations ===
In November 2020, Tudge's former press secretary Rachelle Miller revealed on a broadcast of Four Corners that they had engaged in an affair. Tudge subsequently released a statement on Facebook confirming the affair and that it led to the end of his marriage. In the same broadcast, Miller described Tudge's opposition to same-sex marriage, based on his support for "traditional" marriage, as hypocritical. She later also accused him of bullying and intimidation, saying in a complaint: "He would often ask me to go to dinner or drinks at the end of a long day on the road. I often felt like I didn’t have much choice or couldn’t say no because he was my boss". After further allegations of abuse by Miller in December 2021, Tudge stood aside from the ministry on 2 December while the claims were investigated. In March 2022, the review cleared Tudge of breaking any rules. Despite the review being in his favour, Tudge decided not to return to the cabinet and said he would resign formally as minister.

== Election results ==
Election results – Alan Tudge
Election	Share of first-preference vote	Share of two-party-preferred vote	Ref.
2010 federal election	46%	51%	
2013 federal election	51%	58%	
2016 federal election	50%	58%	
2019 federal election	55%	60%	
2022 federal election	43.7%	53%	

== Personal life ==
Tudge and his wife, Teri Etchells, had three children. Their 20-year relationship ended in 2017, a year after the birth of their third child, as a result of Tudge's extramarital affair.

Tudge supports the North Melbourne Kangaroos in the Australian Football League.

== In popular culture ==
- Tudge would be played by Guy Edmonds in ABC series Shakedown, based on the 2015-19 Centrelink Robodebt scheme. Tudge at the time was the then Minister of Human Services.

== Explanatory notes ==
Parliament of Australia
Preceded by Chris Pearce	Member for Aston; 2010–2023	Succeeded by Mary Doyle
Political offices
Preceded by Stuart Robert	Minister for Human Services; 2016–2017	Succeeded by Michael Keenan
Vacant Title last held by Kate Lundy as Minister for Multicultural Affairs	Minister for Citizenship and Multicultural Affairs; 2017–2018	Succeeded by David Coleman as Minister for Immigration, Citizenship, Migrant Services and Multicultural Affairs
Preceded by Paul Fletcher	Minister for Population, Cities and Urban Infrastructure; 2018–2020	Succeeded by Paul Fletcher as Minister for Communications, Urban Infrastructure, Cities and the Arts
Preceded by Dan Tehan as Minister for Education	Minister for Education and Youth; 2020–2022	Succeeded by Jason Clare as Minister for Education
Preceded by Richard Colbeck as Minister for Youth and Sport	Minister for Education and Youth; 2020–2022	Succeeded by Anne Aly as Minister for Youth
