= Scott Sanderson =

Scott Sanderson may refer to:

- Scott Sanderson (baseball) (1956–2019), American baseball pitcher
- Scott Sanderson (American football) (born 1974), former American football offensive lineman
- Scott Sanderson (basketball), former head men's basketball coach at Lipscomb University
