= James Sanderson (naval officer) =

United States Navy Vice Admiral

James R. Sanderson
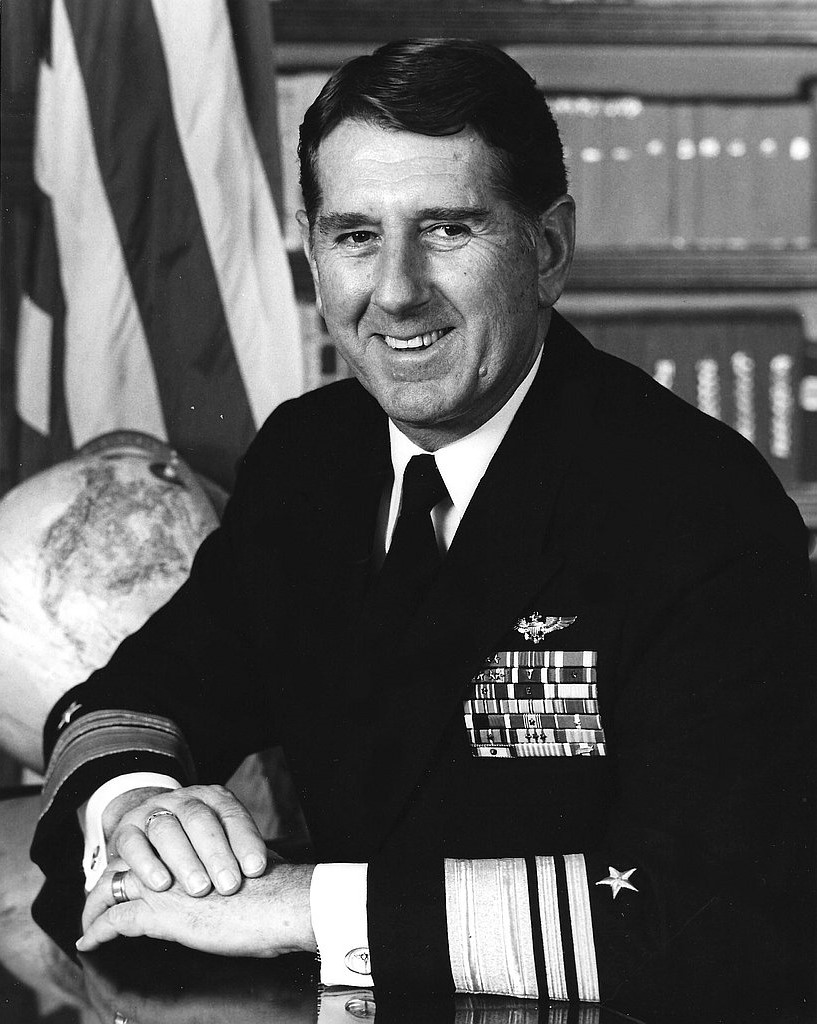
- Born: December 27, 1925; Selma, California
- Died: August 10, 2010 (aged 84); Naval Medical Center Portsmouth, Portsmouth, Virginia
- Military career
- Allegiance: United States
- Branch: United States Navy
- Service years: 1944–1983
- Rank: Vice Admiral
- Nickname: Sandy
- Commands: VA-76; Attack Wing Three; USS Rainier (AE-5); USS Saratoga (CV-60); Battle Force, 6th Fleet
- Conflicts: Korean War; Cold War; Vietnam War
- Awards: Distinguished Service Medal; Legion of Merit (4); Distinguished Flying Cross; Meritorious Service Medal; Air Medal (5)

James Richard "Sandy" Sanderson (December 27, 1925 – August 10, 2010) was a United States Navy vice admiral. He was born in Selma, California, and died in Naval Medical Center Portsmouth, Portsmouth, Virginia; he had lived in Virginia Beach, Virginia, for a long time. His commands included; commanding officer of USS Rainier (AE-5), USS Saratoga (CV-60), and Battle Force, United States Sixth Fleet; and Deputy Commander Atlantic Command, Atlantic Fleet. He entered the Navy Aviation V-5 program in September 1943 (some say March 1944) and retired from the Navy in April 1983.

Sanderson was commissioned as an ensign in July 1945. He then served as a gunnery officer on the destroyers USS Mansfield (DD-728) and USS Bausell (DD-845). In January 1949, Sanderson began flight training in Pensacola, Florida. In May 1950, he was designated a naval aviator after completing advanced flight training in Corpus Christi, Texas.

During the Korean War, Sanderson was deployed with VA-195 in Carrier Air Group 19 aboard USS Princeton (CV-37). In May 1951, he participated in the successful torpedo bomber attack on the flood gates of the Hwacheon Dam. Sanderson flew 101 combat missions during the war.

During the Cuban Missile Crisis, Sanderson was deployed with VA-76 aboard USS Enterprise (CVN-65) in the Caribbean. He served as executive officer from March to November 1962 and as commanding officer from November 1962 to December 1963. Sanderson was then given command of Attack Wing Three aboard USS Saratoga.

From August 1965 to June 1966, Sanderson attended the National War College. While there, he also completed a B.A. degree in international relations at George Washington University.

During the Vietnam War, Sanderson commanded the ammunition ship USS Rainier from January 1969 to March 1970 and the carrier USS Saratoga from August 1971 to February 1973. During the latter command, the embarked Air Wing Three downed two MIGs over the Gulf of Tonkin.

Vice Admiral Sanderson was awarded the Legion of Merit four times, the Distinguished Service Medal, the Distinguished Flying Cross, the Meritorious Service Medal and five Air Medals.

Sanderson was an Eagle Scout and recipient of the Distinguished Eagle Scout Award from the Boy Scouts of America (BSA). He was an active supporter of Scouting throughout his life at many levels, including helping host the annual Eagle Recognition Dinner for BSA's Tidewater Council new Eagle Scouts.

Sanderson married Betty Lee Bradley (April 3, 1926 – July 11, 2018) on September 19, 1947 at the Mare Island naval chapel in Vallejo, California. They are interred in Section 64 of Arlington National Cemetery.

== See also ==
- List of Eagle Scouts (Boy Scouts of America)
