= Robert Sanderson =

Robert Sanderson may refer to:

- Robert Thomas Sanderson (1912–1989), chemist who developed the idea of electronegativity equalization
- Robert Sanderson (Nova Scotia) (1696 – after 1761), merchant and politician of Nova Scotia
- Robert Sanderson (theologian) (1587–1663), English theologian and casuist
- Robert Sanderson (MP), or Saunderson, member of House of Commons of England for West Looe, 1588–1589
- Robert B. Sanderson (1825–1887), American farmer and politician
- Robert Dewayne “Sande” Sanderson, off-duty police officer murdered by anti-abortion bomber Eric Robert Rudolph in the U.S. in 1998
- Robert G. Sanderson (1920–2012), president emeritus of the National Association of the Deaf (U.S.)
