= Division of Aston =

Australian federal electoral division

Coordinates: 37.892°S 145.240°E

Aston Australian House of Representatives Division
- Interactive map of electorate boundaries from the 2025 federal election
- Created: 1984
- MP: Mary Doyle
- Party: Labor
- Namesake: Tilly Aston
- Electors: 122,512 (2025)
- Area: 124 km^{2} (47.9 sq mi)
- Demographic: Outer metropolitan
Electorates around Aston:
Deakin	Deakin	Casey
Chisholm	Aston	Casey
Hotham	Bruce	Bruce

The Division of Aston is an Australian Federal Electoral Division in the state of Victoria, located in the eastern suburbs of Melbourne. The suburbs in the division include Bayswater, Boronia, Ferntree Gully, Kilsyth South, Knoxfield, Rowville, Scoresby, The Basin, Wantirna and Wantirna South; and parts of Lysterfield, Sassafras, Upper Ferntree Gully, Ringwood, Heathmont and Bayswater North.

== Geography ==
Since 1984, federal electoral division boundaries in Australia have been determined at redistributions by a redistribution committee appointed by the Australian Electoral Commission. Redistributions occur for the boundaries of divisions in a particular state, and they occur every seven years, or sooner if a state's representation entitlement changes or when divisions of a state are malapportioned.

When the division was introduced in 1984, it covered areas in the City of Knox which were previously in the Division of Deakin and Division of La Trobe.

Between 2018 and 2024, the division was co-extensive with the City of Knox local government area. In 2024, it was expanded northwards to include a portion of the City of Maroondah south of Canterbury Road and east of EastLink.

Since the 2024 redistribution, the division covered all of City of Knox, and southern portions of City of Maroondah.

== History ==
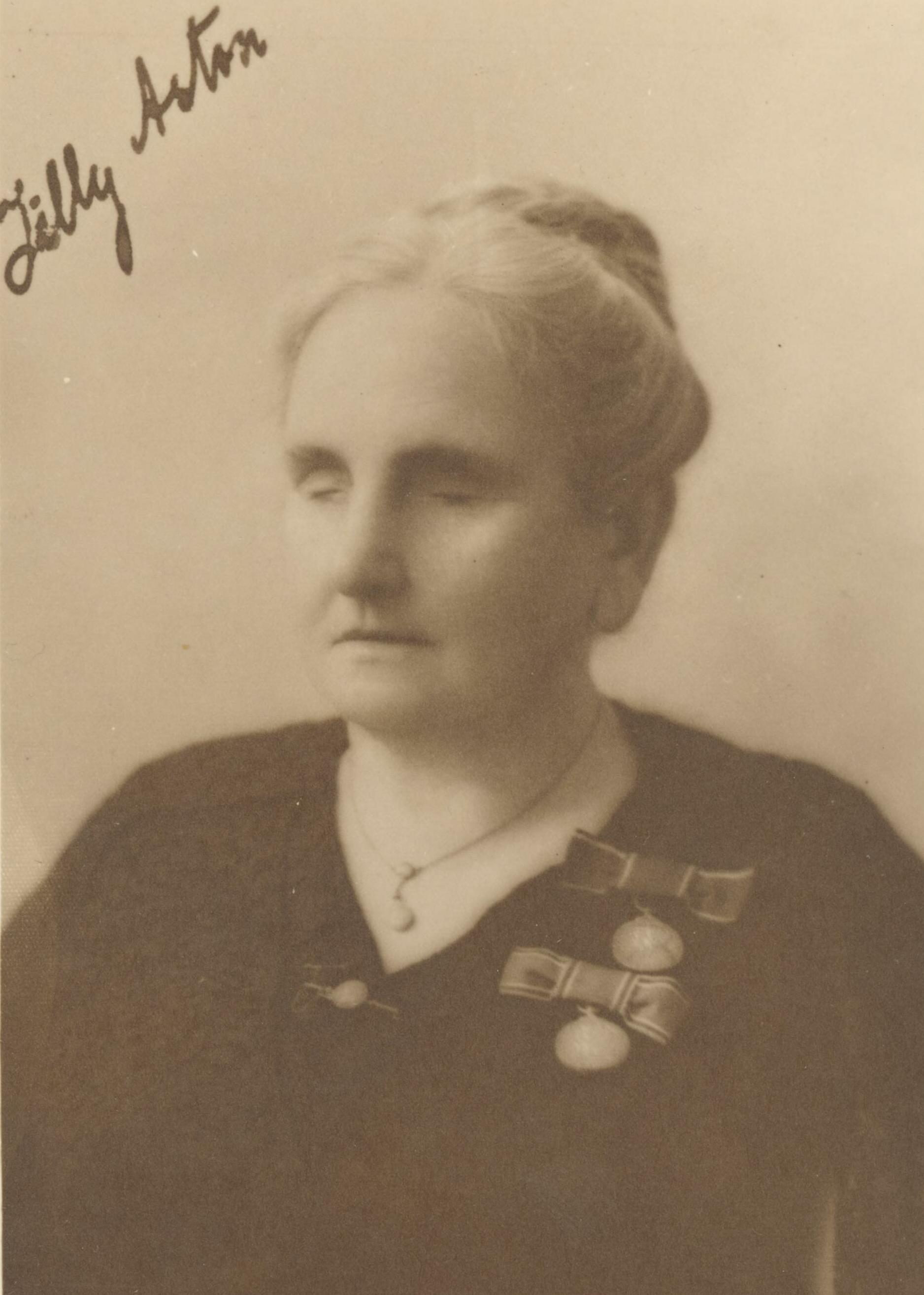
Tilly Aston, the division's namesake

The division was created in 1984 and is named after Tilly Aston, a blind writer and teacher who helped found the Library of the Victorian Association of Braille Writers in 1894.

A typical "mortgage belt" seat, it was held by the Labor Party until 1990, but from then until 2023 it was held by the Liberal Party. At the 2022 Australian federal election it was the Liberal Party’s safest seat in metropolitan Melbourne. However, the seat became marginal at that election, with the Liberals experiencing a 11.64% drop in their primary vote and a 7.32% drop in their two-party vote. The very next year, the Australian Labor Party regained the seat from the Liberal Party following the 2023 by-election. Mary Doyle was elected as the new Labor member in the by-election.

Aston has one of the biggest Chinese-Australian communities in Victoria, with more than 22,500 Chinese residents, or about 14 per cent of the electorate's population.

== Members ==
Image	Member	Party	Term	Notes
	John Saunderson (1948–)	Labor	1 December 1984 – 24 March 1990	Previously held the Division of Deakin. Lost seat
	Peter Nugent (1938–2001)	Liberal	24 March 1990 – 24 April 2001	Died in office
	Chris Pearce (1963–)	Liberal	14 July 2001 – 19 July 2010	Retired
	Alan Tudge (1971–)	Liberal	21 August 2010 – 17 February 2023	Served as minister under Turnbull and Morrison. Resigned in order to retire from politics.
	Mary Doyle (1970–)	Labor	1 April 2023 – present	Incumbent

== Election results ==
2025 Australian federal election: Aston
Party	Candidate	Votes	%	±%
Liberal	Manny Cicchiello	41,382	37.67	−5.15
Labor	Mary Doyle	40,926	37.26	+4.75
Greens	Reuben Steen	12,669	11.53	−0.69
One Nation	John De Wacht	3,738	3.40	+0.34
Family First	Craig Manners	3,006	2.74	+2.74
Trumpet of Patriots	Steve Desveaux	2,526	2.30	+2.22
Independent	Mark Grondman	2,439	2.22	+2.22
Independent	Andrew Williams	2,104	1.92	+1.92
Libertarian	David Fawcett	1,059	0.96	−1.19
Total formal votes		109,849	94.97	−1.61
Informal votes		5,814	5.03	+1.61
Turnout		115,663	94.45	+1.90
Two-party-preferred result
Labor	Mary Doyle	58,690	53.43	+6.04
Liberal	Manny Cicchiello	51,159	46.57	−6.04
Labor gain from Liberal		Swing	+6.04	

Alluvial diagram illustrating the full distribution of preferences in the seat of Aston for the 2025 Federal Election
