= George Sanderson =

George Sanderson may refer to:

- George P. Sanderson (1848–1892), big game hunter in India
- George Henry Sanderson (1824–1893), mayor of San Francisco
- George Sanderson (politician) (1810–1886), mayor of Lancaster, Pennsylvania
- George Pringle Sanderson (1850–1940), Canadian politician from Alberta
- George G. Sanderson (1840–1919), insurance broker, shipowner and political figure in Nova Scotia, Canada
- George K. Sanderson (1844–1893), U.S. Army officer
- George Plaisted Sanderson (1836–1915), mayor of Lynn, Massachusetts
- George A. Sanderson, secretary of the United States Senate
- George Sanderson, a character in the film Monsters, Inc.
- George Sanderson (rugby union)
