= 2001 Aston by-election =

- 14 July 2001
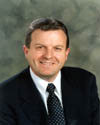

	First party	Second party
Candidate	Chris Pearce	Kieran Boland
Party	Liberal	Labor
Popular vote	31,640	28,716
Percentage	40.73%	36.96%
Swing	▼7.76pp	▼1.55pp
TPP	50.58%	49.42%
TPP swing	▼3.36pp	▲3.36pp
MP before election
Peter Nugent
Liberal
Elected MP
Chris Pearce
Liberal

The 2001 Aston by-election was held in the Australian electorate of Aston in Victoria on 14 July 2001. The by-election was triggered by the death of the sitting member, the Liberal Party of Australia's Peter Nugent, on 24 April 2001. The writ for the by-election was issued on 1 June 2001.

== Background ==
The by-election was an important test for the Liberal Party. The federal Liberal government had introduced a controversial Goods and Services Tax just over a year before, and unpopular sentiment surrounding the government and its GST were believed to have led to the defeat of the Coalition in Western Australia and Queensland state elections in landslides. The Liberals had also lost the seat of Ryan in a recent by-election, and the ALP led by Kim Beazley was ahead in opinion polls.

== Results ==
Aston by-election, 2001
Party	Candidate	Votes	%	±%
Liberal	Chris Pearce	31,640	40.73	−7.76
Labor	Kieran Boland	28,716	36.96	−1.55
Democrats	Pierre Harcourt	6,271	8.07	+0.54
Independent	Garry Scates	3,401	4.38	+4.38
Greens	Mick Kir	1,877	2.42	+2.42
One Nation	June Scott	1,369	1.76	−1.13
Independent	Peter O'Loughlin	1,160	1.49	+1.49
HEMP	Graeme Dunstan	711	0.92	+0.92
Liberals for Forests	Luke James Chamberlain	680	0.88	+0.88
No GST	Mark Sloan	618	0.80	+0.80
Citizens Electoral Council	Doug Mitchell	334	0.43	+0.43
	Josephine Cox	328	0.42	+0.42
Independent	Steve Raskovy	227	0.29	+0.29
Hope	Tim Petherbridge	232	0.30	+0.30
	Mark Ward	126	0.16	+0.16
Total formal votes		77,690	94.16	−3.01
Informal votes		4,819	5.84	+3.01
Turnout		82,509	92.54	−4.10
Two-party-preferred result
Liberal	Chris Pearce	39,299	50.58	−3.66
Labor	Kieran Boland	38,391	49.42	+3.66
Liberal hold		Swing	−3.66	

== Aftermath ==
Chris Pearce won the by-election, retaining Aston for the Liberal Party, but suffering a swing of 3.66%. Prime Minister John Howard appeared on the first episode of the ABC program Insiders the next day, where he suggested that Labor's electoral momentum had been held in check, and the government was back in the game:

I believe that the Government is well and truly back in the game. If there were an unstoppable momentum for Labor to win the federal election, they'd have rolled us over in Aston.

— John Howard, Insiders, ABC TV, 15 July 2001

The Howard government reportedly spent $700,000 on political advertising in the lead-up to the by-election.

== See also ==
- List of Australian federal by-elections
- 2023 Aston by-election
