= Jawun =

- Named after: Word for 'family or friend' in Kuku Yalanji language
- Formation: 2001
- Founder: Noel Pearson
- Founded at: Cape York Peninsula
- Website: jawun.org.au

Jawun (formerly named Indigenous Enterprise Partnerships) is an Australian, non-profit organisation which manages secondments from the corporate and public sectors to a range of Aboriginal and Torres Strait Islander partner organisations in urban, regional and remote communities across Australia.

== Name ==
Jawun means 'family or friend' in the Kuku Yalanji language of Cape York, Queensland.

== Operating model ==
Under the Jawun operating model, Indigenous partners determine their development priorities. Working with Jawun, these partners identify projects and areas for secondee support, then Jawun engages corporate and government secondees who apply their skills to assist Indigenous partners in achieving their development goals, while simultaneously gaining an opportunity for personal and professional growth. Generally, secondments are six weeks in length.

== History ==
Jawun was established in 2001 when the Boston Consulting Group and Westpac seconded several executives to work with Indigenous Australian leaders in communities in Cape York. The model for Jawun was based on concepts in Noel Pearson's 2000 book Our Right To Take Responsibility.

Since 2001, Jawun has expanded to include a total of 12 regions across Australia; Cape York, Goulburn Murray, East Kimberley, Inner Sydney, Central Coast, West Kimberley, Central Australia (NPY lands), North East Arnhem Land, Far West Coast of South Australia, Lower River Murray, South West Australia, and the Pilbara.

Jawun now partners with over 100 Indigenous organisations, and 30 corporate/government organisations, with more than 5000 employees from secondment partners having taken part in Jawun immersions with Indigenous Australian organisations.

The Australian Public Service commenced participation in Jawun in 2012. Staff from agencies including the Defence Materiel Organisation, and the Australian Taxation Office, have participated since that time. In 2015, an Australian Public Service Commission evaluation found participation in Jawun was delivering significant professional development for public service staff.

A KPMG review of Jawun, delivered in February 2022, found that Jawun had brought benefits both to communities and to their corporate and government partners. The review was funded by the Australian Government and Westpac.
