= William Sanderson (footballer) =

English footballer

Personal information
- Date of birth: 1885
- Place of birth: Walbottle, England
- Date of death: 1911 (aged 25–26)
- Position: Winger

Senior career*
Years	Team	Apps	(Gls)
1904–1905	Scotswood		
1905–1906	Barrow		
1906–1910	Preston North End	45	(6)
Total		45	(6)
- * Club domestic league appearances and goals

William Sanderson (1885–1911) was an English footballer who played in the Football League for Preston North End.
