= Graeme Dunstan (activist) =

Australian activist (born 1942)

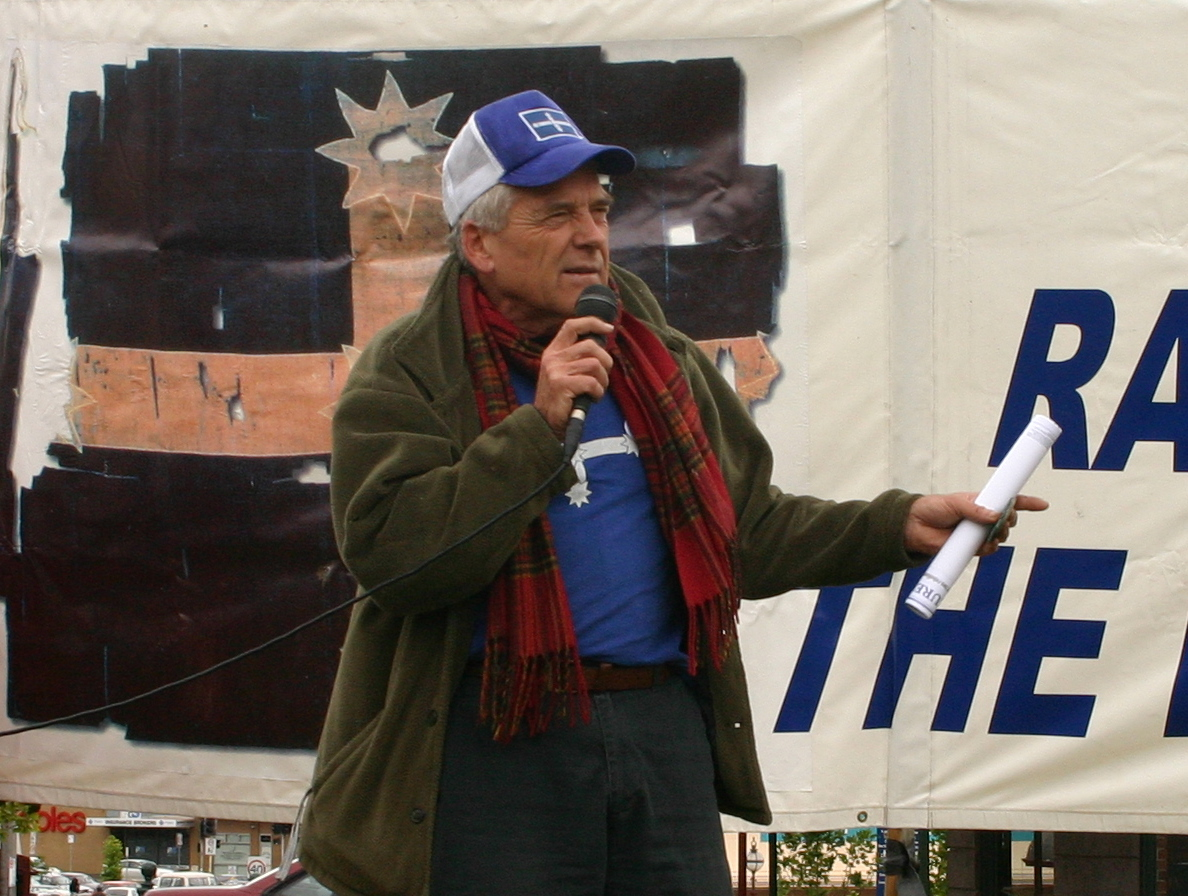
Graeme Dunstan at the 2005 Eureka Stockade Commemoration accepting a Eureka Australia Day Medal for his many years of social activism

Graeme Clement Dunstan (born 4 August 1942) is an Australian activist who, alongside Johnny Allen, was an organiser of the 1973 Aquarius Festival in Nimbin, New South Wales.

== Biography ==
Dunstan graduated in engineering from the University of New South Wales (UNSW), where he served as president of the Students' Union in 1967 and twice as co-editor of Tharunka, the student newspaper.

As president of the UNSW Labor Club, Dunstan organised protests against the Vietnam War and gained national attention in 1966 when, as part of the "LBJ Welcome Committee", he lay beneath US president Lyndon B. Johnson's motorcade during its Sydney visit.

Starting in 1972 he worked alongside Johnny Allen to co-produced the Aquarius Festival in Nimbin, New South Wales which was held in May 1973.

Dunstan later held various positions promoting community and cultural initiatives. From 1981 to 1985 he was the first community arts officer for the City of Campbelltown, advocating for the creation of the Campbelltown Regional Art Gallery. As a consultant to the Victorian Tourism Commission (1985–1989), he helped initiate the Melbourne International Comedy Festival, serving as its founding secretary.

In 2001, he was a candidate for the HEMP (Help End Marijuana Prohibition) Party in the Aston by-election.
