= Cobden =

Cobden may refer to:

== People ==
- Ellen Melicent Cobden, British writer and suffragist
- Harry Cobden, British jockey
- Richard Cobden, British manufacturer and politician

== Places ==
Australia

- Cobden, Victoria
  - Cobden Football Club

Canada

- Cobden, Ontario

New Zealand

- Cobden, New Zealand

United States

- Cobden, Illinois
- Cobden, Minnesota

== Other uses ==
- Cobden Bridge, Southampton, England

== See also ==
- Cobdenism, an economic theory named for Richard Cobden
