= Peter Nugent =

Australian politician (1938–2001)

Member of the Australian Parliament for Aston
- In office 24 March 1990 – 24 April 2001
- Preceded by: John Saunderson
- Succeeded by: Chris Pearce

Personal details
- Born: 1 April 1938 Chelmsford, Essex, England
- Died: 24 April 2001 (aged 63) Melbourne, Victoria, Australia
- Party: Liberal
- Occupation: Air force officer

Peter Edward Nugent (1 April 1938 – 24 April 2001) was an English-born Australian politician. He was a member of the Liberal Party and served in the House of Representatives from 1990 until his death in 2001, representing the Victorian seat of Aston. He was known for his interest in human rights and Aboriginal affairs policy and briefly served as a shadow minister under John Hewson. He was born in England and served in the Royal Air Force before immigrating to Australia in 1977.

== Early life ==
Nugent was born on 1 April 1938 in Chelmsford, Essex, England. He served in the Royal Air Force (RAF) from 1953 to 1977, spending periods in Singapore and Cyprus and receiving the General Service Medal in connection with his service in Malaya. He retired with the rank of squadron leader.

Nugent moved to Australia in 1977 and worked as a marketing and sales director in the IT industry. He worked for the Australian division of International Computers Limited (ICL) for a number of years, including as network services manager of the Melbourne branch and manager of the ACT branch.

== Politics ==
Nugent joined the Liberal Party in 1980. He was a branch president from 1982 to 1989, standing unsuccessfully in the safe Australian Labor Party (ALP) seat of La Trobe at the 1983 federal election.

At the 1990 election, Nugent defeated the incumbent ALP member John Saunderson in the outer Melbourne seat of Aston. He was re-elected at the 1993, 1996 and 1998 elections, serving until his death in office in 2001. Nugent served as shadow minister for Aboriginal affairs under John Hewson from 1993 to 1994. He was a member of a number of parliamentary committees, including as chair of the House standing committee on procedure and the joint statutory committee on the National Crime Authority. In 2000 he was the chair of the human rights sub-committee which delivered a report into religious freedom in Australia.

=== Political views ===
Nugent was described as a wet and small-l liberal. In parliament his interests included human rights policy, Aboriginal affairs, foreign policy and defence policy. He was a parliamentary representative on the Council for Aboriginal Reconciliation and chair of the parliamentary supporters of Amnesty International. Nugent was publicly critical of Pauline Hanson during her rise to prominence and opposed the Howard government's response to the Wik decision. According to the Australian Jewish News, he held "pro-Palestine, anti-Israel views" and publicly criticised Israeli settlements on a number of occasions. He was a member of the Parliamentary Friends of Palestine and visited Palestinian refugee camps in Israel in 1998.

== Personal life ==
Nugent had two children with his wife Carol. He died at his home in Melbourne on 24 April 2001, aged 63.

Parliament of Australia
Preceded by John Saunderson	Member for Aston; 1990–2001	Succeeded by Chris Pearce
