= Chris Pearce (politician) =

Australian politician (born 1963)

The Honourable Chris Pearce
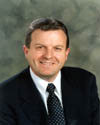

Member of the Australian Parliament for Aston
- In office 14 July 2001 – 19 July 2010
- Preceded by: Peter Nugent
- Succeeded by: Alan Tudge

Personal details
- Born: 1 March 1963 (age 63) Lismore, New South Wales, Australia
- Party: Liberal Party of Australia
- Spouse: Andrea Pearce
- Education: Monash University
- Occupation: Business executive

Christopher John Pearce (born 1 March 1963) is an Australian business executive and former politician. He was a member of the House of Representatives from 2001 to 2010, representing seat of Aston for the Liberal Party. He served as a parliamentary secretary in the Howard government from 2004 to 2007. Outside of his political career he has worked as a senior executive in the IT and telecommunications industries.

== Early life ==
Pearce was born on 1 March 1963 in Lismore, New South Wales. He holds the degree of Bachelor of Business from Monash University, and later completed an MBA at Deakin University and a graduate certificate at the University of Divinity.

Prior to entering parliament, Pearce worked as a manager in the information technology and telecommunications industry. He began his career as a marketing executive with Yamaha Music Australia, later working for Telstra as manager of its MobileNet marketing campaign, as a marketing director with United Telecommunications, as a marketing vice-president with Iridium Satellite, and as Australian managing director of BAE Systems.

== Politics ==
Pearce joined the Liberal Party in 1992 and was president of its Rowville branch from 1996 to 1999. He also served on the Knox City Council from 1997 to 2000.

Pearce was elected to the House of Representatives at the 2001 Aston by-election, retaining the seat for the Liberal Party following the death of incumbent MP Peter Nugent. He was re-elected at the 2001, 2004 and 2007 federal elections. Pearce was parliamentary secretary to Treasurer Peter Costello from 2004 to 2007. He was responsible for the Howard government's proposed changes to financial services legislation, reported in 2006 as "the biggest overhaul since the corporate law economic reform program began in 1997".

In September 2008, Pearce was included in Malcolm Turnbull's shadow ministry with responsibility for the financial services, superannuation and corporate law portfolio. He served as a shadow minister until June 2009, when he announced that he would retire from federal politics at the next election.

== Later activities ==
In July 2010, it was reported that Pearce would join Telstra as a business development executive responsible for contracts with government agencies. He was appointed chair of Anglicare Victoria in 2016. He was appointed as an adjunct professor at Deakin Business School in 2019 and has also served as deputy chair of the St. Vincent's Institute of Medical Research.

Parliament of Australia
Preceded by Peter Nugent	Member for Aston; 2001–10	Succeeded by Alan Tudge
Preceded by Ross Cameron	Parliamentary Secretary to the Treasurer; 2004–07	Succeeded by Chris Bowen
