= John Saunderson =

Australian politician (born 1948)

Member of the Australian Parliament for Aston
- In office 1 December 1984 – 24 March 1990
- Preceded by: New seat
- Succeeded by: Peter Nugent

Member of the Australian Parliament for Deakin
- In office 5 March 1983 – 1 December 1984
- Preceded by: Alan Jarman
- Succeeded by: Julian Beale

Personal details
- Born: 31 May 1948 (age 77) Berkshire, England
- Party: Australian Labor Party
- Occupation: Technical officer

John Saunderson (born 31 May 1948) is a former Australian politician and trade unionist. He was an Australian Labor Party member of the Australian House of Representatives from 1983 to 1990, representing the electorates of Deakin (1983–84) and Aston (1984–90).

== Early life ==
Saunderson was born on 31 May 1948 in Slough, England. He was a senior technical officer for Telecom from 1964 to 1980, state president of the Australian Telecommunications Employees Association from 1976 to 1980, and an industrial officer for the union from 1980 until 1983.

== Political career ==
In 1983, Saunderson was elected to the Australian House of Representatives as the Labor member for Deakin, and in 1984 successfully contested the new seat of Aston. A convenor of the Labor Left faction in the later years of the Hawke government, Saunderson was a consistent opponent of attempts to privatise government assets, opposed uranium sales to France, played a significant role in the defeat of the Australia Card by opposing his own government's bill as a member of the select committee into it, supported restricting negative gearing to assist first-home buyers, heavily criticised the Cain state government over its handling of tramway disputes, supported broadcasting legislation reform in response to the Alan Bond scandal, opposed liberalising foreign ownership of television stations, and supported the introduction of pay television.

He was defeated by Liberal candidate Peter Nugent at the 1990 election amidst a large anti-Labor swing related to the collapse of the State Bank of Victoria.

== Later activities ==
After his defeat, Saunderson returned to his old union, which became the Communications, Electrical and Plumbing Union, as a policy and research officer and then industrial officer.

Parliament of Australia
Preceded by Alan Jarman	Member for Deakin; 1983–1984	Succeeded by Julian Beale
Preceded by New seat	Member for Aston; 1984–1990	Succeeded by Peter Nugent
