= Sanderson (politician) =

Brazilian politician (born 1969)

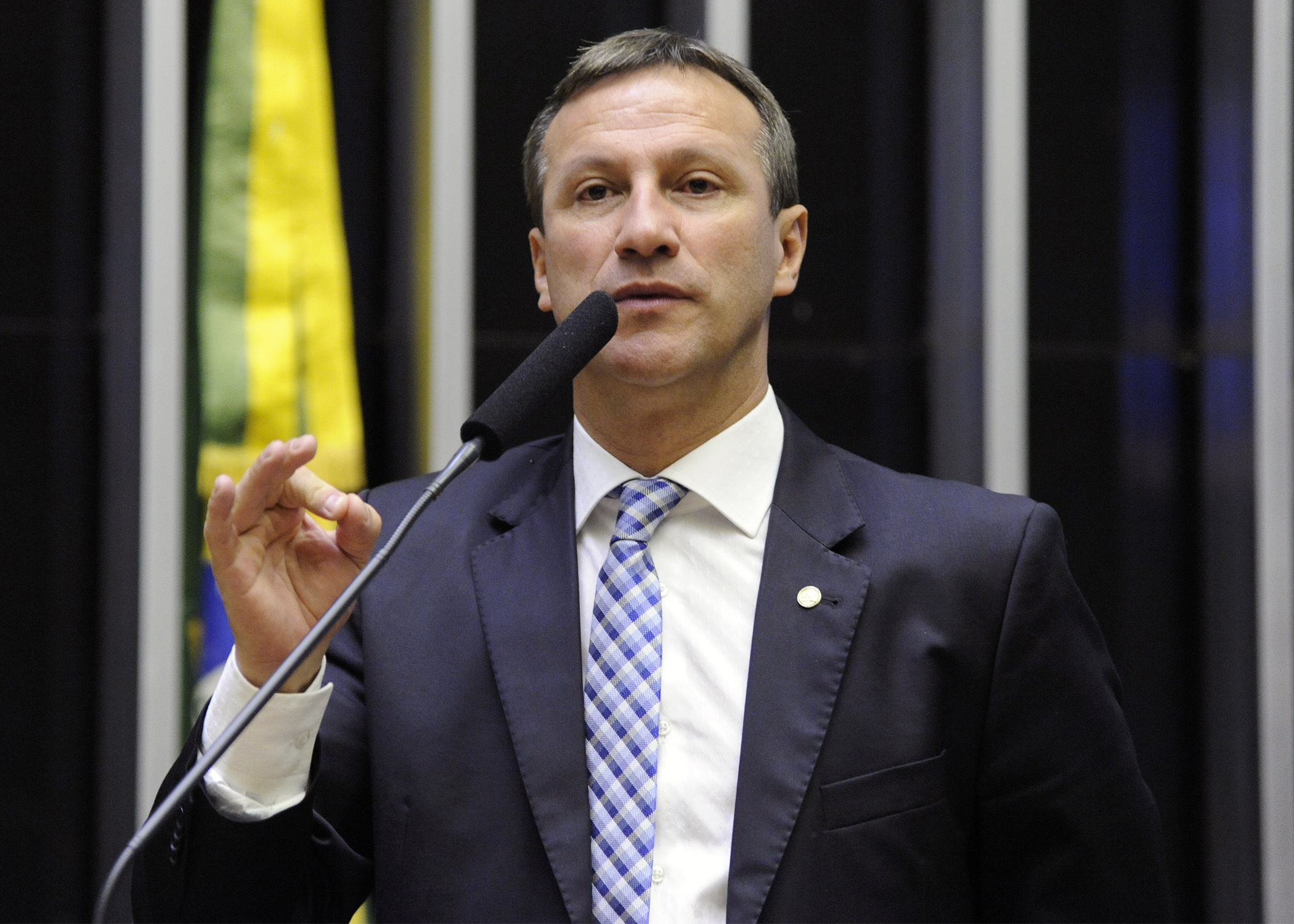
- Sanderson in 2023

Member of the Chamber of Deputies
- Incumbent
- Assumed office 1 February 2019
- Constituency: Rio Grande do Sul

Personal details
- Born: 1 December 1969 (age 56) Erechim, RS
- Party: Liberal Party (since 2022)
- Other political affiliations: PSL (2018-2022)

Ubiratan Antunes Sanderson (born 1 December 1969), known mononymously as Sanderson, is a Brazilian politician serving as a member of the Chamber of Deputies since 2019. In 2023, he served as chairman of the public security committee.

He is a member of the Liberal Party and of the Inter-Parliamentary Alliance on China (IPAC).

== Biography ==
Sanderson holds a law degree and a specialization in Public Security and Civil Service Ethics from the National Police Academy, as well as a postgraduate degree in Public Security Management. Sanderson has a 23-year career with the Federal Police. He served as president of the Rio Grande do Sul Federal Police Union.

== Election results ==
Year	Election	Position	Party	Votes	Result
2018	State of Rio Grande do Sul	Federal deputy	PSL	88.559 (1.61%)	Elected
2022	State of Rio Grande do Sul	Federal deputy	PL	86.600	Elected
