= Jodie Haydon =

Australian financial planner and women's advocate

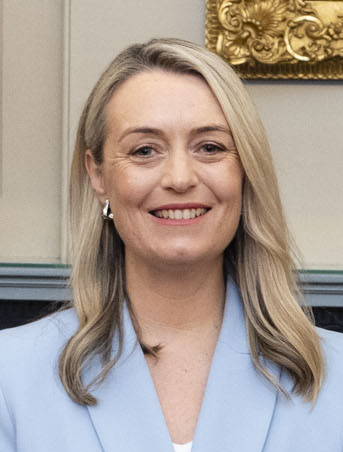
- Haydon in 2023

Spouse of the Prime Minister of Australia
- Assumed role 23 May 2022
- Prime Minister: Anthony Albanese
- Preceded by: Jenny Morrison

Personal details
- Born: 1978 or 1979 (age 47–48) Bankstown, New South Wales, Australia
- Spouse: Anthony Albanese (m. 2025)
- Education: Kincumber High School
- Occupation: Financial services professional

Jodie Haydon (born 1978 or 1979) is an Australian financial services professional. She is married to the 31st (and current) prime minister of Australia, Anthony Albanese.

== Early life and education ==
Jodie Haydon was born in 1978 or 1979 in Bankstown, Sydney, and grew up on the Central Coast of New South Wales. She is the daughter of two teachers.

She attended Kincumber High School. She dropped out of university to work in the superannuation industry.

== Career ==
Haydon has had a career in superannuation spanning twenty years in banking and finance companies including industry superannuation funds. In February 2022, Haydon was hired in a new position as women's officer, following her role as a union delegate for the NSW Public Service Association.

As of May 2025 she is head of strategic partnerships at Teachers Mutual Bank.

=== Activities as PM's partner ===
Haydon accompanied Albanese during both the 2022 and 2025 Australian federal election campaigns. She subsequently accompanied him on official prime ministerial visits to Dubai, Madrid, Spain, and Paris. She accompanied him as a guest at the state funeral of Queen Elizabeth II in London in September 2022, and a White House state dinner hosted by US President Joe Biden and First Lady Jill Biden in October 2023.

== Personal life ==
Haydon met Anthony Albanese in October 2019 at a business dinner in Melbourne, where he was a speaker. They both followed the rugby league team South Sydney Rabbitohs, and lived near each other in Sydney's Inner West. Albanese and his wife of 19 years, Carmel Tebbutt, had separated in early 2019.

On 14 February 2024, the couple became engaged. They married on 29 November 2025 at a private ceremony in the prime minister's official residence, The Lodge.

Honorary titles
Preceded by Jenny Morrison	Spouse of the prime minister of Australia; 2022–present	Incumbent
