= Simon Kennedy =

Australian politician

Simon Kennedy MP

Member of the Australian Parliament for Cook
- Incumbent
- Assumed office 13 April 2024
- Preceded by: Scott Morrison

Personal details
- Born: Simon Peter Kennedy; 4 June 1982 (age 44) Sydney, New South Wales, Australia
- Party: Liberal
- Spouse: Nila Dharan
- Children: 2
- Education: University of New South Wales (LLB, BCom)
- Occupation: Management consultant
- Website: simonkennedymp.com.au

Simon Peter Kennedy (born 4 June 1982) is an Australian politician. He is a member of the House of Representatives, representing the Liberal Party in the Division of Cook. He was first elected at the 2024 Cook by-election and retained the seat at the 2025 Australian federal election. Before entering parliament he was a lawyer and management consultant.

On 14 September 2025, Kennedy was appointed to the Shadow Ministry, holding the portfolios of Shadow Assistant Minister for Artificial Intelligence, Shadow Assistant Minister for the Digital Economy, and Shadow Assistant Minister for the Scrutiny of Government Waste.

In February 2026, he was promoted to Shadow Assistant Minister for Finance and Shadow Assistant Minister to the Leader of the Opposition. He was also appointed co-chair of the parliamentary Liberal Party’s policy development committee.

== Early life and education ==
Kennedy was born in West Ryde, Sydney. Since his mother worked full time as a teacher, he was substantially raised by his grandfather, a World War II veteran. His grandmother had also seen wartime service, as an Army Nurse.

He attended Epping Boys High School, where his mother and stepfather both taught. Kennedy was elected school captain, became the President of the students' representative council and served on the Ryde City Youth Council.

In 2006, he graduated in law and commerce from the University of New South Wales.

== Consulting career ==
Kennedy's career has centred on the public sector. Having graduated from university, he was hired by the law firm Clayton Utz, where he provided advice on energy reforms to the Department of Prime Minister and Cabinet.

However, he soon moved to McKinsey & Company. He spent 14 years at the management consultancy as an analyst; first in Sydney but later in New York and Washington, D.C. Reported projects included government level assignments in North America, Asia and the Caribbean nation of Haiti. He returned to Sydney in 2016 to establish the firm's Australian Public Sector Practice, and was made a partner.

While in this role, he provided strategic advice to government for its Covid response, and served on the Committee for Sydney, developing plans for innovation precincts in the Greater Sydney area. After leaving McKinsey in 2022, he formed the tech investment firm Banksia with former Uber executive Damian Kassabgi.

== Politics ==
Kennedy first ran for parliament in 2022 unsuccessfully, but succeeded in winning a federal seat in 2024. The Age has reported that Kennedy is aligned with the National Right faction of the Liberal Party, although political commentator Niki Savva has written that he has declined to identify with any faction.

=== 2022 Australian federal election ===
Kennedy made a bid to succeed the retiring member for the Division of Bennelong, John Alexander. Although historically considered to be a safe Liberal seat, Labor's Jerome Laxale won the two-candidate-preferred count 50.98% to Kennedy's 49.02%.

Regarding the COVID-19 pandemic, Kennedy indicated some libertarian preferences. At an event called A Stand in the Park he expressed concerns about the vaccine mandates which restricted travel and business. In a later radio interview, he clarified his view, saying:

I'm pro-vaccine. I'm pro-science. Of course me and my family are fully vaccinated. My wife's an infectious disease doctor, worked throughout the pandemic on the frontline with the doctors and nurses, to get us to 95% vaccination... But I'm not about shouting people down if they have a different opinion to mine.

=== Entering Parliament ===
In early 2024 the Division of Cook became open, with a by-election slated for Saturday 13 April. Kennedy and his family moved into the community before the vote, making their home in Woolooware, then began campaigning in shops and beaches.

Six contenders were considered by 300 local members of the Liberal Party. Other candidates for preselection included then-mayor of Sutherland Shire Carmelo Pesce, Benjamin Britton, and Gwen Cherne, the Veteran Family Advocate Commissioner.

In the meeting of party members on 4 March, Kennedy won the Liberal preselection to contest the seat. He had won support from several party elders in the process, including former NSW Premiers Nick Greiner and Dominic Perrottet, then state Liberal leader Mark Speakman, along with sitting federal parliamentarians Angus Taylor and Senator Dave Sharma. Conversely, Labor announced they would not contest the seat, leaving the Greens candidate Martin Moore as Kennedy's strongest opponent. Kennedy's campaign message was reported to be aspirational, supporting Australians who want to improve their lives.

On 13 April 2024, Kennedy won the 2024 Cook by-election with an increased share of votes for the Liberal Party, both in primary votes and in the two-candidate preferred result, in which Kennedy received 71% of the vote. He was sworn into Parliament in Canberra on 14 May 2024.

==== Shadow Ministry ====
On 14 September 2025, Opposition Leader Sussan Ley appointed Kennedy to the Coalition's Shadow Ministry. He was tasked with three newly created assistant portfolios: Shadow Assistant Minister for Artificial Intelligence, Shadow Assistant Minister for the Digital Economy, and Shadow Assistant Minister for the Scrutiny of Government Waste.

=== Parliament ===
In his first speech to Parliament, Kennedy spoke of generational inequality and argued for deregulation of small businesses and for a mechanism where states and councils would compete for funding, with money going to those who can deliver services like housing, healthcare, and infrastructure quickly and effectively.

Right now, our country is governed for the squeaky wheel, the vested interests, the large corporates with their lobbyists and their megaphones, it's not for the silent majority and definitely not for the small businesses... The promise of the next generation being better off than their parents is now disappearing rapidly and it is hard to tell what this could do to Australia's social fabric if allowed to continue.

Kennedy was returned to Parliament in the 2025 Australian federal election, with ABC reporting him winning 57.2% of the two-party-preferred vote.

=== Policy positions ===
==== Energy and climate ====
Kennedy has stated that climate and energy policy should prioritise reducing emissions while maintaining affordable and reliable power, with an emphasis on technology-driven solutions and a technology-neutral energy mix. In parliamentary debate, he argued that governments should focus on outcomes rather than particular technologies, asking "how can we get more clean energy at a lower cost?" and criticising approaches that privilege specific technologies over results. He has warned that rapid growth in artificial intelligence and advanced manufacturing would significantly increase electricity demand, arguing that future energy policy must account for large-scale, continuous power requirements.

During internal Liberal Party debates in late 2025 over whether to retain the party's commitment to net zero emissions by 2050, several outlets characterised Kennedy's position as undecided. The Australian Financial Review reported that he was among four MPs regarded as unclear on whether to retain the target, a view also reflected in reporting by The Australian and Sky News.

According to political commentator Niki Savva, Kennedy had earlier stood out during a party-room discussion as the only Liberal MP to even tentatively express support for net zero emissions targets, warning colleagues that the party needed to be "serious on climate and reducing energy prices" to avoid electoral backlash. Savva reports that Kennedy nevertheless stopped short of a firm public commitment to net zero, instead emphasising innovation and technology as the means to reduce emissions and electricity costs.

==== Gambling reform ====
Kennedy is a co-chair of the Parliamentary Friends of Gambling Harm Minimisation alongside Labor MP Mike Freelander and independent MP Kate Chaney. He has publicly stated there is a "unity ticket in this parliament to address gambling harm" and supports a ban on gambling advertising, criticising the reliance of major parties on gambling revenue.

== Personal life ==
Kennedy is married to Nila Dharan, an American-born infectious disease doctor whom he met while working overseas. The couple have two children.

A runner, Kennedy won the 2024 "Fit for Office" challenge to be crowned Australia's fittest federal politician. (Note: Kennedy logged 6,444 MEPs (Myzone Effort Points) during the three-week challenge, surpassing previous champion Andrew Leigh. He cited a structured exercise regimen and weight loss as factors in reducing his blood pressure from 132/88 to 120/75.)

== Notes ==
Parliament of Australia
| Preceded by Scott Morrison | Member for Cook; 2024–present | Incumbent |
