= Division of Cook =

Australian federal electoral division

Coordinates: 34.031°S 151.100°E

Cook Australian House of Representatives Division
- Interactive map of electorate boundaries
- Created: 1969; 57 years ago
- MP: Simon Kennedy
- Party: Liberal
- Namesake: James Cook; Joseph Cook
- Electors: 118,924 (2025)
- Area: 67 km^{2} (25.9 sq mi)
- Demographic: Inner metropolitan
Electorates around Cook:
Banks	Barton	Kingsford Smith
Hughes	Cook	Tasman Sea
Hughes	Hughes	Tasman Sea

The Division of Cook is an Australian electoral division in the state of New South Wales. It is located in Southern Sydney south-southwest of Botany Bay, stretching from Kirrawee to Kurnell, and encompassing Sans Souci to the north.

Since 2024, its MP has been Simon Kennedy of the Liberal Party. From 2007 to 2024, the seat was held by Scott Morrison, who served as Prime Minister of Australia from 2018 to 2022.

== History ==
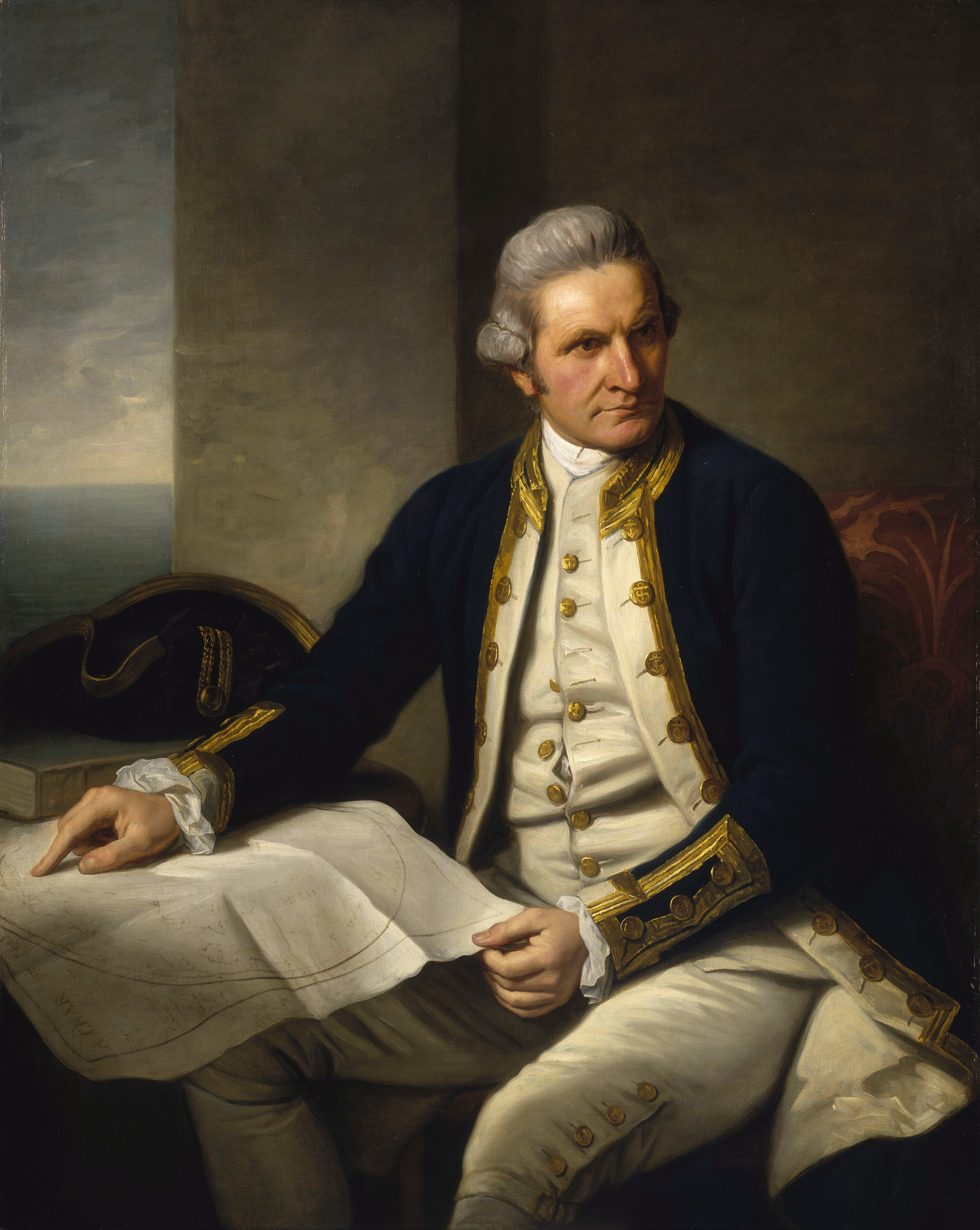
James Cook, the original namesake of the division

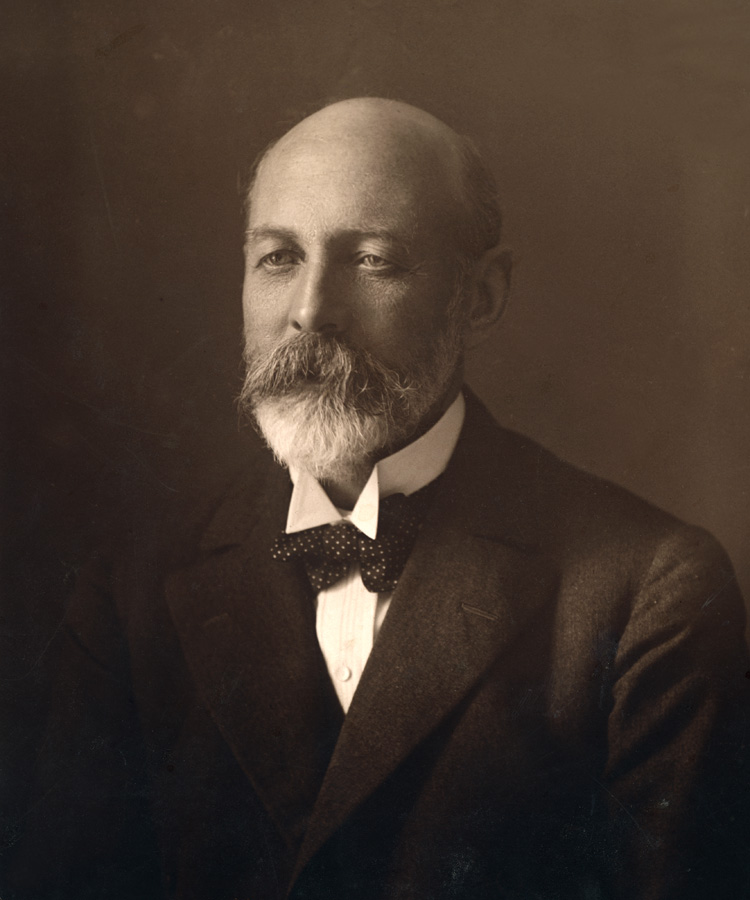
Joseph Cook, the joint namesake of the division since 2024

Cook was created in 1969, mostly out of the Liberal-leaning areas of the neighbouring Division of Hughes. It was a natural choice for that seat's one-term Liberal member, Don Dobie, to transfer after the creation of Cook erased his majority in Hughes. The division was originally named in honour of James Cook, who mapped the east coast of Australia in 1770. In 2006, the Australian Electoral Commission's Redistribution Committee for New South Wales proposed that the division be jointly named for Joseph Cook, Prime Minister of Australia from 1913 to 1914, but this did not eventuate at the time. In 2024, the namesake was officially expanded to include Joseph Cook, granting recognition to him alongside other former Prime Ministers who have divisions named in their honour.

For most of the first quarter-century of its existence, Cook was a marginal to fairly safe Liberal seat; it has been in Liberal hands for all but two terms. The Liberal majority ballooned with the party's national landslide victory at the 1996 general election, and since then Cook has been a "blue ribbon" safe seat for the Liberal Party.

In 2007, following news of Baird's impending retirement, the seat attracted significant media attention due to the controversial preselection of Liberal candidate Michael Towke. Allegations surfaced that Towke had engaged in branch-stacking and had embellished his curriculum vitae; although these allegations were subsequently proven false, the damage was done. In August 2007, Towke was disendorsed as the Liberal candidate and was replaced with Morrison, a former director of the New South Wales Liberal Party. Morrison won the seat at the election while suffering a swing of six percent, the only time since 1996 that the Liberals' hold on it has been remotely threatened. However, he still won enough primary votes to retain the seat outright.

As of the 2019 federal election, it is the safest metropolitan Coalition seat, with a 19-point swing needed for Labor to win it.

Prominent members include Dobie, who held the seat from its 1969 creation until his retirement in 1996 (with a brief break from 1972 to 1975); Bruce Baird, a former Deputy Leader of the Liberal Party of New South Wales before his move into federal politics; and Scott Morrison, former Prime Minister of Australia (2018–2022).

== Geography ==
The division is located in the southern suburbs of Sydney in parts of the local government areas of Sutherland, Bayside, and Georges River. It includes Burraneer, Caringbah, Caringbah South, Cronulla, Dolans Bay, Dolls Point, Grays Point, Greenhills Beach, Gymea, Gymea Bay, Kangaroo Point, Kareela, Kirrawee, Kurnell, Lilli Pilli, Miranda, Oyster Bay, Port Hacking, Sandringham, Sans Souci, Sylvania, Sylvania Waters, Taren Point, Woolooware, and Yowie Bay; as well as parts of Como, Jannali, Ramsgate, Ramsgate Beach, and Sutherland.

Since 1984, federal electoral division boundaries in Australia have been determined at redistributions by a redistribution committee appointed by the Australian Electoral Commission. Redistributions occur for the boundaries of divisions in a particular state, and they occur every seven years, or sooner if a state's representation entitlement changes or when divisions of a state are malapportioned.

== Members ==
Image	Member	Party	Term	Notes
	Don Dobie (1927–1996)	Liberal	25 October 1969 – 2 December 1972	Previously held the Division of Hughes. Lost seat
	Ray Thorburn (1930–1986)	Labor	2 December 1972 – 13 December 1975	Lost seat
	Don Dobie (1927–1996)	Liberal	13 December 1975 – 29 January 1996	Retired
	Stephen Mutch (1956–)	Liberal	2 March 1996 – 31 August 1998	Previously a member of the New South Wales Legislative Council. Lost preselection and retired
	Bruce Baird (1942–2026)	Liberal	3 October 1998 – 17 October 2007	Previously held the New South Wales Legislative Assembly seat of Northcott. Retired
	Scott Morrison (1968–)	Liberal	24 November 2007 – 28 February 2024	Served as minister under Abbott and Turnbull. Served as Prime Minister from 2018 to 2022. Resigned to retire from politics
	Simon Kennedy (1982–)	Liberal	13 April 2024 – present	Incumbent

== Election results ==
2025 Australian federal election: Cook
Party	Candidate	Votes	%	±%
Liberal	Simon Kennedy	51,121	48.06	−5.66
Labor	Simon Earle	33,474	31.47	+7.46
Greens	Martin Moore	10,575	9.94	+0.50
One Nation	Mark Preston	4,638	4.36	−0.06
Family First	Natalie Fuller	3,310	3.11	+3.11
Trumpet of Patriots	Sharon Hammond	3,246	3.05	+3.05
Total formal votes		106,364	95.47	−0.45
Informal votes		5,044	4.53	+0.45
Turnout		111,408	93.73	+1.84
Two-party-preferred result
Liberal	Simon Kennedy	60,834	57.19	−4.43
Labor	Simon Earle	45,530	42.81	+4.43
Liberal hold		Swing	−4.43	
