= Jenny Morrison =

Australian nurse and political spouse (born 1968)

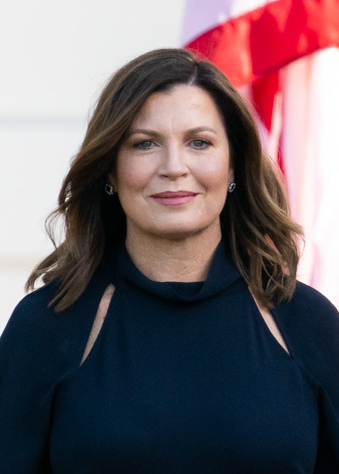
- Morrison in 2019

Spouse of the Prime Minister of Australia
- In role 24 August 2018 – 23 May 2022
- Preceded by: Lucy Turnbull
- Succeeded by: Jodie Haydon

Personal details
- Born: Jennifer Warren; 8 January 1968 (age 58) Canterbury, New South Wales, Australia
- Citizenship: Australian
- Party: Liberal
- Spouse: Scott Morrison (m. 1990)
- Children: 2
- Occupation: Nurse, homemaker

Jennifer Morrison (née Warren; born 8 January 1968) is an Australian former registered nurse and the wife of Scott Morrison, who was the 30th prime minister of Australia from 2018 to 2022.

== Early life and career ==
Morrison was born in Sydney on 8 January 1968. She grew up in Peakhurst, in Sydney's southern suburbs. She was accepted into a university course in costume and theatre design, but deferred and chose to study nursing instead, becoming a registered nurse. She later managed a childcare centre and worked in retail.

== Marriage and children ==
Morrison met her future husband when they were both 12 years old, on a church youth group outing. They began a relationship in senior high school, although they attended different schools, and married in 1990 at the age of 21. She has spoken publicly about their difficulties in conceiving a child. She underwent multiple rounds of IVF and surgery to treat severe endometriosis. They eventually had two daughters, the first of whom was born when she was 39.

== Public life ==
Morrison has stated she was as "shocked as anyone" when her husband became prime minister in August 2018. They chose Kirribilli House in Sydney as their primary residence, although she continued to drive her daughters to their school in the Sutherland Shire. In a May 2019 interview with The Sydney Morning Herald, she stated that she would "probably be less political than maybe the spouses that have gone before me", and that she would model herself on Zara Holt. Morrison has worn Australian designers in her public appearances and was described by Carla Zampatti as "a wonderful Australian fashion ambassador".

Honorary titles
Preceded by Lucy Turnbull	Spouse of the Prime Minister of Australia; 2018–2022	Succeeded by Jodie Haydon
