= 2024 Cook by-election =

- 13 April 2024

Division of Cook (NSW) in the House of Representatives

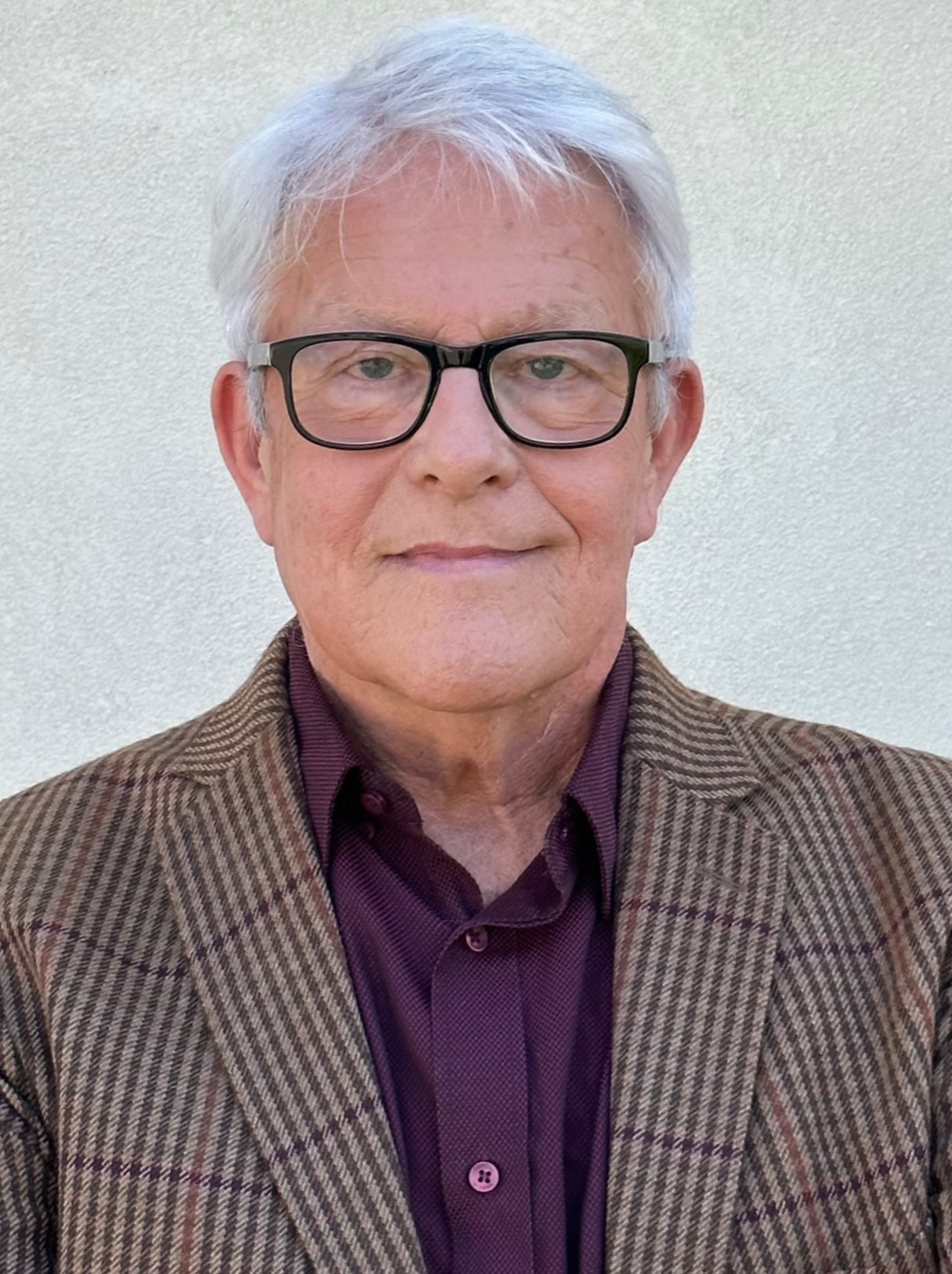
	First party	Second party
Candidate	Simon Kennedy	Martin Moore
Party	Liberal	Greens
Primary vote	53,799	13,649
Percentage	62.67%	16.45%
Swing	▲7.14	▲6.55
TCP	71.25%	28.75%
TCP swing	▲8.81	▲28.75
MP before election
Scott Morrison
Liberal
Elected MP
Simon Kennedy
Liberal

The 2024 Cook by-election was held on 13 April 2024 to elect the member for Cook in the Australian House of Representatives, following the resignation of Liberal MP and former prime minister Scott Morrison.

Morrison's resignation was first announced on 23 January 2024, and came into effect on 28 February 2024.

Liberal candidate Simon Kennedy succeeded Morrison as the new member for Cook. It was the fourth and final federal by-election to have taken place since the first sitting of the 47th Parliament.

== Background ==
=== Seat details ===
Cook encompasses much of Sutherland Shire in Sydney's southern suburbs. It was first contested at the 1969 Australian federal election and named after naval captain and explorer James Cook. It has been held by the Liberal Party for all but two terms, the lone exception being 1972–1975 when the Australian Labor Party held the seat. The Liberal margin swelled in the Coalition's 1996 victory. Since then, Cook has been one of the safest Liberal seats in metropolitan Australia.

=== Demographics ===
During the 2021 Australian census, Cook's median age of 42 exceeded both the national (38) and state (39) medians. In the realm of economic indicators, the median personal weekly income in Cook amounted to $991, surpassing the corresponding figures for the state and nation, which stood at $813 and $805 respectively. Additionally, the demographic composition of the electorate saw over 60 percent identifying their ancestry as English or Australian.

=== Electoral history ===
Two-party-preferred vote in Cook, 1996–2022
Election	1996	1998	2001	2004	2007	2010	2013	2016	2019	2022
Liberal	62.28%	58.94%	64.00%	63.82%	56.57%	62.66%	66.35%	65.39%	69.02%	62.44%
Labor	37.72%	41.06%	36.00%	36.18%	43.43%	37.34%	33.65%	34.61%	30.98%	37.56%
Government	L/NP	L/NP	L/NP	L/NP	ALP	ALP	L/NP	L/NP	L/NP	ALP

==== 2022 election results ====
At the time of the 2022 election, Morrison sat on a majority of 19 percent, making Cook the safest Coalition seat in metropolitan Australia. He retained the seat with a 62.44% two-party-preferred vote and a 6.58% swing against him. He lost 8.17% of his primary vote from 2019. On the other hand, all other parties who contested the election (Labor, Greens, One Nation and United Australian Party) had increases in their primary votes, being 1.89%, 3.09%, 1.61% and 3.27% respectively. Only Labor had a primary vote of more than 10% (24.99%), while the Green's primary vote was just below 10% (9.90%).

== Candidates ==
Candidates are listed in the order they appeared on the ballot.

Party	Candidate	Background
Libertarian	Vinay Kolhatkar	Author and podcaster.
Animal Justice	Natasha Brown	
Independent	Roger Woodward	Accountant and CFA volunteer.
Greens	Martin Moore	Sutherland Shire Ward A candidate at the 2021 local elections.
Liberal	Simon Kennedy	Candidate for Bennelong at the 2022 federal election.
Sustainable Australia	Simone Francis Gagatam	

=== Liberal ===
On 4 March, former Bennelong candidate Simon Kennedy won Liberal Party preselection. Other candidates were Sutherland Shire mayor Carmelo Pesce, Veteran Family Advocate Commissioner Gwen Cherne (endorsed by former prime minister John Howard) and former United Australia Party candidate Benjamin Britton.

Party	Candidate	Votes	%	±%
Liberal	Simon Kennedy	158	53.37	+53.37
Liberal	Carmelo Pesce	90	30.40	+30.40
Liberal	Gwen Cherne	35	11.82	+11.82
Liberal	Benjamin Britton	13	4.39	+4.39
Total formal votes		296	100.0	

=== Labor ===
On 22 March, the Labor Party announced they would not run a candidate in the by-election. This was the first time since the 2015 North Sydney by-election that they had not contested a federal by-election.

== Results ==
On 16 April 2024 the Australian Electoral Commission declared Simon Kennedy officially elected as the new member for Cook.

2024 Cook by-election
Party	Candidate	Votes	%	±%
Liberal	Simon Kennedy	53,799	62.67	+7.14
Greens	Martin Moore	14,120	16.45	+6.55
Animal Justice	Natasha Brown	5,841	6.80	+6.80
Libertarian	Vinay Kolhatkar	5,117	5.96	+5.96
Independent	Roger Woodward	4,920	5.73	+5.73
Sustainable Australia	Simone Gagatam	2,054	2.39	+2.39
Total formal votes		85,851	93.24	−2.36
Informal votes		6,225	6.76	+2.36
Turnout		92,076	82.28	−10.99
Two-candidate-preferred result
Liberal	Simon Kennedy	61,169	71.25	+8.81
Greens	Martin Moore	24,682	28.75	+28.75
Liberal hold				

== Opinion polling ==
Date	Firm	Sample size	Margin of error	Primary vote							2CP vote	
Date	Firm	Sample size	Margin of error	LIB	GRN	LBT	AJP	SAP	IND	Unsure	LIB	GRN
28 March 2024	uComms (Note: Sponsored by the Australia Institute)	914	± 3.6%	45.4%	12.4%	3.2%	5.4%	3.1%	6.1%	24.4%	65%	35%

== See also ==
- List of Australian federal by-elections
- Electoral results for the Division of Cook
