= Scott Morrison =

Prime Minister of Australia from 2018 to 2022

The Honourable Scott Morrison AC
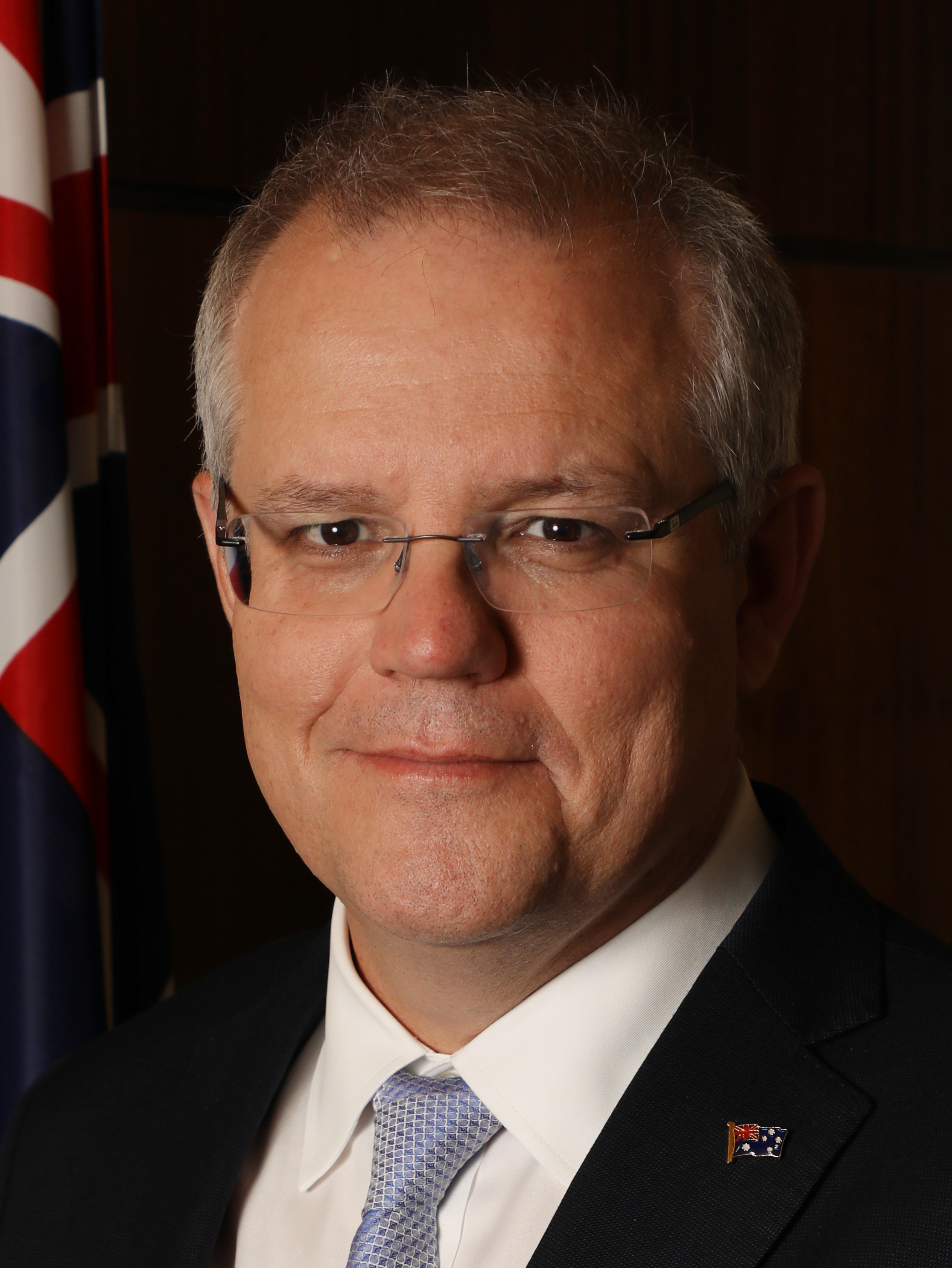
- Official portrait, 2021

30th Prime Minister of Australia
- In office 24 August 2018 – 23 May 2022
- Monarch: Elizabeth II
- Governors General: Sir Peter Cosgrove; David Hurley
- Deputy: Michael McCormack; Barnaby Joyce
- Preceded by: Malcolm Turnbull
- Succeeded by: Anthony Albanese

14th Leader of the Liberal Party
- In office 24 August 2018 – 30 May 2022
- Deputy: Josh Frydenberg
- Preceded by: Malcolm Turnbull
- Succeeded by: Peter Dutton
Ministerial positions
Minister for Industry, Science, Energy and Resources
In office 15 April 2021 – 23 May 2022 Serving with Christian Porter (2021); Melissa Price as Science and Energy (2021–2022); Angus Taylor as Industry (2021–2022)
Prime Minister	Himself
Preceded by	Christian Porter
Succeeded by	Madeleine King
Minister for Home Affairs
In office 6 May 2021 – 23 May 2022 Serving with Karen Andrews
Prime Minister	Himself
Preceded by	Karen Andrews
Succeeded by	Clare O'Neil
Minister for Finance
In office 30 March 2020 – 23 May 2022 Serving with Mathias Cormann (2020); Simon Birmingham (2020–2022)
Prime Minister	Himself
Preceded by	Mathias Cormann
Succeeded by	Katy Gallagher
Minister for Health
In office 14 March 2020 – 23 May 2022 Serving with Greg Hunt
Prime Minister	Himself
Preceded by	Greg Hunt
Succeeded by	Mark Butler
Treasurer of Australia
In office 6 May 2021 – 23 May 2022 Serving with Josh Frydenberg
Prime Minister	Himself
Preceded by	Josh Frydenberg
Succeeded by	Jim Chalmers
In office 21 September 2015 – 28 August 2018
Prime Minister	Malcolm Turnbull
Preceded by	Joe Hockey
Succeeded by	Josh Frydenberg
Minister for the Public Service
In office 29 May 2019 – 8 October 2021
Prime Minister	Himself
Preceded by	Mathias Cormann
Succeeded by	Ben Morton
Minister for Social Services
In office 23 December 2014 – 21 September 2015
Prime Minister	Tony Abbott; Malcolm Turnbull
Preceded by	Kevin Andrews
Succeeded by	Christian Porter
Minister for Immigration and Border Protection
In office 18 September 2013 – 23 December 2014
Prime Minister	Tony Abbott
Preceded by	Tony Burke
Succeeded by	Peter Dutton

Member of the Australian Parliament for Cook
- In office 24 November 2007 – 28 February 2024
- Preceded by: Bruce Baird
- Succeeded by: Simon Kennedy

Personal details
- Born: Scott John Morrison; 13 May 1968 (age 58) Sydney, New South Wales, Australia
- Party: Liberal
- Other political affiliations: Coalition
- Spouse: Jenny Warren (m. 1990)
- Children: 2
- Parent: John Douglas Morrison (father)
- Education: University of New South Wales (BSc Hons)
- Website: scottmorrison.com.au
- Nicknames: ScoMo; Scotty from marketing

Scott John Morrison (born 13 May 1968) is an Australian former politician who served as the 30th prime minister of Australia and the leader of the Liberal Party from 2018 to 2022. He was the member of parliament (MP) for the New South Wales division of Cook from 2007 to 2024.

Morrison was born in Sydney and studied economic geography at the University of New South Wales. He worked as director of the New Zealand Office of Tourism and Sport from 1998 to 2000 and was managing director of Tourism Australia from 2004 to 2006. Morrison also was state director of the New South Wales Liberal Party from 2000 to 2004. He was first elected to the Australian House of Representatives at the 2007 election as a member of parliament (MP) for the division of Cook in New South Wales, and was quickly appointed to the shadow cabinet.

After the Liberal-National coalition's victory at the 2013 election, Morrison was appointed Minister for Immigration and Border Protection in the Abbott government, where he was responsible for implementing Operation Sovereign Borders. In a reshuffle the following year, he became Minister for Social Services and was later promoted to the role of Treasurer in September 2015, after Malcolm Turnbull replaced Abbott as prime minister. In August 2018, Home Affairs Minister Peter Dutton unsuccessfully challenged Turnbull for the leadership of the Liberal Party. Leadership tensions continued, and the party voted to hold a second leadership ballot days later, with Turnbull choosing not to stand. In that ballot, Morrison was seen as a compromise candidate and defeated both Dutton and Foreign Minister Julie Bishop to become party leader and thus prime minister in August 2018.

Morrison won a second term after leading the Coalition to an upset victory in the 2019 election. Morrison's government passed the stage three tax cuts and responded to the COVID-19 pandemic in Australia. Under his leadership, the National Cabinet was established, and Australia received praise during 2020 for being one of the few Western countries to successfully suppress the virus, though the slow initial pace of the COVID-19 vaccination rollout was criticised. Morrison would be involved in several scandals and controversies as prime minister, including his decision to take a holiday during Australia's 2019–20 bushfire season and his government's response to the disaster, his response to the 2021 Parliament sexual misconduct allegations and 2022 Eastern Australia floods and his perceived inaction on climate change. In foreign policy, Morrison oversaw the signing of the AUKUS security pact and increased tensions between Australia and China and Australia and France. Morrison directed logistical support to Ukraine as part of the international effort against Russia in the wake of the 2022 Russian invasion of Ukraine. The government was defeated at the 2022 election and Morrison stepped down as leader of the Liberal Party; Peter Dutton was elected unopposed to replace him.

After leaving office, Morrison became involved in a scandal after it was revealed that he had secretly held several ministerial positions while serving as prime minister, which led to Parliament passing a censure motion against him. He resigned from Parliament on 28 February 2024, and has subsequently worked as an advisor to various lobby groups and as a public speaker.

== Early life and education ==
Morrison was born in the suburb of Waverley in Sydney, the younger of two sons born to Marion (née Smith) and John Douglas Morrison (1934–2020). His father was a policeman who served on the Waverley Municipal Council, including a single term as mayor. Morrison's maternal grandfather was born in New Zealand. His paternal grandmother was the niece of noted Australian poet Dame Mary Gilmore. In 2012, on the 50th anniversary of her death, he delivered a tribute to her in federal parliament. Morrison is descended from William Roberts, a convict who was convicted of stealing yarn and transported to Australia on the First Fleet in 1788.

Morrison grew up in the suburb of Bronte. He had a brief career as a child actor, appearing in several television commercials and small roles in local shows. Morrison attended Sydney Boys High School before going on to complete a Bachelor of Science (B.Sc.) honours degree in applied economic geography at the University of New South Wales. His honours thesis, a demographic analysis of Christian Brethren assemblies in Sydney, was deposited in the University of Manchester Library's Christian Brethren Collection. Morrison contemplated studying theology at Regent College in Vancouver, Canada, but he instead chose to enter the workforce after completing his undergraduate education, in part due to the disapproval of his father.

== Early career ==
After graduating from university, Morrison worked as national policy and research manager for the Property Council of Australia from 1989 to 1995. He then moved into tourism, serving as deputy chief executive of the Australian Tourism Task Force and then general manager of the Tourism Council of Australia; the latter was managed by Bruce Baird, whom he would eventually succeed in federal parliament.

In 1998, Morrison moved to New Zealand to become director of the newly created Office of Tourism and Sport. He formed a close relationship with New Zealand's tourism minister, Murray McCully, and was involved with the creation of the long-running "100% Pure New Zealand" campaign. He left this position in 2000, a year before the contract schedule.

Morrison returned to Australia in 2000, to become state director of the New South Wales division of the Liberal Party. He oversaw the party's campaigns in the 2001 federal election and in the 2003 New South Wales state election.

=== Tourism Australia ===
In 2004, Morrison left the NSW Liberal Party post to become the inaugural managing director of Tourism Australia, which had been established by the Howard government. His appointment was controversial due to its openly political nature. He signed an initial three-year contract. Morrison approved and defended the contentious "So where the bloody hell are you?" advertising campaign featuring Lara Bingle. His contract was terminated in July 2006, which at the time was attributed to conflict with tourism minister Fran Bailey over the government's plans to further integrate the agency into the Australian Public Service. He had been awarded a pay rise by the Remuneration Tribunal three weeks before his sacking. A 2019 investigation by The Saturday Paper suggested Morrison was sacked due to concerns that Tourism Australia was not following government procurement guidelines for three contracts relating to the "So where the bloody hell are you?" campaign, with a total value of $184 million. A 2008 report from the Auditor-General found that "information had been kept from the board, procurement guidelines breached and private companies engaged before paperwork was signed and without appropriate value-for-money assessments". It was suggested that M&C Saatchi, which had previously worked with Morrison on the "100% Pure" campaign in New Zealand, received favourable treatment in the tendering process. In 2022, following the ministerial positions controversy, Fran Bailey revealed that Morrison showed no respect for his colleagues at Tourism Australia and he left her feeling bullied, also confirming that he "point-blank refused" to provide her or the board with any documentation or to answer questions about how the ad campaign was awarded to Saatchi.

This episode and, more generally, his career in marketing led to his satirical sobriquet, "Scotty from Marketing," originating with the satirical news website The Betoota Advocate in August 2018. It was taken up on Twitter in early 2019, and spiked at the height of the bushfire crisis on 29 December 2019. In January 2020, Morrison referred to the name as a "snarky comment" used by the Labor Party to discredit him.

== Political career ==
=== Opposition (2007–2013) ===
Morrison sought Liberal preselection for the division of Cook, an electorate in the southern suburbs of Sydney which includes Cronulla, Caringbah, and Miranda, for the 2007 election, following the retirement of Bruce Baird, who had been the member since 1998. He lost the ballot to Michael Towke, a telecommunications engineer and the candidate of the Liberals' right faction, by 82 votes to 8. Paul Fletcher who came closest to Towke received 70 votes. Fletcher went on to win Liberal preselection for the North Shore seat of Bradfield.

However, allegations surfaced that Towke had engaged in branch stacking and had embellished his resume. The state executive of the Liberal Party disendorsed Towke and held a new pre-selection ballot, which Morrison won. The allegations subsequently proved to be false, and The Daily Telegraph was forced to pay an undisclosed amount to settle a defamation suit filed by Towke. At the general election, Morrison suffered a two-party swing of over six percent against Labor candidate Mark Buttigieg, but was able to retain the seat on the strength of winning 52 percent of the primary vote. In 2022, Towke accused Morrison of engaging in "racial vilification" during the 2007 preselection, including "saying Mr Morrison told party members they should not vote for him because he was from a Lebanese family and because of rumours he was a Muslim", a claim Morrison denied.

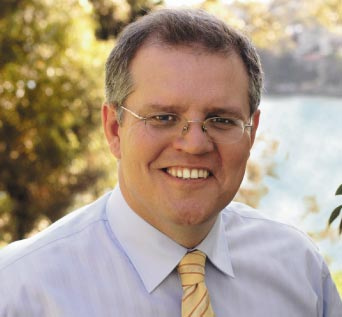
Morrison in 2009

In September 2008, Morrison was appointed to Malcolm Turnbull's coalition front bench as shadow minister for housing and local government. In December 2009, he became shadow minister for immigration and citizenship, coming into the shadow cabinet for the first time during Tony Abbott's first cabinet reshuffle shortly after winning the leadership.

In December 2010, forty-eight asylum seekers died in the Christmas Island boat disaster. In February 2011, Morrison publicly questioned the decision of the Gillard Labor government to pay for the relatives of the victims to travel to funerals in Sydney, arguing that the same privilege was not extended to Australian citizens. After fellow Liberal and shadow treasurer Joe Hockey disagreed with Morrison's statements, Morrison said that the timing of his comments was insensitive, but did not back away from the comments themselves. Other Liberal Party members including former prime minister Malcolm Fraser and former opposition leader John Hewson also criticised Morrison for his comments. In the same month, it was revealed that Morrison had "urged the shadow cabinet to capitalise on the electorate's growing concerns" about Muslims and appeal to the public perception of their "inability to integrate" to gain votes.

In February 2013, Morrison said that the police should be notified of where asylum seekers are living in the community if any antisocial behaviour has occurred, and that there should be strict guidelines for the behaviour of those currently on bridging visas while they await the determination of their claims. The new code of conduct was released by the immigration minister for more than 20,000 irregular maritime arrivals living in the community on bridging visas.

=== Abbott government (2013–2015) ===
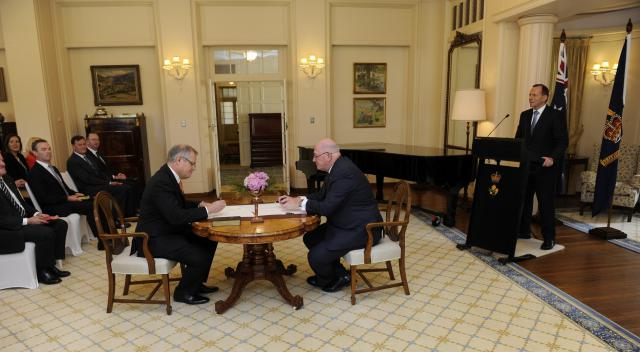
Morrison is sworn in as Minister for Social Services by Governor-General Sir Peter Cosgrove, 2014

Following the Coalition's victory at the 2013 federal election, Morrison was appointed Minister for Immigration and Border Protection in the Abbott government and included in cabinet.

Based on a series of off-the-record interviews, in June 2014 Morrison was identified by Fairfax Media as the leader of an informal grouping of "economically moderate, or wet" government MPs, also including Greg Hunt, Stuart Robert, and Josh Frydenberg. It was linked with another moderate grouping led by Christopher Pyne. It was further reported that Morrison had unsuccessfully argued in cabinet for a $25 million bailout of SPC Ardmona.

==== Immigration ====
On 18 September 2013, Morrison launched Operation Sovereign Borders, the new government's strategy aimed at stopping unauthorised boats from entering Australian waters. Cabinet documents from this time revealed in 2018 that Morrison asked for mitigation strategies to avoid granting permanent visas to 700 refugees. His office reported that there were 300 boats and 20,587 arrivals in 2013 to only 1 boat and 157 arrivals for all of 2014. The UNHCR expressed concerns that the practice may violate the Refugee Convention. In September 2014, it was reported that zero asylum seekers had died at sea since December 2013, compared with more than 1,100 deaths between 2008 and 2013. The annual refugee intake, which had been increased to 20,000 for 2012–13 by the previous government, was reduced to 13,750, the level it had been in 2011–12. Morrison stated that "Not one of those places will go to anyone who comes on a boat to Australia [...] they will go to people who have come the right way."

Morrison defended his use of the terms "illegal arrivals" and "illegal boats," saying that "I've always referred to illegal entry ... I've never claimed that it's illegal to claim asylum."

During his time as Immigration Minister, Morrison's dealings with the media and accountability to the public were widely criticised by journalists, Labor and Greens senators, and others for refusing to provide details about the matters within his portfolio. Morrison asserted that to reveal details of operations would be to play into the hands of people smugglers who used this information to plan illegal smuggling operations. On many occasions Morrison refused to answer questions about the status of asylum seekers or boats coming to and from Australia, often on the basis that he would not disclose "on water" or "operational" matters.

In November 2014, the Australian Human Rights Commission delivered a report to the government which found that Morrison failed in his responsibility to act in the best interests of children in detention during his time as minister. The overarching finding of the inquiry was that the prolonged, mandatory detention of asylum seeker children caused them significant mental and physical illness and developmental delays, in breach of Australia's international obligations. The report was criticised by Tony Abbott as being politically motivated, with regard to the timing of the report's release after the Abbott government had taken office. The government released the report publicly in February 2015.

In early December 2014, Morrison had the Migration and Maritime Powers Legislation Amendment (Resolving the Asylum Legacy Caseload) Bill 2014 passed through the Australian Parliament. The bill gave Morrison more power than any previous minister in dealing with people seeking asylum in Australia, including the power to return asylum seekers to their place of origin, detain asylum seekers without charge, and refuse asylum seekers who arrive by boat access to the Refugee Review Tribunal. The bill reintroduced temporary protection visas to deal specifically with the backlog of 30,000 people who had arrived under the previous Labor government but who had yet to be processed. The bill allowed those on bridging visas to apply for work, and increased the refugee intake to 18,750.

==== Social services ====
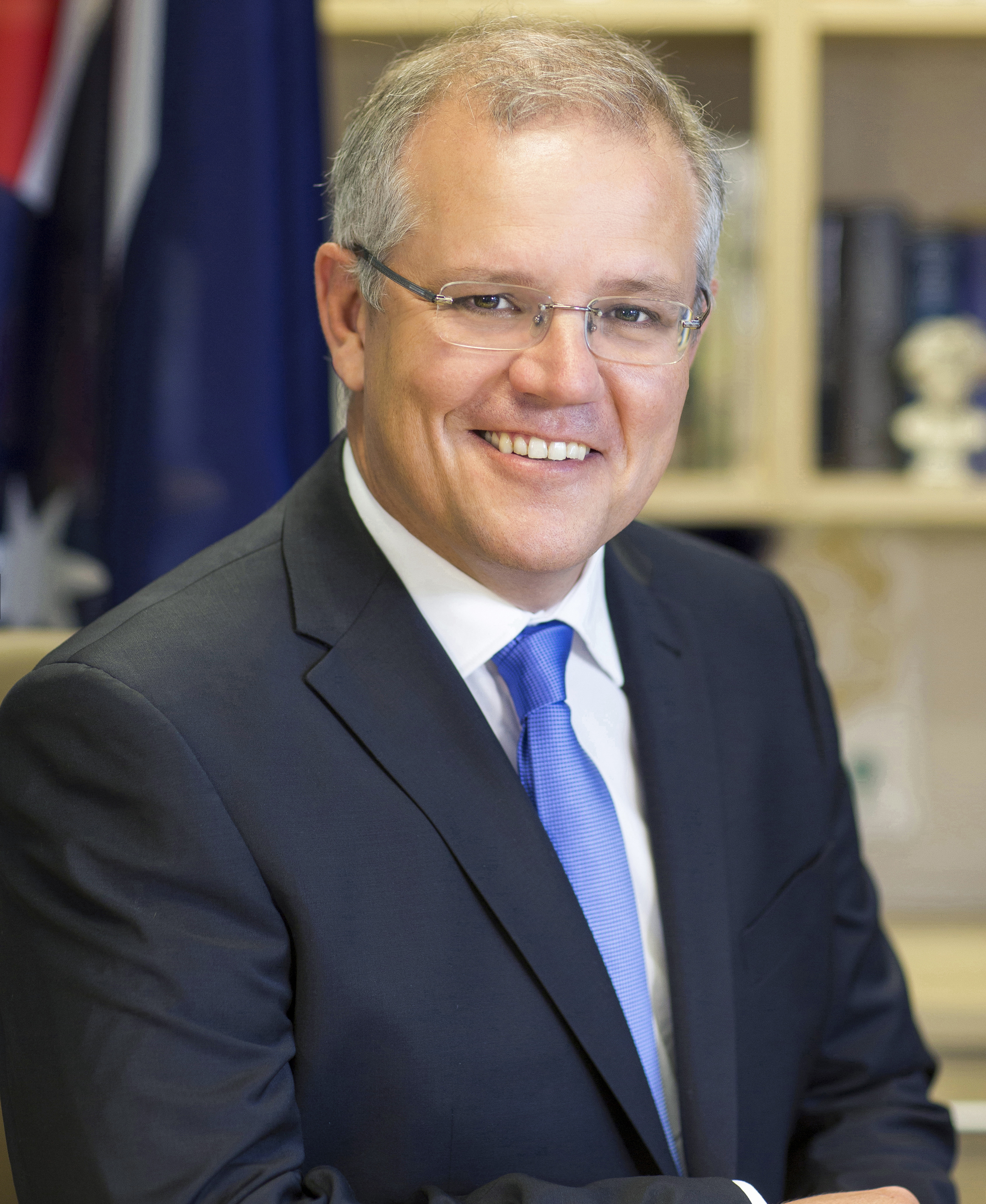
Morrison in 2014

In a cabinet reshuffle in late December 2014, Morrison was appointed the Minister for Social Services and ceased to be Minister for Immigration and Border Protection. As minister, Morrison changed indexation changes to the Family Tax Benefits payment. In April 2015, he announced the introduction of the "No Jab, No Pay" policy, which withholds family and childcare benefits from parents who do not vaccinate their children. His time as minister was criticised by his opposition counterpart Jenny Macklin, who said that "Scott Morrison was appointed to clean up Kevin Andrews' mess but left behind more chaos, confusion and cuts."

In March 2015, three hundred alumni of Sydney Boys High School signed a letter protesting Morrison's attendance at an alumni fund-raising event. The protest letter expressed the opinion that the school should not celebrate a person who has "so flagrantly disregarded human rights."

During May 2015, Morrison promoted his plan for a $3.5 billion overhaul of the childcare subsidies system. His substantial advertising efforts led to claims that he was overshadowing the role of Treasurer Joe Hockey. Morrison insisted that he did not desire to take over the position of Treasurer despite his strong performances.

Morrison was the minister who oversaw the establishment of the Robodebt scheme, which issued an estimated 526,000 incorrect automated debt notices to welfare recipients. The Royal Commission into the Robodebt Scheme later found the program to be unlawful and "cruel and crude". However, a subsequent National Anti-Corruption Commission (NACC) investigation cleared Morrison of wrongdoing.

=== Turnbull government (2015–2018) ===
Morrison was appointed as treasurer in the Turnbull government in September 2015, replacing Joe Hockey. In his first press conference as treasurer, he indicated a reduction in government expenditure and stated that the Mid-Year Economic and Fiscal Outlook (MYEFO) and White Paper on tax reform would arrive on time.

In May 2016, Morrison handed down the 2016 Australian federal budget. It included the introduction of a 40 percent diverted profits tax (popularly known as the "Google tax"), which is an anti-avoidance measure designed to prevent base erosion and profit shifting. It was passed into law as the Diverted Profits Tax Act 2017 and took effect on 1 July 2017. The new tax received criticism from some quarters, with the Corporate Tax Association stating that it would have "unpredictable outcomes" and negatively affect Australian business.

In February 2017, Morrison addressed the House of Representatives while holding a lump of coal, stating "This is coal. Don't be afraid. Don't be scared. It won't hurt you," and accusing those concerned about the environmental impact of the coal industry of having "an ideological, pathological fear of coal." He handed down the 2017 Australian federal budget in May 2017, reporting a $33.2 billion deficit.

In December 2017, the government introduced the Royal Commission into Misconduct in the Banking, Superannuation and Financial Services Industry (popularly known as the Banking Royal Commission). Morrison originally opposed the creation of a royal commission, believing that a Senate inquiry would be sufficient. He voted against a royal commission 23 times between April 2016 and June 2017, and in September 2016 described it as "nothing more than crass populism seeking to undermine confidence in the banking and financial system, which is key to jobs and growth in this country." In announcing that the royal commission would take place, Morrison described it as a "regrettable but necessary action." In response to the commission's findings, in April 2018 he announced the introduction of new criminal and civil penalties for financial misconduct, including potential prison sentences of 10 years for individuals and fines of up to $210 million for companies.

Morrison handed down the 2018 Australian federal budget on 8 May, reporting a $14.5 billion deficit. He subsequently rejected calls to increase the rate of the Newstart Allowance, saying "my priority is to give tax relief to people who are working and paying taxes."

== Prime Minister of Australia (2018–2022) ==
=== Leadership election ===
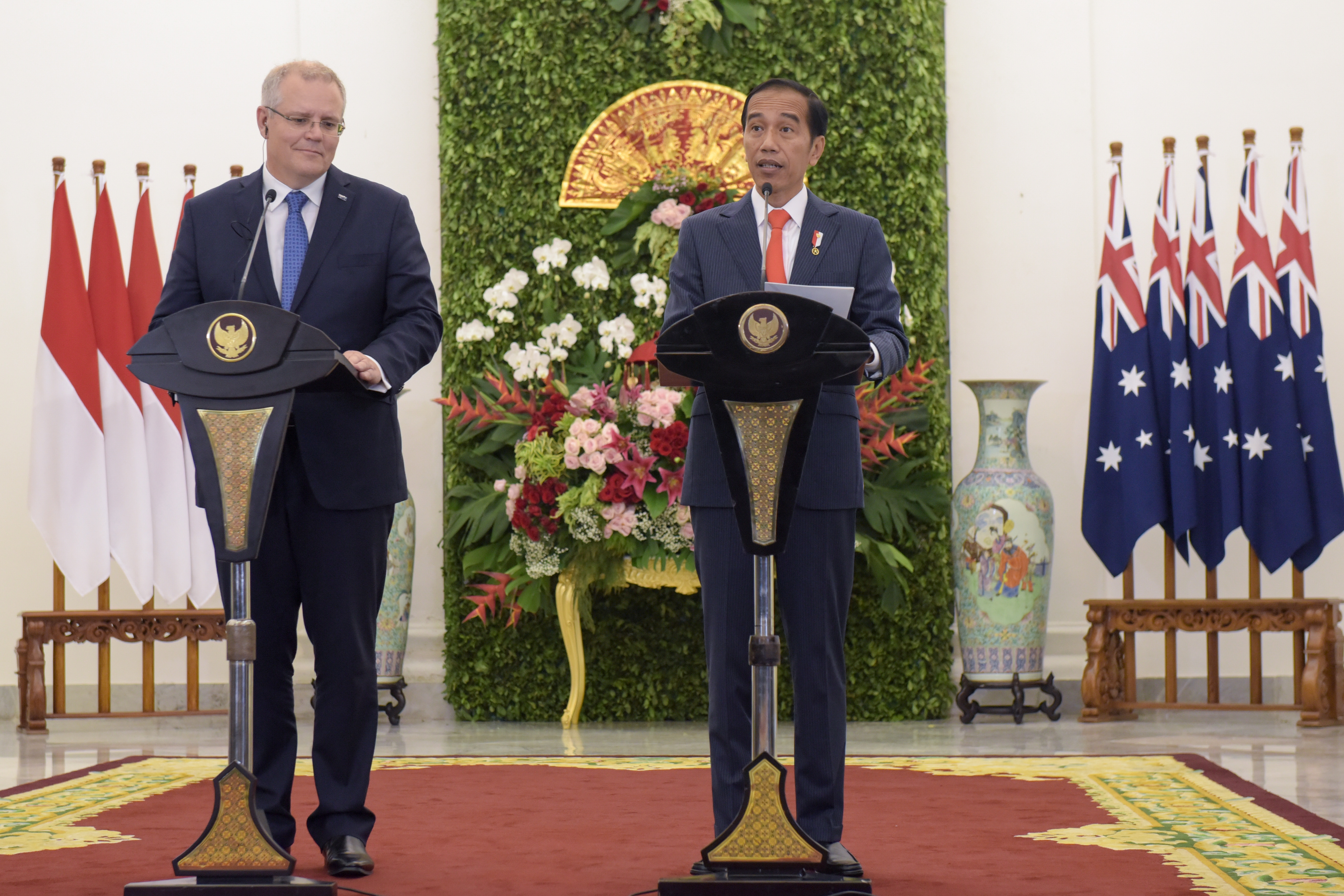
Morrison with Indonesian President Joko Widodo on his first overseas visit as prime minister

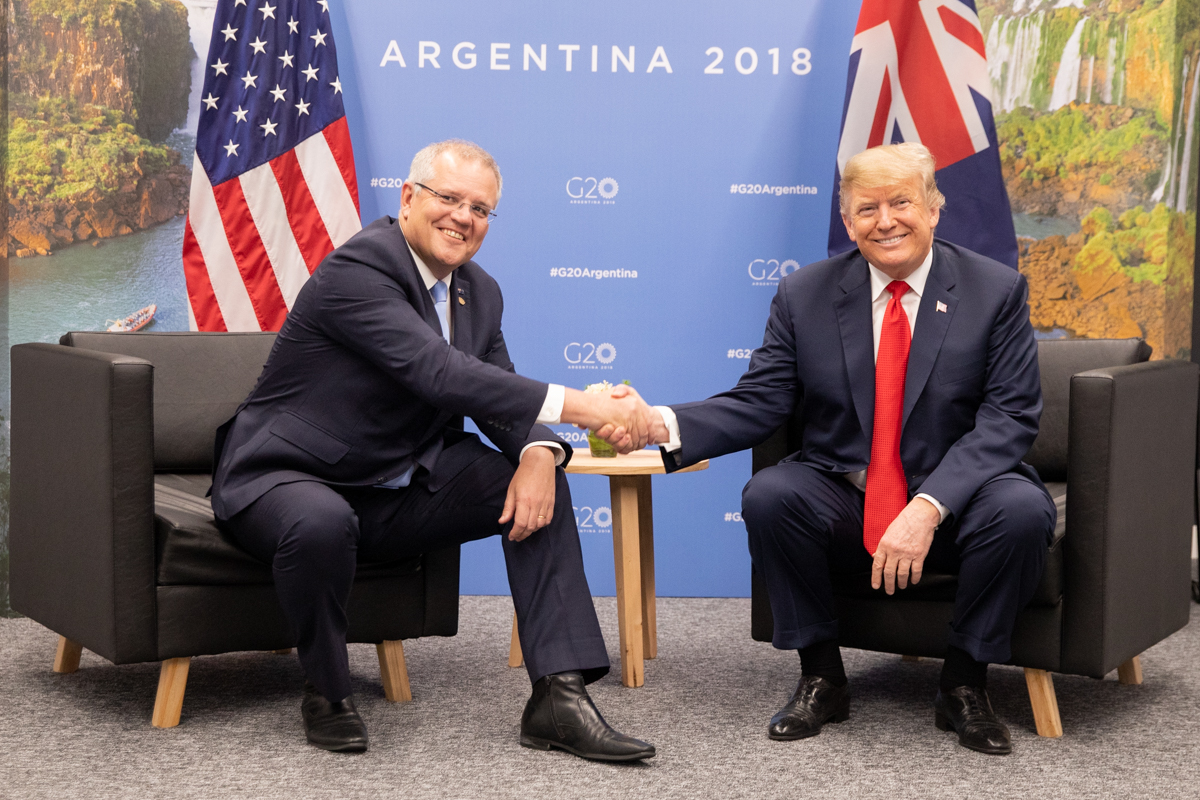
Morrison with U.S. President Donald Trump at the G20 Summit in Buenos Aires

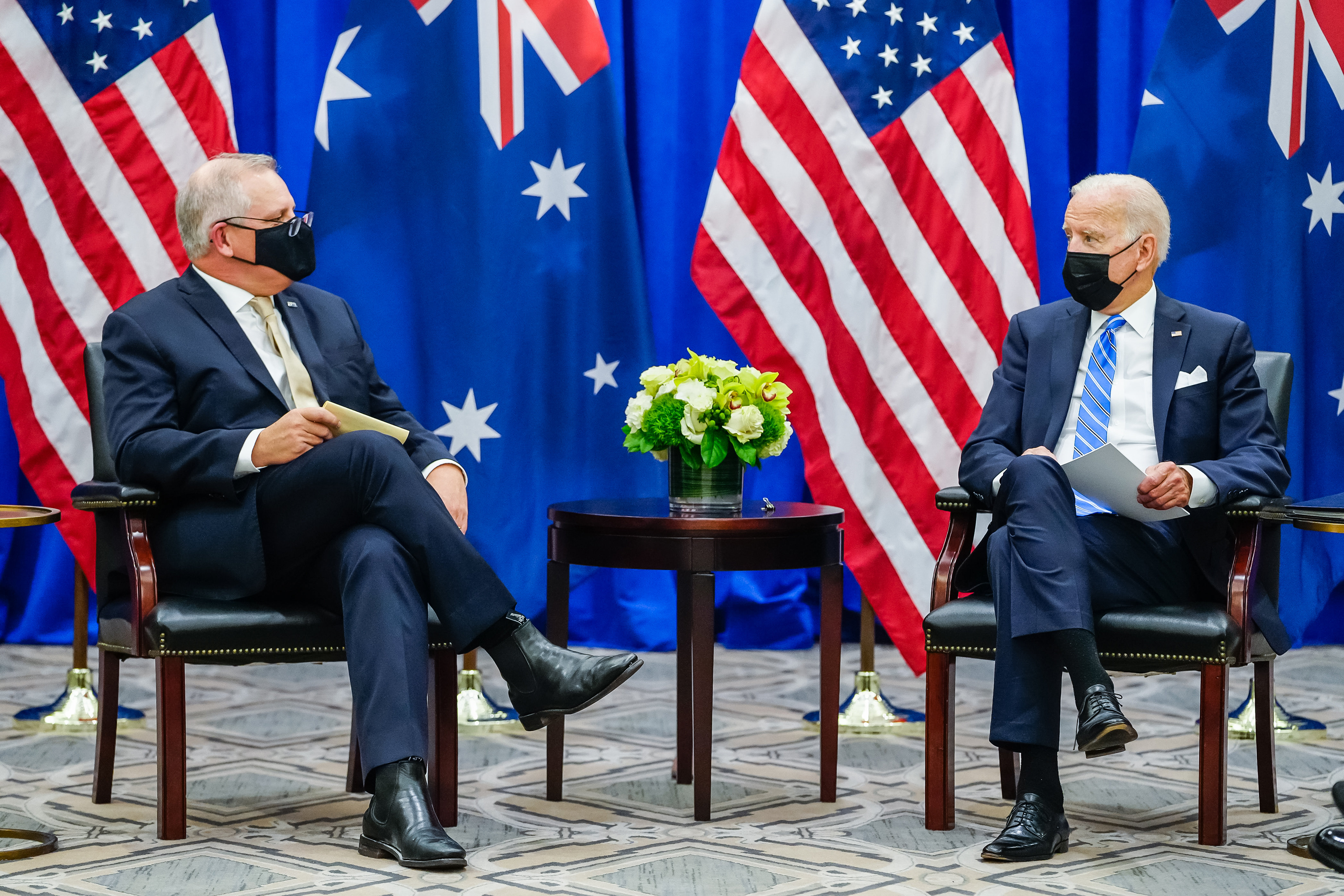
Morrison with U.S. President Joe Biden at the UN General Assembly in New York City

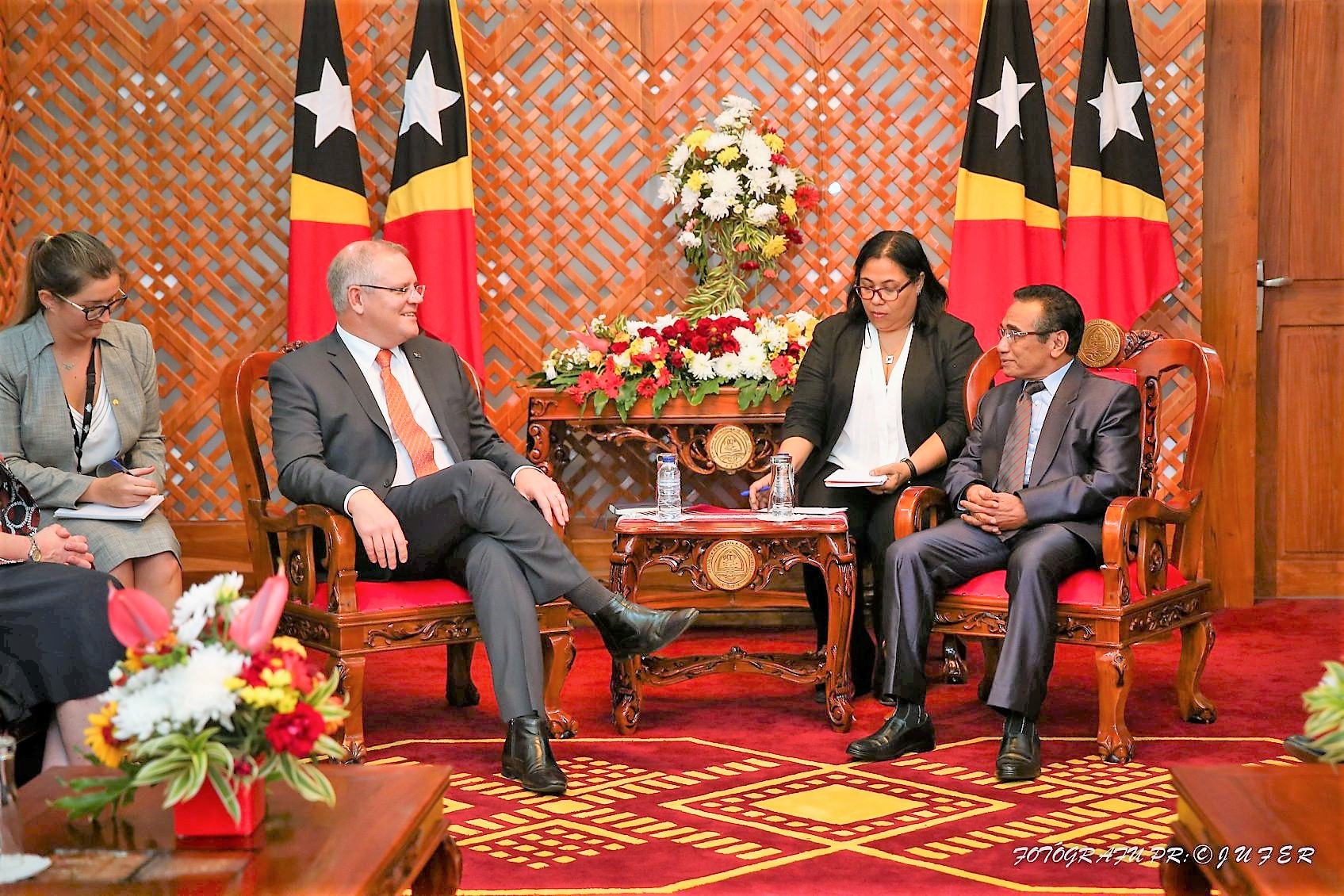
Morrison with East Timor's president Francisco Guterres

Prime Minister Malcolm Turnbull called a leadership spill on 21 August 2018 in order to gauge the confidence of the Liberal Party in his leadership. He defeated challenger Peter Dutton by 48 votes to 35. Over the following days, there was repeated speculation about a second spill being called, without Turnbull's approval. Turnbull announced two days later that he would resign the leadership if a spill motion were passed. Dutton, Morrison and Julie Bishop announced they would stand for the leadership if that were the case.

A spill motion was passed on 24 August by 45 votes to 40, and Turnbull did not run as a candidate in the resulting leadership vote. On the first ballot, Dutton received 38 votes, Morrison 36 votes, and Bishop 11 votes. On the second ballot, Morrison received 45 votes and Dutton 40 votes. He thus became leader of the Liberal Party and prime minister-designate. Josh Frydenberg was elected as the party's deputy leader, in place of Bishop. Morrison was widely seen as a compromise candidate, who was agreeable to both the moderate supporters of Turnbull and Bishop and conservatives concerned about Dutton's electability. He was sworn in as prime minister on the evening of 24 August. Upon assumption of office, Morrison would become Australia's fifth prime minister in eleven years, and the fourth prime minister in that time to enter office through a leadership spill. Several months later, Morrison introduced new criteria for leadership spills, requiring that a two-thirds majority vote from party members would be required to trigger one, in an attempt to stop "coup culture".

Soon after Morrison was sworn in, Nationals backbencher Kevin Hogan moved to the crossbench in protest of the wave of Liberal spills. Although Hogan continued to support the Coalition on confidence and supply and remained in the National party room, his departure to the crossbench and Turnbull's retirement from politics reduced the Coalition to a minority government of 74 seats. The Morrison government remained in minority after Turnbull's seat of Wentworth was lost to independent Kerryn Phelps at a by-election.

=== First term, 2018–2019 ===
Morrison made his first overseas trip as prime minister less than a week after acceding to the office. He visited the Indonesian capital of Jakarta for the Australia–Indonesia Business Forum and met with President Joko Widodo, announcing the Indonesia–Australia Comprehensive Economic Partnership Agreement that had been negotiated under the preceding Turnbull government.

In October 2018, Morrison announced Australia was reviewing whether to move Australia's embassy in Israel from Tel Aviv to Jerusalem, and recognising Jerusalem as the capital of Israel. In December 2018, Morrison announced Australia has recognised West Jerusalem as the capital of Israel but will not immediately move its embassy from Tel Aviv.

In November 2018, Morrison privately raised the issue of Xinjiang re-education camps and human rights abuses against the Uyghurs in a meeting with Chinese Premier Li Keqiang in Singapore.

In March 2019, Morrison condemned the Christchurch mosque shootings as an "extremist, right-wing violent terrorist attack". He also stated that Australians and New Zealanders were family and that the Australian authorities would be cooperating with New Zealand authorities to assist with the investigation. Morrison condemned "reckless" and "highly offensive" comments made by Turkey's President Recep Tayyip Erdoğan. Erdoğan repeatedly showed video taken by the Christchurch mosque shooter to his supporters at campaign rallies for upcoming local elections and said Australians and New Zealanders who came to Turkey with anti-Muslim sentiments "would be sent back in coffins like their grandfathers were" during the Gallipoli Campaign of World War I.

=== 2019 federal election ===
Morrison led the Coalition into the 2019 election. At time of the writs being issued, the Coalition had been behind the Labor Party in most opinion polls for previous term of parliament, leading to widespread expectations that the Coalition would lose. However, in a significant upset, the Coalition retained its majority. This was considered to have been caused by the unpopularity of opposition leader Bill Shorten and Labor's failure to adapt to the re-framing of the election as a choice between Morrison and Shorten. Claiming victory on election night, Morrison stated that he had "always believed in miracles".

=== Second term, 2019–2022 ===
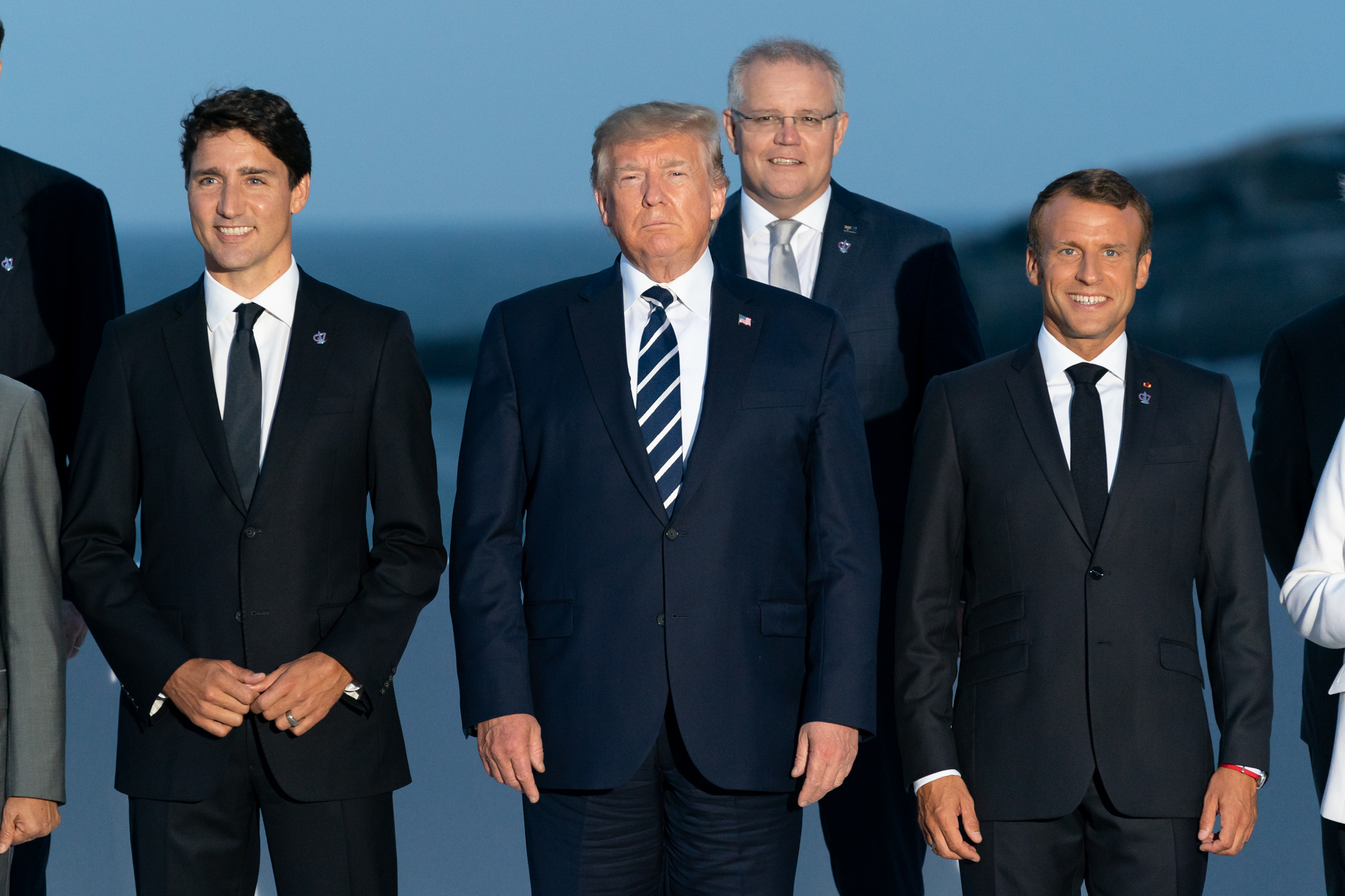
Morrison at 45th G7 summit in Biarritz, France

==== Domestic affairs ====
===== Bushfires =====
In December 2019, Morrison faced criticism for taking an unannounced overseas holiday with his family to Hawaii, United States during the 2019–20 Australian bushfire season. Morrison's office initially declined to comment on the length of his trip and his whereabouts, citing security concerns, and made false claims that Morrison was not in Hawaii. After increasing criticism from opposition politicians and on social media regarding the holiday, Morrison released a statement on 20 December that stated he "deeply regret[ted] any offence caused" and that he would cut his holiday short to return to Australia on 21 December.

On 22 November 2021, Leader of the Opposition Anthony Albanese accused Morrison of falsely claiming in Parliament that he had informed him that he was travelling to Hawaii.

===== Response to parliamentary sexual misconduct allegations =====
The Morrison government was widely criticised for its handling of the 2021 Australian Parliament House sexual misconduct allegations, with an Essential poll finding that 65% of respondents (including 76% of Labor supporters, 51% of Coalition supporters and 88% of Greens supporters) saying the government was more interested in protecting itself than women. As well as the Labor and Greens parties, the government faced criticism from within its own party. Former prime minister Malcolm Turnbull, who had been made aware of the allegations against Christian Porter in 2019, criticised him for taking too long to come forward. Former prime minister John Howard defended Morrison's decision not to open an independent inquiry into Porter's conduct. Australian of the Year and sexual assault survivor advocate Grace Tame also criticised Morrison in a speech to the National Press Club, saying she did not believe he was creating an environment where victims were believed. She also said "It shouldn't take having children to have a conscience" in response to Morrison's statement that he'd been prompted to reflect on the issue and decide to listen to Tame after a discussion with his wife Jenny Morrison where she said to him "you have to think about this as a father. What would you want to happen if it were our girls?" Porter resigned from his parliamentary position in September following concerns that he had accepted anonymous donations via a blind trust to pay for his legal expenses. The following month, Morrison and the Coalition successfully voted against a motion to investigate Porter's blind trust, in turn preventing the identities of the benefactors who donated to his legal costs from being revealed. The Speaker of the House of Representatives, Tony Smith, had determined that there was a prima facie case and, in voting down the motion, the Morrison government became the first government since Federation to refuse a referral from the Speaker. This decision attracted significant attention and criticism from the media.

===== Afghan refugees =====
Morrison was also criticised by Gay Alcorn of The Age for not accepting more Afghan refugees, who were fleeing the country after the Taliban seized control of the country in August 2021. He agreed to give humanitarian visas to 3,000 Afghan refugees, fewer than other countries such as the United States and the United Kingdom. Morrison later determined that more than 3,000 refugees may be accepted, as the original number was a "floor not a ceiling". He would later state that he would only resettle refugees who came in through "official channels", and those who came to Australia via boat would not receive permanent residency.

===== Advance Australia Fair =====
in December 2020, Morrison announced that he would be advising the governor-general to proclaim a change to Advance Australia Fair, changing one word in the opening couplet, from "we are young and free" to "we are one and free", to take effect on 1 January 2021. Premier of New South Wales Gladys Berejiklian raised the proposal.

===== Eastern Australia floods =====
Morrison was heavily condemned for his government's response to the 2022 eastern Australia floods; criticism was levelled against him for campaigning in Perth instead of being present in New South Wales, causing a relief package for flood victims to be delayed, with many critics suggesting that Morrison was prioritising marketing over the flood response.

===== Joint ministerial positions =====
On 15 August 2022, Prime Minister Anthony Albanese announced an investigation by his office into claims that Morrison secretly appointed himself to administer several government departments during the COVID-19 pandemic. The health minister at the time, Greg Hunt, was understood to have agreed to Morrison's position administering the health department; however, the finance minister, Mathias Cormann, was unaware that Morrison had appointed himself in a joint ministerial position. The resources minister, Keith Pitt, was aware of Morrison's self-appointment to the resources portfolio "sometime in 2021". David Littleproud, who was the agriculture minister in Morrison's government, criticised the self-appointments as "pretty ordinary (Note: In Australian English, "ordinary" can mean bad or undesirable.)".

Later that day, the Governor-General's office confirmed that Morrison had been appointed to a number of ministerial offices, without stating which. As a change in the responsibilities of an existing minister, this had not required further swearing in but had been done by an administrative instrument; announcement of the appointments had been a matter for the government. (Note: The statement says that the appointments were made "consistently with" Constitution section 64. Section 64 provides for appointment of "Ministers of State" to "administer such departments of State of the Commonwealth as the Governor-General in Council may establish". The Governor-General does this formally on the advice of the Executive Council and in effect on that of the prime minister.) Constitutional law professor Anne Twomey, however, could not trace such instruments and called the process "just bizarre". Prime Minister Anthony Albanese ordered a search for them and is seeking legal advice from the solicitor-general. Leading members of the Morrison cabinet, not only Mathias Cormann but also Peter Dutton (then defence minister), have said that they had not been aware of these appointments. Morrison initially declined to comment but later phoned 2GB to say that these three appointments—there might have been more, but he was unsure—had been "extraordinary measures" as "safeguards" during the Covid pandemic. He had got himself appointed as joint resources minister in order to be able to overrule a decision on gas exploration by the resources minister.

The following day, 16 August, Albanese held a second press conference, confirming that Morrison was appointed to administer five departments in addition to his role administering the Department of Prime Minister and Cabinet. Morrison was appointed to administer the Department of Health on 14 March 2020; the Department of Finance on 30 March 2020; the Department of Home Affairs on 6 May 2021, the Department of the Treasury on 6 May 2021, and the Department of Industry, Science, Energy and Resources on 15 April 2021. Documents relating to these appointments were released by the Department of the Prime Minister and Cabinet on 17 August.

Albanese asked the Solicitor-General for an opinion on the validity of the appointment to the resources ministry. The report, released on 23 August, advised that this appointment had been lawful, but that its secrecy "fundamentally undermined" the principles of responsible government.

Anthony Albanese announced an inquiry into Scott Morrison's ministerial positions, to be headed by former High Court Justice Virginia Bell. On 25 November 2022, Bell reported that Morrison's appointment to multiple ministerial positions was "corrosive" to trust in government. She recommended legislation to ensure all ministerial appointments were made public.

On 30 November 2022, the House of Representatives voted 86–50 for a government motion to censure Morrison for failing to disclose to the parliament and the public his secret appointments to a number of ministries. All non-Coalition votes were in favour, as well as that of Liberal MP Bridget Archer; all Coalition votes were against, as well as that of Bob Katter.

===== Tribunal appointments =====
Two former senior judges have reported to the Commonwealth Attorney-General that, shortly before the 2022 Australian federal election was called, the Morrison government got an unusual number of people with political connections to the Coalition appointed to highly paid positions on the Administrative Appeals Tribunal. Each was appointed by the Governor-General through an administrative instrument, but the appointment was not gazetted, although there was at least one media release. In some cases, the appointee was already a member of the AAT whose term still had some time to run. In no case did the new appointment carry a specified term of office. The two former judges question whether these appointments were validly made and whether, if they were not valid, that would affect the validity of decisions that these appointees have made.

===== Australian Future Leaders Foundation =====
The Australian Future Leaders Foundation, a leadership education programme proposed by Governor-General David Hurley, was formally established in 2021. The Morrison government allocated it $18 million in funding over five years, with no formal process of approval. The Senate Standing Committee for the Scrutiny of Delegated Legislation was seeking further information and no public money had yet been paid, although Hurley had hosted fundraising events at Government House, when the Albanese government cancelled the grant.

==== Foreign affairs ====
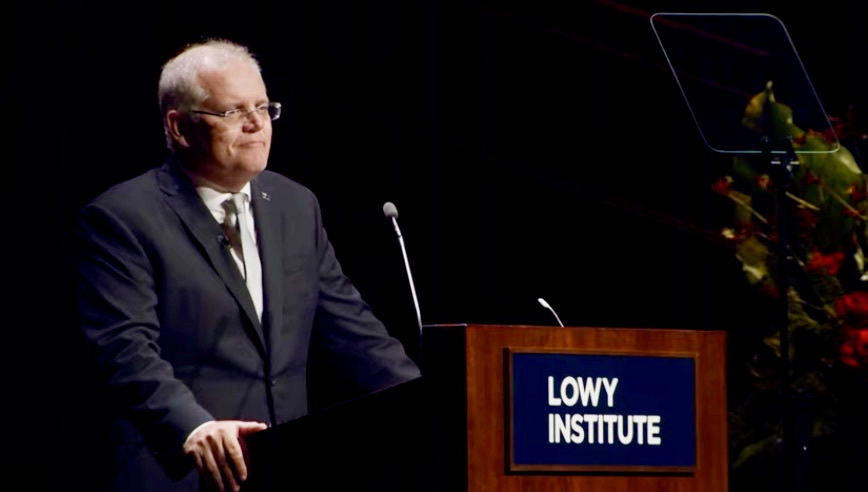
At the 2019 Lowy Lecture, Scott Morrison argued that the "distinctiveness of independent nations is preserved within a framework of mutual respect".

===== 2019 Hong Kong protests =====
In August 2019, Morrison called on the Chief Executive of Hong Kong, Carrie Lam, to listen to protester demands, denying that the 2019–2020 Hong Kong protests were showing signs of terrorism.

===== 2019 Turkish offensive =====
In October 2019, Morrison criticised the 2019 Turkish offensive into north-eastern Syria. Morrison stated that he was concerned for the safety of the Kurds living in the region and also feared that the offensive could result in a resurgence of ISIS.

===== Sino–Australian relations =====
On 30 November 2020, a Chinese diplomat, Zhao Lijian, posted on his Twitter page a digitally manipulated image of an Australian soldier who appeared to hold a bloodied knife against the throat of an Afghan child. The image is believed to be a reference to the Brereton Report, which had been released earlier by the Australian government that month, and which details war crimes committed by the Australian Defence Force during the War in Afghanistan between 2005 and 2016. Later that day, Morrison called a press conference, calling the image "offensive" and "truly repugnant", and demanding a formal apology from the Chinese government. China rejected the demands for an apology on the following day, with the artist of the image creating another artwork To Morrison in response to Morrison's demand. The incident had the effect of unifying Australian politicians in condemning China across party lines while also drawing attention to the Brereton Report. The incident was further seen as a sign of deteriorating relations between Australia and China.

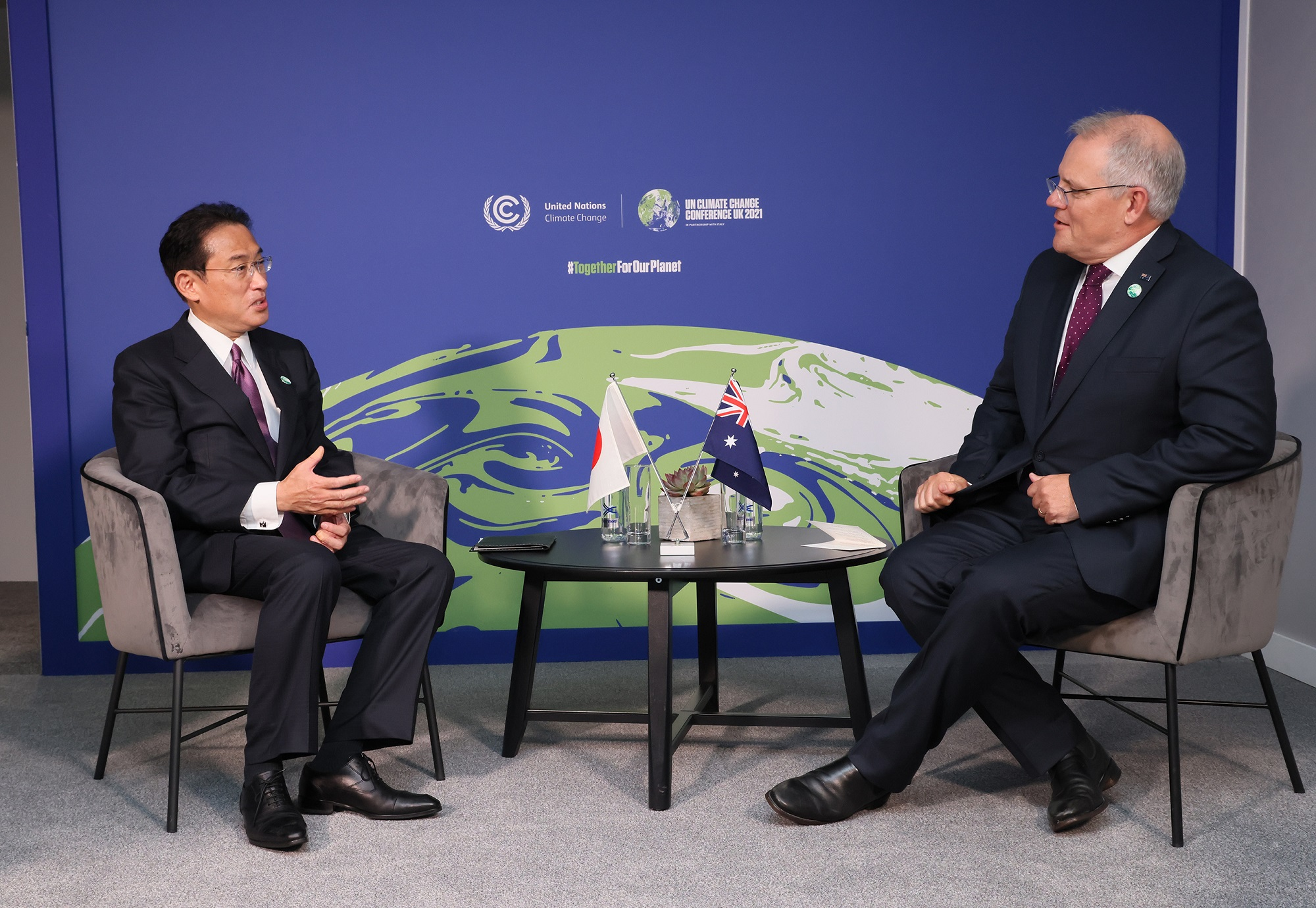
Morrison and Japanese Prime Minister Fumio Kishida at the COP26 climate summit in Glasgow on 2 November 2021

===== Relations with New Zealand =====
As prime minister, Morrison has defended Australia's policy of deporting non-citizens including New Zealanders who had violated its character test or committed crimes. This policy was criticised by his New Zealand counterpart Jacinda Ardern, who described it as "corrosive" to Australia–New Zealand relations in February 2020.

In mid-February 2021, Morrison defended the Australian policy of revoking Australian citizenship for dual nationals engaged in terrorism. The previous year, the Australian government had revoked the citizenship of dual Australian–New Zealand citizen Suhayra Aden, who had become an ISIS bride. New Zealand Prime Minister Ardern had criticised the decision, accusing Australia of abandoning its citizens. Following a phone conversation, the two leaders agreed to work together in the "spirit of the Australian-New Zealand relationship" to address what Ardern described as "quite a complex legal situation."

In late May 2021, Morrison made his first state visit to New Zealand since the COVID-19 lockdown, meeting New Zealand prime minister Ardern in Queenstown. The two heads of governments issued a joint statement affirming bilateral cooperation on the issues of COVID-19, bilateral relations, and security issues in the Indo-Pacific. Morrison and Ardern also raised concerns about the South China Sea dispute and human rights in Hong Kong and Xinjiang. In response to the joint statement, Chinese Foreign Ministry spokesperson Wang Wenbin criticised the Australian and New Zealand governments for interfering in Chinese domestic affairs. During the visit, Morrison defended Australia's decision to revoke ISIS bride Suhayra Aden's citizenship but indicated that the Australian Government would consider allowing her children to settle in Australia.

===== 2022 Russian invasion of Ukraine =====
In February 2022, Morrison condemned Russian President Vladimir Putin for launching the 2022 Russian invasion of Ukraine and imposed sanctions on travel bans on individuals perceived to be supporting the invasion. Morrison said Australia would begin sending lethal aid to the Ukrainian government. The Australian government moved to join with the United Kingdom, Canada, and the United States in personally sanctioning Putin and Sergey Lavrov, the foreign minister.

===== AUKUS =====
In September 2021, Morrison, British premier Boris Johnson and US President Joe Biden announced AUKUS, a security pact between Australia, the United Kingdom and the United States seen as an initiative to counter the perceived dominance of China in the Pacific. This superseded a proposed submarine pact between Australia and France that had been in discussions at the same time; the announcement of AUKUS attracted backlash from French officials and damaged Australia–France relations. Chinese officials also criticised the agreement. French President Emmanuel Macron reportedly remarked privately to Morrison that the dissolution of the agreement had "broke the relationship of trust" between the two countries, and publicly accused him of lying during the 2021 United Nations Climate Change Conference, which was seen as damaging to Morrison's public image.

==== COVID-19 pandemic ====
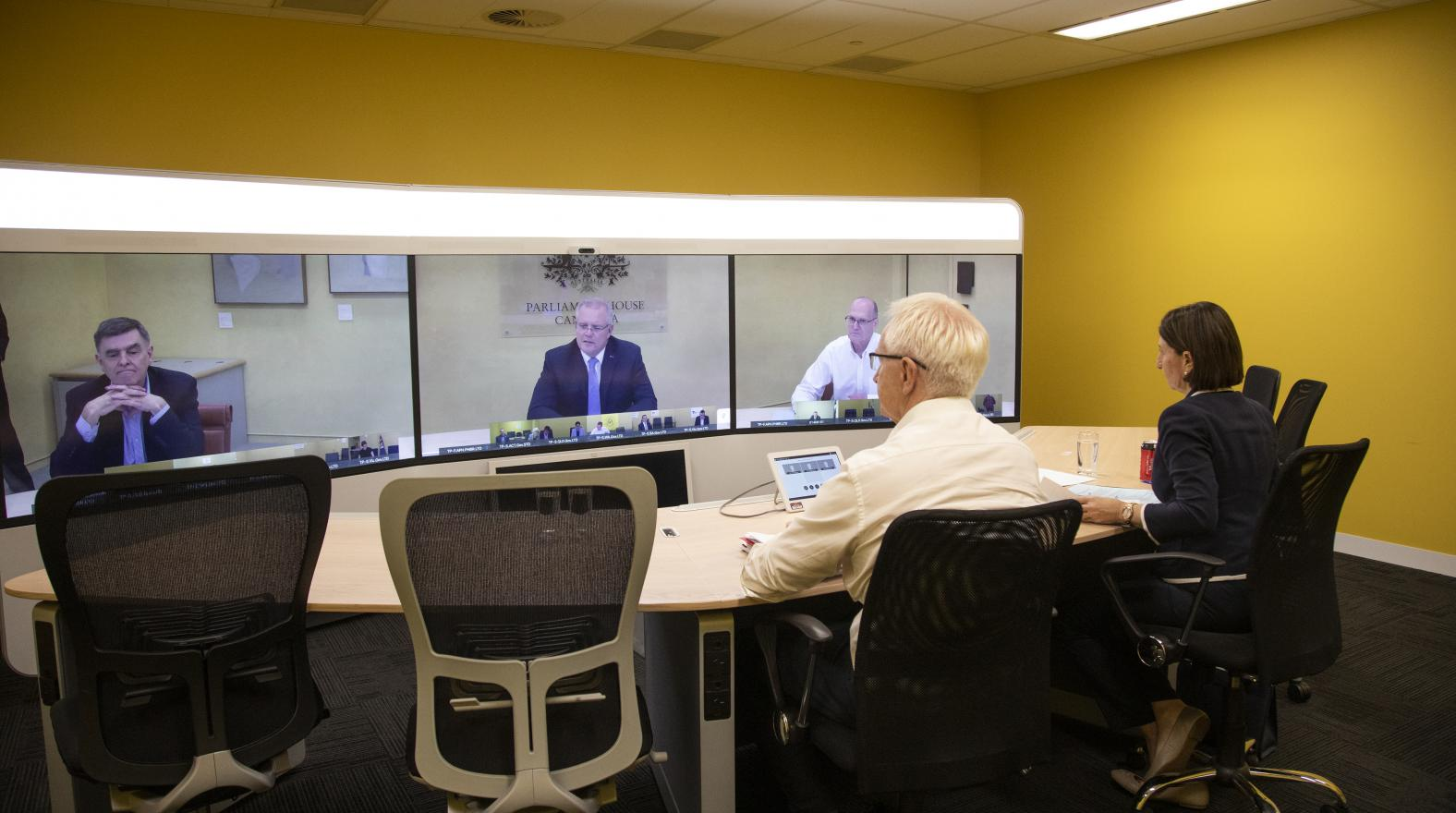
Morrison at a National Cabinet meeting

The COVID-19 pandemic in Australia prompted Morrison to establish the National Cabinet on 13 March 2020. This body is composed of the prime minister and the premiers and chief ministers of the states and territories to coordinate the national response to the pandemic. On 29 May 2020, the Prime Minister announced that the National Cabinet would replace the Council of Australian Governments (COAG) and meetings after the pandemic would be held monthly, instead of the biannual meetings of COAG.

"The world over - we have all faced the health and economic crises generated by the COVID-19 pandemic. 2020 is a year none of us want to repeat. In Australia, we have used our strong balance sheet - built up over many years of discipline, to support and provide our health system with the additional resources, record levels, it has needed - and to provide major, unprecedented economic supports for households and businesses - providing much needed strength and resilience to the economy to both cushion the blow and to recover...... As the world's only nation continent, we always have to be outward looking. You don't get rich by selling stuff to yourself. Singaporeans certainly understand that."

— Morrison speaking about the impacts of the COVID-19 pandemic on Australia at the Singapore FinTech Festival, December 2020

On 5 May, Morrison, New Zealand prime minister Jacinda Ardern and Australian state and territorial leaders agreed to work together to develop a Trans-Tasman travel zone that would allow residents from both countries to travel freely between them without restrictions. Morrison supported an international inquiry into the origins of the global COVID-19 pandemic and opined that the coronavirus most likely originated in a wildlife wet market in Wuhan.

On 2 March 2022, Morrison announced he had contracted COVID and was suffering from flu-like symptoms.

===== Vaccine rollout =====
In August 2020, Morrison announced that Australians would be "among the first in the world to receive a COVID-19 vaccine, if it proves successful, through an agreement between the Australian government and UK-based drug company AstraZeneca". In November 2020, he said the government's COVID-19 strategy would put "Australia at the front of the queue for a safe and effective vaccine".

During a press conference on 7 January 2021, Morrison announced that Australia's vaccination program would begin in February of that year, also stating that the government planned to vaccinate four million people by the end of March. However, this figure was not met, as only 600,000 doses were administered by 31 March, 3.4 million less than the target.

Both the original goal for vaccine doses and vaccine priority cohorts were revised several times. By 30 June 2021 the number of doses given (7.6 million) was 4.7 million less than the goal for the end of June.

The slow vaccine rollout prompted traditionally conservative newspaper The Australian to editorialise that "the federal government is losing credibility with its management of the vaccine rollout and its repeated claims that everything is on track". Former ALP staffer Tim Soutphommasane and progressive activist Marc Stears criticised the government's management of the vaccine rollout in June 2021, saying it will likely be "taught as a case study of public policy failure". During a press conference in July, Morrison issued an apology for the slow vaccine rollout. In August, Morrison declared that the government's problems with the rollout had been "overcome", despite several states having a shortage of vaccines. To describe Australia's prolonged vaccination rollout, trade unionist Sally McManus coined the term "strollout", with the phrase being named as the country's word of the year by Macquarie Dictionary.

=== 2022 federal election ===
Morrison sought a second full term at the 2022 Australian federal election. His primary opposition was the Labor Party, led by Anthony Albanese. The Coalition suffered heavy losses, and it soon became apparent that there was no realistic scenario for Morrison to stay in office. Hours after the polls closed, he conceded defeat to Albanese. The Coalition's loss was attributed to Morrison's unpopularity with voters, the popularity of centrist "teal independents" in certain inner-city electorates, and a large swing toward Labor in Western Australia. After conceding defeat, Morrison announced that he would step down as leader of the Liberal Party. Soon afterward, he advised the Governor-General, David Hurley, that he was no longer in a position to govern.

Normal practice in Australia calls for a defeated prime minister to stay in office as a caretaker until the final results are known. However, the timetable was altered due to the Quadrilateral Security Dialogue due to begin on 24 May, two days after the election. On 23 May, after securing enough confidence and supply support from the crossbench to govern in the event Labor fell short of a majority, Albanese advised Hurley that he could form a government, clearing the way for Morrison to transfer power to Albanese later that day.

==== Asylum seeker boat controversy ====
On election day, 21 May 2022, a Suspected Illegal Entry Vessel was intercepted as a part of Joint Agency Task Force (JATF), Operation Sovereign Borders. The Prime Minister's Office then asked the Commander of the JATF to publish a statement about the interception. The incoming Labor government ordered a departmental inquiry, which found that officials had been pressured by the immigration minister, apparently urged by Morrison, to make a quick announcement with release to selected journalists as well as social media, but had refused do so; although, at the minister's insistence, basic factual information was given limited release in time for a press conference by the prime minister.

== Post-prime ministerial career ==
Soon after the 2022 election, on 30 May, Peter Dutton was elected as the new leader of the Liberal Party in a leadership election, with Dutton later stating that Morrison would not be included in his shadow ministry. Morrison remained in Parliament as a backbencher until his resignation in February 2024. In May 2023, he took an advisory position with the U.S. based think tank the Center for a New American Security.

In December 2022, Morrison gave evidence to the Royal Commission into the Robodebt Scheme, concerning his role in the implementation of the unlawful scheme, which was piloted during his time as Social Services minister. The commission handed down its final report in July 2023, with Morrison being criticised for misleading Cabinet and failing his ministerial duties. The commission also found that Morrison gave false evidence to the commission. In March 2026, the National Anti-Corruption Commission (NACC) published its Operation Myrtleford investigation report into six individuals referred by the Royal Commission. The NACC found that Morrison did not engage in corrupt conduct, concluding that his failure to identify misleading departmental advice was attributable to shortcomings within the federal departments rather than a breach of his personal obligations. Morrison stated that the NACC findings vindicated his position and rejected the conclusions of the Royal Commission regarding his conduct. The NACC's conclusions diverged from the Royal Commission's findings in several key respects.

On 24 July 2025, Scott Morrison testified before the United States House Select Committee on the Chinese Communist Party, where he stated that China had targeted Australia with economic coercion in an attempt to punish it for its alliance with the United States. Morrison described a range of punitive trade measures imposed by Beijing during his prime ministership, including tariffs and import bans, as politically motivated responses to Australia's calls for an investigation into the origins of COVID-19 and its broader strategic posture. He asserted that Australia had shown resilience by standing firm rather than yielding to pressure and emphasized that the AUKUS defense pact, which he helped establish, was a key element of Australia's response to growing regional threats. Morrison also warned against complacency in recognizing the long-term strategic challenge posed by China and criticized the Albanese government's approach to defense spending and engagement with Beijing.

=== Secret ministerial appointments controversy ===
In August 2022, Morrison was involved in a political scandal when reports emerged that he had secretly advised Governor-General Hurley to appoint him as joint minister for Health, Finance, and Resources between March 2020 and May 2021. In a press conference on 15 August, Albanese announced an investigation into the reports, saying that the people were "kept in the dark" about these developments in a manner that was "unacceptable" and "very contrary to our Westminster system". The following day, Albanese revealed that Morrison had himself appointed as joint Treasurer and joint minister for Home Affairs in addition to the other three portfolios.

An opinion from the Solicitor-General, Stephen Donaghue, found that while the appointments may have been lawful and that Hurley was bound by convention to make them, their secrecy "fundamentally undermined" the principles of responsible government. Morrison maintained that "the serious crises facing Australia" demanded that he take on the joint ministries as a "safeguard". An inquiry by former High Court Justice Virginia Bell concluded the appointments were "corrosive" to trust in government, and had little connection to pandemic issues. Bell recommended legislation requiring that all ministerial appointments be made public.

On 28 November, the House voted to censure Morrison for the appointments, the first time a former prime minister had been censured. The vote was mostly along party lines, with Bridget Archer being the only Coalition MP to vote in favour of the motion.

=== Private sector career ===
On 23 January 2024, Morrison announced his resignation from Parliament. He formally resigned on 28 February 2024 and was succeeded by Simon Kennedy, who won the 2024 Cook by-election on 13 April. Morrison took a job with consulting firm American Global Strategies, founded by Robert C. O'Brien, who served as National Security Advisor under then-U.S. President Donald Trump, as a non-executive vice chairman. In May 2024, Morrison published an autobiography, Plans For Your Good: A Prime Minister's Testimony of God's Faithfulness.

== Political views ==
Morrison's political views are considered as conservative, and he is aligned with the centre-right faction of the Liberal Party, which he led while in government.

=== Social policies ===
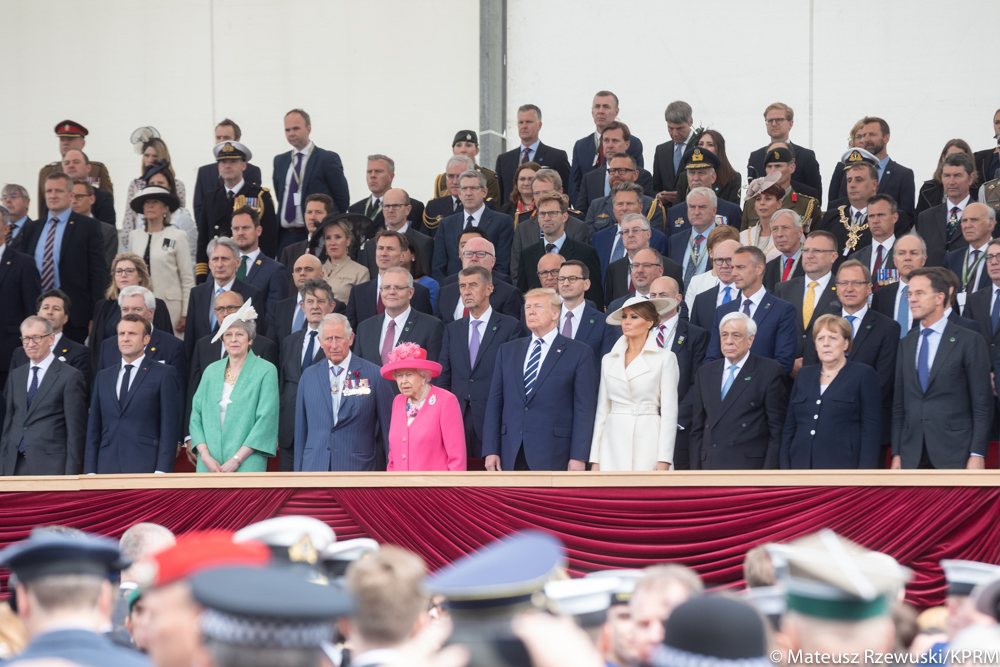
Morrison with Queen Elizabeth II, Head of the Commonwealth, and other world leaders in Portsmouth, 2019

Morrison has declared himself a proud supporter of the Australian constitutional monarchy. In January 2021, he commented that he opposes changing the date of Australia Day from 26 January, which attracted criticism.

Morrison strongly opposes voluntary euthanasia and assisted suicide, and has stated that he "believes in the sanctity of human life".

Morrison's views on immigration have been the subject of media attention, with The Straits Times describing his stance as "hardline" and "uncompromising". As Minister for Immigration and Border Protection, he was responsible for implementing Operation Sovereign Borders, which requires all asylum seekers arriving in Australia via boat to be refused entry and escorted back to the county they came from. In May 2021, the Morrison government passed laws which would allow refugees to be detained for life in Australia's immigration detention facilities, despite indefinite detention being illegal under international law.

Morrison was an opponent of legalising same-sex marriage in Australia. After the Australian Marriage Law Postal Survey, he proposed an amendment to the Marriage Amendment (Definition and Religious Freedoms) Bill 2017 allowing parents to remove children from classes if "non-traditional" marriage is discussed. All amendments failed, and Morrison abstained from voting on the final bill. Morrison's electorate of Cook had a participation rate of 82.22% in the Marriage Law Postal Survey, and 55.04% of those had responded "Yes." By November 2017, Morrison considered the topic to be a "done deal" and a "finished debate", and same-sex marriage ultimately came into law on 9 December of that year.

Morrison has indicated support for excluding transgender women from playing "single-sex sports".

=== Environmental policies ===
This is coal. Don't be afraid. Don't be scared. It won't hurt you.

It's coal. It was dug up by men and women who work and live in the electorates of those who sit opposite—from the Hunter Valley, as the member for Hunter would know. It's coal that's ensured for over 100 years that Australia has enjoyed an energy-competitive advantage that has delivered prosperity to Australian businesses and has ensured that Australian industry has been able to remain competitive in a global market.

Those opposite have an ideological, pathological fear of coal. There's no word for 'coalophobia' officially, but that's the malady that afflicts those opposite. It's that malady that's affecting the jobs in the towns and the industries and, indeed, in this country because of the pathological, ideological opposition to coal being an important part of our sustainable and more certain energy future.

— Scott Morrison, (House of Representatives, 9 February 2017)

Morrison's policies and views on climate change have been a subject of interest. Morrison, along with the rest of the Coalition, voted to abolish Australia's carbon pricing scheme in July 2014. Morrison also famously presented a lump of coal to Parliament during question time in February 2017. During his term as prime minister, the 2020 Climate Change Performance Index ranked Australia in last place for its climate policies and was the only country to score 0 for the same metric in 2021. During the 2019–20 Australian bushfire season, Morrison dismissed suggestions of a link between Australia's emissions or policies and the intensity of the bushfires and initially downplayed the influence of climate change on the fires, but later admitted that climate change may have contributed. Protests over his government's climate policies took place across Australia amidst the fire season.

Following his attendance of the 2021 Leaders' Climate Summit, Morrison declined to set net-zero emissions or other climate change targets, unlike other world leaders. Morrison allegedly requested climate change policy targets be removed from a proposed 2021 Australia–United Kingdom trade deal and initially suggested he would not attend the 2021 United Nations Climate Change Conference, but later confirmed that he would. Following the conference, Morrison's government pledged that Australia would aim to achieve net zero emissions by 2050, but did not introduce this into national law; Morrison said he believed market forces rather than government regulation could address climate change.

His government's climate action plan was criticised by journalist Phil Coorey as "lightweight", and by a Climate Council spokesman as "meaningless without strong action this decade".

=== Security ===
Morrison has frequently highlighted strategic risks posed by China, stating in 2020 that tensions in Asia reminded him of Europe in the 1930s and later warning of an "arc of autocracy" threatening global stability. His government also advanced a more assertive defense posture through the AUKUS partnership, signaling deeper alignment with the United States amid growing regional security concerns.

During a July 2025 appearance before the United States House Select Committee on the Chinese Communist Party, Morrison reiterated his long-held concerns about the strategic threat posed by China. He argued that while Beijing had shifted from overt economic coercion to more conciliatory diplomatic tactics following the 2022 Australian federal election, its core objectives remained unchanged—namely, to weaken US influence in the Indo-Pacific and reshape the international order to suit authoritarian interests. He warned that Western democracies, including Australia, risk "going to sleep on the threat" posed by the Chinese Communist Party if they are swayed by what he described as "charm and flattery".

Morrison has also criticised the Albanese government's approach to defence spending, calling for an increase to 3.5% of GDP by 2035 and warning against displacing broader defence capabilities in favour of the AUKUS submarine pact. Citing polling by the Lowy Institute showing a shift in Australian public opinion toward viewing China more as an economic partner than a security threat, he argued that such sentiment aligned with the CCP's objectives to diminish vigilance in democratic societies. He maintained that dialogue alone would not deter Beijing's strategic ambitions and called for greater internal resilience and stronger security partnerships.

=== Zionism, Antisemitism, and criticism of Islam ===
In December 2025 he attended the funeral of Rabbi Eli Schlager with Israeli Diaspora Affairs Minister Amichai Chikli and several sitting Australian politicians.

In late January 2026, Morrison advocated greater government oversight over Islamic institutions and community bodies in Australia during a speech at an antisemitism conference in Israel and in an op-ed column in The Australian. These proposed measures have included a national register and accreditation system for Islamic clergy, and expanding foreign interference frameworks to capture foreign links in religious institutions. Morrison urged the Australian government to focus on "radicalised extremist Islam" in light of the 2025 Bondi Beach shooting and called on local Muslim bodies to combat hate. He also suggested that Australia could adopt Saudi Arabia, Jordan and Bahrain's policies of regulating Islamic teaching, clerical registration, and revising curriculums in order to combat radicalism within the Australian Muslim community. In response, the Australian Federation of Islamic Councils (AFIC) described Morrison's proposal as reckless, deeply offensive and profoundly dangerous" while Aftab Malik, the special envoy to combat Islamophobia, said that religious extremism must be confront but that it "must never be used as a pretext to curtail freedoms, police faith, or cast suspicion over an entire community." By contrast, Liberal MP Andrew Bragg expressed support for Morrison's policies of registering and accrediting Islamic clergy and said that Australian Muslims needed "to take some responsibility for extremist incidents." Labor cabinet minister Pat Conroy expressed disagreement with Morrison and Bragg's remarks, stating it was "incredibly unfair" to hold the entire Australian Muslim community responsible for the actions of extremists.

== Public image ==
Morrison was one of Australia's most popular and unpopular prime ministers. At the height of the COVID-19 pandemic in April 2020, Morrison's job performance was approved by 68 percent of voters, one of the highest approval ratings for an Australian prime minister on record. However, by March 2022, Morrison's popularity had greatly declined, and he was found to be Australia's least trusted politician in a study by Roy Morgan Research. A study taken after his government's defeat in the 2022 federal election conducted by the Australian National University in December 2022 found that Morrison was the most unpopular major party leader since the beginning of the survey in 1987. In a poll conducted by The Guardian in September 2022, over half of respondents believed Morrison should resign from Parliament. Research conducted by The Sydney Morning Herald and The Age in December 2023 found Morrison to be Australia's most disliked politician. Political historian Paul Strangio wrote in February 2024 that Morrison would likely "be rated among the least distinguished of Australian prime ministers." Likewise, journalist Niki Savva posited that "among his detractors... Morrison was regarded as the worst prime minister since Billy McMahon", and Chris Wallace of The Saturday Paper labelled him as "easily the worst prime minister since Federation". Conservative figures and outlets have been more positive in their assessments of Morrison's premiership, with The Australian editorialising in 2024 that his legacy will be "acknowledged as substantial and far-reaching", praising his government's response to the COVID-19 pandemic and his foreign policy with regard to forming the AUKUS agreement and denouncement of "China's economic coercion".

The veracity of comments made by Morrison has been criticised, and he has repeatedly made false and misleading statements, despite stating in a radio interview in November 2021 that he does not believe he has told a lie in public life. In October 2021, French president Emmanuel Macron publicly accused Morrison of lying over the cancellation of a proposed submarine pact between France and Australia. Morrison's predecessor Malcolm Turnbull also questioned Morrison's credibility, saying, "[Morrison] can twist and turn and leak a text message here and leak a document there to his stenographic friends in the media, but ultimately the failure here was one of not being honest." In November 2021, Turnbull also commented that Morrison "has always had a reputation for telling lies" and had lied to him "on many occasions".

In January and February 2022, texts from his Coalition colleagues were leaked. In January 2022, texts between former New South Wales premier Gladys Berejiklian and an unnamed senior cabinet minister in the Morrison government were revealed, wherein Morrison was labelled a "horrible, horrible person" by the former premier and a "complete psycho" by the minister. This was soon followed by leaked texts sent from deputy prime minister Barnaby Joyce, who in March 2021 accused Morrison of being "a hypocrite and a liar" in text messages. Joyce apologised and offered his resignation to Morrison, but it was declined. In March and April 2022, New South Wales state Liberal MP Catherine Cusack accused Morrison of being a "self-serving bully", and using the Eastern Australia floods as a political tactic. In April 2022, sitting Liberal Senator Concetta Fierravanti-Wells condemned Morrison as being "unfit for office", as well as an "autocrat", and a "bully" with "no moral compass". She also suggested Morrison had used his religion as a "marketing advantage".

== Religious beliefs ==
Morrison was raised in the Presbyterian Church of Australia, which partly merged into the Uniting Church when he was a child. He later became a Pentecostal and now attends the Horizon Church, which is affiliated with the Australian Christian Churches. Morrison was Australia's first Pentecostal prime minister. As a Pentecostal and evangelical church, Horizon is not a mainstream church in Australia. Some members believe in divine healing, and practise "speaking in tongues", which is seen as a miraculous gift from God.

While the Australian Christian Lobby welcomed the appointment of a prime minister with such a deep faith, some Australians have been suspicious of its effect on his rulings. As Treasurer of Australia during the vote for legislation on same-sex marriage in 2017, Morrison abstained from voting due to his faith. He has said, "the Bible is not a policy handbook, and I get very worried when people try to treat it like one". In late 2017, Morrison stated that he would become a stronger advocate for protections for religious freedom.

He thinks misuse of social media is the work of "the evil one" and practises the Christian tradition of the "laying on of hands" while working. He said in a speech to the Australian Christian Churches conference in April 2021 that he believes he was elected to do God's work, although he later said that his comments were mischaracterised and that they were meant to reflect his belief that "whatever you do every day... is part of your Christian service".

In July 2022, he told a Pentecostal church congregation that, speaking from experience, he believed that people should not trust governments or the United Nations but should put their trust in God, stating, "We trust in Him. We don't trust in governments. We don't trust in United Nations, thank goodness." Morrison's successor as prime minister, Anthony Albanese, found this statement "quite astonishing" and the reference to the United Nations a "nonsense throwaway conspiracy line".

== Personal life ==
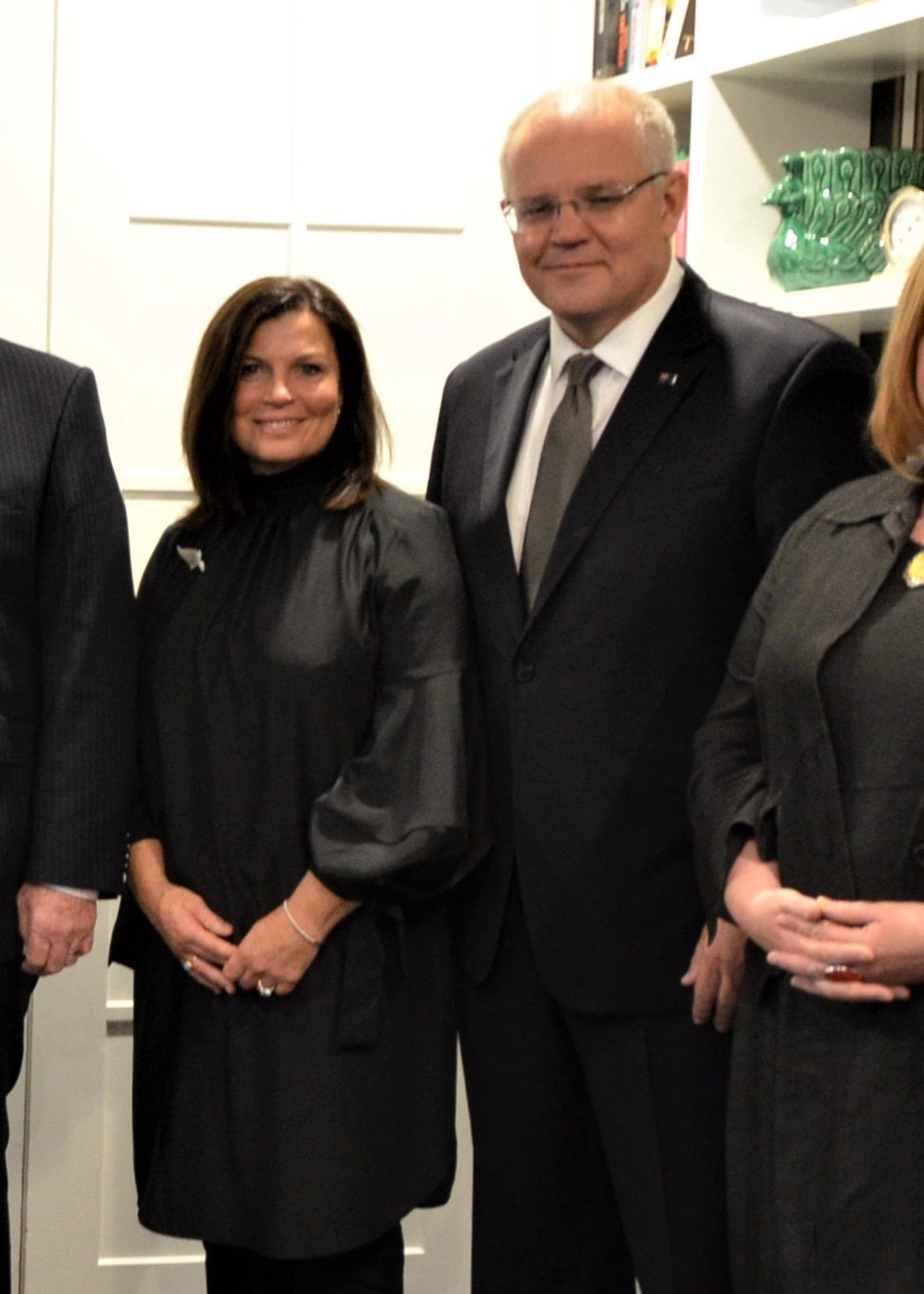
Scott and Jenny Morrison in March 2019

Morrison is a fan of rugby union and supported the Eastern Suburbs RUFC during his childhood. After moving to the Sutherland Shire, he became a fan of the Cronulla-Sutherland Sharks rugby league team and was named the club's number-one ticket holder in 2016.

=== Marriage and children ===
Morrison began dating Jenny Warren when they were both 16. They married in 1990, when Morrison was 21 and Warren was 22, and have two daughters together. After multiple unsuccessful IVF treatments over a period of 14 years, their daughters were conceived naturally. Their daughters attend an independent Baptist school. Morrison has stated that one of the reasons for this choice was so that he could avoid "the values of others being imposed on my children".

=== Health ===
In 2024, Morrison revealed he had been prescribed medication for anxiety during his prime ministership amidst the COVID pandemic, which he blamed on "pure physical exhaustion" and the "unrelenting and callous brutality of politics".

== Honours ==
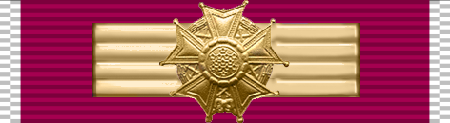

=== National ===
- 9 June 2025 Companion of the Order of Australia (AC), For eminent service to the people and Parliament of Australia, particularly as prime minister, to notable contributions to global engagement, to leadership of the national COVID-19 response, to economic initiatives, and to national security enhancements, especially through leadership of Australia's contribution to AUKUS.
- (Australia) 14 July 2000 Australian Sports Medal

=== Foreign honours ===
- 22 December 2020 Chief Commander of the Legion of Merit, by the president of the United States, Donald J. Trump.

== In popular culture ==
- Morrison was portrayed by Justin Smith for ABC series Shakedown based on the 2015-19 Robodebt scandal. Morrison at the time of Robodebt was the Minister for Social Services.

== Notes ==
Parliament of Australia
Preceded by Bruce Baird	Member of Parliament for Cook; 2007–2024	Succeeded by Simon Kennedy
Political offices
Preceded by Tony Burke	Minister for Immigration and Border Protection; 2013–2014	Succeeded by Peter Dutton
Preceded by Kevin Andrews	Minister for Social Services; 2014–2015	Succeeded by Christian Porter
Preceded by Joe Hockey	Treasurer of Australia; 2015–2018	Succeeded by Josh Frydenberg
Preceded by Malcolm Turnbull	Prime Minister of Australia; 2018–2022	Succeeded by Anthony Albanese
Preceded by Mathias Cormann	Minister for the Public Service; 2019–2021	Succeeded by Ben Morton
Party political offices
Preceded by Malcolm Turnbull	Leader of the Liberal Party; 2018–2022	Succeeded by Peter Dutton
