= John Douglas Morrison =

Australian police officer (1934–2020)

John Douglas Morrison OAM

Mayor of Waverley
- In office 23 September 1985 – September 1986
- Deputy: Alan Slade
- Preceded by: Ray Collins
- Succeeded by: Carolyn Markham

Deputy Mayor of Waverley
- In office September 1984 – 23 September 1985
- Mayor: Ray Collins
- Preceded by: Ray Collins
- Succeeded by: Alan Slade

Alderman of the Municipality of Waverley for Lawson Ward
- In office 7 December 1968 – 18 September 1971
- In office 21 September 1974 – 26 September 1987

Personal details
- Born: 2 December 1934 Waverley, New South Wales, Australia
- Died: 22 January 2020 (aged 85) Bronte, New South Wales, Australia
- Party: Independent
- Spouse: Marion Elsie Smith (m. 1963)
- Children: 2, including Scott Morrison

Military service
- Allegiance: Australia
- Branch/service: Australian Army (1953–1954); NSW Police Force (1954–1992)
- Years of service: 1953–1992
- Rank: Chief Inspector
- Commands: No. 10 Division (Waverley); No. 15 Division (Maroubra)
- Awards: National Police Service Medal; National Medal; Australian Defence Medal; Police Long Service and Good Conduct Medal; Anniversary of National Service 1951–1972 Medal

John Douglas Morrison OAM (2 December 1934 – 22 January 2020) was an Australian police officer for the New South Wales Police Force, where he rose to the rank of Chief Inspector, and local government politician who was an alderman, deputy mayor and mayor of the Municipality of Waverley. He was the father of Australian Prime Minister, Scott Morrison.

== Early life and career ==
Morrison was born in Waverley, New South Wales, in 1934, the son of Douglas Charles John Morrison (1900-1977) and Gwendoline Noel Webster (1902-1979). On 18 August 1953, Morrison was called up to undertake National Service as a private in the Australian Army. On 4 January 1954, at the age of 19, Morrison joined the New South Wales Police Force. He married Marion Elsie Smith (b. 1943) on 16 February 1963 in Sydney.

On 31 March 1983, Sergeant 1st Class Morrison was promoted to the commissioned rank of inspector in the Police Force.

== Political career ==
Morrison was first elected as an alderman of the Municipality of Waverley in December 1968 as an Independent, being one of the first two policemen in the state elected to such an office, follow a rule change that permitted it in 1964. Morrison only served a single term, leaving the Council in September 1971. He stood for election again in September 1974, and was elected. Morrison spearheaded efforts to limit and manage the levels of development that was occurring in Waverley at the time and was recognised as having saved "many of the free-standing homes in Bronte". Although elected as an Independent alderman, Morrison was associated with the unofficial 'Liberal' coalition. In September 1984, he was elected to serve a single term as deputy mayor under mayor Ray Collins.

On 23 September 1985, he defeated Labor alderman Barbara Armitage to succeed Collins and serve a single term as mayor, with the Sydney Morning Herald noting "Alderman Morrison is known for not participating in the often heated debates which have come to characterise the political conflicts on the council. Accusations of inefficiency, lying and personal insults are regularly traded in council by both the left and right. Alderman Morrison acknowledged the deep rift between the seven-member Liberal coalition majority and the five-member Labor team on council but said he hoped that "decorum would reign"." In January 1986 was promoted to the police rank of Chief inspector commanding the No. 10 Division (Woolahra and Waverley) covering the Eastern suburbs. In response to questions of a conflict of interest between his two roles, Morrison noted: "The Police have always worked in close co-operation with Waverley Council". However his police appointment was appealed by several senior police officers at the Police Appeals Tribunal, which subsequently overturned Morrison's appointment in April 1986. Morrison was later promoted to Chief inspector commanding the No. 15 Division (Maroubra) covering the Eastern and Southeast suburbs.

On his time at Council Morrison recalled: "I was an independent, I wasn’t a party man, I managed to get involved in a few things, I saved Bronte from being overdeveloped with high rises, I stopped a huge development which would have changed the social fabric of the whole area." Morrison retired from the Council in September 1987.

== Later life ==
Morrison continued his service in the Police Force until retirement on 11 May 1992. On 27 August 1993, the NSW Minister for Land and Water Conservation, George Souris, appointed Morrison to serve on the Botany General Cemetery and Eastern Suburbs Crematorium Trust. He was reappointed in 1994 and 1999. Reappointed again in 2004, Morrison was Chairman of the Eastern Suburbs Memorial Park Board from 1 January 2005 to 3 August 2012, and led efforts to create and dedicate a Police Memorial in the Eastern Suburbs Memorial Park. The Police Memorial was officially unveiled by Police Commissioner Andrew Scipione on 30 November 2015.

In January 2001, Morrison was awarded the Centenary Medal for "service to the youth". In the 2004 Queen's Birthday Honours, Morrison was awarded the Medal of the Order of Australia (OAM) for "service to the community of eastern Sydney, particularly through youth, church, amateur theatre and service groups."

Morrison died at his home in Bronte, aged 85 on 22 January 2020.

Civic offices
Preceded by Ray Collins	Deputy Mayor of Waverley; 1984–1985	Succeeded by Alan Slade
Preceded by Ray Collins	Mayor of Waverley; 1985–1986	Succeeded by Carolyn Markham
