= Kincumber High School =

Location
- Kincumber, Central Coast, New South Wales; Australia; 33°27′52″S 151°22′57″E

Information
- Type: Government-funded co-educational comprehensive secondary day school
- Motto: To tomorrow
- Established: 1990; 36 years ago
- School district: Brisbane Water; Regional North
- Educational authority: New South Wales Department of Education
- Principal: Brent Walker
- Teaching staff: 73.0 FTE (2018)
- Years: 7–12
- Enrolment: 929 (2018)
- Campus type: Suburban
- Colours: Red, white, and blue
- Website: kincumber-h.schools.nsw.gov.au

Kincumber High School is a government-funded co-educational comprehensive secondary day school, located in Kincumber, in the Central Coast region of New South Wales, Australia.

Established in 1990, the school enrolled approximately 930 students in 2018, from Year 7 to Year 12, of whom five per cent identified as Indigenous Australians and one per cent were from a language background other than English. The school is operated by the NSW Department of Education; the principal is Brent Walker.

The land on which the school lays upon is Darkinjung land.

== See also ==
- List of government schools in New South Wales: G–P
- Education in Australia
