= Monterey Secondary College =

Location
- Silvertop Street; Frankston North, Victoria; Australia; 38°7′38″S 145°8′49″E

Information
- Type: public secondary school
- Motto: Strive
- Established: 1994
- Principal: Bryan Field
- Gender: co-educational
- Enrolment: 500 (approx)
- Campus: urban and parkland
- Colours: cherry, black, white and gold
- Website: monterey.vic.edu.au

Monterey Secondary College is an Australian public, co-educational, secondary school, located in the City of Frankston suburb of Frankston North in Melbourne, Victoria.

Established in 1994, following the merger of Monterey High School and Monterey Technical School, the College has an enrolment of approximately 500 students and is known for its arts, sports and student leadership programs.

== Campus ==
The campus of the College is located in a green belt area near to the northern boundary of the suburb of Frankston and on the southern boundary of the suburb of Frankston North. It is bordered to the south-east by the Peninsula Kingswood Country Golf Club, west by the Long Island Country Golf Club, and north-west by the Eric Bell Sports Reserve. The main entrance to the campus is to the north on Silvertop Street in Frankston North.

In addition to its four main classroom wings, the campus also has centres for dance and drama, music, and science, as well as a large multi-purpose gymnasium. Its grounds are approximately 75,000 square metres (810,000 sq ft) and encompass a number of sports pitches as well as a hobby farm.

== History ==
=== Former schools ===
Of the two antecedent schools that merged to establish the College, Monterey High School was established in 1966 and Monterey Technical School in 1967. The schools served a growing demand for secondary education in the suburbs of Frankston North, Carrum Downs and Seaford. During this time, an Australian Defence Force/Victorian Government housing estate was being expanded in Frankston North, a post-World War II Brotherhood of St Laurence farming settlement was being redeveloped in Carrum Downs, and new home construction was progressing in the suburb of Seaford.

In its foundation year, 1966, the original students of Monterey High School were housed in four portable classroom buildings located at the Monterey State School in Monterey Boulevard. The campus of the High School on Forest Drive was completed in late-1966, with its students moving in at the commencement of 1967. The Technical School operated out of portable buildings at the High School for a year while its own campus was being completed on Silvertop Street. The buildings at each school were constructed of mixed brick and breeze block and were connected via covered and uncovered pathways. Multi-purpose gymnasiums were constructed at each campus and basketball and tennis courts and football and soccer fields were laid on their respective grounds. A music centre was also constructed on the campus of the Technical School and continues to be used by the College today.

=== Merger ===
By the early-1990s, attendance at technical schools in the state of Victoria had declined dramatically as students began to strive for academic achievement rather than for learning a trade. Due to this decline, and to reduce administrative costs, the Department of Education decided to merge the High School and Technical School.

Following a series of consultative parent-teacher meetings, the process of merging the schools was announced to take place between 1993 and 1995. College records state that the main concern voiced by both parents and teachers was that the merger may "incite violence" between the traditionally competitive High School and Technical School students. Some "tension" was reported between students during the merger years of the College, however, a reputation for "unruliness" was short-lived.

The new name of "Monterey Secondary College" was adopted in 1993 and was officially used from 1994. The former Technical School became the main campus (years 7–10) of the College in 1994, while the former High School was retained as a campus for senior students (years 11–12) completing the Victorian Certificate of Education during the merger years. The latter was eventually closed at the end of 1995 and has since been redeveloped into the Monterey Community Park—with a cycling and walking trail, playground, skate park and sports pitches now in place.

=== Recent history ===
In 1997, a petition was presented to the Legislative Assembly of Victoria signed by 1,879 residents of Carrum Downs which sought action for the "construction of suitable facilities in Carrum Downs with the view of relocating Monterey Secondary College from its present location in Frankston North". The petition was unsuccessful. During the 2000s, the public Carrum Downs Secondary College and a campus of the independent Flinders Christian Community College were eventually established in Carrum Downs to ease enrolments at Monterey Secondary College.

In the 1990s, a new multi-purpose gymnasium was constructed with the former gymnasium then redeveloped into a dance and drama centre. Its existing art studios, science labs, technology workshops and theatrette rooms were also upgraded and a hobby farm was added to the grounds. In the 2000s, eight new computer labs were added and its canteen was upgraded. During these decades, the College established its reputation for innovation and success in performing and visual arts.

In the 2010s, a new A$2 million science centre was constructed and all its existing classroom wings were modernised in a A$4 million refurbishment. In 2020, it established the Silvertop Sports Science Academy for elite sports training.

== Arts ==
=== Monterey Art Exhibition ===
The Monterey Art Exhibition is the College's annual student art exhibition, which is held at the Frankston Arts Centre. A notable artist is invited to open the exhibition each year—such as Robyn Bounds and Jeff Hook among others. Since 2015, the winning artwork of the exhibition has been selected for the permanent collection of law firm Gilbert + Tobin and displayed in their Melbourne offices.

=== Bands and ensembles ===
The College has a number of school bands, including junior and senior school bands and a jazz band, as well as other smaller instrumental ensembles. Its jazz band is considered to be one of the finest in the state of Victoria and receives regular invitations for public performances—such as Federation Square in 2004.

=== Rock Eisteddfod Challenge ===
The College first entered in the Rock Eisteddfod Challenge in 1994 with an original production based on the history of the car. It won the 1996 Victorian Premier Division competition with a production based on the Batman comic book and media franchise. Controversy ensued in 1996 when Nine Network broadcast the production of St. Columba's College, based on the 1990s television series The X-Files, instead of the winning production of Monterey Secondary College. It won the 2000 Victorian Premier Division competition with an original production based on the life of the Siberian Ice Maiden. It also produced productions based on the 1960s television series The Thunderbirds and the rise of the Roman Empire before the cancellation of the Challenge in 2010.

== Sports ==
The College has four sports houses that compete in annual whole-College athletics, swimming and cross country sports carnivals as well as other smaller inter-house competitions. Its houses are named after successful College sporting alumni and are: "Bryant" (after badminton player Lisa Campbell (née Bryant); house colour: yellow), "Burke" (after football player Nathan Burke; house colour: green), "Foster" (after triathlete Stephen Foster; house colour: red), and "King" (after cyclist Simon King; house colour: blue). As part of its sports leadership program, each house is led and managed by students.

=== Special programs ===
The Silvertop Sport Science Academy is the College's elite sports training program. The Academy develops the sporting ability and health sciences knowledge of students through its access to elite-level coaches, sportspeople and facilities. Its Sports and Industry Connect program also lets students utilise partner organisations as vehicles for instruction that include: the Australian Football League, Football Federation Victoria and the National Rugby League.

== Leadership ==
The College has a strong student leadership system that has a number of internal and external programs. College captains, junior and senior school prefects, performing arts and sports leadership and its students' representative council are internal programs focused on leadership of the College community and student life. Its external programs include the Advance Youth Development and High Resolves Global Citizenship and Leadership programs which are focused on leadership at a state, national and international level. As a Beacon Model school, it also provides leadership opportunities to students who choose to undertake the Victorian Certificate of Applied Learning through partner organisations that include: Chisholm Institute and CIMIC Group.

== Notable people ==
=== Alumni ===
- Bruce Billson, Member of the Parliament of Australia representing the Division of Dunkley (1996–2016) who was Minister for Veterans' Affairs (2006–2007) and Minister for Small Business (2013–2015)
- Nathan Burke, Australian rules football player (1987–2003) who was captain (1996–2001) and a director (2008–2015) of the St Kilda Football Club
- Lisa Campbell (née Bryant), badminton player who competed in the Commonwealth Games (1994 gold medalist) and Olympic Games
- Russell Greene, Australian rules football player with the St Kilda Football Club (1974–1979) and Hawthorn Football Club (1980–1988)
- Natalie Plane, Australian rules football (AFLW) player with Carlton Football Club (2016–present)
- Jackie Woodburne, actor who currently plays Susan Kennedy on the television soap opera Neighbours (1994–present)

=== Faculty ===
- Janet Matthews, former faculty, wildlife artist whose work is held by Australia Post (for postage stamp reproduction), Gold Coast City Art Gallery and New York State Museum
- Geoff Todd, former faculty, contemporary and portrait artist whose work is held by the Art Gallery of Ballarat, Museum and Art Gallery of the Northern Territory, National Gallery of Australia and National Gallery of Victoria

== International exchange ==
The College established its first international exchange relationship in 2017.

- Adhyapana School, Madurai, India

== See also ==
- Frankston North, Victoria
- Rock Eisteddfod Challenge
