= Monitoring Education for Sustainable Development =

Monitoring Education for Sustainable Development (ESD) refers to measuring progress in ESD learning compared to policy commitments, provision, institutional support, resources and others. Monitoring and evaluation (M&E) of Education for Sustainable Development is widely discussed in literature on ESD, including debates regarding methodology and strategies for interpreting the data.

== Purposes and benefits of monitoring ESD ==
New information, analysis and predictions feed into ‘improve[d] decision making and action-taking’ to guide and reorient programmes. This process increases understanding about the elements necessary to promote ESD learning in a particular context, and can influence other stakeholders. The desired outcome is wider social learning and enhanced ESD knowledge and skills, potentially resulting in diverse activities that promote not just better learning but the ultimate goal of ESD: sustainable living throughout life.

A main requirement of effective M&E in education and learning is clear objectives, also called competencies, which stem from defined concepts in a subject. The more dynamic aspects of ESD cannot be boxed into a measurable definition because they centre on the unknown and the emergent: they revolve around new concepts and ideas produced by learners to help populations confront global issues such as climate change. It is not always possible to know what to monitor because learners are partially leading the process. Differentiating ESD from two subject areas is challenging because it is often lumped together with – its precursor, environmental education (EE), and global citizenship education (GCED), which runs complementarily.

There is a governance and accountability angle to M&E of ESD. It involves verifying that all learners have access, that the process is inclusive and that the learning provided is suitable. At the national level, it is crucial that education authorities be in a position to account for how a significant share of public expenditure (supplemented by sizeable private investment) is ensuring the right of all children, youth and adults to basic educational opportunities that lead to effective and relevant learning. M&E also accounts ‘for ensuring equal opportunity for post-basic education and training’.

Monitoring is not only concerned with learning, but effective learning for all, and therefore operates from a position of social justice. It helps to keep special interests and the marketization of education in check, by regulating the private sector to ‘ensure the application of standards adopted by education professionals working in both public and private sectors’. M&E aims to protect and uphold access to quality education for all people throughout life by reining in potentially dominant special interest forces.

== Historical efforts in ESD monitoring ==
From 2005 to 2014, UNESCO worked on prioritizing and advancing ESD. Based on United Nations General Assembly Resolution 57/254, the UN Decade of Education for Sustainable Development (DESD) was conceived as a way to foreground principles and practices of sustainability and marry them with education and learning. This marriage aimed to strengthen ESD worldwide with a view to effecting positive, sustainable change in the ways that people – in this case, learners – make choices and live their lives in relationship to others and their local environment, ultimately transforming broader social behaviour and its effects on the planet. The conclusion was that it was necessary to monitor efforts to observe the kind of progress being made. This information could be fed back into the process leading to changes and improvements resulting in better ESD learning. The common practice was to measure ESD through inputs, including the ‘development of strategies, plans, coordinating mechanisms and resources’. This approach reflected a more top-down approach to M&E often driven by national reporting to international agencies. It was also representative of a belief that inputs inevitably lead to outputs. However, the effect of inputs and throughputs on ESD learning proved difficult to see.

This suggested three things:

- equating inputs with outputs amounted to a leap of faith, and was not backed up by the evidence. Accordingly, different or a combination of M&E strategies were needed;
- DESD activities were not making an immediately observable difference on the ground; and
- more information was needed about the context, educational process and so on. Such input-output thinking often goes hand-in-hand with an overly focused conversation about indicators (which are sometimes presented as the solution in themselves).

This mix reflects the balance and tension between translating global and local concerns into goals and targets, and having indicators that help collect information on activities that demonstrate progress towards them. Both are important, as the wider call for sustainable development is a response to overarching, multifaceted (global) problems, such as climate change and specific (local) manifestations and effects on different places for actual people. During the Decade, the DESD Monitoring and Evaluation Expert Group (MEEG) developed various ESD indicators as part of their Global Monitoring and Evaluation Framework. Early involvement of stakeholders and establishing agreed-upon goals will be vital to addressing this indicator development challenge’. Coordination between National Commissions and designated working groups led to various types of indicator development bodies each with different purposes. This strategy resulted in an open and connected process that was part of a larger M&E scheme.

An outcome from the Decade is that many M&E experts now believe in evaluating programmes and practices at multiple levels and stages of the educational process. Possible multipronged frameworks involve large-scale student assessments and country-level and lower assessments related to contextualized ESD aims and purposes. This may include evaluation of the learning environment focusing on pedagogy and learner engagement, and formative assessments to improve professional practice among teachers through peer engagement.

== How countries monitor ESD ==
Finding data on how countries monitor ESD has proven difficult. References in the literature to country approaches to M&E invariably follow the model of collecting and analysing policies, capacity-building efforts, implementation, earning objectives, teacher and curriculum, partnerships and networks, and so on. There is little mention of holistic schemes or systems operating in unison. Some instances provide decontextualized discussions about indicators and assessments to evaluate learning outcomes. As these discussions are not part of a larger whole or anchored to country activities, they lose their concrete value and simply amount to a reiteration of oversimplified, input leads-to-output thinking without any information about what happens between inputs and learning outcomes. There are a few examples of studies where M&E of ESD within countries could have been inquired about and pointed to, but were not for some reason.

The United Nations Economic Commission for Europe (UNECE) Initiative on Education for Sustainable Development includes an objective to ‘promote research on and development of ESD. However, the ten-year evaluation report on implementation does not provide examples of monitoring, and notes only that more and better practices are needed. The United Nations University Institute of Advanced Studies (UNU-IAS) and the Institute for Global Environmental Strategies (IGES) collaborated on a research project with the UNESCO Asia and Pacific Regional Bureau for Education on M&E for ESD in 2011 to 2012. The study covered nine countries in North and Southeast Asia over two rounds of surveys using a mixed-methods approach (both quantitative and qualitative with a bridge connecting the two data sets). Similar to the UNECE report, key input, content and process areas were examined. There is lengthy discussion in the final report about the benefits and deficiencies of monitoring, but an absence of country cases to illustrate these points. Examples of what is described and promoted as good practice can be useful.

A publication developed by UNESCO in 2013 entitled National Journeys towards Education for Sustainable Development offers some detail and analysis of M&E in countries within the five world regions, focusing on: Costa Rica, Morocco, South Africa, Sweden and Viet Nam. In the case of Costa Rica, monitoring is addressed but mostly in relation to sustainable human development through the annual report, State of the Nation. Further leadership is mentioned as a key concern – one that also impacts M&E. According to the report, Morocco does not appear to have a comprehensive ESD M&E approach in place, including indicators.

Accordingly, the report advocates for using SWOT (strengths, weaknesses, opportunities and threats) to evaluate performance. Versions of this approach are also applied to other country profiles in the report. According to the publication, South Africa has a strong tradition of M&E in ESD, and implemented the National Environmental Education Project for General Education and Training (NEEP-GET). This is ‘one of the largest, most comprehensive formative monitoring and evaluation (FME) processes’, which focused on ‘contextual monitoring and longitudinal studies, as well as critical appraisals of key issues’. In Sweden, the Institute for Research in Education and Sustainable Development (IRESD) is ‘one of the most expansive and acclaimed research environments for education and sustainable development in Sweden’. However, the report does not provide information on how this links to monitoring ESD. According to the publication, Viet Nam's approach is focused on ‘project based mechanisms and indicators’. This includes manuals and guidelines for M&E of ESD, and relevant teacher training.

Evidence shows that many countries are only getting started. The process of developing holistic, multipronged M&E systems for tracking ESD is still in the early stages. More needs to be done (and documented) with an emphasis on the driving reason for monitoring ESD in the first place: to gain information to make good decisions about policies, provision, institutional support, resources, and so on, that lead to better ESD learning and, ideally, broader sustainable behavior.

== Sources ==
This article incorporates text from a free content work. Licensed under CC BY-SA (license statement/permission). Text taken from Issues and trends in Education for Sustainable Development, UNESCO.
