= Climate change education =

Education that aims to address and develop effective responses to climate change

A UNESCO diagram visualising a "whole school approach" to climate change

Climate change education (CCE) is education that aims to address and develop effective responses to climate change. It helps learners understand the causes and consequences of climate change, prepares them to live with the impacts of climate change and empowers learners to take appropriate actions to adopt more sustainable lifestyles. Climate change and climate change education are global challenges that can be anchored in the curriculum in order to provide local learning and widen up mindset shifts on how climate change can be mitigated. In such a case, CCE is more than climate change literacy, but understanding ways of dealing with climate.

CCE helps policymakers understand the urgency and importance of putting mechanisms into place to combat climate change on a national and global scale. Communities learn about how climate change will affect them, what they can do to protect themselves from negative consequences, and how they can reduce their own carbon footprint. In particular, CCE helps increase the resilience of already vulnerable communities who are the most likely to be adversely affected by climate change.

CCE is rooted in Education for sustainable development (ESD).

== UNESCO Climate Change Education for Sustainable Development programme ==
Established in 2010, the UNESCO Climate Change Education for Sustainable Development programme (CCESD) aims to help people understand climate change by expanding CCE activities in nonformal education through the media, networking and partnerships. With the help of organizations and individuals, UNESCO is able to host the World Higher Education Conference (in Barcelona 2022). It is grounded in the holistic approach of Education for Sustainable Development (ESD) which incorporates key sustainable development issues such as climate change, disaster risk reduction and others into education, in a way that addresses the interdependence of environmental sustainability, economic viability and social justice. It promotes participatory teaching and learning methods that motivate and empower learners to change their behaviour and take action for sustainable development. The programme seeks to help people understand the impact of global warming today and increase 'climate literacy', especially among young people, and aims to make education a more central part of the international response to climate change. UNESCO works with national governments to integrate CCE into national curricula and to develop innovative teaching and learning approaches for doing so.

== Selected country profiles regarding CCE and ESD ==
=== Argentina ===
In 2020 Argentina passed Yolanda's Law (Spanish: Ley Yolanda), which requires all members of the executive, legislative and judicial branches of government to undertake 16 hours of environmental education. This must include information about climate change, the protection of biodiversity and ecosystems, energy efficiency and renewable energies, the circular economy and sustainable development, as well as information related to current environmental regulations. As of September 2023, 50,000 officials of the three branches of government have been trained.

In March 2021 Argentina passed 'The Comprehensive Environmental Education Law' (Spanish: (Ley de Educación Ambiental), which establishes the right to comprehensive environmental education as a national public policy.

=== Australia ===
Australia has been at the forefront of education for sustainability, adopting in 2000 a national plan entitled Environmental Education for a Sustainable Future. A number of initiatives and bodies were created to implement the national plan, including the Australian Sustainable Schools Initiative and Australian Research Institute for Environment and Sustainability. These provided a strong foundation for Australia's strategy, launched in 2006, to respond to the UN Decade of Education for Sustainable Development. The strategy set out the goal to mainstream sustainability through a holistic approach that engages the community through education and lifelong learning. Whereas climate change was referred to as one of a number of environmental concerns in the first national plan, a new plan launched in 2009, entitled Living Sustainably: the Australian Government's National Action Plan for Education for Sustainability, had a greater focus on climate change and its impacts on other natural resources within a wider global context. The new plan incorporated climate change within education for sustainability, rather than establishing a new and potentially competing field of Climate Change Education. Australia introduced its first-ever national curriculum in 2014, including sustainability as one of three cross-curriculum subjects.

Since 2009, Climate Change Education has been most evident in the VET sector. COAG endorsed the Green Skills Agreement in 2009, and the Ministerial Council for Vocational and Technical Education published the National VET Sector Sustainability Policy and Action Plan (2009-2012). These initiatives aimed to provide workers with the skills needed to transition to a low-carbon economy and VET teachers with suitable training packages to promote education for sustainability.

=== China ===
China introduced environmental education in the late 1970s as a result of increased attention to sustainable development and the need to protect the environment. Following the United Nations Conference on Environment and Development (Rio de Janeiro, 1992), environmental education moved towards environment, population and development, and finally education for sustainable development.

The Chinese government has produced a number of policy documents identifying environmental education and ESD as key to quality education. In 2003, the Ministry of Education issued the first guiding policy - the Guidelines for Implementing Environmental Education in Elementary and Secondary School - on environmental education in China. ESD was formally incorporated into the national education policy in 2010 in The National Education Outline 2010-2020, and further integrated in some local education policies. National climate change policies and plans in China refer to education but do not specifically address CCE. This has resulted in limited institutional support to date. There is no national ESD or CCE action plan or official policy to inform its implementation.

In China, ESD mainly refers to providing individuals with the scientific knowledge, learning capacity, values and lifestyle choices to meet the country's sustainable development objectives. CCE is most commonly implemented as a component of ESD. A number of educational approaches have been adopted to facilitate the implementation of ESD. These include integrating ESD values into school philosophy, curriculum development, capacity-building of teachers and educators, ESD pedagogical approaches and ESD and CCE thematic activities.

ESD is a component of compulsory education, but is limited in higher education, VET and adult education. The Ministry of Education has recently issued a guidance document that identified the VET sector in particular as needing to be reformed to meet the sustainable development objectives of the Chinese economy.

=== Denmark ===
Denmark and its neighbouring countries began working together in the 1990s to formulate a policy for ESD. While Denmark signed the United Nations Economic Commission for Europe (UNECE) declaration on ESD in 2005, it did not adopt a strategy until 2009, just before the half-way point of the DESD. The Ministry of Education, which was made responsible for the DESD, organised a consultation process on how to promote ESD before adopting its strategy in 2009.

The UN Climate Summit (COP15) held in Denmark in December 2009 provided the impetus to develop of a number of national ESD policy initiatives. A national strategy on ESD was developed with a substantial climate change component. The aim of the strategy is to make citizens more responsible for their actions by improving their scientific knowledge. The ESD strategy notes that climate change should not be the sole focus of ESD, though the concrete initiatives that are part of the strategy mostly support the CCE projects and activities that were part of COP15 preparations.

A new national school curriculum adopted in 2009 included elements of ESD and CCE. The concept of sustainability was embedded in the goals describing the interrelationships between nature and society. CCE is mostly approached as teaching climate science, but it was also included in subjects such as geography and social studies, where the interrelationships between human behaviour, consumption and climate are examined.

There has been no explicit policy change in the TVET sector to upgrade skills to respond to climate change and environmental issues. However, the Danish TVET sector had previously reflected skills related to ecological modernisation in areas such as energy generation, waste management and agriculture. While the new government identified the economic and environmental climate change crises as important, education is only referred to in relation to the economic crisis. There is no mention of climate change or sustainability with regard to education, and the platform documentation on 'green transition' does not mention education. Overall, no policy strategy has been set to promote ESD, CCE, or the 'greening' of TVET as part of the government's sustainable development and climate change policies. Government initiatives support NGO-led projects to raise community awareness of climate change. A national network on ESD was established with funding through to 2013.

=== Dominican Republic ===
The Dominican Republic has taken a lead role in promoting ESD. Environmental education was made mandatory for all schools in 1998 and this has since evolved into ESD. In 2000, the General Law of Environment and Natural Resources changed the way environmental education was taught, moving from a subject matter to a cross-cutting and interdisciplinary theme. Risk management is also an important aspect of MINERD's strategic plan, and has been integrated into the school curriculum as a cross-cutting subject. In 2004, the Environmental Education Strategy for Sustainable Development was adopted, which fosters formal and non-formal ESD. It is based on constructivism and uses a variety of pedagogical techniques that promote participatory learning.

The Ten-year 2008-2018 Education Plan (PDE) addresses the issue of quality education, including sustainable development and a culture of peace. It also established a process for periodic review of the curriculum. Climate change is also being introduced into the curriculum. The National Teacher Training Institute (INAFOCAM) and the Salomé Ureña Higher Institute for Teacher Training (ISFODOSU) provide support for environmental education through teacher training and curriculum support. The Ten-year 2008-2018 Higher Education Plan (PDES) includes environmental issues in the curricula and establishes a research programme to promote sustainable development.

The Dominican Republic has been involved in a number of ESD and CCE initiatives that have helped build local capacity, including:

- formal, non-formal and informal projects on ESD led by governmental agencies, civil society organizations, young leaders and local communities;
- UN: CC Learn Project, which supports the design and implementation of results-oriented and sustainable learning to address climate change (see the detailed case study in this Report);
- National Strategy to Strengthen Human Resource Capacities to Advance Green, Low Emission and Climate Resilient Development (ENDVBERC);
- teacher training supported by the UN: CC Learn-UNITAR, and the UNESCO-CCESD pilot programme.

=== UK ===
In the United Kingdom, the Teach the Future campaign aims to rapidly repurpose the education system around the climate emergency and ecological crisis; they are cohosted by the UK Student Climate Network and SOS-UK and are in the process of devolving their campaign to Scotland and Northern Ireland from England.

They have three asks of the Government:

- A government commissioned review into how the English formal education system is preparing students for the climate emergency and ecological crisis
- The inclusion of the climate emergency and ecological crisis in English teaching standards and training
- The enactment of an English Climate Emergency Education Act - the first student written bill in history

==== England ====
Environmental and development education have been present in England since the 1970s, when civil society organizations took the lead. From the late 1990s, the UK government promoted sustainable development and ESD at the local, regional and national levels. However, while a number of strategic government reports addressed CCE, government policy has focused less on ESD since 2010.

The 2008 report Brighter Futures – Greener Lives: Sustainable Development Action Plan 2008-2010 outlined a number of specific initiatives related to Climate Change Education using an ESD approach. This included empowering youth with the skills, knowledge and freedom to voice their opinions and make a difference. The same year, CCE was introduced into the Key Stage 3 (11 to 14 year-olds) geography curriculum.

The report Education for Sustainable Development in the UK 2010 noted that there were signs of substantial progress in embedding ESD-related policies and developing practices in the UK across a wide range of sectors in 2008 and 2009. For example, documents in 2009 highlighted the 'Sustainable Schools' project that aims to empower youth to cope with the future challenges facing the planet. The aim is for all schools to be 'Sustainable Schools' by 2020.

==== Scotland ====
The Scottish Government commissioned a climate change TV advert, possibly as part of public awareness program.

=== Republic of Korea ===
The Republic of Korea has a number of policies and initiatives supporting environmental education. In 2008, the Environmental Education Promotion Act encouraged the development of environmental education. It aimed to raise national environmental awareness, to encourage people to develop research and inquiry skills, and to put what they learn into action.

The Ministry of Environment, in its 2011-2015 Environmental Education Master Plan, proposed a policy agenda for environmental education to be implemented through formal education, social environmental education and educational infrastructure approaches. The various approaches in the formal education area include:

- 'Environment and Green Growth' as an elective subject in middle and high school curricula, and classes in elementary school designed to integrate environmental education;
- the establishment of the Natural Environmental Studies Institute that offers interactive youth programmes for environmental studies;
- Environment Model Schools, designed to demonstrate best-practice;
- 'Low Carbon Challenge' involving ten universities;
- in-service training for teachers to upskill, specializing in environmental education.

=== Turkey ===
Climate change education is an option in 6th, 7th and 8th grades of education in Turkey. As of 2025 there is not much teacher training or school materials, however there is higher education and research at Boğaziçi University's Center for Climate Change and Policy Studies. In 2025 results will be measured by the Programme for International Student Assessment. The government said in 2026 that it is "Integrating Türkiye’s net-zero emissions target into every level of the education system". İklim Masası (Climate Desk) is a news platform with experts writing for the public and as a reference for journalists.

Sabancı University's Shura Energy Transition Center is researching decarbonization pathways. Linear regression, expert judgement and local integrated assessment modelling is used for non-energy projections. Emissions from industry have been modelled by the Energy Ministry and the Scientific and Technological Research Council of Turkey using TIMES-MACRO. A "Climate Change Platform" is planned to share studies and data.Although the OECD praised the government's monitoring, reporting and verification (MRV) system and said in 2021 that it covers half of total emissions, unlike the public sharing of data in the EU emission trading system, much detailed emissions data in Turkey is not public. However in 2025 Hayrettin Kurt, Chairman of the Audit Committee at the World Energy Council Turkish National Committee, said that facility level data from the Turkish Emissions Trading System will be disclosed to the public. Quantitative estimates of the impact of individual government policies on emissions have not been made or are not publicly available; neither are projections of long-term policy impacts. An expert review of Turkey's GHG report published in 2023 noted that over 50 recommendations made in previous expert reviews had not yet been addressed. Space-based measurements of the signs of emissions has allowed public monitoring of the megacity of Istanbul and high emitting power plants since the early-2020s.

=== Vietnam ===
The development of ESD in Vietnam took place in the most recent decades. The National Council of Sustainable Development was formed in 2006 to acknowledge the United Nations Decade of Education for Sustainable Development (DESD). A committee consisting of high-ranking leaders such as government leaders and ministers were appointed to develop an education for sustainability guideline.

The Ministry for Education and Training (MOET) played an important role to push forward establishment goals for ESD and CCE. Furthermore, they were also able to recognize the climate change impacts overall in Vietnam such as increase in average temperature and sea rise level. From 1951-2000, Vietnam's global average temperature increased about 0.5-0.7 Celsius, and sea level had risen about 20 cm. These two factors had put a hold on the growing socioeconomic achievements; therefore, MOET acted on the development education aspects to mitigate climate change in the future. The first key steps MOET promoted toward ESD and CCE were the National Action Plan of Education for Sustainable Development of Viet Nam in 2010 and the Action Plan for Response to Climate Change of the Education Sector for the period of 2011-2015.

Action Plan of Education for Sustainable Development

In 2016, Vietnam, Costa Rica, and Kenya started their partnership with UNESCO to establish high standard ESD policies at a regional and global level. Through UNESCO, there were four main projects that the countries can get involved in different socioeconomic levels such as Advancing ESD policy development, A whole-institution approach to climate change through the UNESCO Associated Schools Network (ASPnet), Sustainability starts with teachers, Empower youth ESD leaders as change agents, and Community for ESD.

Climate Change Education

In 2009, MOET was able to develop and implement environmental education (EE) and CCE education into formal education curriculum. This gained approval from ESD standpoints, however it was still not considered to count towards all ESD approaches. Furthermore, one of the main challenges MOET was facing during this time was an increase of materials on top the regular curriculum, resulted in overloading students with knowledge.

=== United States of America ===
Since the year 2013, over 20 states and the District of Columbia have adopted the Next Generation Science Standards which encourages "climate literacy" in order to better educate students of Earth's current climate crisis with updated scientific information around climate change. According to the Yale Program on Climate Change Communication, Americans in all 50 states support the education of climate change to children in schools.

In 2020, the New Jersey State Board of Education adopted new learning standards which integrate climate change across all content areas; the standards came into effect with the 2022-23 school year, making New Jersey the first state to do so.

=== Ghana ===
In response to the global demand for increased governmental action to tackle the adverse effects of climate change and the advancement of climate science on both international and local levels, the Government of Ghana (GoG) has undertaken several measures to integrate climate change into the nation’s development plans. As a participant in the UNFCCC, Ghana also attends the annual Conference of the Parties (CoP) meetings. The Ghanaian government launched the National Climate Change Policy (NCCP) in 2014 to address climate change challenges and promote a green economy. The policy aims for a climate resilient and compatible economy, sustainable development, and low carbon economic growth.

The National Environment Policy (NEP) also emphasizes capacity building, educating stakeholders in sustainable environmental practices. Other key national policies include the National Youth Policy, Ghana's Educational Policy, and the Low Carbon Development Strategy. Ghana's development aspirations are reflected in the GSGDA I & II, which emphasize climate resilience.

== See also ==
- UNESCO ASPnet
- Global Citizenship Education
- Climate-friendly school
- Environmental education
- United Nations Framework Convention on Climate Change (UNFCCC)

== Sources ==
This article incorporates text from a free content work. Licensed under CC-BY-SA IGO 3.0 (license statement/permission). Text taken from Not Just Hot Air: Putting Climate Change Education into Practice, 6, 8, 10, 32, 40, 44, 46, 48, 58, UNESCO, UNESCO. UNESCO.
