= Frankston North =

- Suburb
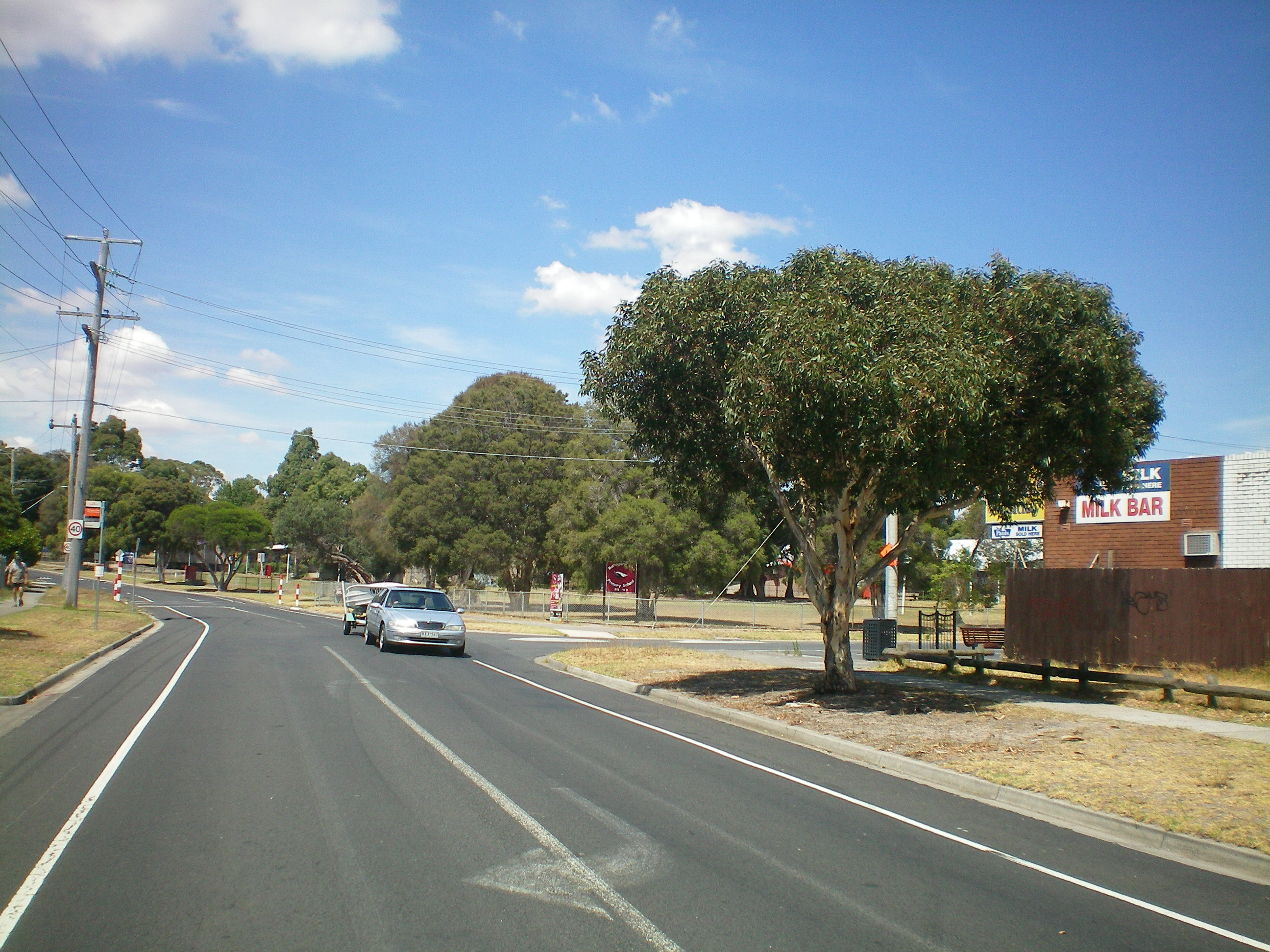
- Street in Frankston North, Victoria.

- Interactive map of Frankston North
- Coordinates: 38.123°S 145.153°E
- Country: Australia
- State: Victoria
- City: Melbourne
- LGA: City of Frankston
- Location: 38 km (24 mi) from Melbourne; 3 km (1.9 mi) from Frankston

Government
  - State electorates: Frankston; Hastings
  - Federal division: Dunkley

Area
  - Total: 5.2 km^{2} (2.0 sq mi)

Population
  - Total: 5,711 (2021 census)
  - Density: 1,098/km^{2} (2,845/sq mi)
- Postcode: 3200
Suburbs around Frankston North
| Seaford | Carrum Downs | Carrum Downs |
| Seaford | Frankston North | Skye |
| Frankston | Frankston | Langwarrin |

Frankston North (originally the Pines Forest Estate, also known as "The Pines") is a suburb in Melbourne, Victoria, Australia, 38 km south-east of Melbourne's central business district, located within the City of Frankston local government area. Frankston North recorded a population of 5,711 at the 2021 census.

== History ==
=== Reserve created for preservation and growth of timber ===
In 1853, a 42 square miles (109 km^{2}) 'run' of land, named "Balleymarong" edit was established and later acquired by Sir Andrew Clarke, surveyor general to the Colony of Victoria from 1853. Balleymarong's northern boundary was Eumemmering Creek (now the Patterson River). The southern boundary was Skye Road. Boundary Road (now McClelland Drive) was the eastern boundary with the western side boundary being Port Phillip Bay.

The 1860 Victorian Land Act led to the sub-division and sale of land in Balleymarong. The Victorian Government reserved 3,600 acres (15 km^{2}) for various purposes. 1,370 acres (6 km^{2}) was set aside 'For the Preservation and Growth of Timber'.

Circa 1870, the inbound 'Clarke Reserve' was proposed as an alternative site for the Old Melbourne Cemetery. It was later agreed that an area at Springvale was a better site. The 'Clarke Reserve' was established in 1909 as a State Pine forest called the Frankston Pine Plantation. W.J. Hartland was appointed as Conservator in Charge. Pinus radiata was the most successful of the various species planted. A count taken of numbers revealed that over 1 million trees had been planted.

James Brown was appointed as the second forest officer to the State Pine Plantation in the 1920s. A residence was built in Dandenong Road for him and his daughter by the Victorian Forest Commission. This house still exists. The last officer in charge of the State Pine Plantation was Harry Firth who lasted until 1956.

=== The Pines ===
Frankston North was originally named Pines Forest because the area was a government pine plantation before becoming a government housing estate and the area still carries that name. The area became known as "The Pines" as an abbreviation of the name of the suburb and is still known by that name today. The Ministry of Housing established the "Pines Forest Estate" in the 1950s which made up the bulk of the suburb. In order to pay homage to the name, Pines have been planted across the suburb during 2016–2017.

Houses are a mixture of low scale dwellings set in gardens. The street-scape is generally open due to the low horizontal building forms and low or open style fencing. The homes were predominantly constructed in the 1960s-1970s by the Housing Commission of Victoria. Most homes were constructed as single story, brick veneer with cement tiled roofs. Some homes were constructed from conite, predominantly in the western, older sections of the precinct. Sealed roads have kerbs and footpaths on both sides of the street. Trees are mainly native Australian trees, such as Eucalyptus, medium to large in size and planted irregularly in streets. The approximate size of Frankston North is 5.2 square kilometres (2.0 sq mi).

The first stage of the housing in Pines Forest was completed in 1957 and Pines Forest Post Office opened on 12 October 1959, and closed in 1980. The Pines Forest Post Office is now run as a private business in the Pines Forest shopping strip on the corner of Forest Drive and Mahogany Boulevard.

The first streets constructed were in the south of the area. The names of the streets alluded to the species of pines planted in the plantation: The first street constructed was Pine Street, followed by Plantation Street and Forest Drive. The various pine species reflected in street names are Monterey, Radiata, Corsican, Aleppo, Norfolk, and Excelsior (Excelsa). Many other streets in Frankston North are named after exotic and native species. Several species of flowering eucalyptus were planted in the street verges. Excelsior Drive was the northern boundary.

In 1965, the second wave and eventual completion of the building program began east of Excelsior Drive and extended as far as the proposed Mornington Peninsula Freeway to the east. The freeway zone acted as a buffer between the houses and the Frankston Municipal tip.

==== Fires ====
During 1955, a fire destroyed a large part of the plantation. Another fire would threaten the housing estate later in the century during 1999. In 1956, 120 hectares (296 acres) were excised from the reserved area to allow the Housing Commission to build houses for low-income families.

=== 1970s and 1980s ===
"The Pines" had a reputation during the 1970s and 1980s for being a "high crime" suburb. Leader Community Newspapers records show that car theft, assaults, vandalism and drug-related crime were commonplace. There was continual rivalry and fighting between pupils of Monterey Technical and High schools. It was commonplace to witness on-field violence at home games of the 'Pines Football Club'.

East Ward councilor Jane Hill said that there was "No reason for (the) Pines stigma" and said that its reputation existed only in the minds of a minority of Frankston residents.

Community action during 1980 prevented a proposal to subdivide the Pines Flora and Fauna Reserve. Unions supported the stance against the plan which was developed in the 1970s

=== Changes in The Pines' reputation ===
Monterey Boulevard, a major thoroughfare which travels from west to east through the centre of the suburb used to be a well-known illegal street drag racing location until traffic chicanes were installed in 1993. There are now speed humps and roundabouts throughout the estate and a local Hoon hotline has been established.

During the 1990s, many state-owned homes were sold to the inhabitants as private homes, particularly within the eastern quarter. This led to better maintenance and presentation as homeowners renovated.

== Education ==
=== Frankston North Community Centre ===
In 1983, the City of Frankston purchased a former Ministry of Housing rent office at 2 Candlebark Crescent Pines Forest. This served as the community centre for some years before a new building was established in Mahogany Avenue Pines Forest and was later named the Mahogany Neighbourhood Centre before more recently becoming The Frankston North Community Centre. The Candlebark site became an office for a local not for profit legal centre and has since been demolished along with the neighbouring early childhood centre.

=== Former Monterey High School site ===
In 1993, the decision was taken to merge Monterey High School and Monterey Technical School to reduce the administrative costs of running two schools. Monterey Secondary College was formed and was based at the previous Technical school site on Silvertop Street. The High school campus was deconstructed, in preparation for development of the site situated on the corner of Monterey Boulevard and Forest Drive.

The ex-high school site was earmarked for several public works projects including its use as public land – as either park space or sports reserve. None eventuated, and instead, the site was sold to a developer by the Kennett Liberal government while it lay dormant and decomposed. The Bracks Labor Government later compulsorily re-purchased the land and offered it for free to the City of Frankston. Asbestos was found at the site during the early 1990s when residents embarked on a community cleanup program until a committee of management was established by the council. An asbestos removal program, to commence in 1996, never materialised.

A petition, signed by 1,879 residents of Carrum Downs and presented to the Victorian Legislative Assembly in 1997 further sought action to begin "construction of suitable facilities in Carrum Downs with the view of relocating Monterey Secondary College from its present location in Frankston North". The action, intended to secure educational facilities in Carrum Downs, an adjoining suburb, was unsuccessful.

A Public Sector Investment Program estimated the site to be worth $1m during 2000–01. The money to purchase the site was to be sourced from the sale of proceeds from surplus properties by the Department of Treasury and Finance but again never eventuated.

As of 2006 this former site, now known as Monterey Community Park had a skate park and playground added with a toilet block and walking/cycle track also now in place. There are current plans for a village green type area to be built including a shaded performance area and further pathways. These works are reported to be completed by February 2010 and will be utilised at that time for Pines Pride Day, an annual event now held on the site.

== Population and housing ==
2011 Census of Population and Housing data collected by the Australian Bureau of Statistics states that 5,626 persons lived in Frankston North as at 2011. Of these, some 4,594 were aged 15 years or over and 3,945 were born in Australia.

The median age of the population is 39. Households have a median monthly housing loan repayment of $1,180 and On average, each household consists of 2.4 people. The median weekly rent is $225. The median weekly individual income is $382, compared to a median weekly family income of $889 and a median weekly household income of $760.

== Pines Flora and Fauna Reserve ==
The Pines Flora and Fauna Reserve is a 108 hectare reserve which contains a significant remnant of bushland from the Mornington Peninsula. Access is via walking tracks on Tamarisk Drive, Excelsior Drive and Warrawee Circuit.

The reserve is considered ideal for recreation activities such as nature study, photography and walking. Trig Point contains expansive views of the reserve, Port Phillip Bay and the Dandenong Ranges. A network of tracks allows visitors to walk to most features of the reserve.

Very little is known of Aboriginal activity in the area other than the use of the springs as a source of fresh water by the Bunurong people. A proposal in the 1970s to sand mine the remaining bushland met with community uproar and the Eureka Flag was raised on Trig Point (the site from which the Frankston area was originally surveyed) and the area claimed for the people of Frankston.

The reserve is a very important habitat for native fauna, particularly small mammals, reptiles and amphibians. Southern brown bandicoots, swamp wallabies, echidnas, and brushtail and ringtail possums are present but are often hard to find as they are not all active during the day. The reserve is also a potential habitat for the endangered New Holland mouse.

Over 100 bird species have been recorded including honeyeaters, waterbirds, birds of prey and parrots. A number of significant species have been recorded including the painted button quail, brush bronzewing, Latham's snipe and swift parrot.

Much of the vegetation of the reserve is remnant heathland with silver-leaf stringybark and black sheoak. It is still in a reasonable natural condition and contains many species of plants now rare on the Mornington Peninsula. Native orchids are a highlight of the many wildflowers that mainly bloom in spring. Rabbit ears orchid, dwarf greenhood orchid and the not so common common spider orchid (Dendrobium tetragonum) are some of the orchids to be found among the 170 or more plant species recorded.

In January 2018, the Carrum Downs Bushfire broke out in the Carrum Downs side of the reserve.

== Sports ==
=== Frankston Pines Football Club ===
Frankston Pines (Association) Football Club, known as The Pines, are a local association football club based at Monterey Reserve. Formed in 1965 by Scottish Australians, the club has failed to reach the Victorian Premier League since being relegated in 2008. Since then, the club plummeted down to the provisional leagues, below the State League Division 3. The club was in huge trouble with a big financial debt on its back and was close to winding up. However, the club was promoted in 2012 and thereafter achieved two more successive promotions by 2014.

=== Pines Australian Rules Football Club ===
Pines Australian Rules Football club, known as The Pythons, are a renowned local football team with their homeground based at Eric Bell Reserve, more commonly known to locals and rival teams as the "Snakepit".

The strength of the club's ties can be traced to its origins. The club was formed in 1964, not long after the establishment of a housing commission estate in Pines Forest/Frankston North. The club experienced several lean years in which it struggled to win a game before local juniors began graduating into the senior team. In fact in its early years it was the junior sides that helped establish the club's success. In 1967, the club's under 12 team was the first side to represent the Pines Football club in a grand final. As young players graduated through its ranks the football club began winning premierships in all competition levels including 3 consecutive flags between 1968 and 1970 via its under-15 side.

On the estate of some 2000 houses, with several players in most of them, the football club improved when local teenagers began making their mark. Barry Burke, the father of St Kilda midfielder Nathan Burke, moulded the team into a premiership unit.

Pines football club also produced several VFL/AFL players, most notably Russell Greene (Hawthorn & St Kilda), Brendon Moore, Steve Newman and Kevin Taylor (St. Kilda fc).

=== Pines Forest Swimming Centre ===
Frankston North is home to a 50-metre heated outdoor six-lane swimming pool. The Swimming Centre contains a giant waterslide and slide pool, which is visible from adjoining Forest Drive. The centre also contains a Toddlers pool, barbecue facilities and half-court basketball area. Operated by Frankston City Council, the centre is used by schools from surrounding suburbs for sports and recreational activities.

== Rotary Club of Frankston North ==
Due to the population of the City of Frankston increasing rapidly in the late 1960s and the early 1970s, a local chapter of the club was established for Frankston North in March 1973 The meeting unanimously resolved that a new Club should be formed and that it should be known as the Rotary Club of Frankston North. In accordance with Rotary requirements, territorial limits were set, and these limits, as described in the 'Intention to Cede' papers proposed by the Rotary Club of Frankston, were accepted by the new Club.

== The Pines Cultural Mapping Project ==
During 2003 an extensive Cultural Mapping exercise was developed in collaboration with the community of North Frankston. The exercise focused on the implementation of six significant community art projects.

The project is funded by the Victorian government's Department of Human Services and the City of Frankston. Support was also provided by the Mahogany Neighbourhood Centre, Monterey Secondary College and local service providers and businesses.

The project included the development of art designations for The Pines Gateways, such as banners and markers and mosaic pavers for the Pines Parks entrances and exits.

Proposals were developed for the future development of the Monterey High School site within the precinct and other ideas that were relevant to the community. Six community art projects were developed between January 2002 to May 2003.

== Social and political conditions ==
Local government

Frankston North is classified as part of the North West Ward of the City of Frankston, which also covers Seaford and parts of Frankston. The North West ward and two other multi-councillor wards were created before the 2005 elections, held on 26 November 2005, replacing the previous single-councillor wards.

Frankston North Community Group

The Frankston North Community Group is a political lobby group that aims to represent the needs and requirements of Frankston North residents at council meetings and through official channels. A number of community projects have been a product of the Frankston North Community Group. All locals are encouraged to attend the meetings held once a month at the Frankston Forest Baptist Church on Monterey Boulevard. Special guests are often in attendance such as councilors, members of parliament and local business people.

Frankston North Community Map

The Frankston North Community Map was launched by Jude Perera, MP for Cranbourne on 20 June 2006. The map was a result of community collaboration and visually displays services and amenities available to Frankston North residents. The map, which are available from local businesses and shops, were designed by a professional designer and includes information regarding services such as medical centres, child health centres and schools.

== Community Renewal Frankston North ==
This program is funded by the state government and there are currently eight community renewal sites around the state, of which one is Frankston North, the project team for this site are project manager, Tricia Folvig and project officer, Orma Ringberg, who are located at the Mahogany Centre.

A consumer credit report by Dun & Bradstreet published in 2009 showed that, of all Australian suburbs, Frankston North has citizens most at risk of defaulting on bills and loans.

== Public facilities and transport ==
- Frankston North has no direct access to rail services but is serviced by two bus lines which run through the suburb via the Frankston-Dandenong route.
- The Peninsula Legal Centre was originally based at Frankston North and was known as 'The Frankston North Legal Centre'. Pro bono advice services are provided by the Law Institute of Victoria as part of the program to support Community Legal Centre's with legal advice. Some 20 staff and over 100 volunteers support this "Outreach" program.
- Frankston North is also served by local branches of Alcoholics Anonymous and The Salvation Army.
- Frankston North is home to several places of worship including The Salvation Army on Forest Drive, Frankston Presbyterian Church on Radiata Street, St Johns Anglican Church on Monterey Boulevard and the Catholic Archdiocese Church Holy Family on Moreton Street.
- Frankston North is home to two retail shopping strips: one at the Western end of Excelsior Drive known as the Excelsior shops, and another on Mahogany Avenue known as The Pines Forest Shopping Centre. Between them, residents have access to the services of a Licensed Post Office, supermarkets, milk bars, dry cleaning service, chemist and food outlets including Chinese, fish and chips and green grocers.
- There are three schools remaining in The Pines, from six in the mid-1970s. These are the new Mahogany Rise Primary School which is the result of combining Pines Forest Primary School (originally Frankston Forest Primary) and Monterey Primary on the Monterey Primary site, Aldercourt Primary School and Monterey Secondary College. St Anthony's Coptic Orthodox College, originally the site of Armarta Primary School (opened late 1960s), closed in 2013 and was demolished the following year.
- Frankston North-The Pines was serviced by Neighbourhood Watch which was broken up by five separate areas each with its own Co-ordinator and their Zone Representatives within a Committee consisting of a Newsletter Editor, Secretary, Treasurer and an Overall Coordinator/President. After 2010 Neighbourhood Watch and Police structure changed.

The areas were known as FRK 22, FRK 23, FRK 24, FRK 25, FRK 26 and are bound by Frankston-Dandenong Road, Pines Flora & Fauna Reserve, Ballarto Rd and Peninsula Country Golf Club. Meetings to discuss safety issues were held on the third Wednesday of the month, 4.00pm – 6.00pm, except for December and January, at 26 Mahogany Avenue- Mahogany Neighbourhood Centre, (unless otherwise advised in the monthly newsletter). All of the community was invited to attend. Currently information of community interest may be found on the Neighbourhood Watch Frankston North, Facebook Page.

== Notable residents ==
- Bruce Billson, attended Monterey High School, located in the suburb
- Nathan Burke, a former Australian rules football player, lived in the suburb

== See also ==
- City of Frankston (former) – Frankston North was previously within this former local government area
