= Climate-friendly school =

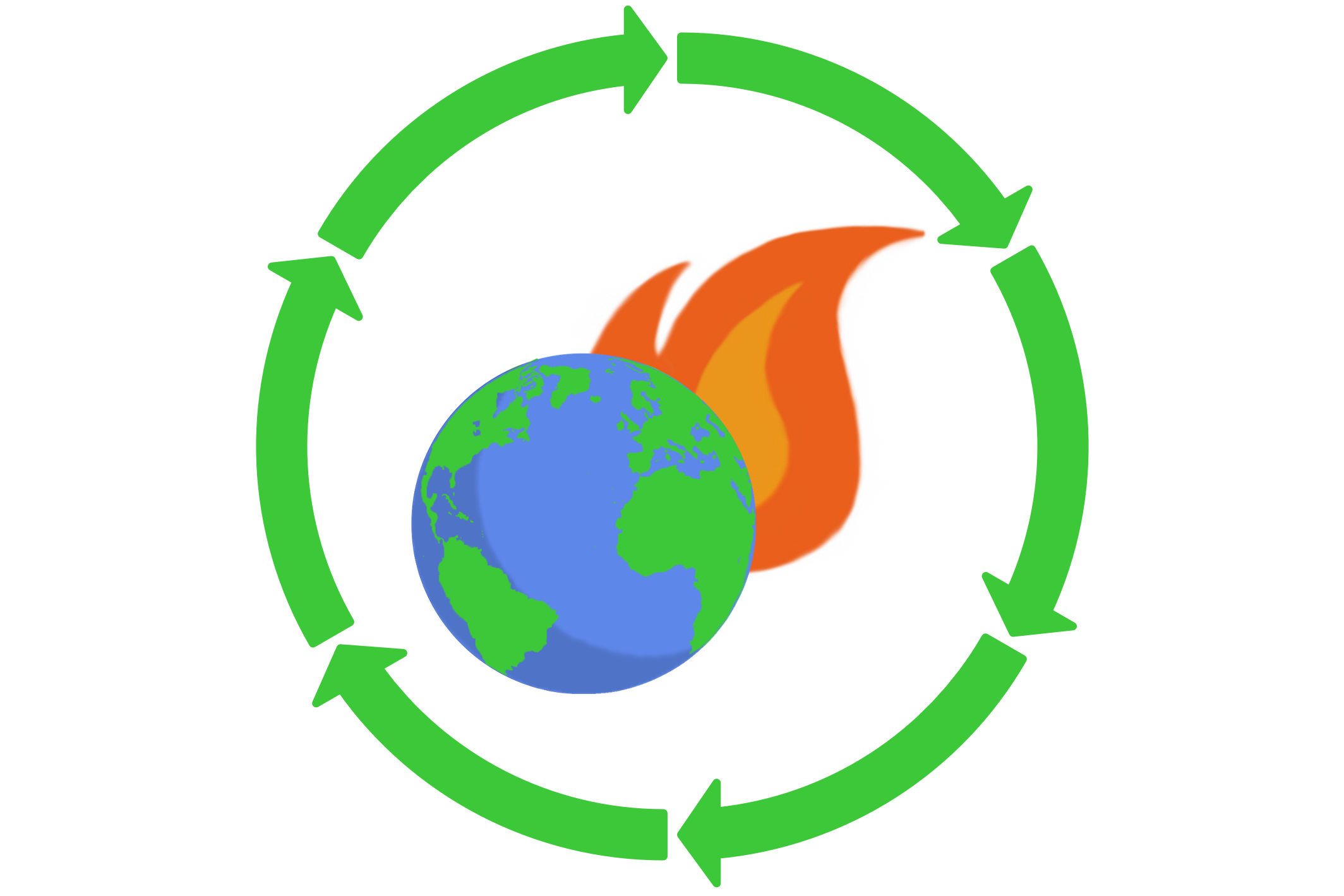
Climate change adaption icon

A climate-friendly school, or eco-school, encourages the education of sustainable developments, especially by reducing the amount of carbon dioxide produced in order to decrease the effects of climate change. The term "climate-friendly school" arose and was promoted by the United Nations' education for sustainable development program (ESD).

The scientific consensus on the warming of the climate system and growing public concern about its effects, as well as the increased international commitments by countries to reduce global emissions, have accelerated investment into climate-friendly technologies in recent years.

== Climate-friendly initiatives ==
International initiatives such as the United Nations' education for sustainable development program (ESD), supported by the Foundation for Environmental Education eco-schools program and the UNEP's global universities partnership on environment and sustainability have led the development of climate-friendly schools. In order to minimise the production of carbon dioxide, these initiatives have encouraged the calculation and reduction of carbon footprints, the reduction of waste (through composting, purchasing policies, litter-less lunches), alternative transport options and increased education of climate change issues.

=== Education for sustainable development (ESD) ===
The education for sustainable development (ESD) was developed through broad consultations with stakeholders from 2016 to 2018 with the aim of contributing to the achievement of 17 sustainable development goals. The United Nations introduced a "whole-school" approach, surrounding a situation where students learn about climate change is further improved by formal and informal messages promoted by the school's values and actions. The "whole-school" approach to climate change means that an educational institution encourages action for reducing climate change in every aspect of school life. This includes school governance, teaching content and methodology, campus and facilities management as well as cooperation with partners and the broader communities. This actively involves all internal and external school stakeholders, namely students, teachers, principals, school staff at all levels and the wider school community such as families and community members in reflecting and acting on climate change is key to a whole-school approach.

=== Eco-schools ===
The eco-schools program was developed in 1994 with the support of the European Commission and identified as model initiative for the ESD program by the United Nations. The aim of the program is to promote sustainable development issues in schools through the introduction of a seven-step methodology and eleven-subject theme encouragement.

=== Global Universities Partnership on Environment and Sustainability ===
The global universities partnership on environment and sustainability was launched in 2012 at the UNEP in Shanghai, China. In accordance with the ESD program it aims to increase the mainstreaming of sustainability practises and education into universities worldwide. The program pays special attention to enabling individual transformation, societal transformation and technological advancement.

== Climate-friendly schools ==
According to a UNESCO report, the following schools situated around the world have implemented the system of a "climate-friendly school", with respect to climate agreements.

=== Greece ===
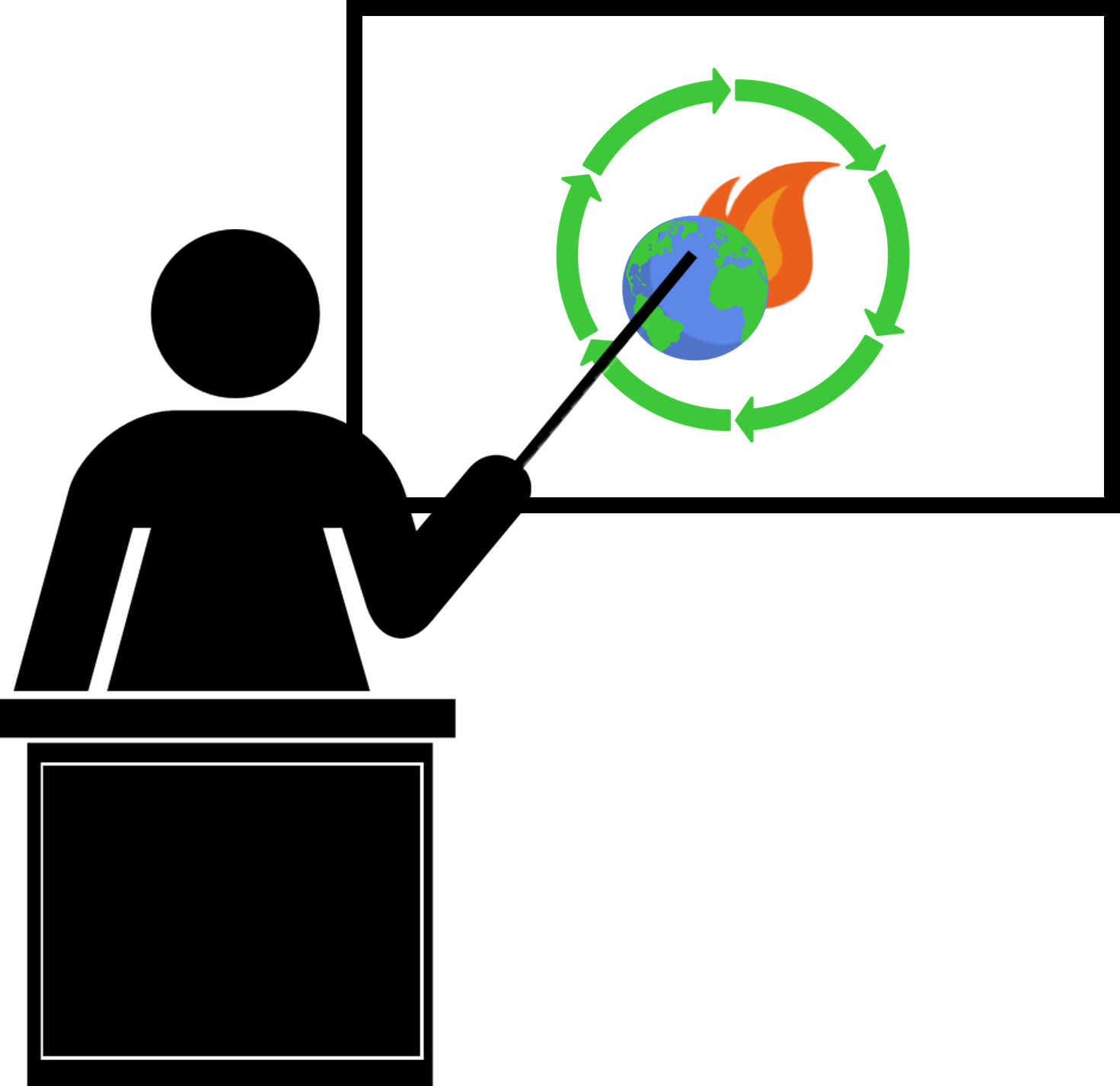
Teaching climate change adaption icon

As an experimental school, the Athens-Gennadeio in Greece was encouraged to introduce innovative programmes. In 2013, the school introduced systems into biology and chemistry courses for 157 senior secondary students. In this systems unit, students worked in groups to investigate climate change, virus transmission, and ecosystem dynamics with the help of computer simulations. Through their investigations, students discovered the properties of complex systems, such as positive and negative feedback loops. A group of students measured the energy sustainability of the school building, to find its weaknesses and construct an action plan to improve it.

=== Lebanon ===
The Al-Kawthar Secondary School in Beirut, Lebanon works to raise awareness of climate change within their school. So far, 2,421 students, 310 teachers, and 110 families have been involved in projects including tree-planting, making handicrafts from recycled materials, visiting national forests, recycling, and conserving water. The school also hosted film nights and workshops where students, families and teachers suggested ways to save the planet. Following the ISO-26000 guidelines for socially responsible institutions, the school has committed to a continuous process of improvement. At the beginning of the school year, the environmental committee develops an action plan based on what was learned and achieved the previous year. The committee keeps a record of their activities, so the school can identify high-impact activities and activities that could be scaled up. Teachers and students deepen their learning by sharing their experiences with other schools in Lebanon and around the world.

=== Côte d'Ivoire ===
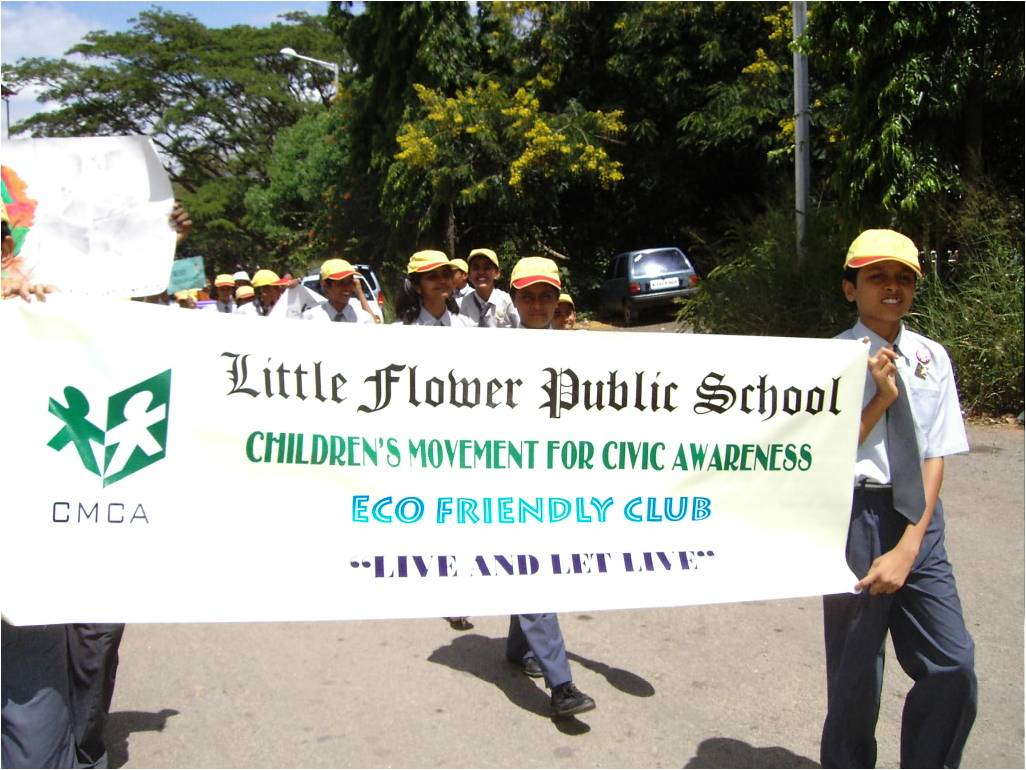
Children's movement for civic awareness

In Côte d'Ivoire, ASPnet schools implemented initiatives, with the consultation university researchers and medical practitioners, that aimed to preserve the biodiversity of forests. The biodiversity of forests was acknowledged to be under threat due to the widespread uses of forest resources as a culturally important practise in traditional medicine. The schools promote visits to botanical gardens where parents and traditional medicine practitioners teach students about traditional medicinal plant cultivation and methods of sustainable conservation. In collaboration with the experts and researchers, the ASPnet schools are now considering creating a genebank as well as replanting endangered species.

=== Brazil ===
In Rio de Janeiro in Brazil, the Colégio Israelita Brasileiro A. Liessen's environment team has developed initiatives to teach janitors, teachers, students and engineers about sustainable practices in experiential, non-formal learning activities. The team built a green roof, solar ovens, bamboo bicycle racks and planted spices, flowers, and meditation gardens that could be converted into biodiesel cooking oils. The team has also offered trainings for school community members in order to secure buy-ins for the projects. For example, training on waste sorting and cooking oil collection was offered to employees and a gardening workshop was organized for student volunteers, so they could assist maintenance staff in caring for the expanding school gardens.

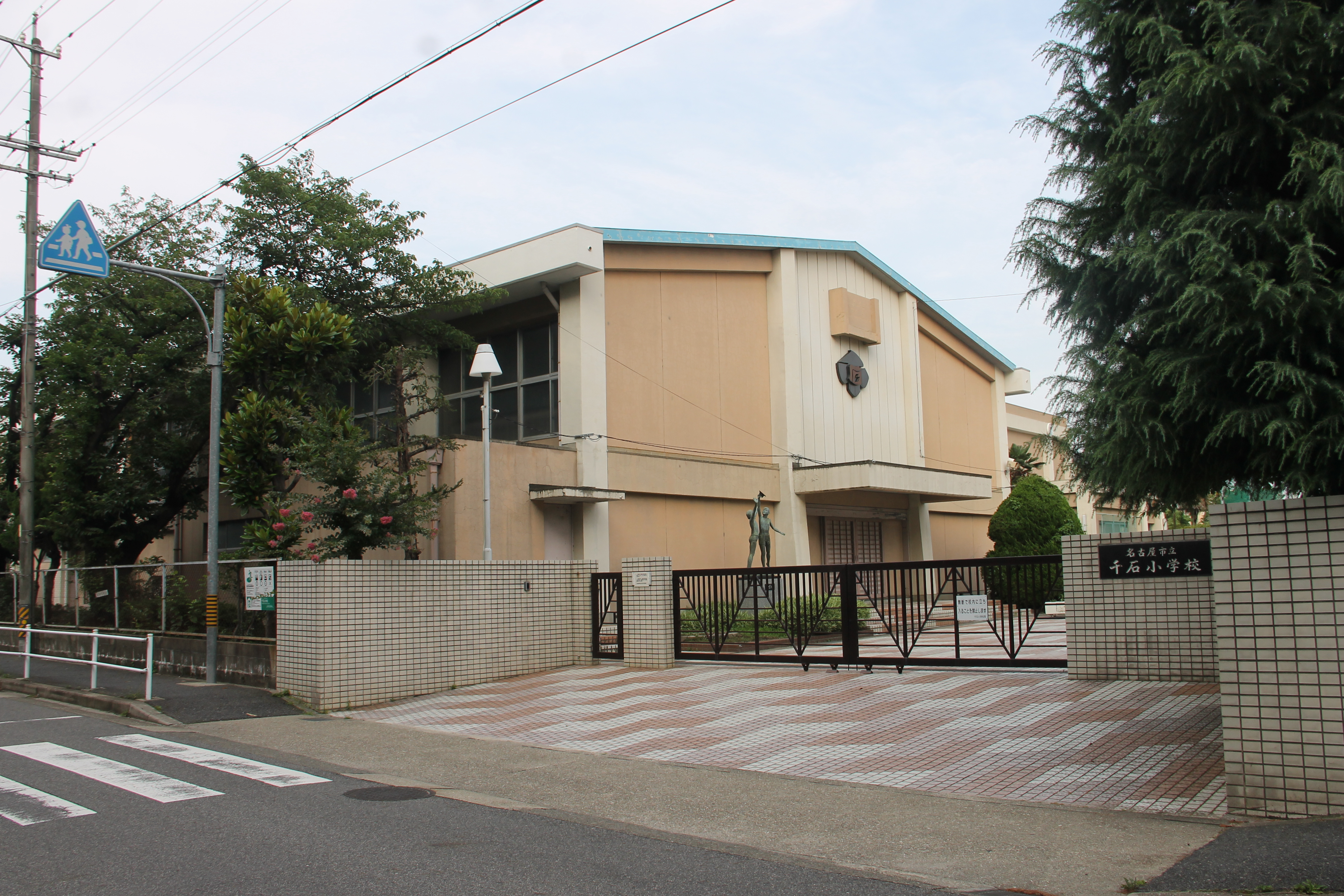
Nagoya City Sengoku Elementary School

=== Japan ===
The Nagoya International School in Japan is committed to developing a school culture of sustainability, as expressed in their school mission statement. The institution aims to "nurture in its students the capacity to objectively define what is truly needed in the global society, to take action on their own, and to become active agents for sustainable development."

== See also ==
- UNESCO ASPnet
- Education for sustainable development
- Global Citizenship Education
- Climate Change Education (CCE)

== Sources ==
This article incorporates text from a free content work. Licensed under CC-BY-SA IGO 3.0 (license statement/permission). Text taken from Getting Climate Ready: A Guide for Schools on Climate Action, 5, 7-8, 10, 15, 18-19, Gibb, Natalie, UNESCO. UNESCO.
