= Futures of Education =

UNESCO global initiative

Futures of Education is a global initiative, launched in 2019, and led by UNESCO (United Nation Educational, Scientific and Cultural Organization), which aims to rethink and shape the future of education. The project's stated goal is to mobilize collective intelligence, generate debate and reimagine how education can contribute to the common good of humanity.

== Context ==
UNESCO argues that due to accelerated climate change, the fragility of Earth is becoming more apparent and that inequalities, social fragmentation, and political extremism are bringing many societies to a point of crisis. It argues that advances in digital communication, artificial intelligence, and biotechnology have potential but raise ethical and governance concerns, especially as innovation and technological change have an uneven record of contributing to human development.

== UNESCO's initiative ==
UNESCO's Futures of Education initiative is intended to mobilize the many ways of being and knowing to leverage humanity's collective intelligence. It relies on a consultative process that involves young people, educators, civil society, governments, business and other stakeholders. The mobilization and contribution of the network of UNITWIN/UNESCO chairs is a key part of the process of engagement. The work was guided by an international commission of leaders from diverse fields and different regions of the world. The commission published a report on its findings in 2021 titled Reimagining our futures together: A new social contract for education.

== See also ==
- Education for sustainable development
- Global citizenship education
- Sustainable development

== Sources ==
- This article incorporates text from a free content work. Licensed under CC BY-SA 3.0 IGO. Text taken from Humanistic futures of learning: perspectives from UNESCO Chairs and UNITWIN Networks, UNESCO.
- This article incorporates text from a free content work. Licensed under CC BY-SA 3.0 IGO. Text taken from #CommitToEducation, UNESCO.
- This article incorporates text from a free content work. Licensed under CC BY-SA 3.0 IGO. Text taken from Reimagining our futures together: a new social contract for education, 188, International Commission on the Futures of Education, UNESCO. https://unesdoc.unesco.org.
