= Bruce Billson =

Australian politician (born 1966)

The Honourable Bruce Billson
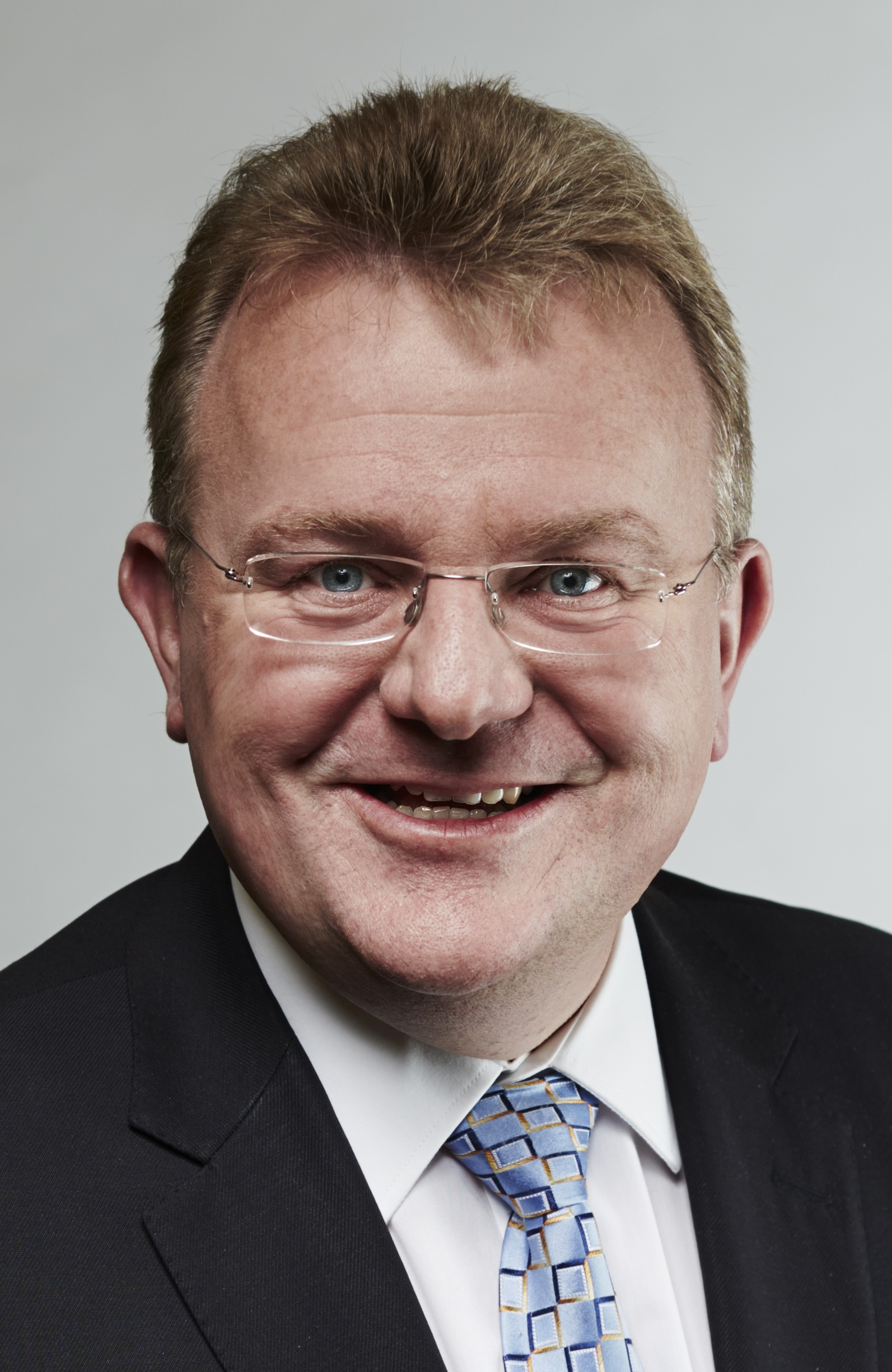
- Official portrait, 2014

Minister for Small Business
- In office 18 September 2013 – 21 September 2015
- Prime Minister: Tony Abbott; Malcolm Turnbull
- Preceded by: Gary Gray
- Succeeded by: Kelly O'Dwyer

Minister for Veterans' Affairs
- In office 27 January 2006 – 3 December 2007
- Prime Minister: John Howard
- Preceded by: De-Anne Kelly
- Succeeded by: Alan Griffin

Member of the Australian Parliament for Dunkley
- In office 2 March 1996 – 9 May 2016
- Preceded by: Bob Chynoweth
- Succeeded by: Chris Crewther

Personal details
- Born: Bruce Fredrick Billson; 26 January 1966 (age 60) Albury, New South Wales, Australia
- Party: Liberal Party of Australia
- Spouse: Kate Ranken
- Children: 4
- Education: RMIT University
- Occupation: Australian Small Business and Family Enterprise Ombudsman
- Website: www.asbfeo.gov.au

Bruce Fredrick Billson (born 26 January 1966) is an Australian former politician. A member of the Liberal Party, he was a member of the House of Representatives for Dunkley, a Melbourne seat, from 1996 to 2016 and held ministerial office in the Howard, Abbott and Turnbull governments as Minister for Veterans' Affairs (2007) and Minister for Small Business (2013–2015).

Billson is a founding Director of Judo Bank and has held various board appointments, including the Franchise Council of Australia, the Institute of Public Accountants/Deakin University SME Research Centre and Australian Property Institute. He was the director-small business and enterprise at Deakin University Business School and has also owned and operated several small businesses. He was appointed as the Australian Small Business and Family Enterprise Ombudsman in 2021.

== Early life and education ==
Billson was born in Albury, New South Wales, and moved to Seaford, Victoria as a child. He was educated at Monterey High School in Frankston North and has a Master of Business Leadership, Graduate Diploma of Business Management and Bachelor of Business Degree from the Royal Melbourne Institute of Technology University. He is a Graduate of the Australian Institute of Company Directors company directors course.

He was Acting Chief Executive and Manager of Corporate Development for the Shire of Hastings, a ministerial adviser to the Victorian Minister for Natural Resources, and policy adviser to the Shadow Minister for the Environment, Senator Rod Kemp, before entering politics.

== Career ==
=== Ministerial roles ===
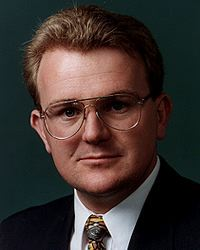
Billson shortly after his election to Parliament.

Billson was appointed the Parliamentary Secretary to the Minister for Foreign Affairs in 2004. In 2005, he was also appointed Parliamentary Secretary to the Minister for Immigration and Multicultural and Indigenous Affairs, and in 2006, he was promoted to Minister for Veterans' Affairs/Minister Assisting the Minister for Defence – positions he retained until the defeat of the Howard government in the 2007 federal election.

In 2007, he was appointed Shadow Minister for Broadband, Communications and the Digital Economy. In 2009, he was then appointed the Shadow Minister for Sustainable Development and Cities and after the 2010 election he was appointed Shadow Minister for Small Business, Competition Policy and Consumer Affairs.

Following the 2013 election he was sworn into the cabinet as the Minister for Small Business (including responsibility for competition policy and consumer affairs).

=== Retirement from politics ===
Following the leadership spill that saw Malcolm Turnbull become Prime Minister, Billson was dropped from the new Ministry upon the ascension of the Turnbull government. On 24 November 2015, he announced he would retire from politics at the 2016 federal election. On 22 March 2016, it was announced that he would serve as the executive chairman of the Franchise Council of Australia (FCA).

In August 2017, Billson admitted he had received a salary from the FCA several months before his retirement, which he had not declared on the register of members' interests. Billson apologised to the Clerk of the House for the omission, but claimed his directorship was not concealed and there was no conflict of interest.

He was cleared of breaching ministerial guidelines by the Secretary of the Department of Prime Minister and Cabinet, Martin Parkinson, who found there was “no reason to conclude Mr Billson has breached either the Statement of Ministerial Standards or the Lobbying Code of Conduct”. The issue was also referred to an inquiry conducted by the House of Representatives' Standing Committee of Privileges and Members' Interests which concluded “it (had) received no clear evidence that Mr Billson had been improperly influenced in the performance of his duties as a Member…and that no finding of contempt could be made”. It recommended in March 2018 that Billson be censured for failing to disclose receiving a salary for the FCA, and for undertaking work for the organisation through his consultancy business before leaving parliament. The Committee's report stated that Billson's "decision to accept the role with FCA while he was a member falls below the standards expected of a member of the house". On 27 March the House of Representatives passed a motion censuring Billson.

Beginning 11 March 2021 he took up a government role as the Australian Small Business and Family Enterprise Ombudsman, replacing Kate Carnell. The news site Crikey noted that the role of Small Business Ombudsman had been initially created by Billson while he was the Minister for Small Business.

=== Board roles ===
- Executive Chair – Franchise Council of Australia
- Independent Non Executive Director – Judo Capital
- Chair/independent Non Executive Director - Australian Property Institute
- Director - Small Business Enterprise, Business & Law School, Deakin University
- Chair/director - Growth & Development, BDC Partners
- Independent Director - Plumbing Industry Climate Action Centre
- Past President - Committee for Mornington Peninsula
- Independent Director - South East Melbourne Inc (NFP regional organisation of seven councils)
- Administrator - City of Whittlesea
- Trustee - SkillsPlus Youth Foundation

== Personal life ==
Previously married to Tina Papakos (from 1994 to 2001), Billson has been married to Kate (née Ranken) since 2002. He has four children, including two from his previous marriage.

Parliament of Australia
Preceded by Bob Chynoweth	Member for Dunkley; 1996–2016	Succeeded by Chris Crewther
Political offices
Preceded by Gary Gray	Minister for Small Business; 2013–2015	Succeeded by Kelly O'Dwyer
Preceded by De-Anne Kelly	Minister for Veterans' Affairs; 2007	Succeeded by Alan Griffin
