= Global citizenship education =

Form of civic learning

Global citizenship education (GCED) is a form of civic learning that involves students' active participation in projects that address global issues of a social, political, economic, or environmental nature. The two main elements of GCE are 'global consciousness'; the moral or ethical aspect of global issues, and 'global competencies', or skills meant to enable learners to participate in changing and developing the world. The promotion of GCE was a response by governments and NGOs to the emergence of supranational institution, regional economic blocs, and the development of information and communications technologies. These have all resulted in the emergence of a more globally oriented and collaborative approach to education. GCE addresses themes such as peace and human rights, intercultural understanding, citizenship education, respect for diversity and tolerance, and inclusiveness.

GCE provides the overall lens which views the role of education in the promotion of the rule of law (RoL). It draws upon experience from other education processes, including human rights education, peace education, education for sustainable development, education for international and intercultural understanding. GCE aims to empower learners to engage and assume active roles, both locally and globally, as proactive contributors to a more just, peaceful, tolerant, inclusive, secure and sustainable world. GCE aspires to be a transformative experience, to give learners the opportunities and competencies to realize their rights and obligations to promote a better world and future. GCE is built on a lifelong learning perspective. It is not only for children and youth but also for adults. It can be delivered in formal, non-formal and informal settings. For this reason, GCE is part and parcel of the Sustainable Development Goal 4 on Education (SDG4, Target 4.7). GCE is also a component of the single indicator for Target 12.8 in Sustainable Development Goal 12 for "responsible consumption and production".

== Definition and origins ==
The Global Citizenship Foundation defines Global citizenship education as "a transformative, lifelong pursuit that involves both curricular learning and practical experience to shape a mindset to care for humanity and the planet, and to equip individuals with global competence to undertake responsible actions aimed at forging more just, peaceful, secure, sustainable, tolerant and inclusive societies."

Global citizenship consists of voluntary practices oriented to human rights, social justice, and environmentalism at the local, regional, and global level. Unlike national citizenship, global citizenship does not denote any legal status or allegiance to an actual form of government. The emergence of regional economic blocs, supra-national political institutions such as the European Union, and the advancement of ICTs, has caused governments to try to prepare national populations to be competitive in the global jobs market. This has led to the introduction of global citizenship education programs at primary, secondary, and tertiary level, but also at independent NGOs, grass roots organizations, and other large scale educational organizations, such as the International Baccalaureate Organization and UNESCO.

The most important features of global citizenship education are voluntary action that can extend from local to international collectives; the practice of cultural empathy; and a focus on active participation in social and political life at the local and global level. In the late 1990s, OXFAM UK designed a curriculum for global citizenship education which stressed "the 'active' role of global citizens".In this approach, individuals and groups both inside and outside the educational sector might take action that addresses human rights, trade, poverty, health, and environmental issues, for example. This is sometimes called the 'global consciousness' aspect of GCE. However, organizations such as UNESCO have also begun to emphasize 'global competencies', including science and technology into their GCE curricula.

== Emergence and development ==
In the present era of globalization, the recognition of global interdependence on the part of the general public has led to a higher degree of interest in global citizenship in education. Though modern schooling may have been oriented to education suitable for the nation-state throughout the 19th and 20th centuries, in the 21st century, citizenship is understood in global terms, so that schooling might improve individual nations' global competitiveness. Many universities worldwide have responded to the need for a globally oriented education by sending their students to study abroad in increasing numbers, and some have announced that this will soon become a mandatory degree requirement.

Many governments also now promote GCE for the cohesion of society. The large numbers of people migrating across national borders means that the diversity of ethnic, religious, and linguistic groups, "has raised [...] complex and difficult questions about citizenship, human rights, democracy, and education". In addition, global issues related to sustainability, such as the world's future energy arrangements, have also been incorporated into the domain of global citizenship education.

== Competences ==
While GCE can take different forms, it has some common elements, which include fostering in learners the following competences:

- An attitude supported by an understanding of multiple levels of identity, and the potential for a collective identity that transcends individual cultural, religious, ethnic or other differences (such as a sense of belongingness to common humanity, and respect for diversity);
- A deep knowledge of global issues and universal values such as justice, equality, dignity and respect (such as understanding of the process of globalization, interdependence/ interconnectedness, the global challenges which cannot be adequately or uniquely addressed by nation states, sustainability as the main concept of the future);
- Cognitive skills to think critically, systemically and creatively, including adopting a multi-perspective approach that recognizes different dimensions, perspectives and angles of issues (such as reasoning and problem-solving skills supported by a multi-perspective approach);
- Non-cognitive skills, including social skills such as empathy and conflict resolution, and communication skills and aptitudes for networking and interacting with people of different backgrounds, origins, cultures and perspectives (such as global empathy, sense of solidarity); and
- Behavioural capacities to act collaboratively and responsibly to find global solutions to global challenges, and to strive for the collective good.

The development of these competencies increasingly relies on innovative teaching strategies. For example, "interactive, digital learning environments that merge academic literacies with cross-cultural communication skills" can help students engage with global issues in meaningful ways by combining critical thinking with cross-cultural understanding. However, most global citizenship programmes tend to not explicitly link their specific programme activities to their intended programme outcomes, which limits robust outcome assessment of these important education programmes.

== Pedagogy ==
Pedagogy in global citizenship programmes generally follow a student-centred, participatory and collaborative approach. Most educators agree that "global citizenship is a learned and nurtured behavior", and the most widely used classroom strategy for developing global skills is project-based learning. This pedagogical technique can be utilized in the case of almost any school subject, "[and] is the primary pedagogical strategy in the discourse of global competencies. Educators see it as an important method for developing the tools- technical and emotional- for success in the global society". With the aim of nurturing students' potential to be both learners and citizens, the project-based approach has been used successfully in community-based learning, for example.

Another important pedagogical feature of GCE is learning through communicative practices outside the classroom that "harness […] the educational force of the wider culture". If students are encouraged "to see themselves as political agents", educators assume they are more likely to acquire the knowledge, skills and abilities that enable them to become agents of change. Another important element of the student-centered participatory nature of GCED, is that students, through their engagement with others via Social Network Services, create their own forms of global citizenship through dialogue, learning, and action. This is an important element, for example, in the activities of grassroots organizations like 'GIN' (Global Issues Network), and Global Citizenship Foundation which involves students and teachers in projects that address global issues such as human rights, trade rules, and deforestation. Such student-driven, student-led projects combine both the 'global consciousness' and 'global competence' aspects of GCED.

UNESCO developed a competency framework on GCE with key learning outcomes, learner attributes and learning objectives to help guide policymakers and curriculum developers in their efforts to develop national curricula that empower learners to assume active roles, both locally and globally. This competency framework is based on a vision of learning that covers three domains to create a well-rounded learning experience: Cognitive, Socio-Emotional and Behavioural. Although conceptually distinct, these three domains do not represent isolated learning processes; they often overlap, mutually reinforce and build upon each other, and can also occur in parallel. For example, socio-emotional learning (SEL) requires understanding existing challenges in the community (cognitive) and making informed decisions (behaviour). By delivering lessons using all three domains, teachers are more likely to develop the broad range of knowledge, attitudes, values and behaviours that are expected of GCE. This approach also makes it possible to address the four pillars of learning that are key to ensuring learners are equipped with the skills they need to face the world as active and engaged citizens: Learning to know, to do, to be and to live together.

GCED domains of learning and expected learning outcomes

GCE includes three domains of learning, cited below:

- The cognitive domain includes thinking processes that involve the acquisition, organization and use of knowledge and information.
- The socio-emotional domain includes the development of skills that facilitate learners’ emotional welfare and successful interactions with others, including peers, teachers and family members and those in their community.
- The behavioural domain includes the development of the ability to use learned materials or to implement material in new and concrete situations.

GCE has three expected learning outcomes, including how:

- Learners acquire knowledge and understanding of local, national and global issues and the interconnectedness and interdependency of different countries and populations. Learners develop skills for critical thinking and analysis.
- Learners experience a sense of belonging to a common humanity, sharing values and responsibilities, based on human rights. Learners develop attitudes of empathy, solidarity and respect for differences and diversity.
- Learners act effectively and responsibly at local, national and global levels for a more peaceful and sustainable world. Learners develop motivation and willingness to take necessary actions.

'Global consciousness' and 'global competence'

Organizations implementing GCE programs, such as UNESCO, now emphasize the importance of expanding both students' 'global consciousness' and 'global competence'. 'Global consciousness' represents the ethical or moral dimension of global citizenship, whereas 'global competence' "features a blend of the technical-rational and the dispositional or attitudinal".

However, some view global consciousness and global competence as being closely related. The OECD, for instance, focuses on global competencies called 'psychosocial resources', of which there are three main types: "using tools interactively (technology and language skills), interacting in heterogeneous groups (cooperation, empathy), and acting autonomously (realizing one's identity, conducting life plans, defending and asserting rights".

== Key learner attributes ==
GCE identifies three learner attributes, which refer to the traits and qualities that global citizenship education aims to develop in learners and correspond to the key learning outcomes mentioned earlier. These are: informed and critically literate; socially connected and respectful of diversity; ethically responsible and engaged. The three learner attributes draw on a review of the literature and of citizenship education conceptual frameworks, a review of approaches and curricula, as well as technical consultations and recent work by UNESCO on global citizenship education.

=== Informed and critically literate ===
Learners develop their understanding of the world, global themes, governance structures and systems, including politics, history and economics; understand the rights and responsibilities of individuals and groups (for example, women's and children's rights, indigenous rights, corporate social responsibility); and, recognise the interconnectedness of local, national and global issues, structures and processes. Learners develop the skills of critical inquiry (for example, where to find information and how to analyse and use evidence), media literacy and an understanding of how information is mediated and communicated. They develop their ability to inquire into global themes and issues (for example, globalisation, interdependence, migration, peace and conflict, sustainable development) by planning investigations, analysing data and communicating their findings. A key issue is the way in which language is used and, more specifically, how critical literacy is affected by the dominance of the English language and how this influences non-English speakers’ access to information.

=== Socially connected and respectful of diversity ===
Learners learn about their identities and how they are situated within multiple relationships (for example, family, friends, school, local community, country), as a basis for understanding the global dimension of citizenship. They develop an understanding of difference and diversity (for example, culture, language, gender, sexuality, religion), of how beliefs and values influence people's views about those who are different, and of the reasons for, and impact of, inequality and discrimination. Learners also consider common factors that transcend difference, and develop the knowledge, skills, values and attitudes required for respecting difference and living with others.

=== Ethically responsible and engaged ===
Learners explore their own beliefs and values and those of others. They understand how beliefs and values inform social and political decision-making at local, national, regional and global levels, and the challenges for governance of contrasting and conflicting beliefs and values. Learners also develop their understanding of social justice issues in local, national, regional and global contexts and how these are interconnected. Ethical issues (for example, relating to climate change, consumerism, economic globalisation, fair trade, migration, poverty and wealth, sustainable development, terrorism, war) are also addressed. Learners are expected to reflect on ethical conflicts related to social and political responsibilities and the wider impact of their choices and decisions. Learners also develop the knowledge, skills, values and attitudes to care for others and the environment and to engage in civic action. These include compassion, empathy, collaboration, dialogue, social entrepreneurship and active participation. They learn about opportunities for engagement as citizens at local, national and global levels, and examples of individual and collective action taken by others to address global issues and social injustice.

== Examples ==
=== Council for Global Citizenship Education, India (and global) ===
Council for Global Citizenship Education — part of the Global Citizenship Foundation, a non-profit organization based in India and the European Union — assists schools to adopt a participatory whole-school approach to global citizenship education through the GCED Innovative Schools Initiative. The initiative fosters continuous professional development (CPD) of educators; teacher-led contextualization, design, and development of GCED curriculum; engagement of children through the '100 Acts of Global Citizenship' School Challenge; and community through a Global Citizenship Festival at '100 Acts of Global Citizenship' participating schools. The Council for Global Citizenship Education initiative has also been implemented in 18 States of India and has a global presence through their GCED Ambassadors Program.

=== High Resolves, Australia ===
High Resolves is a secondary school educational initiative (implemented by the FYA, the only national, independent non-profit organisation for young people in Australia) consisting of a Global Citizenship Programme for Year 8 students and a Global Leadership Programme for Year 9 and 10 students. It aims to enable students to consider their personal role in developing their society as a global community through workshops, simulations, leadership skills training and hands-on action projects.

=== Developing the global dimension in the school curriculum, England ===
In England, the Department for Education and Skills produced Developing the global dimension in the school curriculum, a publication for head teachers, teachers, senior managers and those with responsibility for curriculum development. It aims to show how the global dimension can be integrated in the curriculum and across the school. It provides examples of how to integrate the global dimension from age 3 to age 16, outlining eight key concepts – global citizenship, conflict resolution, diversity, human rights, interdependence, sustainable development, values and perceptions, and social justice. For example, it gives guidance for the promotion of personal, social and emotional development of the youngest learners through discussion of photographs of children from around the world, activities, stories, and discussion of different places children have visited.

=== Activate, South Africa ===
Activate is a network of young leaders in South Africa which aims to bring about change though creative solutions to problems in society. Youth from all backgrounds and provinces in the country participate in a two-year programme. In the first year, there are three residential training programmes, working on a particular task. In the second year, participants form action groups on specific tasks, taking their work into the public domain. In one example, an Activator describes how he works in his local community to discourage young people away from joining gangs and engaging in substance abuse. He draws on his own negative experiences with gangs and drugs, having served seven years in jail. On being interviewed, he states: “My vision for South Africa is to see young people standing up and becoming role models... Be yourself, be real and pursue your dreams”.

=== Peace First, United States and Colombia ===
Peace First, a non-profit organisation based in the United States, has a programme in which youth volunteers work with children to design and implement community projects in a participatory way. The rationale is that children are natural creative thinkers and problem solvers. The programme focuses on developing social and emotional skills of self- awareness, empathy, inclusivity and relationships. It has also been implemented in rural areas of Colombia through a partnership between local governments and Colombian NGOs. Peace First has additionally developed a curriculum that can be used in schools. It addresses themes such as friendship, fairness, cooperation, conflict resolution and consequences of actions through experiential activities and cooperative games. For example, 1st graders learn about communicating their feelings, 3rd graders develop skills and awareness around communication and cooperation, 4th graders practice courage and taking a stand and 5th graders explore how to resolve and de-escalate conflicts.

=== Tokyo Global Engineering Corporation, Japan (and global) ===
Tokyo Global Engineering Corporation is an education-services organization that provides capstone education programs free of charge to engineering students and other stakeholders. These programs are intended to complement—but not to replace—coursework required by academic degree programs of study. The programs are educational opportunities, and students are not paid money for their participation. All correspondence among members is completed via e-mail, and all meetings are held via Skype, with English as the language of instruction and publication. Students and other stakeholders are never asked to travel or leave their geographic locations, and are encouraged to publish organizational documents in their personal, primary languages, when English is a secondary language.

== Connection to Education for Sustainable Development (ESD) ==
GCED and ESD share a common goal of enabling learners of all ages to contribute to a more just, peaceful, tolerant, inclusive, and sustainable world. Both GCED and ESD:

- focus not only on the content and outcome of what is learned, but also on the process of how it is learned and in what type of environment it is learned.
- emphasize action, change and transformation.
- place importance on acquiring values and attitudes relevant to addressing global challenges.
- foster skills for collaboration, communication and critical thinking.

Both GCE and ESD help learners understand the interconnected world in which they live and the complexities of the global challenges faced. GCE and ESD help learners to develop their knowledge, skills, attitudes and values so that they can address these challenges responsibly and effectively now and in the future.

== Connection to Education for Justice ==
GCED provides the overall framework for education for justice or the approach to the rule of law (RoL). It aims to empower learners to engage and assume active roles, both locally and globally, as proactive contributors to a more just, peaceful, tolerant, inclusive, secure and sustainable world.

The GCED expected learning outcomes are based on a vision of learning that covers three domains to create a well-rounded learning experience: cognitive, socio-emotional and behavioural. Although distinct, the three domains do not represent isolated learning processes; they often overlap, reinforce and build upon each other, and can also occur in parallel. For example, socio-emotional learning requires understanding existing challenges in the community (cognitive) and making informed decisions (behavioural).

Teachers strive to develop learners’ ability to use the knowledge they have, or have gained, to alter their behaviours and ‘do the right thing’ in the appropriate circumstances. For example, learning how to take ethical decisions and speaking out against discrimination. Making this shift from ‘knowing’ to ‘doing’ involves helping learners apply their knowledge to real-world situations.

== Objections ==
Some fundamentalist critics believe GCE might undermine religious education and promote secular values. Others are concerned that the pedagogical approach of most global citizenship education curricula are too often produced in particular Northern, Western contexts. Some OF critics claim that GCE curricula promote values that are too individualistic. Dill, for example, claims that "the majority of the world experiences social and communal life not in terms of isolated individuals, but as collective identities and traditions. For many of these groups, the dominant forms of global citizenship education and its moral order will be experienced as coercive and unjust', so 'global' citizenship curriculum should be seen as a local practice, "which diverse cultures will conceptualize and construct differently".

== See also ==
- Citizenship education (subject)
- Global civics
- Climate Change Education (CCE)
- Climate-friendly school
- Futures of Education
- Global citizenship
- Global education
- International education
- Peace education
- UNESCO ASPnet
