= Geoff Todd =

Australian artist (born 1950)

Geoff Todd AM
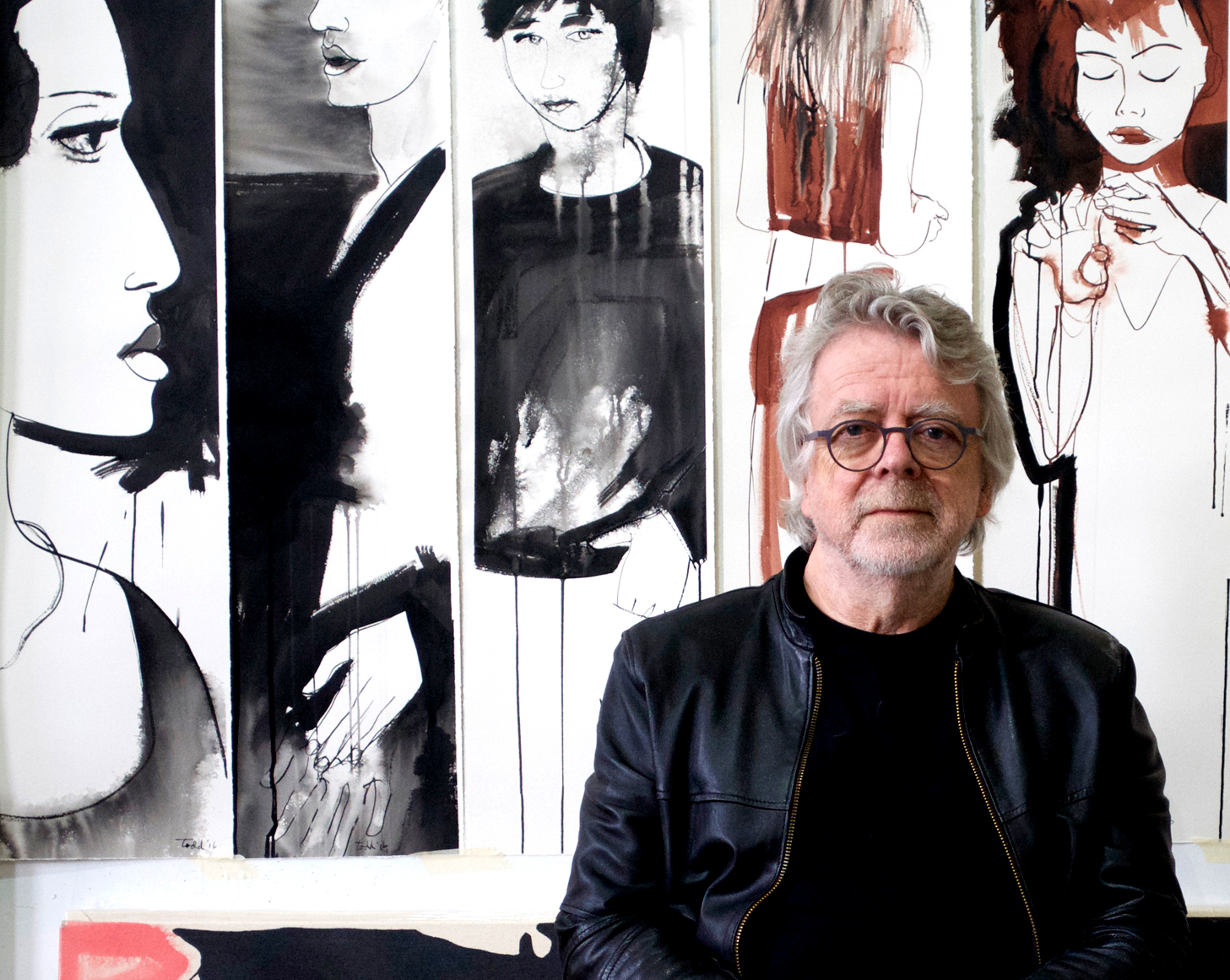
- Studio Shot of Geoff Todd in front of 'FAITH' Ink drawings 2016/ 2017
- Born: 1950 (age 75–76); Chelsea, Victoria, Australia
- Style: Contemporary figurative style in drawing, painting and sculpture
- Website: geofftodd.com

Geoff Todd (born 1950 in Chelsea, Victoria) is an Australian artist and social commentator. Todd has a contemporary figurative style in drawing, painting and sculpture. He works among studios in Winnellie, Northern Territory and Ararat, Victoria.

== Early life and education ==
Todd grew up on a small dairy farm in Gippsland, Victoria. He worked as an art teacher in Victorian State technical schools during the 1970s and 1980s. While teaching at Monterey Secondary College in 1980, he took a half-year residency at the Victorian College of the Arts in Melbourne before heading to Maningrida in Arnhem Land in the Northern Territory in 1984, where he served as a craft adviser.

Following his departure from Maningrida in 1987, Todd worked as an art lecturer at Batchelor Institute in Rum Jungle, Northern Territory, before becoming a part-time sculpture lecturer at Charles Darwin University.

== Art style ==
Todd’s figurative work addresses a range of themes, sometimes incorporating elements of intimacy and eroticism, and themes of social justice and activism, responding to broader political issues from the so-called 'Bali Nine' arrests in 2005 to the September 11 attacks. On his portrait of Judas Iscariot, the American author Susan Gubar wrote "Todd's image emphasizes guilt, remorse, a conviction about one's worthlessness. Less a demon, more a monk or mendicant, a hopeless Judas atoning in desolate silence clarifies how it feels to be John's son of perdition, an anathema."

== Exhibitions ==
Todd began his career as an artist in the mid-1970s. In 1978, Powell Street Gallery in Melbourne first exhibited his "Book Sculptures." In 1984, he presented an exhibition of "Dictionary Paintings" at Christine Abrahams Gallery, incorporating silkscreen, etching, and woodblock prints, a collage to reproduce well-known magazines, children's storybooks, and an illustrated dictionary.

In his career, Todd has done public commissions, including the facades of the Supreme Court of the Northern Territory and the Northern Territory Parliament House in 1994. He has work displayed in various Indonesian museums' permanent collections. Some of his pieces have been acquired by the Northern Territory Museums and Art Galleries' permanent collection.

In 1999, Todd held an exhibition at Benteng Vredeberg (The Dutch Fort) in Yogyakarta, Java, which was inaugurated by Prince Prabukusomo, the younger brother of the Sultan Hamengkubuwono X of Yogyakarta.

In 2017, the Darwin gallery, Framed, featured Todd's work for their closing exhibition. The solo show, along with the book "Reflections", revealed thirty years of the artist's work and thought processes.

In 2019, he was recognized as a Member of the Order of Australia (AM) in the Australia Day Honours for his "significant service to the visual arts as an artist and sculptor." Creating works inspired by Indonesian women and children, as well as creating illustrations for a book on Diponegoro and painting a series of works inspired by the Rama and Shinta lore, he was chosen as the collaboration artist by the Indonesian fashion house PURANA, where his works have been showcased in the Fashion Nation event in Jakarta on March 22, 2019.
