= MARKAL =

MARKAL is a numerical model used to carry out economic analysis of different energy related systems at the country level to represent its evolution over a period of usually of 40–50 years. The word MARKAL was generated by concatenating two words (MARKet and ALlocation). Various parameters such as energy costs, plant costs, plant performances, building performance and so on, can be input and the software will choose an optimal technology mix to meet that demand at minimum cost. It is available from the International Energy Agency. TIMES is an evolution of MARKAL and both energy models share many similarities.

== Applications ==
A 2009 report describes a newly developed and updated UK MARKAL elastic demand (MED) model, used to explore low carbon pathways for the United Kingdom.

== See also ==
- Energy modeling
