= High Resolves =

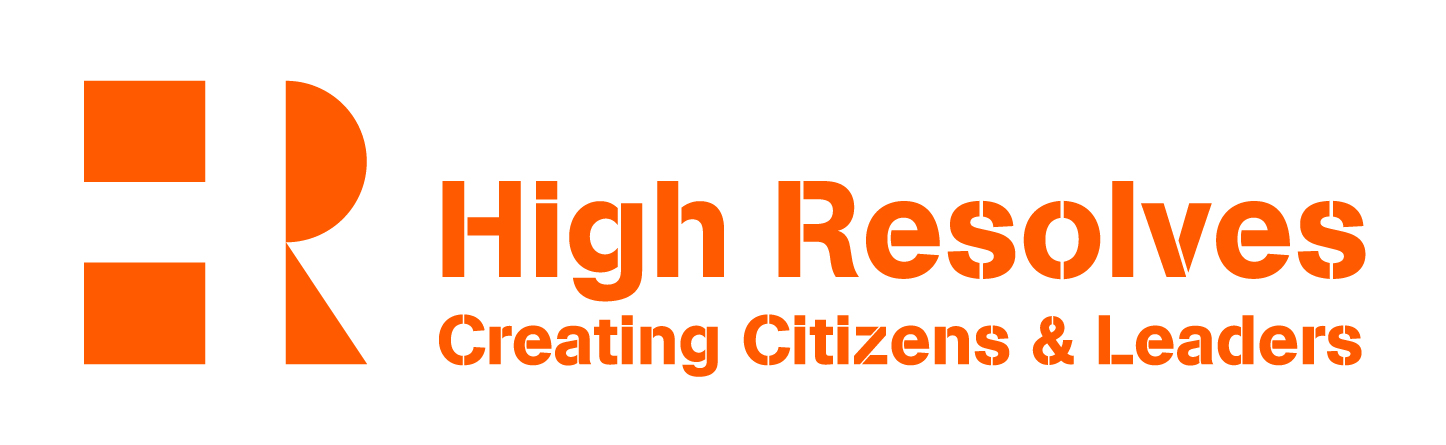
- Founded: 2005; 21 years ago Australia
- Type: Nonprofit; INGO
- Headquarters: Sydney, Australia
- Location: Australia, United States, Canada, China
- Services: Youth empowerment
- Co founders: Mehrdad Baghai, Roya Baghai
- Website: HighResolves.org

High Resolves (or the High Resolves Initiative) is an International non-governmental organization for young people. The aim of High Resolves programs are to educate high-school aged students in the meaning of being a global citizen. High Resolves programs emerged from simulations developed by co-founder Mehrdad Baghai and Nobel Laureate Thomas Schelling at Harvard University.

== History ==
High Resolves was founded in 2005 by Mehrdad Baghai author of The Alchemy of Growth and his wife Roya. High Resolves started as an experiment in Baghai's son's school in Sydney, Australia, and had expanded to at least 350 Australian schools by 2018, having engaged more than 200,000 Australian students since its inception.

In 2014 the Australian Council for Educational Research conducted an independent evaluation of the programs and found: "High Resolves is meeting its intended purposes, namely it is effectively engaging and helping to empower young Australians to take part and be active in their communities".

== Program ==
Collective Action: a series of High Resolves programs for students, which teach personal decision-making skills and encourage critical thinking about social change.

Collective Identity: an investigation of cosmopolitanism.

Justice: an exploration of fairness, especially in the distribution of wealth and poverty.

== Awards and honours ==
Author and venture capital entrepreneur Mehrdad Baghai, a member of the Initiative, was short-listed as a finalist for the first Aspen Institute, John P. McNulty Prize in 2008, and ultimately was the winner of the award in 2018, the prize's eleventh year, citing extraordinary leadership.

High Resolves won the 2015 Patrons Prize in the national Good Design Awards.

== Videos for Change Challenge ==
High Resolves created Videos for Change in 2015 to help students to take action and feel empowered to create change in the world.

The challenge is for young people from high school years 7 to 12 to create a one-minute video on a social issue they feel passionate about. Past participants have covered issues such as social inclusion, racism, domestic violence, gender equality, LGBTQI rights, and bullying.

== Charity status ==
High Resolves has the charity status of Deductible Gift Recipients (DGR) in Australia and High Resolves America has 501(c)(3) status in the US which allows for US federal tax exemption of nonprofit organizations, specifically those that are considered public charities.
