= 2025 Australian federal election =

Election of Australia's 48th parliament

- 3 May 2025

All 150 seats in the House of Representatives 76 seats needed for a majority 40 of 76 seats in the Senate
- Opinion polls
- Registered: 18,098,797 ▲5.0% (98.2% of eligible)
- Turnout: 90.70% (▲0.88 pp)
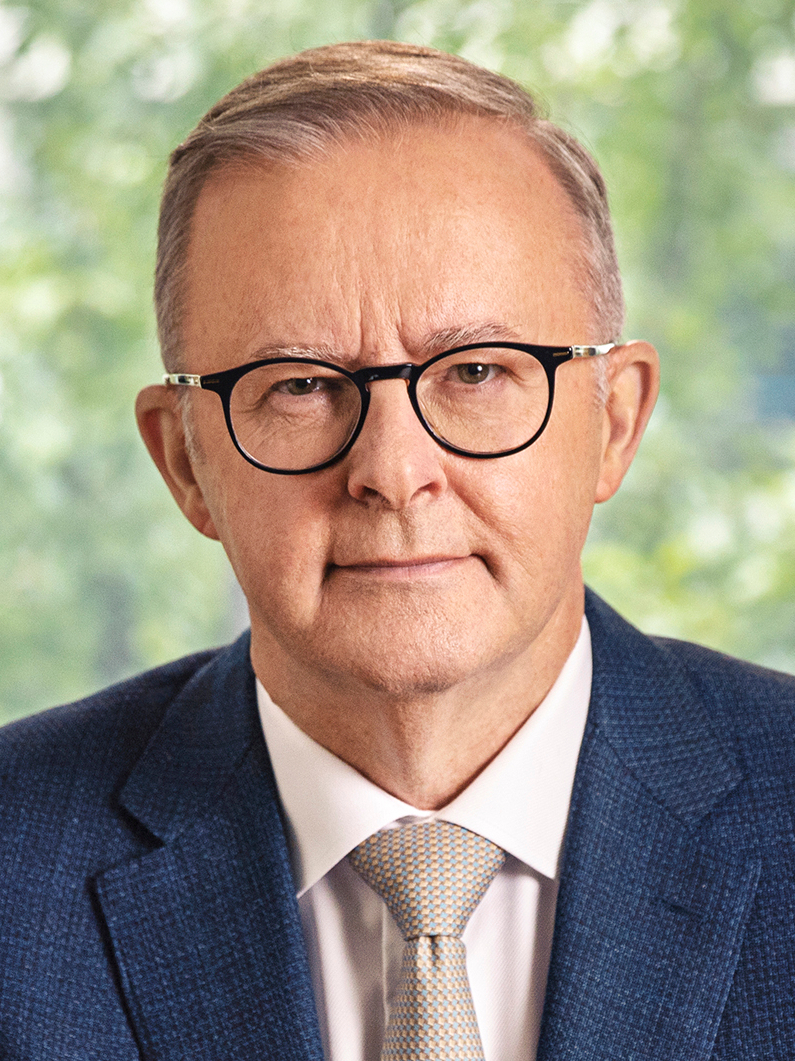

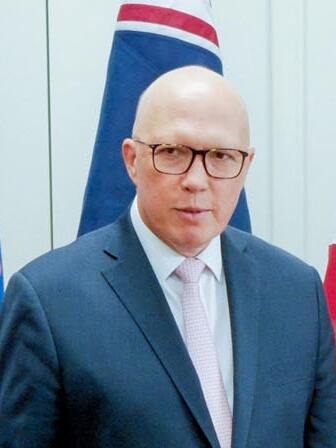

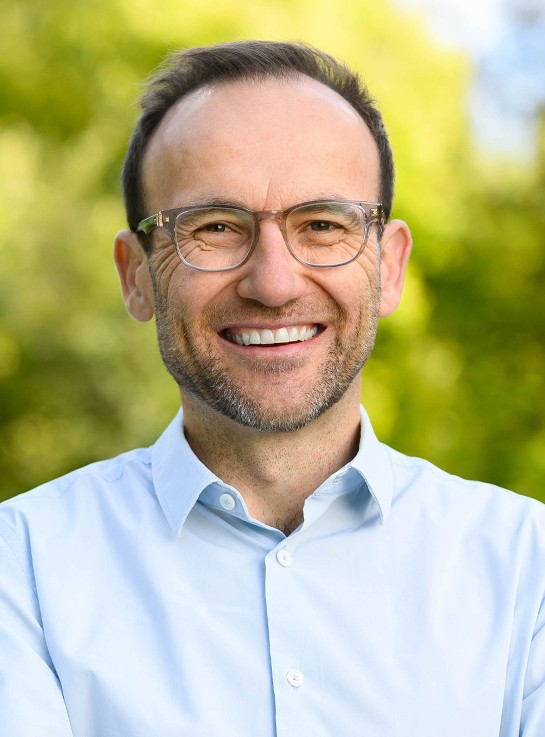

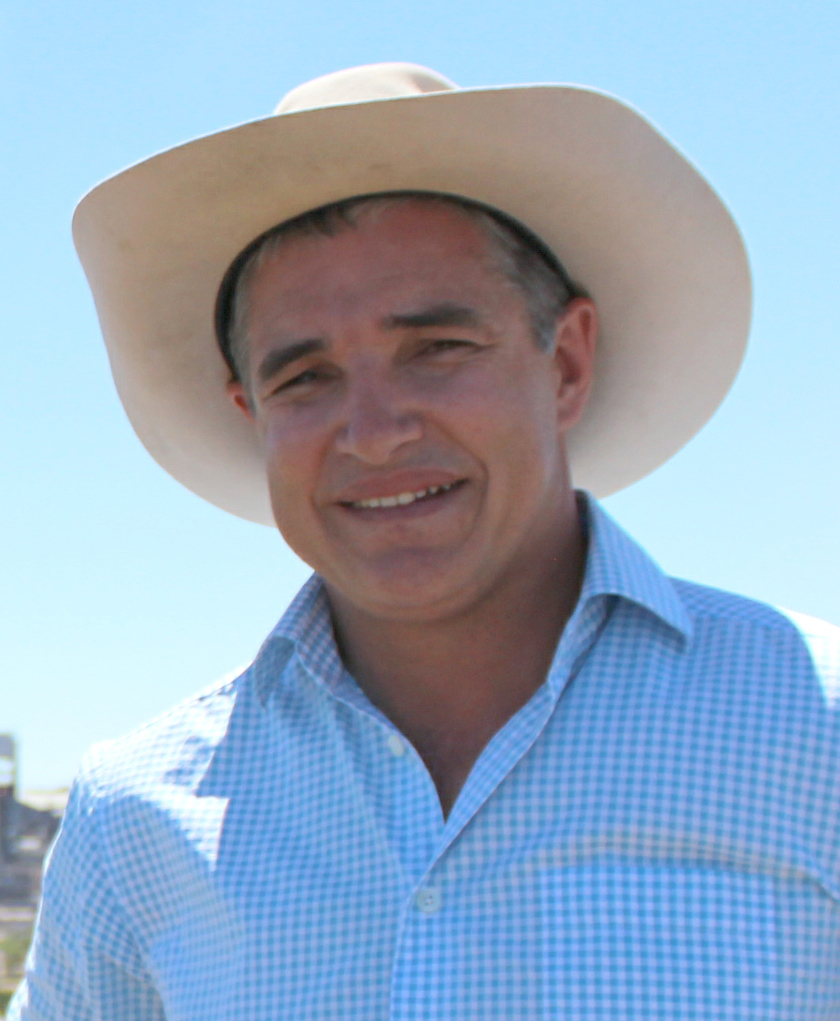

	First party	Second party	Third party
Leader	Anthony Albanese	Peter Dutton	Adam Bandt
Party	Labor	Coalition	Greens
Leader since	30 May 2019	30 May 2022	4 February 2020
Leader's seat	Grayndler (NSW)	Dickson (Qld.) (lost seat)	Melbourne (Vic.) (lost seat)
Last election	77 seats	58 seats	4 seats
Seats before	77 (Note: Labor gained the seat of Aston from the Liberals at a by-election in April 2023.; The seat of Maribyrnong became vacant in January 2025 following the resignation of Bill Shorten.)	53 (Note: In December 2022, Andrew Gee (MP for Calare) left the National Party and became an independent.; In April 2023, the Liberal Party lost the seat of Aston to Labor at a by-election.; In November 2023, Russell Broadbent (MP for Monash) left the Liberal Party following his preselection loss and sat as an independent.; In January 2025, Ian Goodenough (MP for Moore) left the Liberal Party following a preselection loss and sat as an independent.; The seat of Hinkler became vacant in January 2025 following the resignation of Keith Pitt.)	4
Seats won	94	43	1
Seat change	▲17	▼15	▼3
Primary vote	5,354,138	4,929,402	1,889,977
Percentage	34.56%	31.82%	12.20%
Swing	▲1.98 pp	▼3.88 pp	▼0.05 pp
TPP	55.22%	44.78%
TPP swing	▲3.09 pp	▼3.09 pp
	Fourth party	Fifth party	Sixth party
			IND
Leader	Robbie Katter	No leader	N/A
Party	Katter's Australian	Centre Alliance	Independents
Leader since	3 February 2020	N/A	N/A
Leader's seat	Did not stand (Note: Katter did not contest the federal election; he was the incumbent member for Traeger in the Queensland Legislative Assembly.)	N/A	N/A
Last election	1 seat	1 seat	10 seats
Seats before	1	1	13 (Note: In December 2022, Andrew Gee (MP for Calare) left the National Party and became an independent.; In November 2023, Russell Broadbent (MP for Monash) left the Liberal Party following his preselection loss and sat as an independent.; In January 2025, Ian Goodenough (MP for Moore) left the Liberal Party following a preselection loss and sat as an independent.)
Seats won	1	1	10
Seat change	Steady	Steady	Steady
Primary vote	51,775	37,453	1,126,051
Percentage	0.33%	0.24%	7.27%
Swing	▼0.05 pp	▼0.01 pp	▲1.98 pp
Prime Minister before election
Anthony Albanese
Labor
Prime Minister after election
Anthony Albanese
Labor

A federal election was held on 3 May 2025 to elect members of the 48th Parliament of Australia. All 150 seats in the House of Representatives were up for election, along with 40 of the 76 seats in the Senate. The Labor government of Anthony Albanese was elected for a second term in a landslide victory over the opposition Liberal–National Coalition, led by Peter Dutton. Labor secured 94 seats in the House of Representatives—the highest number of seats ever won by a single political party in an Australian election. Labor also received the highest two-party-preferred vote of any party since 1975—at 55.22%. This victory was much larger than expected from the opinion polling released shortly before the election, which had predicted a smaller Labor majority or a minority government.

The election marked the fourth time in Australian history that a government secured at least 90 seats in the House of Representatives (after 1975, 1996 and 2013), the first time this feat had been achieved by a Labor government, and the first time it had been achieved by a single party. The Labor Party's 94 seats was tied with the Coalition's result in 1996 for the most seats ever won by a party or coalition. The re-elected Labor government also became the first returning government to retain every one of its seats since Harold Holt's Coalition victory in 1966.

The pertinent issues throughout the campaign were the cost of living, energy policy, housing, healthcare and defence. Key promises from Labor were to build 1.2 million new homes and legislate a 20% reduction in current tertiary student loan debt, while the Coalition campaigned on building seven nuclear power plants over 20 years and reducing the fuel excise by 25 cents per litre. Both the Liberal–National Coalition and the Labor Party proposed increases in defence spending.

The Australian Broadcasting Corporation (ABC) projected a second term for Labor within two and a half hours of east coast polls closing. Dutton conceded defeat shortly after 9:30 pm AEST on election night, announcing that he had called Albanese to congratulate him on Labor's re-election. Labor increased its parliamentary majority by gaining seats from incumbents on both flanks of the political spectrum; taking seats from the Liberals and the Greens. The Coalition suffered a large swing against them, particularly in urban areas. The Liberal Party, the Coalition's senior party, suffered its worst federal result in terms of vote share and its second-worst in seats since its formation in 1944. Dutton also lost his seat of Dickson to Labor candidate Ali France, the first time a federal opposition leader had been defeated in their own seat. The Greens' primary vote remained steady, though the party lost three of their four seats in the House of Representatives, including that of their leader Adam Bandt, who lost his seat of Melbourne to Labor.

In the Senate, Labor increased its share of seats to 28, while the Coalition fell to 27 seats, making Labor the largest bloc in the upper house for the first time since 1984. The Greens returned one senator from each state, leaving the party steady on 11. One Nation doubled its representation in the chamber to four, winning seats in New South Wales and Western Australia, the first time the party won a seat outside Queensland in a half-Senate election. Jacqui Lambie and David Pocock were re-elected in Tasmania and the Australian Capital Territory respectively. The size of the crossbench increased to 21, an increase of three since the 2022 election result. Prior to the new Senate's term commencing on 1 July, Greens senator Dorinda Cox defected from the party and joined the Labor Party, increasing Labor's voting bloc to 29 and decreasing the Greens seat count to 10.

Seventeen days after the election, the Nationals announced they would not renew their coalition agreement with the Liberals, ending the political partnership for the first time in 38 years. This left the Liberal Party as the sole official opposition party with a total of 28 seats with the Nationals taking 15 seats. The crossbench, including the Nationals, grew to 27 seats, the highest in modern Australian political history. The split, however, was short-lived; eight days after the announcement, the two parties reunited and formed a joint shadow ministry following policy agreements on nuclear power, a regional future fund, divestiture powers and regional telecommunications infrastructure.

== Background ==
=== Previous election ===
At the previous election in May 2022, the Labor Party, led by Anthony Albanese, formed a government after nine years in opposition, winning 77 seats in the House of Representatives, enough for a two-seat majority. The Liberal–National Coalition that had previously governed won only 58 seats and went into opposition. The crossbench, made up of other parties and independents, expanded to 16 seats: ten held by independents (including seven held by an informal grouping of teal independents), four by the Greens, and one each by the Centre Alliance and Katter's Australian Party.

In the Senate, Labor made no gains and remained steady at 26 seats overall, thus requiring 13 additional votes in the Senate to pass legislation. The Coalition lost four seats and retained only 32 seats. The Greens gained three seats to 12. One Nation also remained steady with two seats, Centre Alliance and Rex Patrick Team each lost their Senate seats, while the Jacqui Lambie Network gained a second seat. David Pocock was elected as an independent senator on his own ticket, and the United Australia Party also gained one seat.

=== Composition of Parliament ===
The 47th Parliament opened on 26 July 2022. The Liberal Party entered the parliament with a new leader, with former defence and home affairs minister Peter Dutton replacing the outgoing prime minister Scott Morrison. On 23 December, Nationals MP for Calare, Andrew Gee, left the party and became an independent, following the party's decision to campaign for a "No" vote in the 2023 Australian Indigenous Voice referendum. This change of parties caused the crossbench to increase to 17 seats, with the Coalition decreasing to 57 seats.

On 16 January 2023, Liberal senator Jim Molan died and was replaced by Maria Kovacic in May. On 6 February, Greens senator Lidia Thorpe resigned from the party to sit as an independent. On 1 April, Labor's Mary Doyle won the Aston by-election following the resignation of sitting Liberal MP Alan Tudge. The result was considered a major upset and marked the first time that an incumbent government had won a seat from the Opposition since the 1920 Kalgoorlie by-election. As a result, Labor increased their number of seats in the House of Representatives to 78, while the Coalition was reduced to 56 seats. In May 2023, incumbent Liberal National MP Stuart Robert resigned, triggering another by-election, this time in the seat of Fadden on the Gold Coast. The seat was won by Liberal National candidate Cameron Caldwell, keeping the composition of the parliament unchanged. Also in May, Dai Le, the independent member for the seat of Fowler in Western Sydney, formed her own political party, the Dai Le and Frank Carbone Network, alongside Frank Carbone, the mayor of Fairfield. The party would be primarily based in Western Sydney.

On 15 June 2023, Liberal senator David Van was expelled from the party following sexual misconduct allegations by former LNP senator Amanda Stoker and independent senator Lidia Thorpe. He continued his term as an independent. On 14 November, following a party preselection defeat, Liberal MP Russell Broadbent left the party to sit as an independent. November also saw Dave Sharma return to parliament, this time as a Liberal senator, after the resignation of party veteran Marise Payne. On 4 December, Labor MP Peta Murphy died of cancer, reducing Labor to 77 seats, though the party's share was restored to 78 seats on 2 March 2024, when candidate Jodie Belyea retained the seat of Dunkley at the subsequent by-election. Similarly the Liberal Party's numbers were temporarily reduced when on 28 February 2024 when former prime minister Scott Morrison resigned as the member for Cook. Liberal candidate Simon Kennedy retained the seat for the party at the Cook by-election.

Labor senator Pat Dodson resigned from the Senate in January 2024 while undergoing cancer treatment. His vacancy was filled by Varun Ghosh. Labor senator Linda White died in March and was replaced by Lisa Darmanin, while Greens senator Janet Rice resigned the following month and was replaced by Steph Hodgins-May. Party-compositional changes occurred when Tasmanian senator Tammy Tyrrell quit the Jacqui Lambie Network to sit as an independent on 28 March and Labor senator Fatima Payman left the party and joined the crossbench as an independent in July, citing disagreement with the party's position concerning the Israel–Gaza conflict. Three months later, Payman established the Australia's Voice party, stating that she intended for the party to field candidates in both houses of parliament at this election. The Senate composition changed once again on 25 August when LNP senator Gerard Rennick resigned from the party and moved to the crossbench to sit as an independent following a preselection defeat. Like Payman, he announced his intention to establish a political party, named the Gerard Rennick People First, so that his name would be featured above the line on the election ballot. On 31 December, the Liberal member for Moore, Ian Goodenough, left the Liberal Party to stand as an independent following preselection loss.

On 28 January 2025, Liberal senator Simon Birmingham resigned from Parliament. The following week, on 6 February, Leah Blyth was appointed to the Senate as his replacement. Two lower house seats were made vacant prior to the election; Liberal National MP Keith Pitt, who sat in the Nationals Party room, resigned as the member for Hinkler on 19 January, and the following day Labor MP Bill Shorten resigned as the member for Maribyrnong. With their resignations occurring close to the federal election, by-elections were not held.

=== Events of the 47th Parliament ===
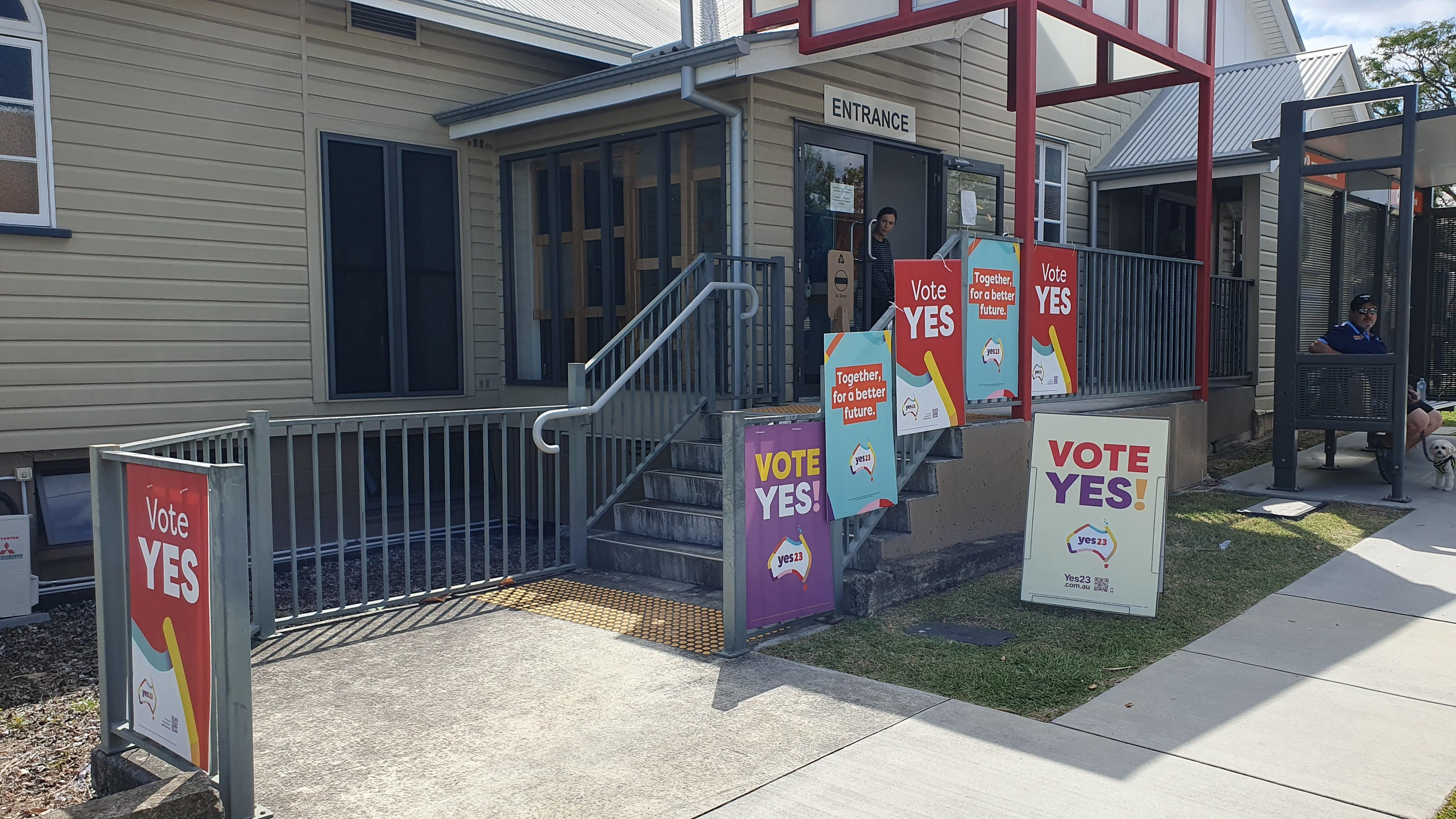
A polling booth with corflutes supporting the Yes vote at the 2023 Voice to Parliament referendum, October 2023

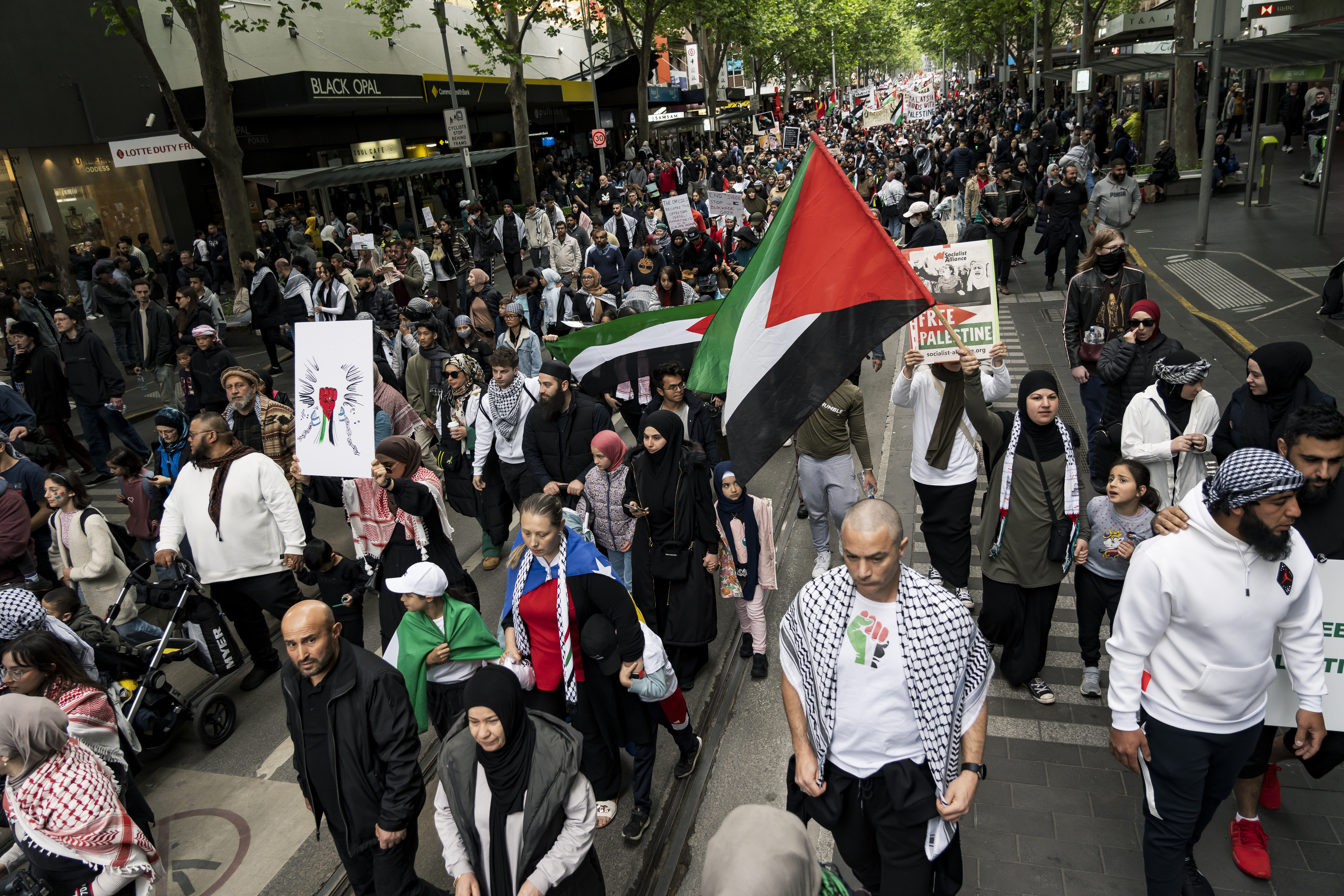
A Gaza War protest in Melbourne, October 2023

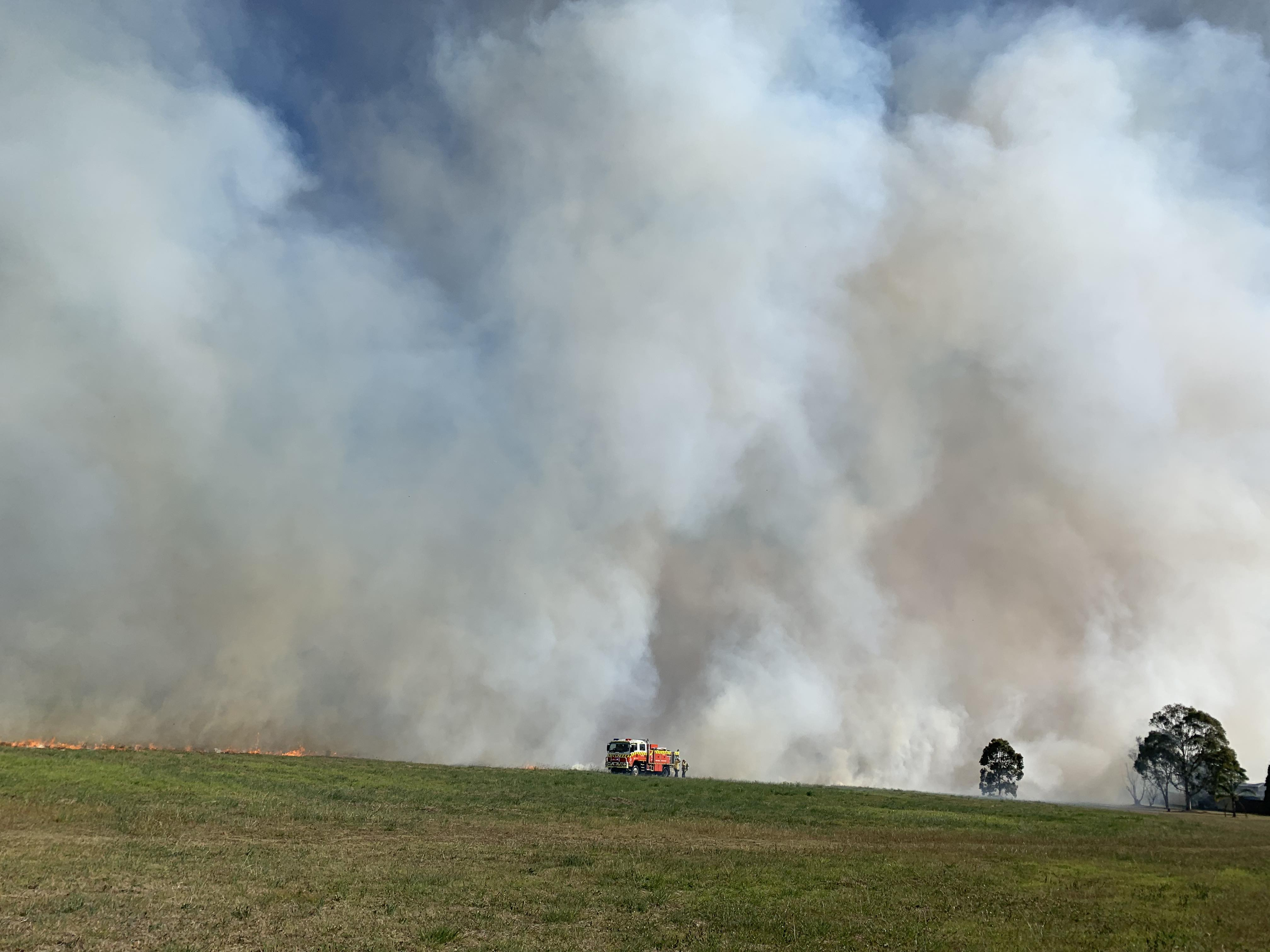
Firefighters battling a grass fire, in Bow Bowing, Sydney in October 2023

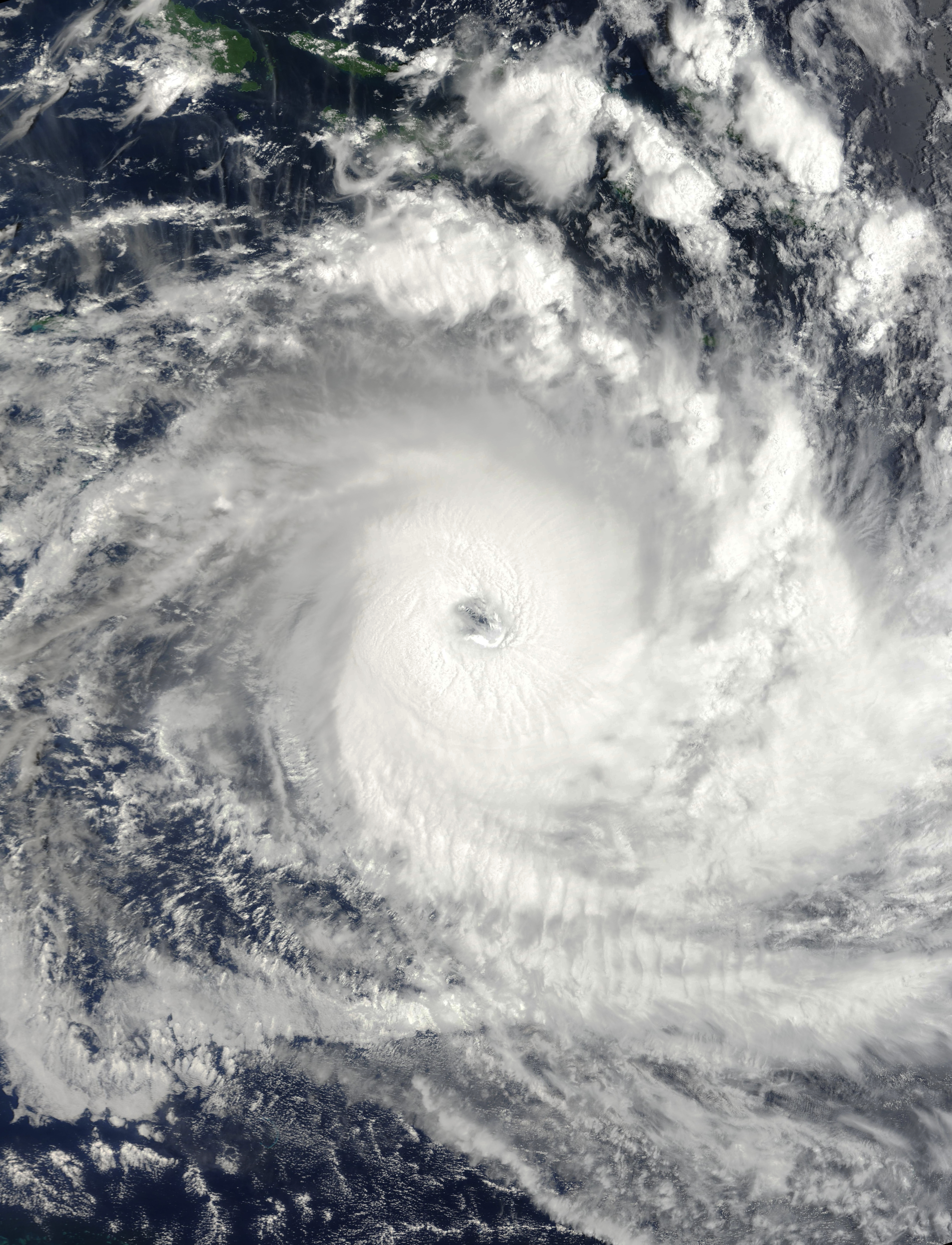
Cyclone Jasper approaching Australia in December 2023

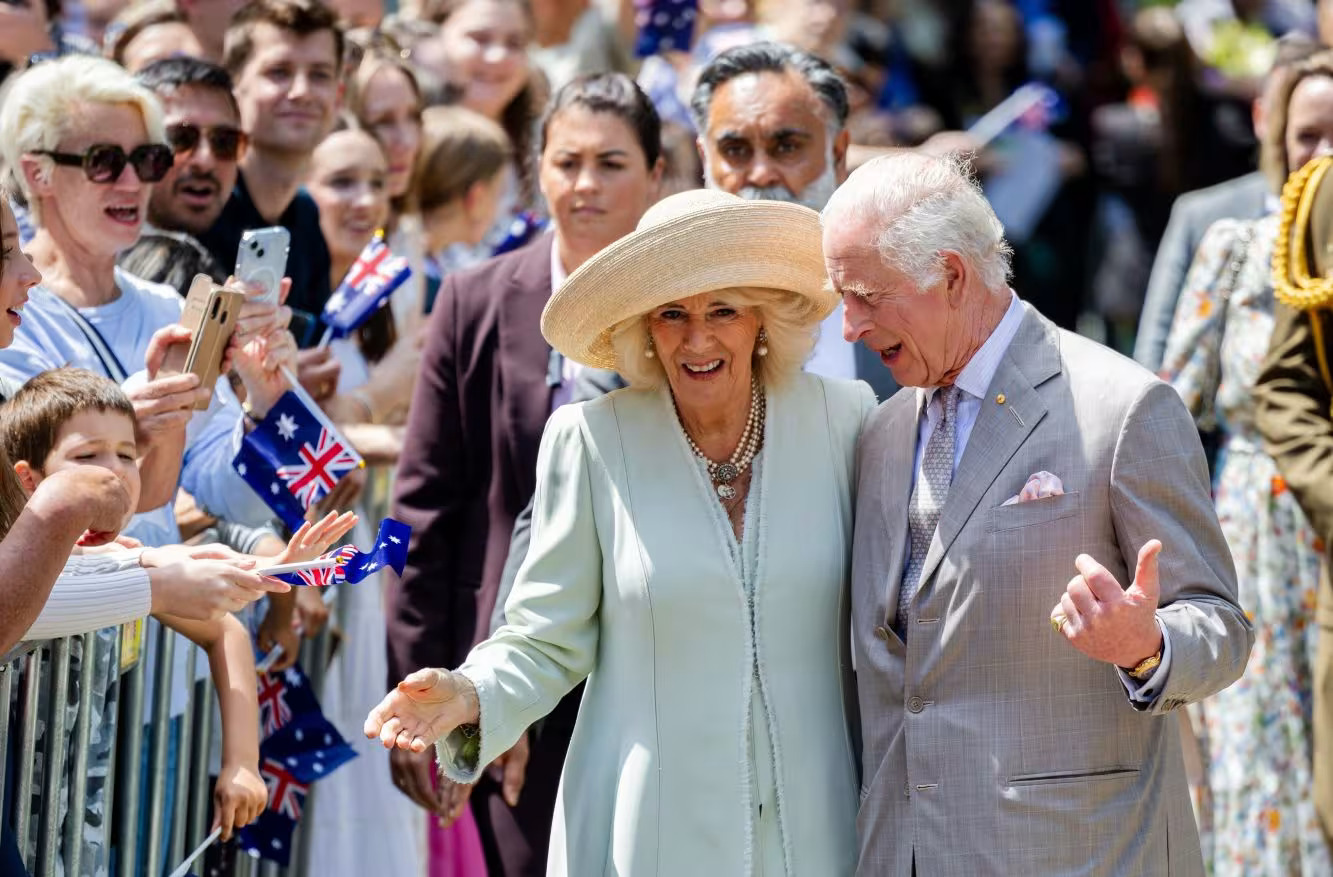
The King and Queen visiting Sydney, October 2024

Both major parties retained their leaders throughout the duration of the 47th Parliament, with Anthony Albanese having served one full term as prime minister and a second consecutive term as leader of the Labor Party, while Peter Dutton completed his first full term as Opposition Leader and leader of the Liberal Party. The Albanese ministry was reshuffled in July 2024, followed by a minor reshuffle in January 2025, while the shadow ministry of Peter Dutton was reshuffled in April 2023, March 2024, and January 2025.

The 2023 Australian Indigenous Voice referendum featured prominently in political discourse during the first half of the parliamentary term. First proposed in the 2017 Uluru Statement from the Heart, an Indigenous Voice to Parliament was supported by the Labor Party as part of its 2022 election platform. The "Yes" campaign in support of the Voice initially attracted some bipartisan support, including Coalition figures such as Gee, former Minister for Indigenous Australians Ken Wyatt, and then-Shadow Minister for Indigenous Australians Julian Leeser; however, the National Party came out against the Voice in November 2022, as did the Liberal Party in April 2023. First-term Country Liberal Party senator Jacinta Nampijinpa Price, who succeeded Leeser as Shadow Minister for Indigenous Australians, took on a prominent role in the "No" campaign. In August 2023, Albanese announced the referendum would be held on 14 October 2023. 60% of voters, including a majority in all six states, voted against the proposed constitutional changes.

The death and state funeral of Elizabeth II, the long-serving head of state of Australia and other Commonwealth realms, took place in September 2022, followed by the coronation of Charles III and Camilla in May 2023; as a result, 2025 was the first federal election under the reign of Charles III. King Charles visited Australia in October 2024, the first visit by a reigning monarch since 2011. Independent senator Lidia Thorpe, who had resigned from the Greens in February 2023 over disagreements regarding the proposed Voice to Parliament, attracted significant media attention for shouting at Charles during an event at Parliament House in Canberra. Gaza war protests in Australia began in October 2023; responses to the war, particularly among local Jewish and Muslim communities, were perceived as a significant threat to peaceful discourse in Australia. Incidents of antisemitism and Islamophobia also increased, prompting the government to appoint three "special envoys": in July 2024, Jillian Segal as Special Envoy to Combat Antisemitism, and Labor MP Peter Khalil as Special Envoy for Social Cohesion; and in September 2024, Aftab Malik as Special Envoy to Combat Islamophobia.

Climate change remained a prominent issue, partly due to the impact of natural disasters, including the 2022 south eastern Australia floods and the 2023–24 Australian bushfire season, which led to seven deaths and ten deaths respectively, as well as Cyclone Jasper and Cyclone Alfred, which caused significant property damage on the eastern coast in December 2023 and March 2025, respectively. Changes to government infrastructure included: the establishment of the National Anti-Corruption Commission in July 2023; the launch of the Housing Australia Future Fund in November 2023; the replacement of the Administrative Appeals Tribunal with the Administrative Review Tribunal in October 2024; and the passage of the Online Safety Amendment (Social Media Minimum Age) Act 2024 in November 2024.

=== Pre-election standings and pendulum ===
Parties are listed according to their vote share at the last federal election.

Affiliation	House			Senate		
Affiliation	Results of the 2022 election	As of 24 February 2025	Change	Results of the 2022 election	As of 24 February 2025	Change
Labor	77	77	0	26	25	▼1
Coalition	58	53	▼5	32	30	▼2
The Greens	4	4	0	12	11	▼1
One Nation	0	0	0	2	2	0
United Australia (Note: The UAP was voluntarily de-registered in 2022 and, therefore, cannot appear on the ballot paper. Incumbent senator and party leader Ralph Babet is not up for election and is permitted to sit as a member of the UAP despite the party's de-registration.)	0	0	0	1	1	0
Katter's Australian	1	1	0	0	0	0
Centre Alliance	1	1	0	0	0	0
Lambie Network	0	0	0	2	1	▼1
Australia's Voice (Note: Fatima Payman had quit from the Labor Party prior to the election being called, and formed her own.)	0	0	0	0	1	▲1
People First (Note: Gerard Rennick had quit from the Liberal National Party of Queensland prior to the election being called, and formed his own.)	0	0	0	0	1	▲1
Independents (Note: Includes David Pocock, who was elected on an independent Senate platform for the ACT; however, he registered for ballot purposes an eponymous party for which he was one of two candidates.)	10	13	▲3	1	4	▲3
Vacant (Note: Division of Hinkler and Division of Maribyrnong)	0	2	▲2	0	0	Steady
Total seats	151			76		

== Electoral system ==
Members of the House of Representatives are elected by instant-runoff voting using full preferential voting. Each electorate elects one member.

Senators are elected by proportional representation using single transferable vote. In states, senators are elected from state-wide twelve-member districts (although in most cases only six seats are contested at a single election). In territories, senators are elected in territory-wide two-member districts. Ballots are counted at least twice, at the polling place and, starting Monday night after election day, at counting centres.

=== Redistribution ===
Abolished divisions

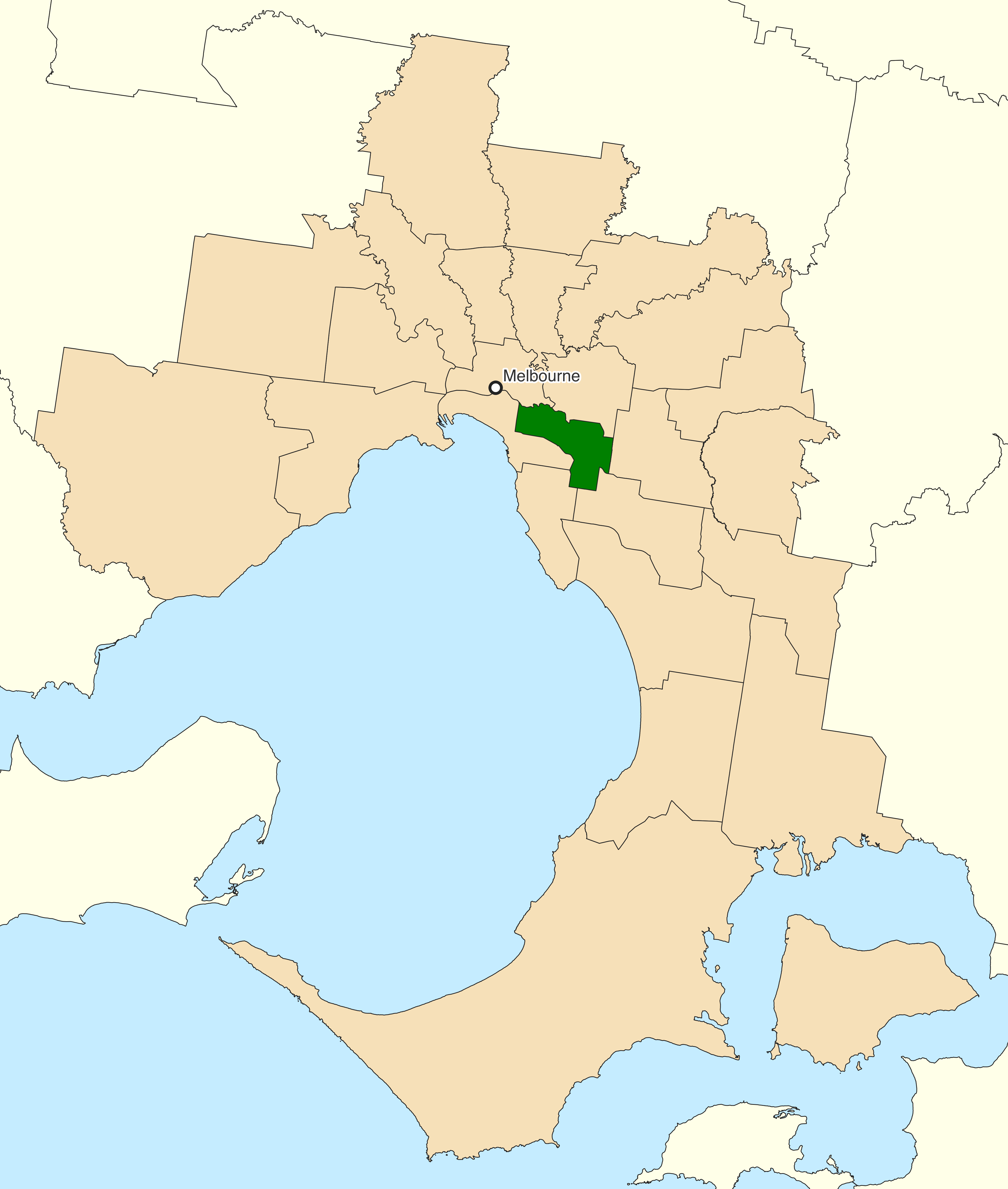
The division of Higgins (Melbourne, Victoria) prior to abolition

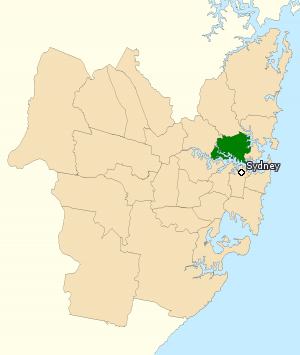
The division of North Sydney (Sydney, New South Wales) prior to abolition

The Australian Electoral Commission (AEC) is required, one year after the first sitting day for a new House of Representatives, to determine the number of members to which each state and territory is entitled. If the number in any state changes, a redistribution would be required in those states. A redistribution would be postponed if it would begin within one year of the expiration of the House of Representatives. The apportionment determination was made in July 2023 based on the population figures for December 2022. The determination resulted in a reduction of one seat in New South Wales to 46, a reduction of one seat in Victoria to 38 and an increase of one seat in Western Australia to 16. The total number of seats in the House of Representatives decreased from 151 to 150 at the 2025 federal election.

In May and June 2024, the AEC released its draft proposals for electorate changes, recommending the creation of the Division of Bullwinkel (Western Australia) in the outer eastern suburbs of Perth, and the abolition of the Division of Higgins (Victoria) in Melbourne's inner south-east (held by Labor's Michelle Ananda-Rajah) and the Division of North Sydney (New South Wales) in Sydney's inner north-east (held by Kylea Tink, a teal independent). In addition, the commission proposed altering the boundaries of several seats in all three states.

The Western Australia and Victoria-based changes were confirmed by the commission on 5 September 2024, with the new boundaries gazetted respectively on 24 September and 17 October. The New South Wales changes were confirmed on 12 September, and were gazetted on 10 October 2024. According to prominent psephologist Antony Green, some of the more significant changes to existing electorates included: the Division of Hasluck, losing much of its area to the new seat of Bullwinkel and shifting westwards into Perth's northeastern suburbs; in Melbourne, the Divisions of Melbourne and Wills moving to the south, and the Divisions of Chisholm and Menzies moving westwards; the Division of Riverina shifting south-east and losing the towns of West Wyalong, Parkes and Forbes; and the Division of Hume losing the majority of its area in the south, including the city of Goulburn.

The Northern Territory also underwent a scheduled redistribution as seven years had elapsed since its last redistribution. There was a small adjustment to its two federal electorates, with the Division of Solomon gaining some of the eastern suburbs of Palmerston from the Division of Lingiari.

Redistributions were due to take place for Tasmania's and Queensland's electoral boundaries in November 2024 and March 2025 respectively, due to them being seven years since the day of the last determination in the respective state; however, these were deferred as they would occur within one year of the expiration of the House of Representatives. The redistributions would instead commence within 30 days after the first sitting day of the new House of Representatives in the 48th Parliament of Australia.

=== Voter registration ===
Enrolment of eligible voters is compulsory. Voters must notify the AEC within 8 weeks of a change of address or after turning 18. The electoral rolls are closed for new enrolments or update of details about a week after the issue of writs for election. Enrolment is optional for 16 or 17-year-olds, but they cannot vote until they turn 18, and persons who have applied for Australian citizenship may also apply for provisional enrolment which takes effect on the granting of citizenship.

== Election date ==
=== Legal provisions ===
The constitutional and legal provisions which impact on the choice of election dates include:

- Section 12 of the Constitution says: "The Governor of any State may cause writs to be issued for the election of Senators for that State."
- Section 13 of the Constitution provides that the election of senators shall be held in the period of twelve months before the places become vacant and that senators shall take their seats on 1 July.
- Section 28 of the Constitution says: "Every House of Representatives shall continue for three years from the first sitting of the House, and no longer, but may be sooner dissolved by the Governor-General." Since the 47th Parliament of Australia opened on 26 July 2022, it expired on 25 July 2025.
- Section 32 of the Constitution says: "The writs shall be issued within ten days from the expiry of a House of Representatives or from the proclamation of a dissolution thereof." Ten days after 25 July 2025 is 4 August 2025.
- Section 156(1) of the Commonwealth Electoral Act 1918 (CEA) says: "The date fixed for the nomination of the candidates shall not be less than 10 days nor more than 27 days after the date of the writ." Twenty-seven days after 4 August 2025 is 31 August 2025.
- Section 157 of the CEA says: "The date fixed for the polling shall not be less than 23 days nor more than 31 days after the date of nomination." Thirty-one days after 31 August 2025 is 1 October 2025, a Wednesday.
- Section 158 of the CEA says: "The day fixed for the polling shall be a Saturday." The Saturday before 1 October 2025 is 27 September 2025, which was the latest possible date for the lower house election.

The election of senators must take place within one year before the terms expire for half-Senate elections, so that the writs for a half-Senate election could not have been issued earlier than 1 July 2024. Since campaigns are for a minimum of 33 days, the earliest possible date for a simultaneous House and half-Senate election was Saturday, 3 August 2024. The latest that a half-Senate election could be held must allow time for the votes to be counted and the writs to be returned before the newly elected senators take office on 1 July 2025. The previous election's writs were returned on 24 June 2022, 34 days after the 2022 federal election. Using this time frame, the last possible date for a half-Senate election to take place was Saturday 17 May 2025.

A double dissolution (a deadlock-breaking provision to dissolve both houses of parliament) cannot be called within six months before the date of the expiry of the House of Representatives. That means that any double dissolution of the 47th Parliament would have had to be granted by 24 January 2025. Allowing for the same stages indicated above, the last possible date for a double dissolution election would have been 29 March 2025. This can only occur if a bill that passes the House of Representatives is rejected by the Senate twice, at least three months apart.

=== Choice of election date ===
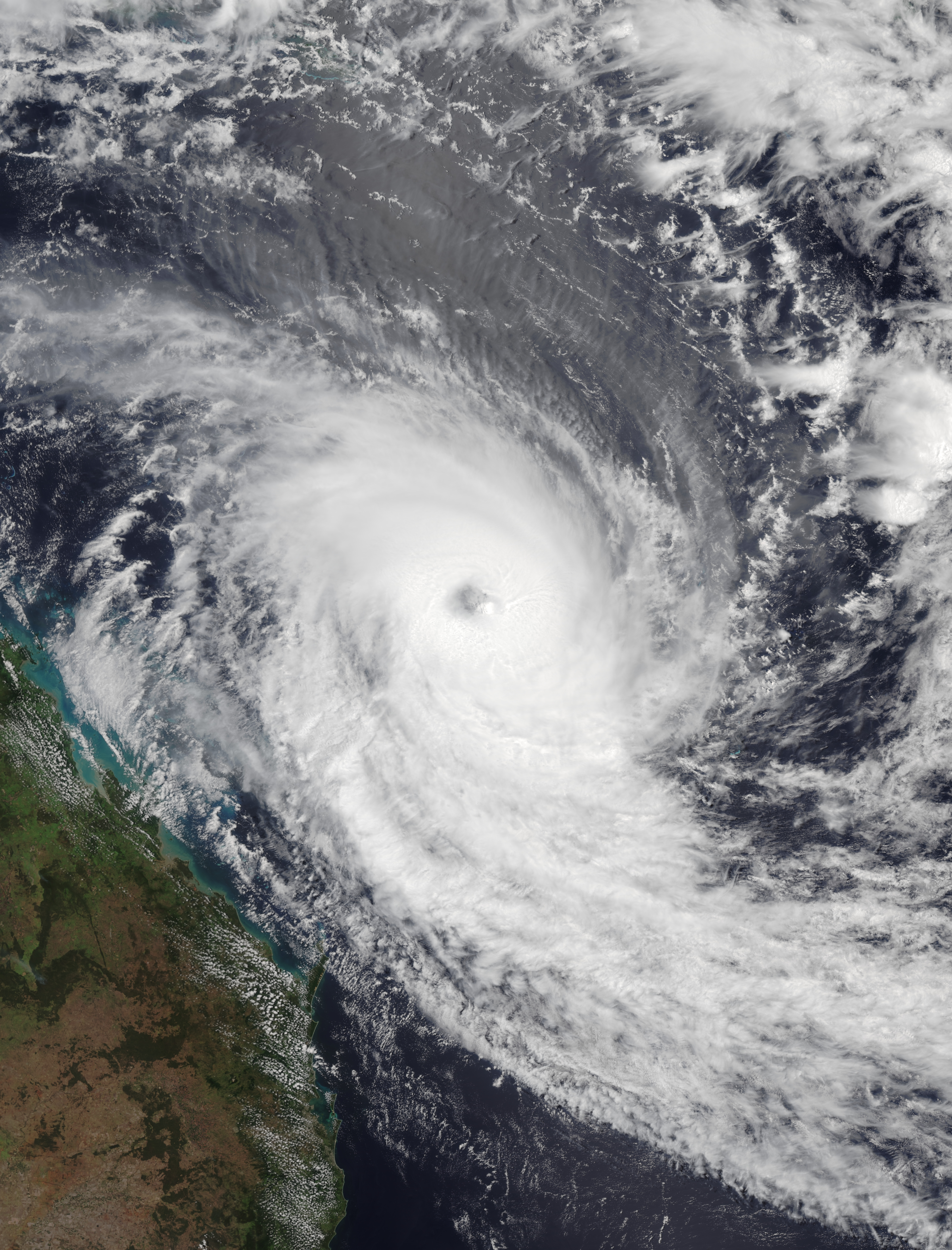
Cyclone Alfred in late February and early March 2025 was a factor in the choice of the election date

On 5 September 2024, during the announcement by NDIS and government services minister Bill Shorten of his impending retirement from politics, Prime Minister Anthony Albanese suggested that he may schedule the election to be held at a date later than Shorten's departure from Parliament in February 2025, while noting that the election was due by May 2025. Consideration had to be given to the Western Australian state election scheduled on 8 March 2025. Holding the federal election on that day would require the state election to be rescheduled to the following Saturday. Having the state and federal elections too close to each other was also not desirable; calling the election in early March for April would have required the 2025 Australian federal budget scheduled for 25 March to be postponed to after the election. To prevent the campaigns for the state and federal elections from clashing, the federal election would ideally have to be called after the state election. Accounting for the minimum 33 day campaign period, the earliest possible date for the election would then have been 12 April 2025.

Concurrent with increasing media speculation in the first week of March 2025 that Albanese might call the federal election for 12 April, it was forecast that Cyclone Alfred would make landfall in and impact south-east Queensland and northern New South Wales on or about 8 March (same date as the Western Australian state election). On 7 March, Albanese announced he had ruled out a 12 April election, and his government would deliver the budget on 25 March as scheduled. This was to prevent the need for Albanese to leave the recovery zone for Canberra to call the election, and to also prevent the announcement and start of an election campaign from clashing with dealing with the cyclone and recovery efforts. With the following April Saturdays of 19 and 26 April coinciding with significant nationwide long weekends, i.e. the Easter and Anzac Day public holidays, holding an election on those days would likely be problematic and unpopular. This left the Saturdays of 3 May, 10 May, or 17 May as the only plausible dates — of these, 3 May coincides with a long weekend in Queensland and the Northern Territory for Labour Day and May Day, respectively.

Ahead of the 2025 federal budget, there was speculation that Albanese would call the election either on the Friday or Sunday following the budget, with potential dates being 3 May or 10 May. This speculation intensified when rumours circulated that Albanese might announce the election as early as Friday 28 March, for one of these dates. On Thursday 27 March, the Department of Prime Minister and Cabinet accidentally posted, then deleted, a message to social media platform X (formerly Twitter), referring to the government being in "caretaker mode". This immediately fuelled speculation that the election would be called the very next morning. Several media outlets reported that they expected the election to be called for 3 May. As forecast, an election to be held on 3 May was called on 28 March, when Albanese visited Governor-General Sam Mostyn and advised her to prorogue Parliament and dissolve the House of Representatives, which she did.

== Election timeline ==
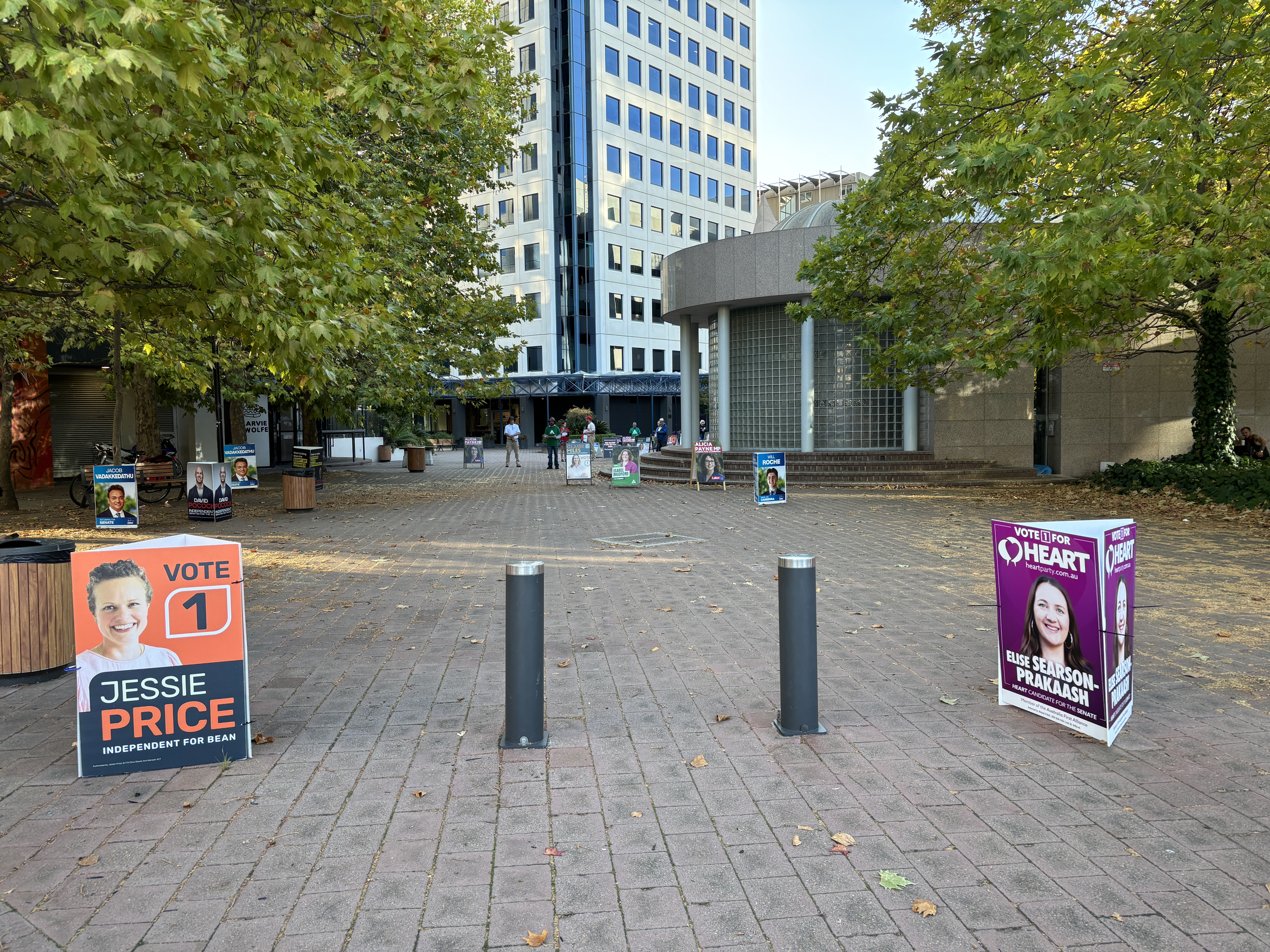
An early voting centre in Canberra on 24 April

The Australian Electoral Commission (AEC) stated that in accordance with the Commonwealth Electoral Act 1918, the key dates for this election were as follows:

- Issue of writs – Monday 31 March
- Close of rolls – 8 pm, Monday 7 April
- Close of nominations – noon, Thursday 10 April
- Declaration of nominations – noon, Friday 11 April
- Early voting opens – Tuesday 22 April
- Mobile voting opens – Tuesday 22 April
- Close of postal voting applications – 6 pm, Wednesday 30 April
- Polling day (8 am until 6 pm) – Saturday 3 May
- Final day for receipt of postal votes – Friday 16 May
- Return of the writs – Thursday 12 June
- Senators take their seats — 1 July
- First sitting of the newly elected 48th Parliament — Tuesday 22 July

Schedule two of the Broadcasting Services Act 1992 required that from midnight on 1 May until 3 May when polls close at 6 pm, the broadcasting of political statements on television is prohibited. This "blackout" period did not prohibit advertising on social media, newspapers, text message or email communications, or streaming services.

== Candidates ==
Some of the candidates for the division of Kooyong

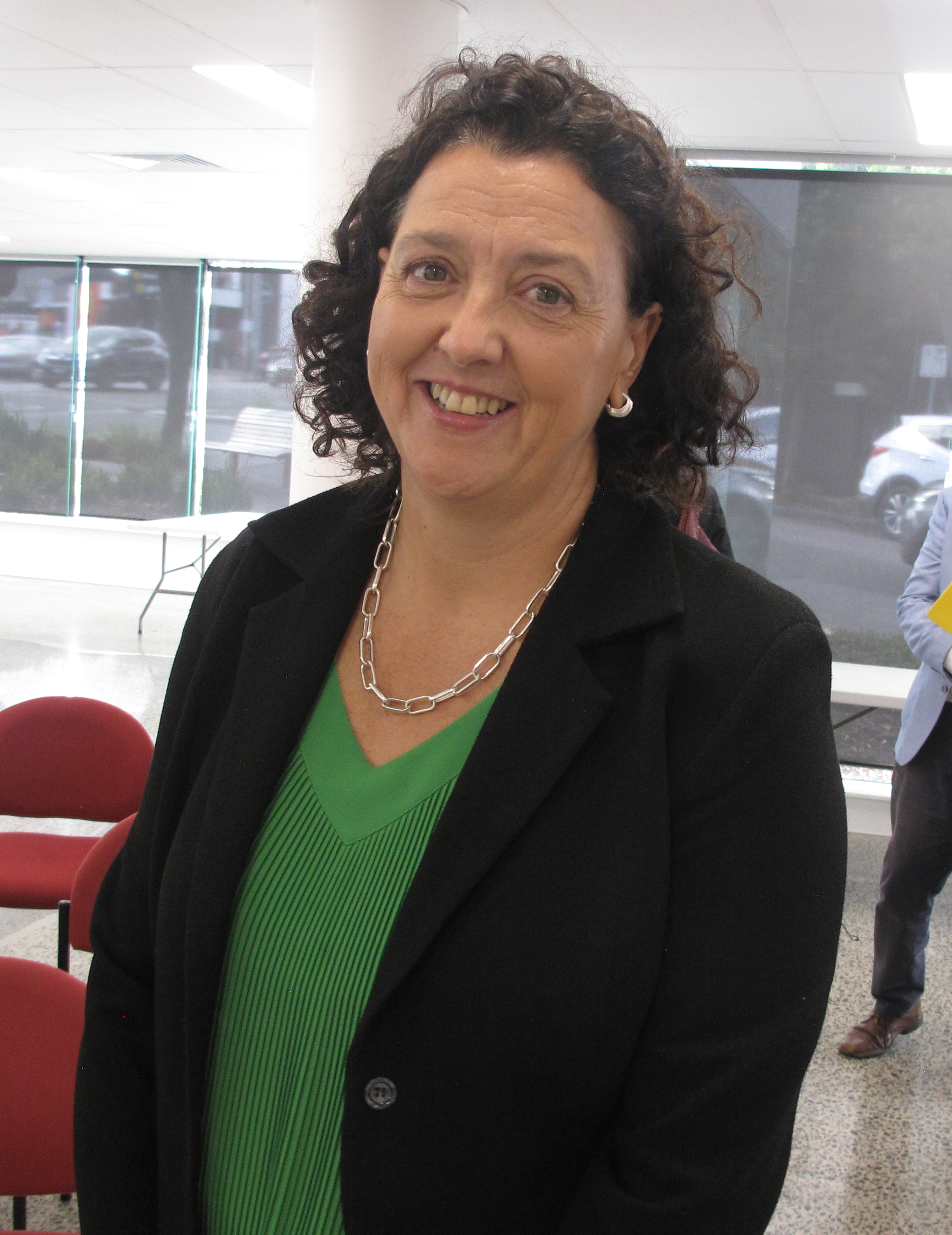
Monique Ryan, Independent (Incumbent, re-elected)

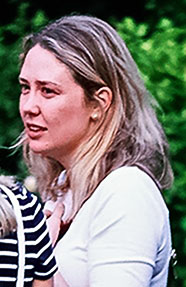
Amelia Hamer, Liberal

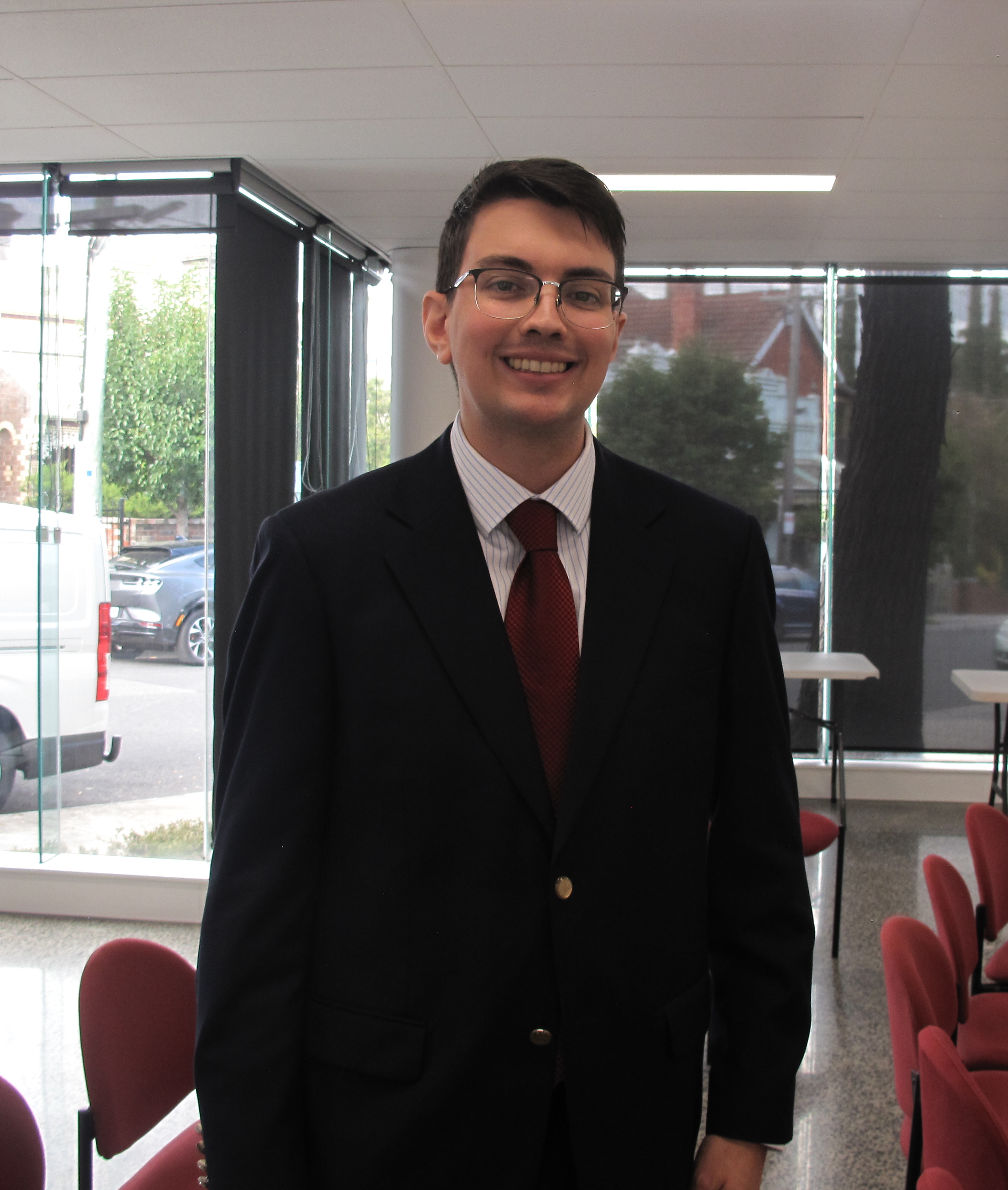
Clive Crosby, ALP

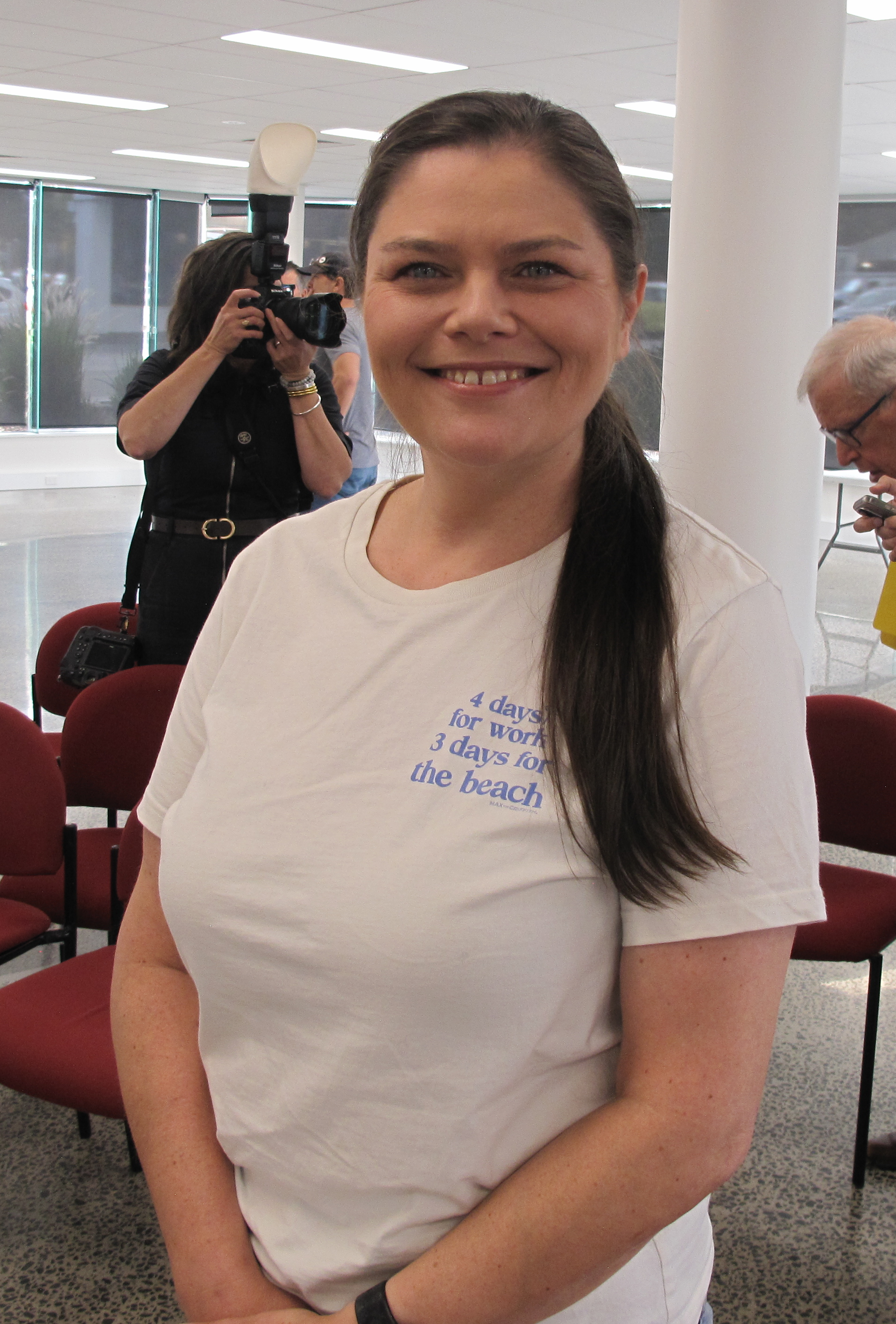
Jackie Carter, Greens

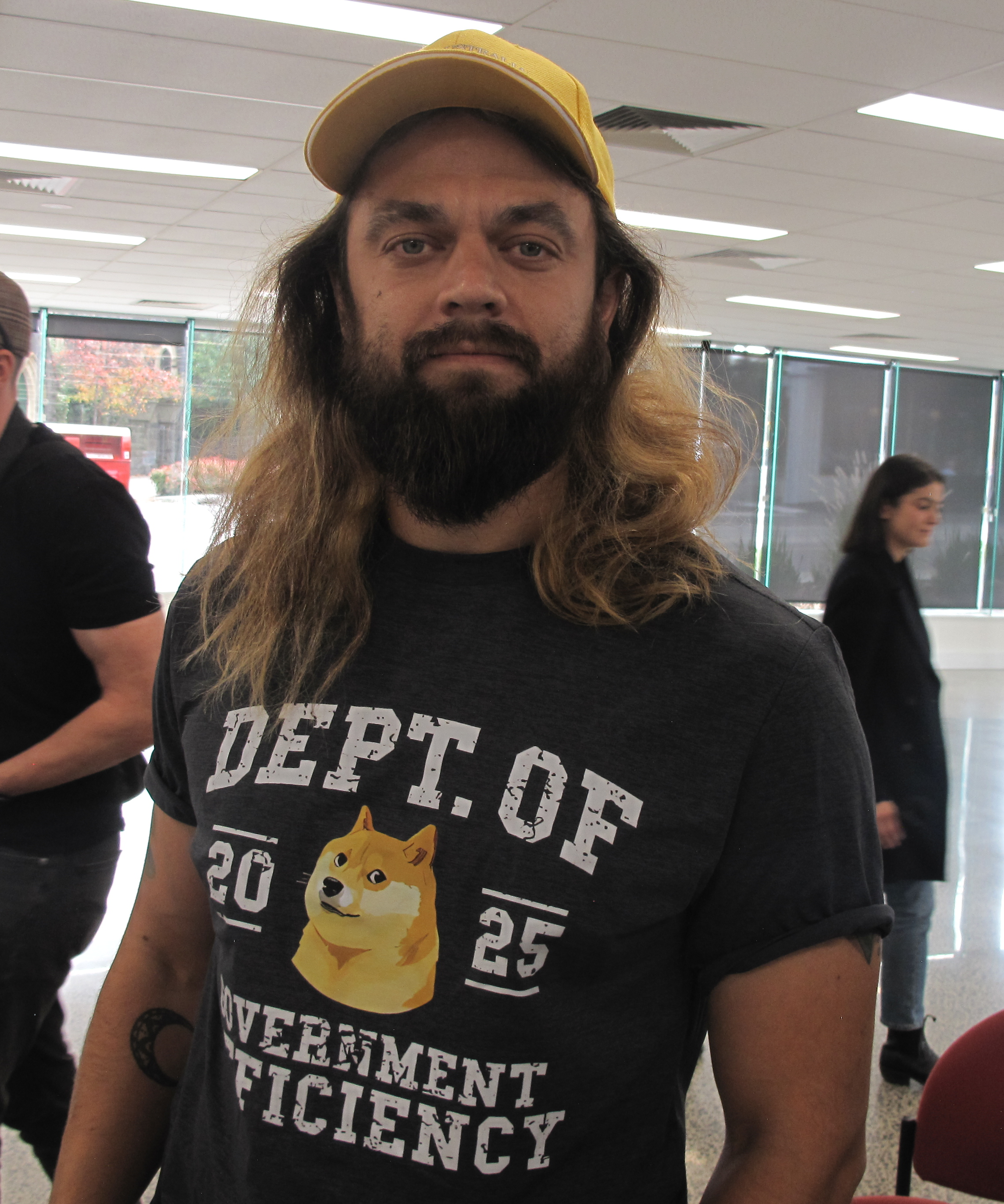
David Vader, TOP

A total of 1,456 candidates contested the election for the 48th Parliament of Australia, down from 1,624 in 2022. Of these, 1,126 stood for the 150 House of Representatives seats and 330 for the 40 Senate vacancies.

Women accounted for 38% of candidates, up from 29% in 2022. Following the election, women held 49.6% of all parliamentary seats, the highest level in Australian history, including 56.6% in the Senate. The Australian Labor Party fielded a female-majority slate, while the Australian Greens achieved gender parity. By contrast, just over one-third of Liberal–National Coalition candidates were women, and about one-quarter of Pauline Hanson's One Nation's candidates were women. Analysts noted that structural barriers persisted, with women still more likely to contest marginal or unwinnable electorates.

The youngest elected member was Labor's Charlotte Walker, who turned 21 on polling day and became the youngest senator in Australian history. The oldest returned member was Bob Katter who was re-elected in Kennedy at the age of 79.

Parliament also recorded its most diverse composition to date. Asian Australian representation rose to fourteen members, including newly elected Labor MPs Ash Ambihaipahar and Gabriel Ng, and Liberal Leon Rebello. Indigenous representation increased to eight members, making up 3.5% of parliament, slightly above the national population of 3.2% recorded at the 2021 census.

The most heavily contested electorates each attracted nine candidates, concentrated in regional New South Wales and Queensland, as well as Calwell in Victoria. By contrast, the least contested seats drew only four candidates, typically in safe Labor-held seats such as Bean and Fenner in the ACT, Franklin in Tasmania, Scullin in Victoria, and Fremantle in Western Australia.

== Retiring members ==
The seats of Hinkler (Queensland) and Maribyrnong (Victoria) were vacant at the time the federal election was called, following the resignation of Keith Pitt (Nationals) and Bill Shorten (Labor) on 19 and 20 January 2025 respectively. No by-elections were held for the seats due to their proximity to the general election.

=== Labor ===
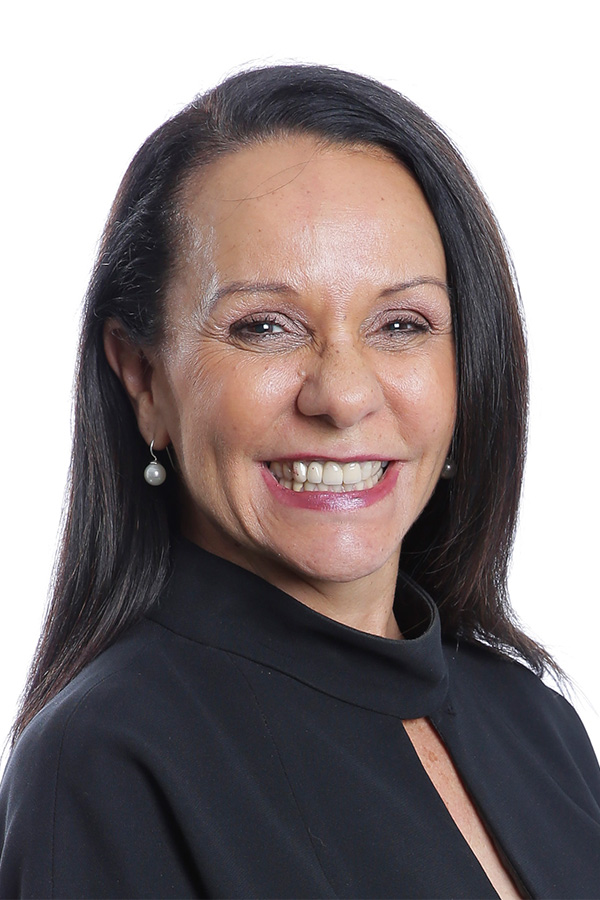
Linda Burney; Minister for Indigenous Australians (2022–2024) and the first Aboriginal woman member of the House of Representatives

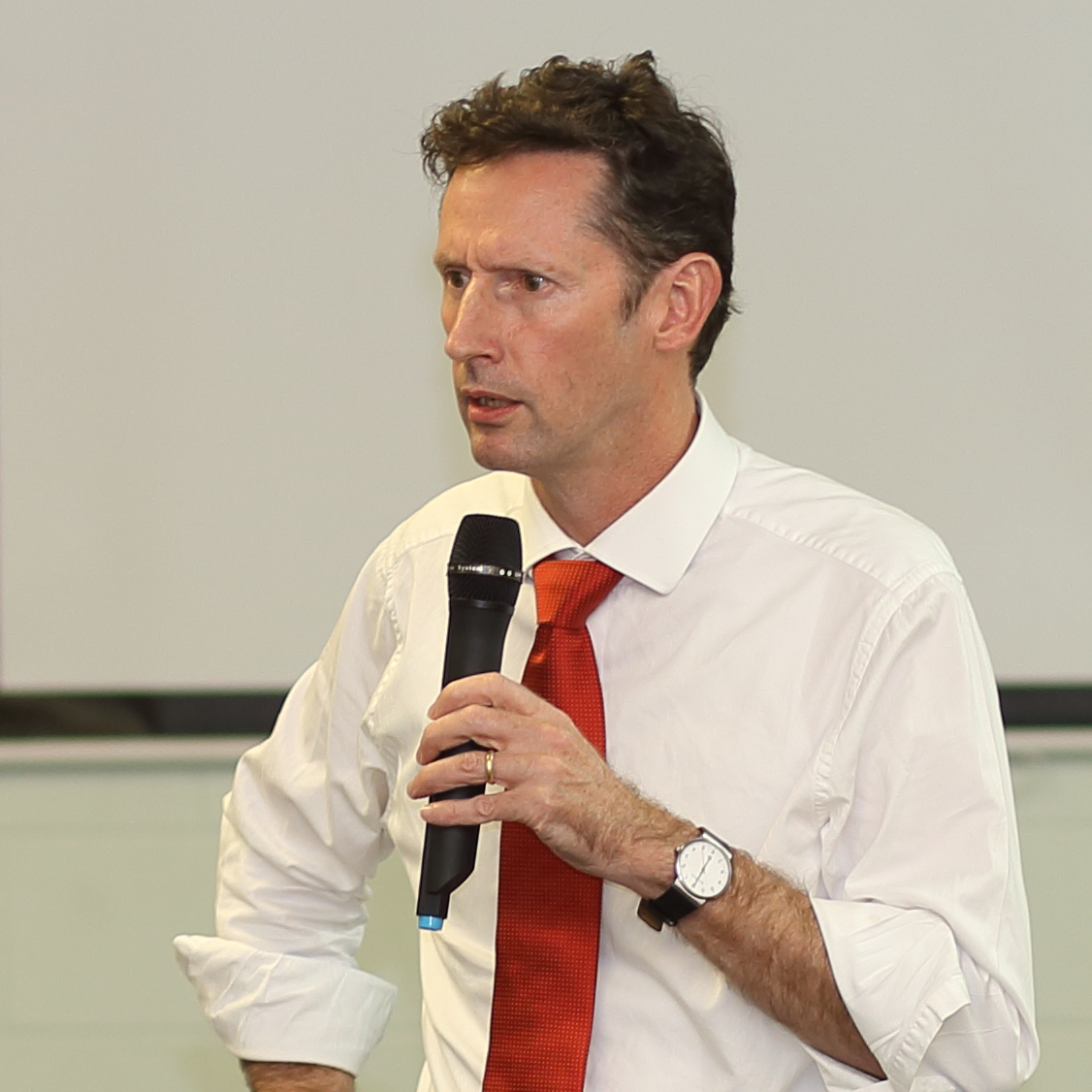
Stephen Jones; Assistant Treasurer of Australia and Minister for Financial Services (2022–2025)

- Linda Burney MP (Barton, NSW) – announced retirement on 25 July 2024
- Stephen Jones MP (Whitlam, NSW) – announced retirement on 30 January 2025
- Brian Mitchell MP (Lyons, Tas) – announced retirement on 15 November 2024
- Brendan O'Connor MP (Gorton, Vic) – announced retirement on 25 July 2024
- Graham Perrett MP (Moreton, Qld) – announced retirement on 22 August 2024
- Maria Vamvakinou MP (Calwell, Vic) – announced retirement on 9 June 2024
- Senator Catryna Bilyk (Tas) – announced retirement on 22 November 2024
- Senator Louise Pratt (WA) – announced retirement on 20 February 2024

=== Liberal ===
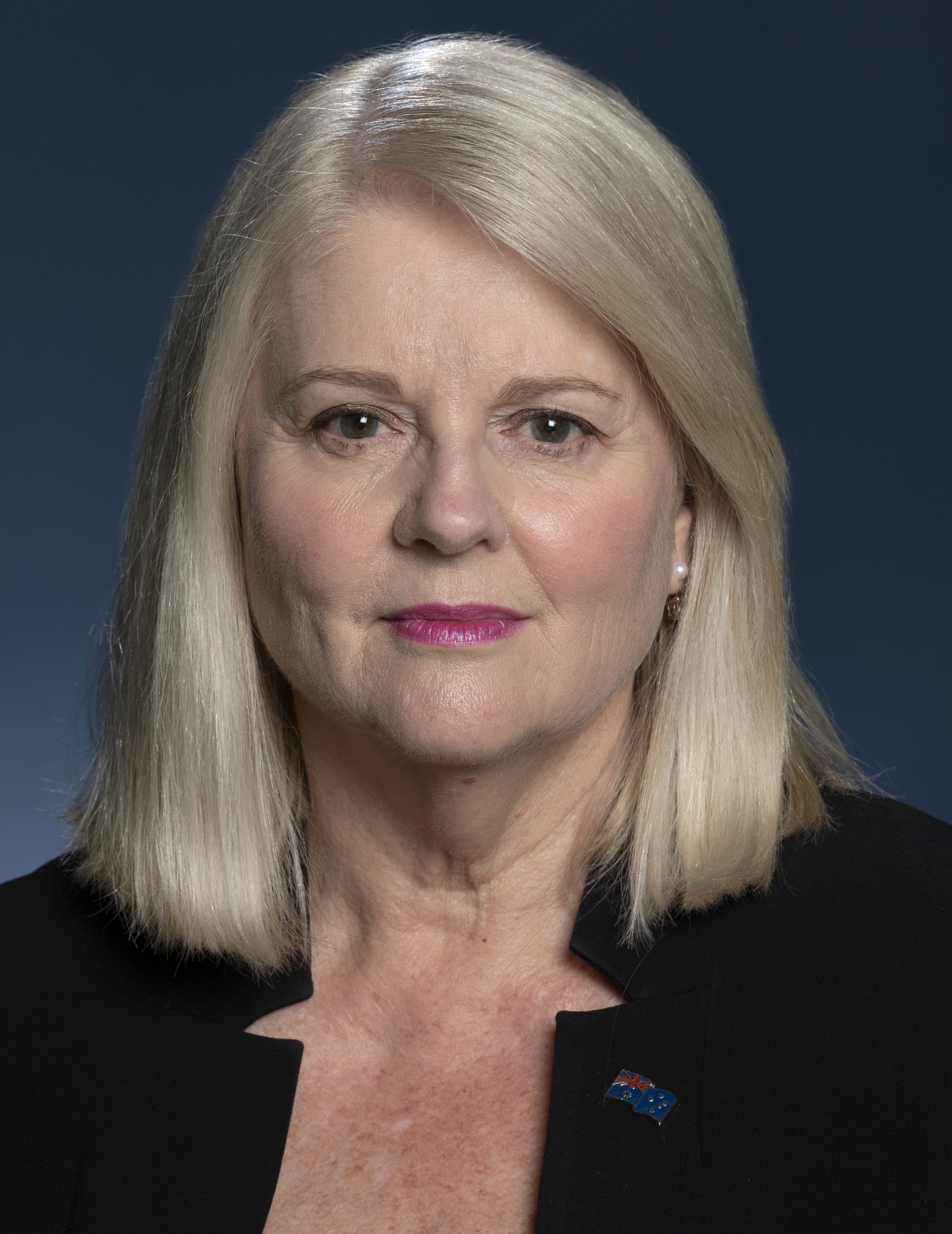
Karen Andrews; Minister for Industry, Science and Technology (2018–2021) and Minister for Home Affairs (2021–2022)

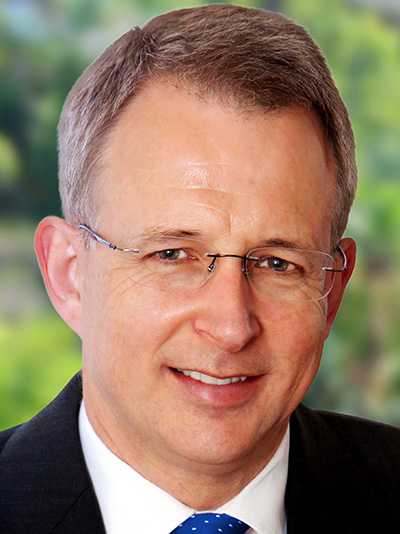
Paul Fletcher; Manager of Opposition Business in the House (2022–2025), minister of various portfolios (2015–2022)

- Karen Andrews MP (McPherson, Qld) – announced retirement on 18 April 2023
- Warren Entsch MP (Leichhardt, Qld) – announced retirement on 9 April 2023
- Paul Fletcher MP (Bradfield, NSW) – announced retirement on 10 December 2024
- Nola Marino MP (Forrest, WA) – announced retirement on 4 December 2023
- Gavin Pearce MP (Braddon, Tas) – announced retirement on 11 June 2024
- Rowan Ramsey MP (Grey, SA) – announced retirement on 25 March 2024
- Senator Linda Reynolds (WA) – announced retirement on 12 February 2024

=== Nationals ===
- Mark Coulton MP (Parkes, NSW) – announced retirement on 25 March 2024
- David Gillespie MP (Lyne, NSW) – announced retirement on 19 October 2024

=== Independent ===
- Kylea Tink MP (North Sydney, NSW; abolished) – announced retirement on 7 December 2024

== Campaign ==
Chart of the number of pre-poll votes cast for Australian federal elections from 2010 to 2025

January: Albanese and Dutton make public appearances which are interpreted by the media as unofficial campaign launches. Albanese visits electorates in Queensland, the Northern Territory and Western Australia. Prominent campaign issues are housing, cost of living, healthcare, nuclear and renewable energies, immigration, the public sector, the National Disability Insurance Scheme (NDIS), and defence. Dutton gives a speech in Melbourne where he launches the Liberal Party slogan for the campaign, "Let's get Australia back on track", and focuses on the topics of nuclear power, housing, and immigration.

February: Albanese announces that Labor would invest an additional $8.5 billion into Medicare to improve bulk billing rates.

1 March: Through a pledge of almost $650 million, Labor committed to setting up 50 new Medicare urgent care clinics. They have pledged that the clinics would be open by the middle of 2026.

13 March: Labor pledged to spend $1 billion on investigating new rail connections from the south-west of Sydney to the Western Sydney Airport.

19 March: Labor pledges to reduce the price of medicines listed on the PBS by $6.60 from $31.60 to $25.

25 March: Treasurer Jim Chalmers delivers the budget speech. A range of measures are announced, including an income tax cut that will apply to all Australian taxpayers. The Coalition opposes the tax cuts, instead offering a policy to cut the fuel excise by 25 cents per litre. Following the budget speech, the Greens announce a policy that aims to include environmental measures in the budget using 1% of total funds. The Coalition also promises to defund the Environmental Defenders Office, stating it had become a 'political football'.

28 March: An election to be held on 3 May is announced, following Albanese's visit to Mostyn to advise her to prorogue Parliament and dissolve the House of Representatives. The Parliament was then prorogued and the House of Representatives was dissolved, signalling the start of the official campaign.

29 March: Albanese and Dutton both campaign in Brisbane. Albanese begins his campaign in Dutton's electorate of Dickson, and Dutton begins in the division of Brisbane. Two of Dutton's events are disrupted by climate protesters, and a protester heckles Albanese at one of his events. Labor pledges to outlaw forms of price gouging by supermarkets, while announcing that it would also adopt all of the recommendations of the ACCC's supermarkets inquiry. Dutton remarks that "nobody" expects that Labor will form majority government.

30 March: Along with Western Australian premier Roger Cook, Albanese announces that a re-elected Labor government would seek to upgrade the St John of God Midland Hospital in Perth via an investment of $200 million. Dutton back-tracks on a proposal to hold three referendums on removing citizenship from dual nationals who commit certain crimes, to recognise Indigenous Australians in the Constitution, and to create four-year terms for parliament. Also at this press conference, Dutton promises to fund a security camera system for a mosque in western Sydney with $25,000.

31 March: A Chinese research vessel enters southern Australian maritime space. The Chinese navy had conducted live fire military exercises in waters east of Australia in February, including an incident where flares were released at an Australian air force plane, prompting the opposition to accuse the Albanese government of weakness. The appearance of the research vessel renews these criticisms from the opposition. Dutton comments during an interview that if he became prime minister, he would live at the office's secondary residence of Kirribilli House in Sydney, rather than its primary residence of The Lodge in Canberra. His comments are criticised as "hubris" and "measuring the curtains" by Labor figures.

1 April: The Reserve Bank of Australia announces it is keeping interest rates at 4.1%. Teal independent candidate for the seat of Bradfield Nicolette Boele is reportedly banned from a hairdressing salon for making a sexualised joke to a 19-year-old hair washer.

2 April: Shadow treasurer Angus Taylor gives his budget reply speech at the National Press Club, promoting Coalition policies on reducing natural gas prices and announcing a new investment body called "Investment Australia". Dutton pledges $6.2 million for Headspace in Melbourne at an event with psychiatrist Patrick McGorry. Albanese travels to Tasmania to announce an $8 million healthcare funding package. Chalmers describes Dutton as "very Doge" and of copying policy from the United States.

3 April: Albanese responds to Donald Trump's "Liberation Day" tariff on Australia's exported goods by unveiling a five-point plan to boost the local economy to counteract the United States' policy. Albanese stumbles after making a speech at a campaign event; weeks of discussion ensue about whether he technically "fell" or not, including comments from Dutton, posts on Coalition social media, and questions from journalists.

4 April: Both major parties pledge to return the Port Darwin to Australian ownership if elected.

5 April: During a visit to a community Australian rules football (AFL) ground in Darwin, Dutton accidentally strikes a Network 10 cameraman with a football, knocking the camera into his head and cutting him.

6 April: The Liberal Party disendorses its candidate for the Division of Whitlam, Benjamin Britton, due to previous disparaging comments he made towards service by women in the military. Dutton also announces a Coalition policy to cap international university student numbers to 240,000 and raise visa prices for students. The Greens call this policy proposal a "cynical attempt to scapegoat migrants and international students". Dutton previously said that this policy proposal aims to get the "woke" out of the university and schooling system.

7 April: The Coalition backflips on a proposed policy to end work from home arrangements for the public sector workforce and drops their demands for mass job cuts in the public sector. Also on this day, the stock market falls sharply due to the risk of the tariffs imposed by the Trump administration, with Chalmers stating that Australia is "uniquely placed" to deal with the impacts of these tariffs.

8 April: Albanese is heckled by a climate protester while announcing a $1 billion investment for Medicare. The announcement included a boost in the number of mental health centres funded through Medicare and increased services for young people. Also on this day, Sky News and The Daily Telegraph hold the first leaders election debate between Albanese and Dutton in a People's Forum. Albanese is declared the winner of the Forum with 44 votes compared to 35 for Dutton, and 21 undecided votes out of a possible 100. Liberal and National Party social media however incorrectly congratulate Dutton for winning the debate. It is later revealed that Dutton's father had been taken to hospital following a heart attack shortly before the debate began, and Dutton had considered pulling out of the debate.

9 April: On a visit to Leichhardt in Far North Queensland, Albanese announces that Labor would commit $490 million worth of funds to upgrade the Barron River Bridge. Sky News and The Daily Telegraph co-host the first treasurers election debate between Chalmers and shadow treasurer Angus Taylor in their second people's forum of the campaign. Chalmers opens the debate by highlighting the challenging economic circumstances faced by Labor upon taking office, and the steps they had taken to improve the situation since. Taylor opens with the Coalition's established line of attack, claiming that Australians were worse off than three years prior. Chalmers defends the government's fiscal record, pointing to a $207 billion improvement in the budget bottom line. Energy policy, particularly gas, emerges as a major point of contention during the debate. The Coalition claims its plan would reduce household gas bills by 7%, based on modelling conducted by Frontier Economics; however, the analysis is brief—comprising just 135 words on power prices—and is criticised by climate change and energy minister Chris Bowen as a "scamphlet". Coalition energy spokesperson Ted O'Brien later acknowledges that any savings were "likely to be a lagging indicator," suggesting consumers might not experience immediate benefits.

10 April: The Coalition announces a policy to establish a regional Australia future fund to invest $20 billion in regional infrastructure and services, the fund would be topped-up using commodity royalties, and another fund to pay down debt and finance infrastructure projects. They also propose abolishing a scheme that Labor set up in government to build renewable energy infrastructure, and propose ending the housing Australia future fund and the national reconstruction fund. Also on this day, a debate between the minister for climate change and energy Chris Bowen and his shadow counterpart Ted O'Brien takes place at the National Press Club. The event is hosted by Tom Connell of Sky News. During O'Brien's opening remarks, he is interrupted by a climate change activist. The Coalition also announce a policy to repeal penalties for the sale of fuel-inefficient vehicles, instead proposing to re-work the law.

12 April: Coalition senator Jacinta Nampijinpa Price vows to "make Australia great again" and accuses the media of being "obsessed with Donald Trump" in a speech to Liberal Party supporters.

13 April: Labor and the Coalition hold their official campaign launches. Labor's is in Perth, and the Coalition's is in Liverpool in western Sydney. The Labor Party announces several new policies such as a $1,000 tax deduction for work-related expenses and that the government would fund 100,000 new homes exclusively for first-home buyers with a $10 billion investment, and an expansion of the help to buy scheme. The Coalition announces that they would allow first-home buyers who purchase new builds to deduct interest from their mortgage payments on the first $650,000 for five years, with the proposed scheme being means-tested. Dutton recommits the party to a previously announced policy for homebuyers to access up to $50,000 of their superannuation to purchase a first-home. Dutton announces a tax break to counter cost-of-living pressures which would apply to those earning up to $144,000, with Dutton claiming that the policy would mean these earners are $1,200 better off at the end of the year.

14 April: Labor announces a $10 million investment to improve medical services for LGBTQ people. A Family First candidate contesting the election for Longman in Queensland, Malachi Brogden Hearne, is disendorsed by the party's leadership due to his derogatory posts on social media. Also on this day, the Greens began a campaign to retain the seat of Brisbane by promising free school lunches at a cost of $11.6 billion.

15 April: Labor announces a $3.8 million package to keep a Canberra health centre from falling into administration. The military information website Janes claims that Russia is interested in setting up an aircraft base in Indonesia. However, the Indonesian foreign minister stridently denied this claim. Dutton states it would be a "catastrophic failure" of diplomacy if Albanese and foreign minister Penny Wong did not combat this issue. Also on this day, Greens leader Adam Bandt announces policies that would be a priority for the party if the election results in a hung parliament. These policies would include aiming to get dental into Medicare, lowering the price of child care, ending native forest logging, and Bandt reiterates a policy to wind back some tax concessions.

16 April: A Greens candidate for the division of Franklin in Tasmania ceases campaigning due to revelations that he holds dual citizenship. As nominations had already closed he would still appear on the ballot paper as a Greens member. The Australian Broadcasting Corporation (ABC) holds a leaders debate between Albanese and Dutton moderated by Insiders host David Speers.

17 April: Dutton announces a long-term aspiration to index tax brackets. Albanese criticises this policy. Later on this day, a debate takes place on the ABC's 7.30 program between housing minister Clare O'Neil and shadow housing minister Michael Sukkar.

19 April: Trumpet of Patriots holds their official campaign launch in Queensland, with the slogan Make Australia Great Again. The party proposes the creation of a department of government efficiency and cutting immigration. Chairman of the party Clive Palmer proposes abolishing net-zero targets set as per the Paris Climate Agreement. The party also proposes building high-speed rail and capping interest rates at 3%. Also on this day, Albanese announces that Labor would enshrine penalty rates via legislation.

20 April: The Greens announces their requests during negotiation in a hung parliament, which include seeking changes to negative gearing and the capital gains tax. The former secretary of the department of home affairs Mike Pezzullo is floated for reappointment into a public service role by Dutton.

21 April: The Coalition announces a policy to trial a sex offender registry; while Dutton announces a further investment to fight crime. Jason Smart, a Trumpet of Patriots candidate for the division of Flinders in Victoria resigns from the party due to disagreements with its leadership but would still appear on the ballot paper due to nominations having previously closed.

21 April: Following the death of Pope Francis, both Albanese and Dutton briefly suspend their campaigns, as a mark of respect. Labor announce that they would fund a Canberra-based aged care facility with $10 million following the ACT government's announcement that it would close. Labor announce a strategy to prevent domestic violence through a range of responses to stop perpetrators from hijacking a victim's finances. 47,000 anonymous pamphlets are distributed in the Division of Wentworth critical of the incumbent MP Allegra Spender. The AEC would launch legal proceedings against the distributor in the Federal Court in October 2025. Later that evening, the Nine Network hold a leaders debate between Albanese and Dutton moderated by A Current Affair presenter Allison Langdon and with the leaders questioned by Charles Croucher, Deb Knight and Phil Coorey. The panel declare that Dutton narrowly won the debate.

23 April: The Coalition announce a policy to increase defence spending to 2.5% of GDP within five years, and then to 3% within the next decade. The Coalition later announce a policy to repeal tax breaks for electric vehicles, in addition to student debt relief and production tax credits. Also on this day, the Labor Party announces that they would fund a scheme designed to fast-track qualifications in order to help people get into trades work sooner. The Coalition announce a pledge to create a database of domestic violence offenders in a package worth $90 million; part of this package also includes a royal commission investigating sexual abuse in Indigenous communities. Details of a Coalition policy to create a special envoy position for jailed Australians abroad are revealed by The Sydney Morning Herald.

24 April: Albanese announces that Labor would create a strategic minerals reserve to be fully operational by late 2026 through an investment of $1.2 billion. The Coalition confirm their plan to cut over 41,000 public service workers would be limited to Canberra. The Australian Electoral Commission announces that more than 1.7 million Australians have already voted at pre-polling centres. William Bay, a candidate for the Great Australian Party running for the Senate in Queensland, resigns from the party due to his disapproval of the party leadership's actions regarding the use of money and undermining of his campaign. As nominations had already closed, he would still appear on the ballot paper as a Great Australian Party candidate.

25 April: The leaders pause campaigning in order to make time for Anzac Day commemorations.

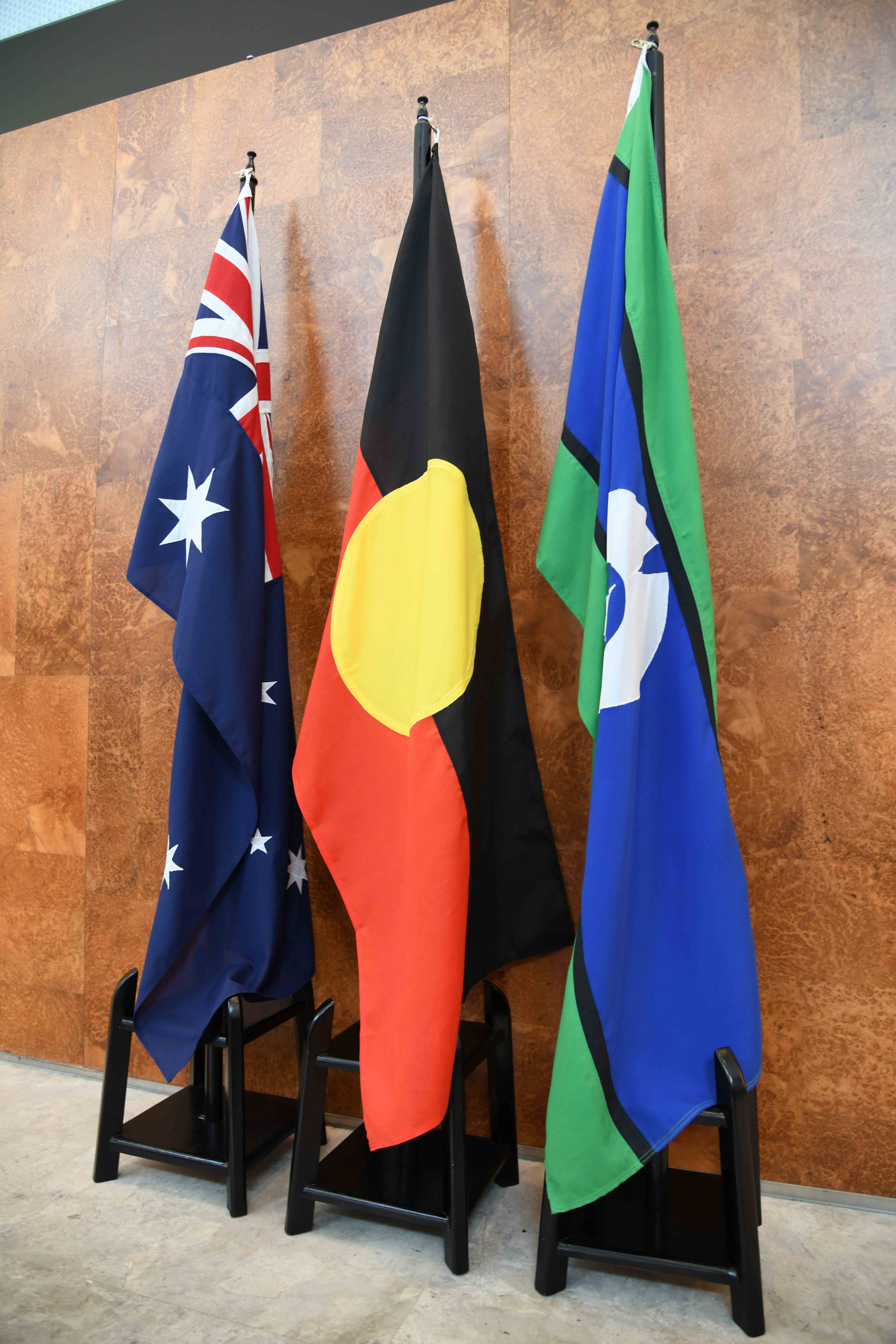
The three flags of Australia on display. Dutton made comments prior to and throughout the campaign that he would only stand in front of the Australian flag (left) as Prime Minister.

26 April: Albanese commits the Labor Party to further funding schools with $25 million to maintain knowledge of under-represented languages in Australian society. Dutton states he would seek to unite people "under one flag [exclusively the Australian flag, without the Australian Aboriginal flag and Torres Strait Islander flag]", while stating that he thinks respect should be shown for Welcome to Country ceremonies following an incident at an Anzac Day event. Albanese states that he would convene a meeting with representatives from the media after the election to discuss issues relating to the spread of extremist material. Fatima Payman holds the campaign launch for her party, Australia's Voice, in Bankstown, New South Wales.

27 April: Albanese announces a policy to expand Medicare after-hours care with an investment of $204 million. The Coalition announce that they consider charging electric vehicle users a road charge to compensate for the loss of fuel levies. At a Liberal Party event in Victoria, Dutton brands The Guardian and ABC News as "hate media". The Seven Network holds a leaders debate between Albanese and Dutton moderated by Seven News reporter Mark Riley and hosted by Sunrise presenter Natalie Barr. A panel of 60 undecided voters assembled by pollster Roy Morgan declare Albanese the overall winner of the debate with 50% of the votes, with Dutton winning 25% of the votes and 25% remaining undecided; several other topics are also polled. Dutton states that he believes Welcome to Country ceremonies are overdone but that they are "the respectful thing to do" for some events.

28 April: Chalmers and Minister for Finance Katy Gallagher release the Labor Party's pre-election costings while announcing that student visa fees would rise to pay for extra spending. This leads to calls from S&P Global Ratings warning that Australia's credit rating could be downgraded unless spending was restrained. Dutton states that he does not believe Anzac Day services should involve a Welcome to Country ceremony.

29 April: Labor announce a $2 billion fund to enable state governments to partially fund the construction of new homes. A press conference held by Dutton is interrupted by anti-nuclear protestors in Sanctuary Point. Another Trumpet of Patriots candidate, Mark Aldridge, who was contesting the division of Makin in South Australia, resigns in protest over the party's use of text message communications to voters. Because nominations have already closed, Aldridge's name would still appear as a ToP candidate on ballot papers.

30 April: Dutton accuses Labor of trying to resurrect the failed Voice to Parliament proposal following Wong's statement that people in ten years would say "Did we even have an argument about that?". Wong later tells SBS News that "the voice is gone", and Albanese puts out a similar statement. New statistics reveal that the headline rate of inflation is stagnant at 2.4% and trimmed mean inflation has fallen to 2.9%. Chalmers welcomes this news. The Liberal Party announces that they would take Boroondara City Council to court due to the council's intention to remove their candidate Amelia Hamer's signage. The Greens officially launch their campaign later in the day. Albanese delivers a speech and takes questions at the National Press Club. Dutton announces a policy to fund infrastructure projects further in the Indo-Pacific region.

1 May: The Coalition release their policy costings, revealing they would institute a tax on vapes and assist the creation of a Jewish Arts Quarter in Melbourne to be funded by the cutting of funding to Creative Australia. Budget deficits would be higher under the Coalition's costings for the first two years of office, but be lower after four years. The AEC announces that more than 4.8 million votes have already been cast at pre-poll centres across the country.

3 May: About 8.5 million early votes across all types (postal, in person, and mobile teams) were cast prior to election day.

=== Preferences ===
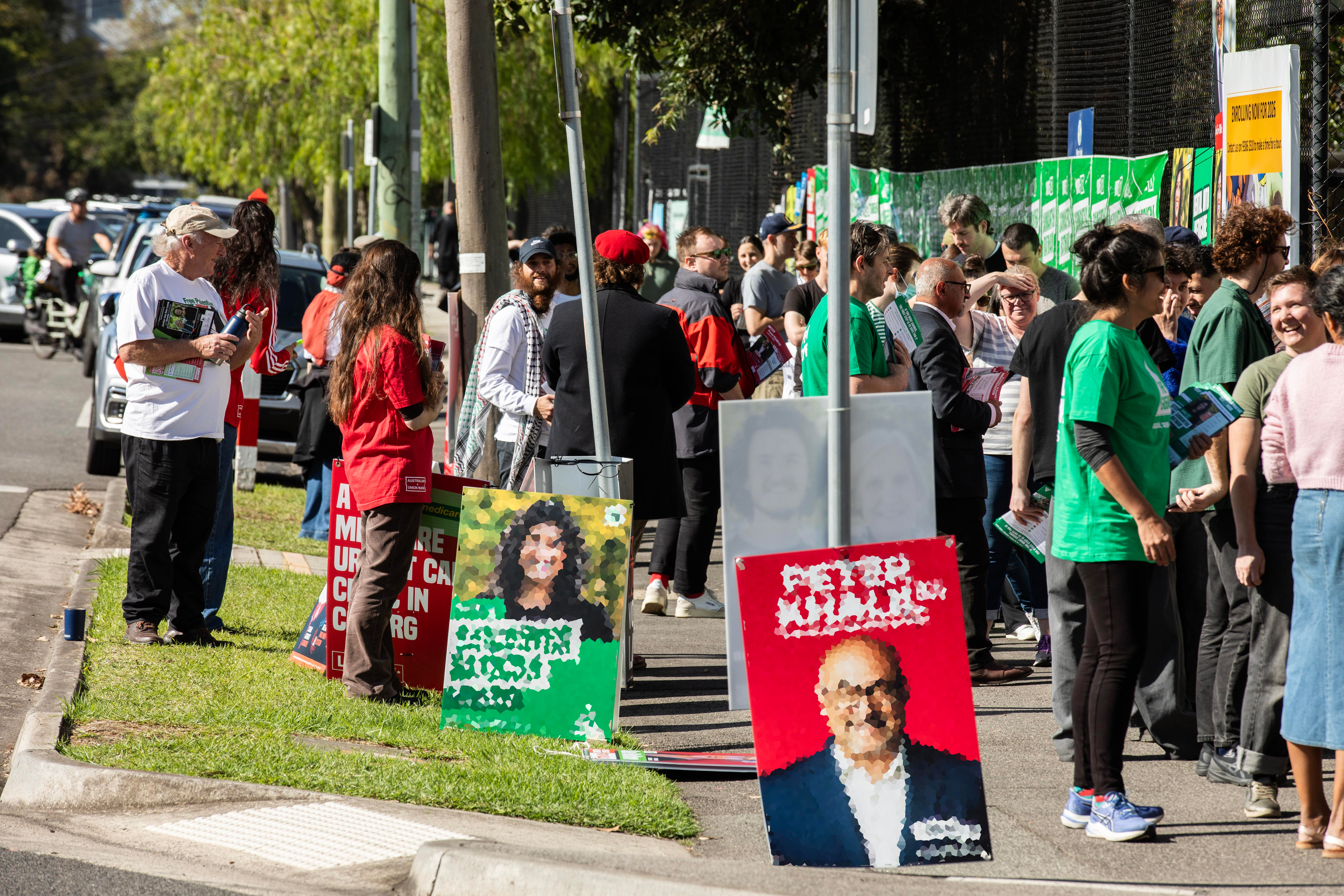
A polling place in the division of Wills with material for Labor's Peter Khalil and the Greens' Samantha Ratnam

As is tradition in Australian elections, several parties recommended voters' preferences be directed to certain candidates. The Coalition recommended voters direct their second preference votes to the One Nation candidate or the Libertarian candidate. One Nation also chose to preference Coalition candidates second in some seats. In electorates where the Liberal and National parties were running against each other, the National candidate in these areas recommended preferences be directed to the Liberal candidate second, then preferences recommended to One Nation, with Labor and the Greens candidates usually last. Teal independent candidates supported by Climate 200 generally did not recommend preferences.

The Labor Party chose to preference the Greens second in most seats; in the Melbourne seat of Macnamara, Labor ran an "open ticket" and did not recommend preferences due to the Greens' pro-Palestinian leanings and the seat having a large Jewish population. The Greens directed voters to preference Australia's Voice, pro-Palestinian candidates, and teal independents higher than Labor. The Greens also chose to preference Labor higher than the Coalition in every seat that they contested. Trumpet of Patriots recommended voters preference incumbent candidates last in most seats; in Bennelong they recommended preferencing the incumbent Labor candidate Jerome Laxale above the Liberal candidate Scott Yung, and preferenced incumbent teal independents below Liberal candidates.

=== Endorsements ===
Parties and individual candidates received endorsements from media organisations and prominent individuals. A majority of the News Corp mastheads endorsed the Coalition as well as The Nightly. Labor was endorsed by The Sydney Morning Herald and The Age. Guardian Australia and The Saturday Paper endorsed Labor only as a minority government.

== Opinion polling ==
A variety of polling organisations conducted nationwide and electorate-specific opinion polling for the election. Overall, polls underestimated support for Labor and overestimated support for the Coalition. The Coalition's own pollster Freshwater Strategy projected a 51–49 2PP result, significantly lower than the 55.22–44.78 final result.

=== Primary vote ===
Local regression graph of polls conducted since the 2022 election

=== Two-party preferred ===
Local regression graph of polls conducted since the 2022 election

== Results ==
The incumbent Australian Labor Party government was re-elected for a second term, winning 94 of the 150 seats in the House of Representatives. This was a net gain of 17 seats from the previous election and equalled the Liberal–National Coalition's tally at the 1996 election. Nationally, Labor secured 55.22% of the two-party-preferred vote. The Coalition fell to 43 seats, a loss of 15, with Opposition Leader Peter Dutton defeated in his electorate of Dickson. The Australian Greens were reduced to a single seat in Ryan. The non-Greens crossbench consisted of 12 members, the same number as elected in 2022, and comprised 10 independents alongside Rebekah Sharkie and Bob Katter. In the Senate, no party achieved a majority: Labor increased its representation to 28 seats (a gain of three), while the Coalition dropped to 27 (a loss of three). The Greens retained 11 seats, and the remaining eight crossbench seats were divided among minor parties and independents, including four from Pauline Hanson's One Nation, which gained two seats.

The election saw the highest number of women elected to both chambers of parliament in Australian history.

98.2% of eligible Australians were enrolled to cast a ballot during this election. Youth enrolment was lower at about 92%. Indigenous enrolment was estimated at 92.9% in 2024. Turnout was estimated at 90.7%.

=== House of Representatives ===
Government (94) Labor (94) Opposition (43) Liberal–National Coalition: Liberal (28) (Note: 10 members of the Liberal National Party of Queensland sit in the Liberal party room and 6 in the National party room) National (15) Crossbench (13) Independent (10) Greens (1) Centre Alliance (1) Katter's Australian (1)

House of Representatives (IRV) – Turnout 90.70% (CV)
Party	Primary Vote			Seats	
Party	Votes	%	Swing (pp)	Seats	Change
Labor	5,354,138	34.56	+1.98	94	▲17
Liberal–National Coalition	4,929,402	31.82	−3.88	43	▼15
Liberal	3,205,216	20.69	−3.20	18	▼9
Liberal National (Qld)	1,099,623	7.10	−0.90	16	▼5
National	588,778	3.80	+0.20	9	▼1
Country Liberal (NT)	35,785	0.23	+0.03	0	Steady
Greens	1,889,977	12.20	−0.05	1	▼3
One Nation	991,814	6.40	+1.44	0	Steady
Trumpet of Patriots	296,076	1.91	+1.52 (Note: Compared to Australian Federation Party results at the 2022 federal election. The party's campaign was funded by and strongly associated with Clive Palmer at this election - the result is a -2.21% swing compared to the 2022 result of Palmer's since deregistered United Australia Party.)	0	Steady
Family First	273,681	1.77	+1.77 (Note: New party)	0	Steady
Legalise Cannabis	186,335	1.20	+1.16	0	Steady
Libertarian	83,474	0.54	−1.19 (Note: Compared to Liberal Democratic Party results at the 2022 federal election.)	0	Steady
People First	71,892	0.46	+0.46	0	Steady
Katter's Australian	51,775	0.33	−0.05	1	Steady
Centre Alliance	37,453	0.24	−0.01	1	Steady
Animal Justice	35,312	0.23	−0.37	0	Steady
Christians	31,365	0.20	+0.06	0	Steady
Shooters, Fishers, Farmers	26,968	0.17	+0.04	0	Steady
Victorian Socialists	23,652	0.15	−0.04	0	Steady
Citizens	20,770	0.13	+0.10	0	Steady
Socialist Alliance	18,653	0.12	+0.04	0	Steady
FUSION	14,374	0.09	+0.00	0	Steady
Indigenous-Aboriginal	6,306	0.04	−0.01	0	Steady
HEART	5,138	0.03	−0.15	0	Steady
Great Australian	1,509	0.01	−0.20	0	Steady
Democrats	688	0.00	+0.00	0	Steady
Independents	1,126,051	7.27	+1.98	10	Steady
Not affiliated	13,433	0.09	+0.08	0	Steady
Total	15,490,236			150	▼1
Two-party-preferred vote
Labor	8,553,231	55.22	+3.09		
Liberal–National Coalition	6,937,005	44.78	−3.09		
Informal votes	919,512	5.60	+0.41		
Turnout	16,409,748	90.70	+0.88		
Registered voters	18,091,591	–	–		
Source: AEC, ABC

Primary vote
Labor	34.56%
Coalition	31.82%
Greens	12.20%
Independents	7.27%
One Nation	6.40%
Trumpet of Patriots	1.91%
Others	5.84%

Two-party preferred vote
Labor	55.22%
Coalition	44.78%

Seats
Labor	62.67%
Coalition	28.67%
Independents	6.67%
Greens	0.67%
Katter's Australian	0.67%
Centre Alliance	0.67%

=== Seats changing hands ===
Members in italics did not recontest their seats.

Seat	2022			Notional margin (Note: For seats that were affected by the redistribution, the Australian Electoral Commission calculated "notional" margins for the redistributed divisions by modelling the outcome of the previous election as if the new boundaries had been in place.)	Swing	2025		
Seat	Party	Member	Margin	Notional margin	Swing	Margin	Member	Party
Banks, NSW	Liberal	David Coleman	3.20	2.64	5.0	2.4	Zhi Soon	Labor
Bass, TAS	Liberal	Bridget Archer	1.43	1.43	9.4	7.9	Jess Teesdale	Labor
Bonner, QLD	Liberal National	Ross Vasta	3.41	3.41	8.4	5.0	Kara Cook	Labor
Braddon, TAS	Liberal	Gavin Pearce	8.03	8.03	15.2	7.2	Anne Urquhart	Labor
Bradfield, NSW	Liberal	Paul Fletcher	4.2 v IND	2.5 v IND	3.4	0.01	Nicolette Boele	Independent
Brisbane, QLD	Greens	Stephen Bates	3.7 v LNP	3.6 v LNP	59.0 (Note: Labor came in third place at the 2022 federal election.)	9.0	Madonna Jarrett	Labor
Deakin, VIC	Liberal	Michael Sukkar	0.19	0.02	2.8	2.8	Matt Gregg	Labor
Dickson, QLD	Liberal National	Peter Dutton	1.70	1.70	7.8	6.1	Ali France	Labor
Forde, QLD	Liberal National	Bert van Manen	4.23	4.23	6.0	1.8	Rowan Holzberger	Labor
Goldstein, VIC	Independent	Zoe Daniel	3.04	3.1	3.4	0.1	Tim Wilson	Liberal
Griffith, QLD	Greens	Max Chandler-Mather	10.5 v LNP	10.5 v LNP	60.6	10.6 v GRN	Renee Coffey	Labor
Hughes, NSW	Liberal	Jenny Ware	7.01	3.5	6.4	3.0	David Moncrieff	Labor
Leichhardt, QLD	Liberal National	Warren Entsch	3.44	3.44	9.6	6.1	Matt Smith	Labor
Melbourne, VIC	Greens	Adam Bandt	10.15	6.5	9.5	3.0	Sarah Witty	Labor
Menzies, VIC	Liberal	Keith Wolahan	0.7	–0.4 (Note: Had become a notional Labor seat as a result of the redistribution.)	0.7	1.1	Gabriel Ng	Labor
Moore, WA	Independent	Ian Goodenough (Note: Ian Goodenough was elected as the Liberal MP for Moore at the 2022 federal election but resigned from Liberal Party following preselection defeat in the lead up to the 2025 election.)	0.66	0.91	3.9	3.0	Tom French	Labor
Petrie, QLD	Liberal National	Luke Howarth	4.44	4.44	5.6	1.1	Emma Comer	Labor
Sturt, SA	Liberal	James Stevens	0.45	0.45	7.1	6.6	Claire Clutterham	Labor

=== Senate ===
Government (28) Labor (28) Opposition (27) Coalition Liberal (20) LNP (Qld) (4) (Note: Two LNP senators sit in the National party room and two sit in the Liberal party room) National (2) CLP (NT) (1) (Note: The CLP senator, Jacinta Nampijinpa Price, sat in the National party room, though changed allegiance to the Liberals shortly after the election.) Crossbench (18) Greens (11) One Nation (4) Lambie Network (1) United Australia (1) Independent (1)

Senate (STV) – Turnout 90.68% (CV)
Group (Note: Parties and candidates may run together in one group, where group votes are allocated top-down within that group.)	First preference			Seats			
Group	Votes	%	Swing (pp)	Seats won	Not up	New total	+/−
Labor	5,573,028	35.11	+5.02	16	12	28	▲3
Liberal–National Coalition	4,744,580	29.89	−4.35	13	14	27	▼3
Liberal/Nationals (joint)	2,756,296	17.37	−2.56	4	5	9	▼1
Liberal National (QLD)	997,404	6.28	−0.78	2	2	4	Steady
Liberal	892,188	5.62	−1.38	6	7	13	▼2
Country Liberal (NT)	34,954	0.22	+0.00	1	0	1	Steady
Greens	1,859,974	11.72	−0.94	6	5	11	Steady
One Nation	899,296	5.67	+1.38	3	1	4	▲2
Legalise Cannabis	553,163	3.49	+0.16	0	0	0	Steady
Trumpet of Patriots	413,238	2.60	+2.38 (Note: As Australian Federation Party)	0	0	0	Steady
Family First	236,728	1.49	New	0	0	0	Steady
Animal Justice	198,611	1.25	−0.35	0	0	0	Steady
Lambie	166,085	1.05	+0.84	1	0	1	Steady
People First/Katter's Australian (QLD)	151,310	0.95	New	0	0	0	▼1
Australia's Voice	119,717	0.75	+0.75	0	1	1	Steady
David Pocock	114,915	0.72	+0.32	1	0	1	Steady
Christians	102,519	0.65	+0.43	0	0	0	Steady
Indigenous-Aboriginal	101,508	0.64	+0.16	0	0	0	Steady
Libertarian/HEART/People First (NSW)	92,892	0.59	New	0	0	0	Steady
Nationals (WA)/(SA)	63,738	0.40	+0.37	0	0	0	Steady
Libertarian	63,572	0.40	+0.40	0	0	0	Steady
Victorian Socialists	63,093	0.40	+0.26	0	0	0	Steady
Shooters, Fishers, Farmers	59,434	0.37	−0.61	0	0	0	Steady
Sustainable Australia	58,090	0.37	−0.15	0	0	0	Steady
FUSION	46,007	0.29	−0.05	0	0	0	Steady
People First/HEART (VIC)	44,080	0.28	New	0	0	0	Steady
Socialist Alliance	37,813	0.24	+0.05	0	0	0	Steady
Democrats	37,734	0.24	−0.20	0	0	0	Steady
People First	37,505	0.24	New	0	0	0	Steady
Citizens	35,432	0.22	+0.02	0	0	0	Steady
Unendorsed/Ungrouped/Independents	36,245	0.23	−0.67	0	1	1	▼1
Great Australian	15,249	0.10	−0.45	0	0	0	Steady
Great Australian/HEART (QLD)	5,927	0.04	New	0	0	0	Steady
HEART/Libertarian (ACT)	3,444	0.02	New	0	0	0	Steady
Tammy Tyrrell for Tasmania (TAS)	—N/a (Note: Did not run any candidates in this election.)			0	1	1	Steady
United Australia Party	—N/a			0	1	1	Steady
Total	15,871,189	–	–	40	36	76	–
Informal votes	567,305	3.45	+0.03				
Turnout	16,438,494	90.83	+0.36				
Registered voters	18,098,797	–	–				
Source: AEC, ABC

== Aftermath and reactions ==
=== Domestic reactions ===
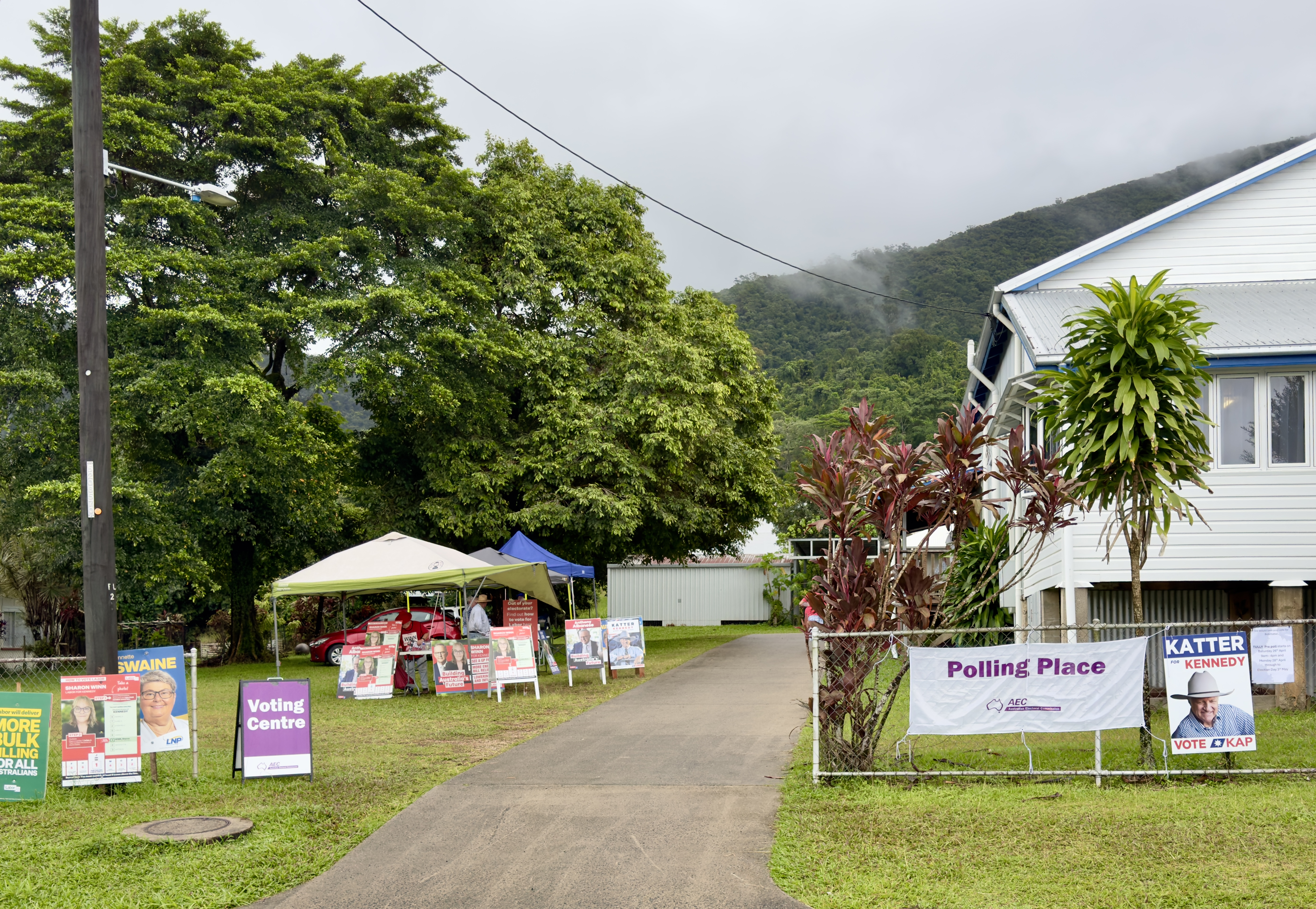
A polling place in the Queensland town of Tully, in the division of Kennedy

Prominent psephological commentator and ABC chief election analyst Antony Green reported a second term for Labor at 8:25 pm, within two and a half hours of east-coast polls closing. This was 51 minutes faster than his projection of Labor ousting the Coalition at the prior federal election at 9:16 pm, and just over an hour faster than his projection of the Coalition win at the federal election before that in 2019 at 9:31 pm. This was followed by major media organisations also projecting a Labor win, as well as Peter Dutton's own seat loss at 8:40 pm. Preliminary results indicated that Labor had gained seats in all six states. Labor had taken at least 13 seats off the Coalition, including four in South East Queensland, three in Sydney, and both seats in Northern Tasmania. Labor was also projected to have won two inner Brisbane seats held by the Greens. The final result remained in doubt for 16 seats, half of which were in Victoria.

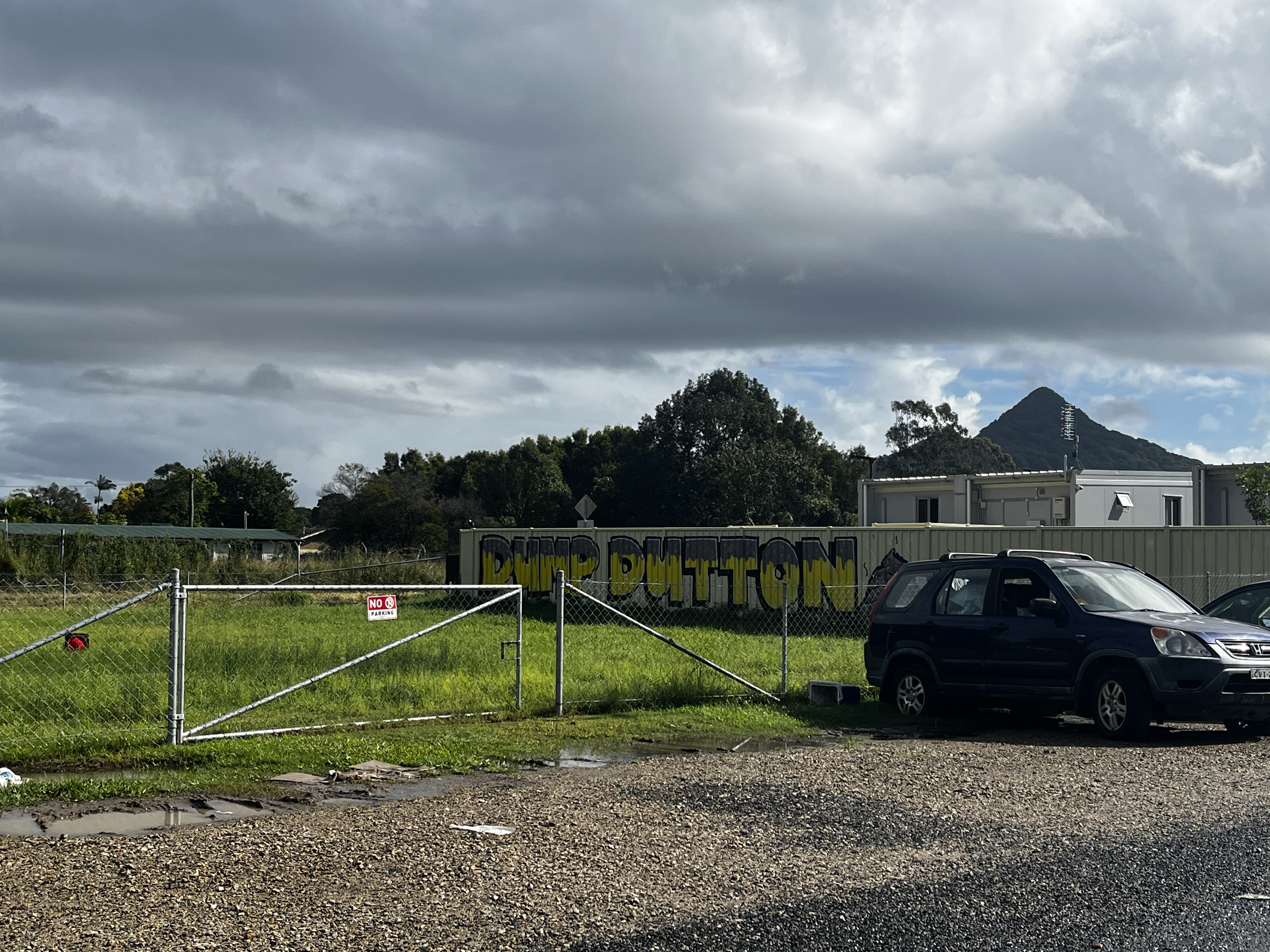
Graffiti against Dutton on a wall in Mullumbimby, in the NSW division of Richmond

Dutton conceded defeat shortly after 9:30 pm AEST on election night, announcing that he had called Anthony Albanese to congratulate him on Labor's re-election. In his concession speech, Dutton acknowledged the Coalition's poor performance and took full responsibility for the result. He also became the first sitting federal opposition leader to lose his own seat (won by Ali France of the Labor Party) in a federal election. Claiming victory on election night, Albanese addressed supporters with a message of unity and optimism, declaring it "a time of profound opportunity for our nation". He emphasised the importance of collective effort in shaping the country's future, stating, "We have everything we need to seize this moment and make it our own, but we must do it together." Dutton ran what was considered by numerous commentators to be a poor campaign, including by former Labor leader Bill Shorten who described it as the "worst campaign in living memory".

Albanese's win has been described as a landslide victory and historic comeback, having been returned with an increased majority, as well as exceeding most of the opinion polling showing either a smaller majority for the Labor government or a hung parliament. As a result, comparisons have been made to the Canadian federal election held earlier in the same week where the incumbent centre-left minority government, led by the Liberal Party, overturned a significant deficit in polling, made gains, and won another term. Commentators spoke of a negative "Trump effect" as Conservative opposition leader Pierre Poilievre also lost his seat. According to the BBC's Australia correspondent Katy Watson, United States president Donald Trump was "the gamechanger" and Albanese was able "to convince voters he was a safer pair of hands in an uncertain world". However, the fact that the Canadian Conservatives were able to gain seats, and achieve the highest popular vote of a centre-right party in Canada since 1988; unlike the Coalition losing even more seats, suggests other domestic factors, not just the "Trump effect" were responsible for the Coalition's loss. Antony Green of the ABC said: "Whether this was down to Labor's campaign being brilliant, the Coalition's a dud, or concern over instability created by the peculiarly chaotic governing style of President Trump, is hard to disaggregate. In my opinion it is a combination of all three."

The Liberal Party's campaign was heavily influenced by the conservative 'extreme separatist church', the Plymouth Brethren Christian Church — also known as the Exclusive Brethren — which provided significant funding to the Liberal Party's campaign (estimated to be more than one million dollars), and an 'army' of volunteers to marginal seats. Members of the Brethren made close to one million phone calls for the Liberal campaign. Members of the Brethren working as Liberal volunteers at polling stations were instructed to deny that they were members of the Brethren if asked by members of the public and were dressed to avoid detection — Brethren are normally forbidden to have uncovered legs, however male Brethren wore shorts and female Brethren wore short skirts while campaigning. Former Liberal senator Linda Reynolds publicly raised concerns about the influence of the church sect on party policy and asked 'Liberal elders' Nick Minchin and Pru Goward to investigate them in their review of the party. Liberal campaigners described the Brethren post-election as "very coercive and controlling of our candidates." Members of the Brethren were reported to parliament's Joint Standing Committee on Electoral Matters as being intimidating, going so far as to poke people, follow them home at night from the polling booth or shouting at a voter who took material from a non-Liberal-aligned candidate that the voter wanted to "ruin Australia". Deputy chairman of the committee Richard Colbeck said that "if it is coordinated, it should be declared" and provided a comparison to unions being a significant third-party campaigner. Members of the Brethren individually donated a cumulative $700,000 to the lobby group Advance.

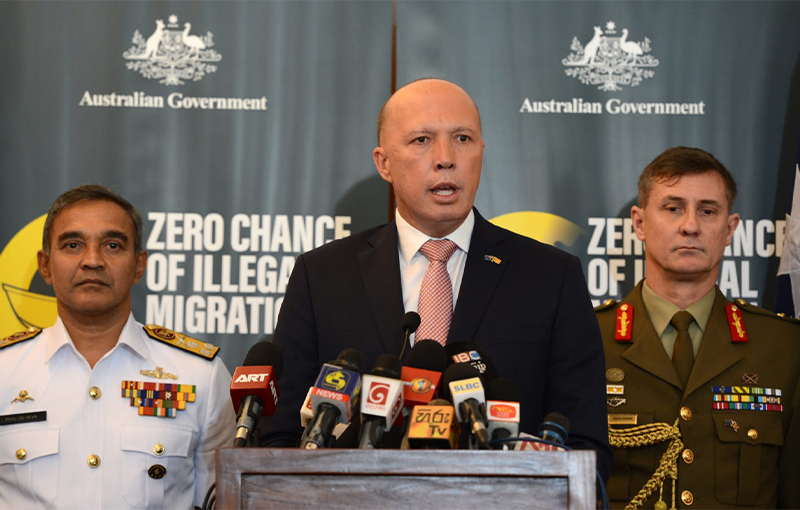
Dutton as Home Affairs minister in 2019, discussing Operation Sovereign Borders. Commentators have opined that Dutton's association with "tough" policies created a negative perception in the electorate.

Commentators have opined that Dutton's image as being a "hard man" became a drag on his campaign. Albanese sought to contrast with Dutton by stating that "kindness isn't weakness" in response Dutton's frequent criticisms of Albanese as a "weak leader".

The election marked the first time since 2007, and the third overall since Federation, that a federal leader of one of the major parties lost their seat in Parliament. (Note: At the 2007 federal election, prime minister John Howard was defeated in his seat of Bennelong. At the 1929 federal election, prime minister Stanley Bruce was defeated in his seat of Flinders.) Additionally, Albanese became the first prime minister to be re-elected after serving a full term since John Howard won his fourth and final term in 2004, and the first Labor leader to do so since Bob Hawke's re-election in 1990. It is the first time a Labor government has been re-elected with a majority since 1993, and the largest number of seats ever for Labor. This was the fourth consecutive election since 2013 that the Coalition lost primary vote support. The Liberals were reduced to their smallest presence in the House since their founding in 1944, and turned in the worst election result for the main non-Labor party since the United Australia Party (immediate forerunner of the Liberals) was reduced to 14 seats in 1943. The significant swing against the Liberal Party was called "diabolical" by former senior Liberal minister Simon Birmingham.

The Liberals suffered particularly large swings against them in metropolitan seats. Notably, the Liberals won no seats in Adelaide for the first time since 1946; the last Liberal representing the city, James Stevens in Sturt, was defeated by Labor challenger Claire Clutterham. The Liberals won just two of the more than 400 metropolitan election day booths across the seven Adelaide-based seats—Myrtle Bank in Sturt and Unley Park in the division of Adelaide. The Liberals were reduced to only three seats in Sydney, three in Melbourne, two in Brisbane, and one in Perth. This added to the severe losses they had suffered in metropolitan electorates in 2022, with a number of wealthy urban seats which had been the power base for the party and its predecessors for decades falling to teal independents or to Labor.

It is the norm for first-term Australian governments to lose seats and suffer a swing to the opposition when seeking a second term. However, Labor's 2025 victory was the first time that an incumbent Australian government served a full first term and won a second term with an increased majority and a swing towards it. The last time a first term government won re-election with a swing towards it was in 1943, incumbent John Curtin led Labor to a landslide victory but had just taken office mid-term after securing a change of government via crossbench support, not via the prior 1940 election. Labor won 62.7% of the 150 seats in the House of Representatives, making the 2025 election its second-best ever result in terms of percentage of the House controlled, beating its previous records in 1983 under Bob Hawke (60% of seats), 1929 (61.3% of seats under James Scullin) but still falling short of its all-time record of 66.2% of the seats in the 1943 election. Labor's 94 seats in the House of Representatives is the highest number of seats ever won by a single political party in an Australian election, equalling the number of seats won by the Coalition at the 1996 federal election. Labor retained all the seats it held prior to the election; a federal government had not achieved this since the 1966 federal election. In the Senate, Labor increased its share of seats to 28, while the Coalition fell to 27 seats, making Labor the largest bloc in the upper house for the first time since 1984.

On 14 May, it was reported that the Australian Electoral Commission found a missing container containing 1,866 ballots for the division of Barton at the home of an AEC worker. The votes had already been counted and the container still sealed, so the electoral result was not affected.

The ABC's election night coverage was the last to feature Antony Green as chief election analyst after over 30 years in the role. A video was shown on the broadcast with former prime ministers Paul Keating, John Howard, Kevin Rudd, Julia Gillard, Tony Abbott, Malcolm Turnbull, Scott Morrison, and prime minister Albanese all praising Green for his work for the ABC.

Research conducted in June 2025 by DemosAU found that 75% of Australians believed their vote had been counted fairly at the election compared to 13% who didn't, including 67% who trust the Australian Electoral Commission. 69% also believe that democracy in Australia is something to be proud of.

==== Political parties and groupings ====
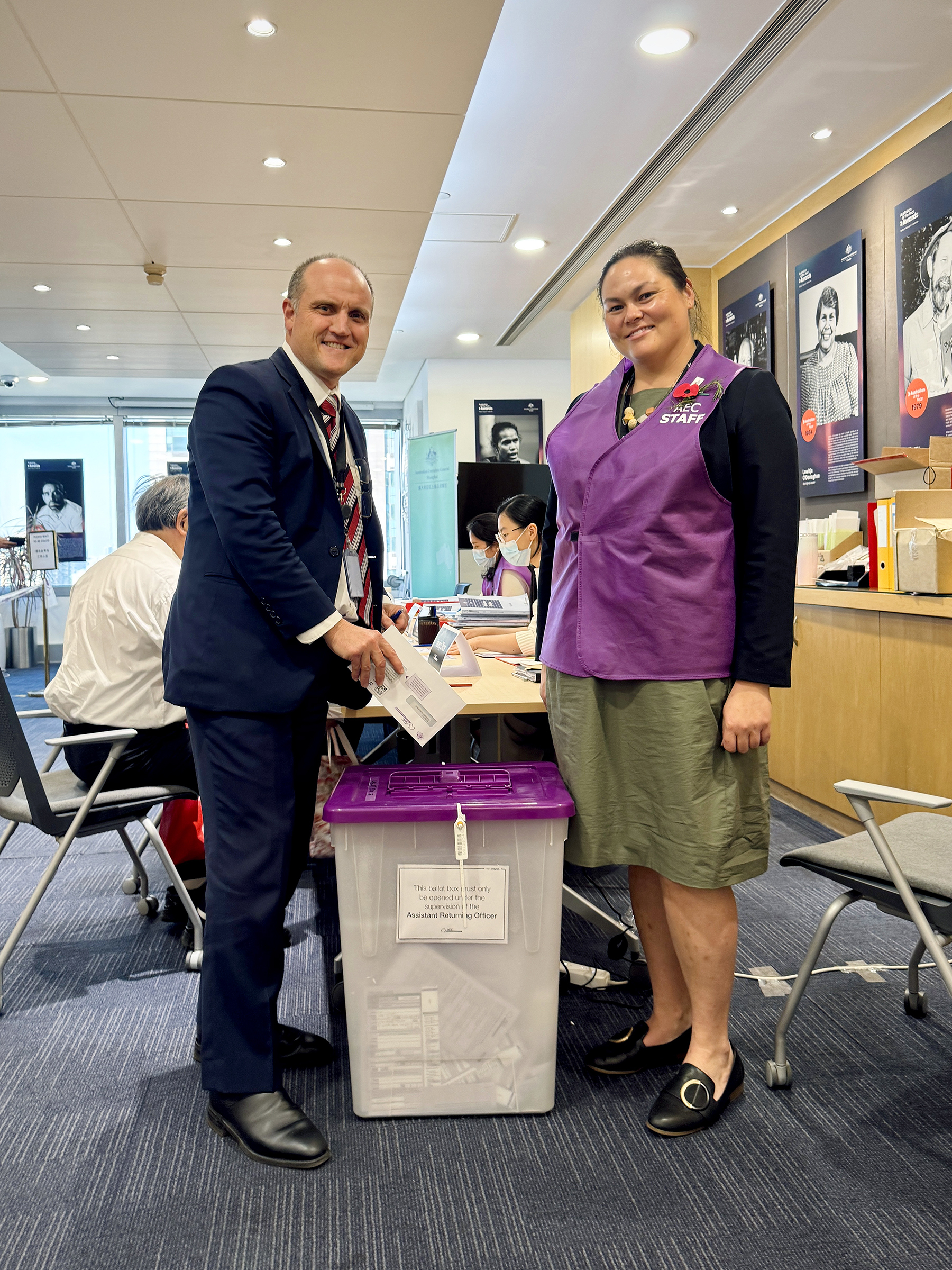
Australians voting in the federal election in Shanghai

Within the Liberal and National Parties, there were significant ramifications for the defeat, leading to tensions between the two parties. Deputy Liberal Leader Sussan Ley was elected as the Leader of the Liberal Party, replacing Peter Dutton, and defeating Shadow Treasurer Angus Taylor, with Ted O'Brien being elected as her deputy. Nationals leader David Littleproud fought off a challenge from frontbencher Matt Canavan to retain his position. Northern Territory Country Liberal Senator Jacinta Nampijinpa Price shifted from the Nationals to the Liberal party room aiming to become Taylor's deputy, leading to discontent among Liberal moderates.

The Coalition agreement between the Liberal and National parties was not immediately renewed following the election, ending the political partnership for the first time in 38 years. This temporarily made the Liberals the sole official opposition with a total of 28 seats, with the Nationals (15 seats) moving to the crossbench. This crossbench was the largest in post-war Australian political history. The Liberals intended to name a shadow ministry and the Nationals planned on naming party spokespersons. The decision to separate was based on policy differences and disagreements over expectations of shadow cabinet solidarity. Eight days after the split was announced, the two parties agreed to re-form the Coalition, citing agreement on several policy areas that the Nationals had initially described as "red lines". A shadow ministry was named on 28 May including both Liberals and Nationals. Neither former Nationals leaders Barnaby Joyce nor Michael McCormack, who were both previously shadow ministers prior to the election and publicly opposed to the Coalition split, were included. The Coalition reformation was predicated on policy agreements on nuclear power, a regional future fund, divestiture powers and regional telecommunications infrastructure.

The increase in Labor's parliamentary representation led to a factional realignment in its party room, with Labor Left becoming the majority. This, combined with the departure of former Victorian factional powerbroker Bill Shorten, affected ministerial appointments with shifting dynamics between the various Labor Right factions, particularly in Victoria. Labor Right faction-aligned ministers Ed Husic and Attorney-General Mark Dreyfus were not re-elected to the ministry, being replaced by Victorian MPs aligned to Deputy Prime Minister Richard Marles. This led to significant tension within Labor, with both ministers being perceived as having performed well in the previous term. Former Labor Prime Minister Paul Keating also spoke out publicly against the influence of the factional powerbrokers.

In the Senate, Labor increased its share of seats to 28, while the Coalition fell to 27 seats, making Labor the largest bloc in the upper house for the first time since 1984.

Despite registering only a minor decrease in their national primary vote, the Australian Greens suffered substantial losses in the House of Representatives due to swings in the seats they had won at the 2022 election. The party lost three of its four seats, including the seat of Melbourne, which it had held since 2010, where Greens leader Adam Bandt was defeated by Labor's Sarah Witty. The Greens' only remaining seat in the lower house was Ryan in Queensland, held by Elizabeth Watson-Brown. Analysts attributed the Greens' losses to a combination of factors, including a perceived shift away from core environmental issues, leading to voter alienation in key electorates. Losses by the Greens were primarily attributed to the collapse of the Coalition, which came in third in three seats held by the Greens prior to the election. The result meant that instead of Greens-Coalition races where most Labor votes transferred to the Greens, the result was Greens-Labor races where votes for the Coalition transferred to Labor. Following Bandt's defeat in Melbourne, Queensland senator Larissa Waters was elected as the Greens' new leader, with New South Wales senator Mehreen Faruqi defeating Western Australian senator Dorinda Cox for the deputy leadership. Cox defected from the Greens to the Labor Party on 2 June, increasing Labor's voting bloc to 29 and decreasing the Greens seat count to 10.

Clive Palmer spent approximately $60 million in the 2025 federal election on a national advertising campaign for Trumpet of Patriots, including over $6 million on YouTube and Meta platforms, and sending over 17 million text messages; the party failed to secure any seats in Parliament, garnering about 1.85% of the national vote. Following this defeat, Palmer announced his retirement from politics, citing his age and a desire to focus on philanthropic efforts, however stated in August 2025 he was considering returning to politics.

Pauline Hanson's One Nation achieved its equal best result for seat total (equalling the 2016 election), increasing its Senate representation from two to four seats with the election of Warwick Stacey in New South Wales and Tyron Whitten in Western Australia. Stacey resigned from parliament after two sitting weeks, One Nation selected former adviser to Hanson Sean Bell to replace him.

Most of the teal independents retained their seats except for Kylea Tink, whose seat was abolished after a redistribution, and Zoe Daniel, who lost her Melbourne seat of Goldstein to the previous MP Tim Wilson. In the northern Sydney division of Bradfield, independent Nicolette Boele won a close contest against Liberal candidate Gisele Kapterian. The count in Bradfield was the last to be completed of all seats, taking until early June. On 15 July, Kapterian launched a legal challenge regarding the result in Bradfield, which was to be held in the Court of Disputed Returns. On 25 September 145 days after the election, Kapterian conceded defeat and withdrew her request for legal proceedings.

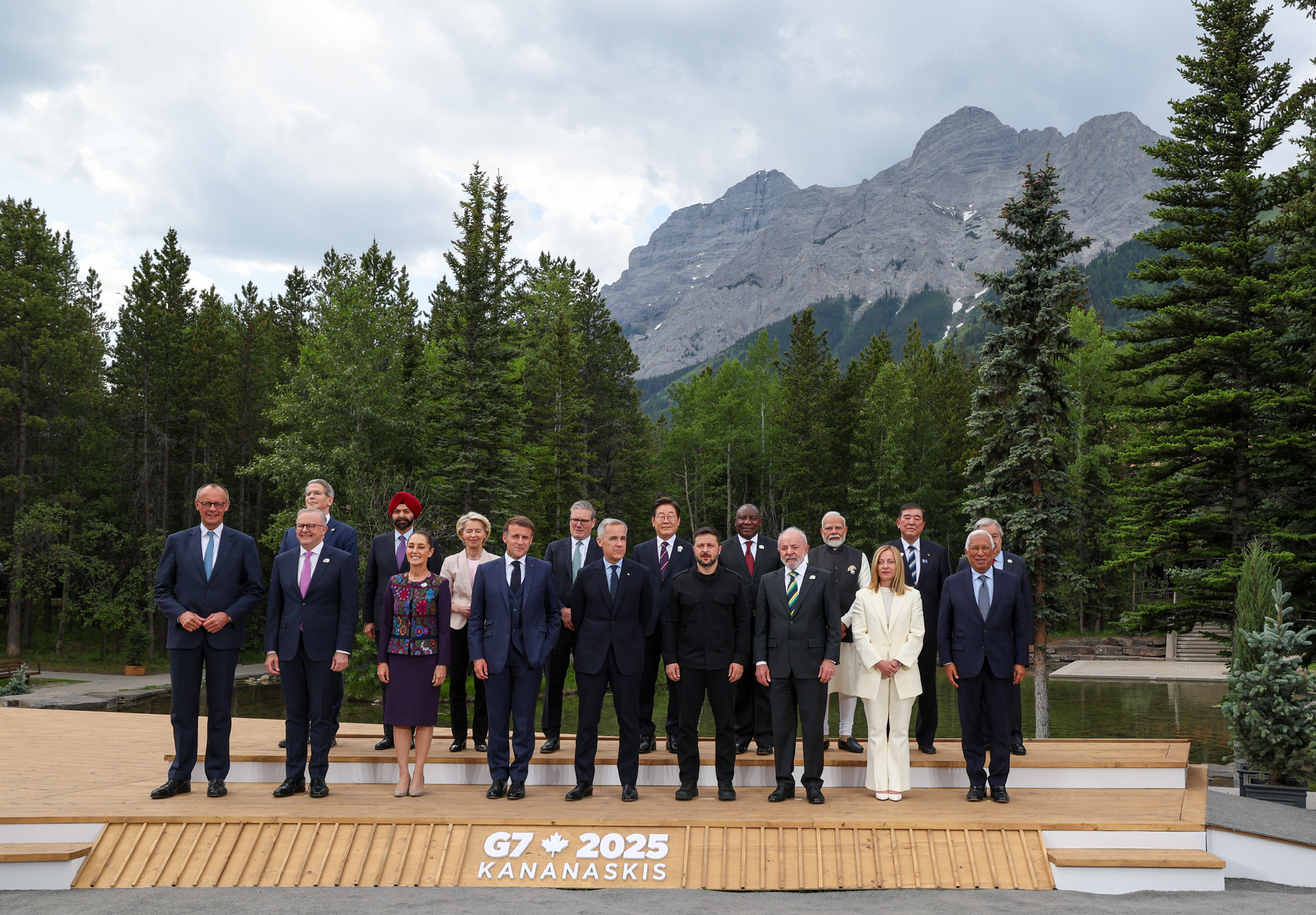
On 17 June 2025, one month after the election, Albanese (second from front left) attended the G7 summit in Kananaskis, Canada.

==== Election reviews ====
===== Liberal =====
The Liberal Party initially did not release their election review, however their review was obtained and tabled by Albanese during question time in parliament. The review was conducted by Pru Goward and Nick Minchin. The report warns of an "absence of reflection" following the party's loss. The report says that there were an "extraordinary combination of internal errors" by the parliamentary and organisational wings of the party. Submissions to the report criticised the party's "capacity to thoughtlessly offend groups". Dutton criticised the report's findings for providing a "distorted" view of his leadership and said that the report did not emphasise enough the impact of incorrect opinion polling during the election campaign.

===== Labor =====
The Labor Party's election review was released in January 2026; it warns against complacency and says that the changing political landscape means there are effectively 150 by-elections with local circumstances playing a key role and that well-resourced challenges could pose a threat to Labor MPs. The review said that to win again, the party should focus on "maintaining caucus unity and stability, delivering tangible improvement to people's lives and maintaining consistent and effective engagement with local communities". The review highlighted that Labor performed well with culturally diverse and university-educated people, people who were working from home also played a role in Labor's success and electorates with high mortgage ownership. Research conducted after the election showed that increasing bulk-billing and reducing the price of medicines on the PBS were the most popular policies of the Labor Party, this was followed by tax cuts, and party leadership.

=== Australian Election Study ===
The Australian Election Study has taken place after every election since 1987 and conducts research on many factors surrounding the election. Out of the ten policies polled — health, education, climate change, environment, cost of living, housing affordability, economic management, taxation, immigration, and national security — Labor led on nine issues with the only issue they did not lead on being national security. Albanese had a score of 5.1 to 3.2 for Dutton.

=== International reactions ===
- Canada: Prime Minister Mark Carney congratulated Albanese on social media, and stated: "In an increasingly divided world, Canada and Australia are close partners and the most reliable of friends."
- China: The Ministry of Foreign Affairs congratulated Albanese and stated that China "stands ready to work with the new Australian government led by Prime Minister Albanese" to advance "a more mature, stable, and productive comprehensive strategic partnership".
- Estonia: Prime Minister Kristen Michal congratulated Albanese on his re-election and emphasised the two countries' long-distance relationship.
- Fiji: Prime Minister Sitiveni Rabuka congratulated Albanese on his re-election, and said he is looking forward to continuing their partnership, grounded in mutual respect, development cooperation, and regional stability.
- France: President Emmanuel Macron congratulated Albanese on his re-election, and said: "In the face of global challenges, Australia and France have so much to achieve together—especially in the Indo-Pacific. Let us continue to write, with ambition and friendship, the new chapter of our partnership."
- Germany: Chancellor Olaf Scholz congratulated Albanese and his party on the election victory.
- India: Prime Minister Narendra Modi congratulated Albanese on his victory and re-election. He said that "this emphatic mandate indicates the enduring faith of the Australian people in your leadership. I look forward to working together to further deepen the India-Australia Comprehensive Strategic Partnership and advance our shared vision for peace, stability and prosperity in the Indo-Pacific."
- Indonesia: President Prabowo Subianto congratulated Albanese on his re-election as Prime Minister in social media, said that he is looking forward to continuing and strengthening Indonesia's partnership with Australia and work together to address shared challenges and pursue mutual goals in the region and beyond. He later congratulated Albanese again in a direct phone call and welcomed Albanese's intention to visit Indonesia after the election.
- Ireland: Taoiseach Micheál Martin congratulated Albanese on his election victory and emphasised strong relations and addressing challenges between Ireland and Australia.
- Japan: Prime Minister Shigeru Ishiba congratulated Albanese on the result of the Australian federal election, saying, "I look forward to continuing to collaborate with you to further develop our relationship, as 'Special Strategic Partners', and to realise a 'Free and Open Indo-Pacific'."
- Latvia: President Edgars Rinkēvičs congratulated Albanese on the electoral victory, saying that he is "looking forward to continuing to develop relations between Latvia and Australia, strengthening global and regional security as well as close cooperation in the international organisations." Prime Minister Evika Siliņa congratulated Albanese on his convincing victory in federal election and emphasised common factors that bond the two nations.
- Malaysia: Prime Minister Anwar Ibrahim gave his heartiest congratulations to Albanese on social media, saying that the election results being called swiftly speaks volumes. He then said that Albanese's attention on Southeast Asia did not go unnoticed and hoped to continue engaging together to working together to uphold stability, enhance resilience, and shape a future of shared prosperity.
- Netherlands: Prime Minister Dick Schoof congratulated Albanese on his victory in the election and emphasised close relations between the two countries despite the long distance.
- New Zealand: Prime Minister Christopher Luxon congratulated Albanese on social media, saying "New Zealand has no better friend and no greater ally than Australia" and looked forward to working together.
- Norway: Prime Minister Jonas Gahr Støre congratulated Albanese on his re-election as Prime Minister of Australia. He said that Norway looks forward to continuing the cooperation with Australia, particularly in important areas such as defence and security.
- Papua New Guinea: Prime Minister James Marape congratulated Albanese on his election win and confirmed that Albanese would attend the country's independence anniversary celebrations.
- Philippines: President Bongbong Marcos congratulated Albanese on his victory saying, "The ties between our two countries have grown stronger with each passing year. Anchored not just in shared values, but in genuine friendship. Perhaps this is a sign that it's time for another visit, whether it's over a flat white down under or a rich cup of chocolate here in Old Manila."
- Singapore: Prime Minister Lawrence Wong wrote a letter to congratulate Albanese for his victory, stating that both countries are like-minded partners with a common interest in upholding an open, inclusive and rules-based global order. Albanese replied with his own congratulatory message to Wong for winning the 2025 Singaporean general election, which was held concurrently on the same day.
- Spain: Prime Minister Pedro Sánchez congratulated Albanese and the Labor Party on social media stating that Australia and Spain would continue working together for social justice and the defense of common values.
- Taiwan: President Lai Ching-te congratulated Albanese on his election win while also praising Taiwan's positive relationship with Australia.
- Tibet: Sikyong Penpa Tsering congratulated Albanese and applauded his compassion for Tibetan refugees.
- Ukraine: President Volodymyr Zelenskyy congratulated Albanese on his electoral victory and wished him continued success in serving the people of Australia and delivering meaningful achievements.
- United Kingdom: Prime Minister Keir Starmer congratulated Albanese on social media, saying that "long distance friendships can be the strongest" and looked forward to "continue to work together" on shared ambitions.
- United States: Secretary of State Marco Rubio congratulated Albanese on his electoral victory, saying that he is looking forward to "deepening its relationship with Australia to advance our common interests and promote freedom and stability in the Indo-Pacific and globally." President Donald Trump later congratulated Albanese and told journalists after disembarking Marine One that he is fond of Albanese, and said that he has a good relationship with Albanese and that he knew nothing about the opposition. In this press conference regarding the call, Albanese stated, "We'll continue to engage."

==== Organisations ====
- European Union: President of the European Commission Ursula von der Leyen congratulated Albanese and his party on their victory in the Australian federal election.

==== Individuals ====
- Dalai Lama: The 14th Dalai Lama wrote to Albanese to congratulate him on his re-election as Prime Minister following his party's victory and expressed his "deep gratitude to the Australian government and its people for their interest in and support for the Tibetan people's freedom and dignity".

== See also ==
- 2025 Canadian federal election – Held within the same week and saw a similar increase in support for the incumbent government in opposition to Trump and also led to the Opposition Leader losing their seat.
- 2025 Singaporean general election – Held on the same day.
