= 48th Parliament of Australia =

2025–present Australian legislative term

48th Parliament of the Commonwealth of Australia
- 47th ← → 49th
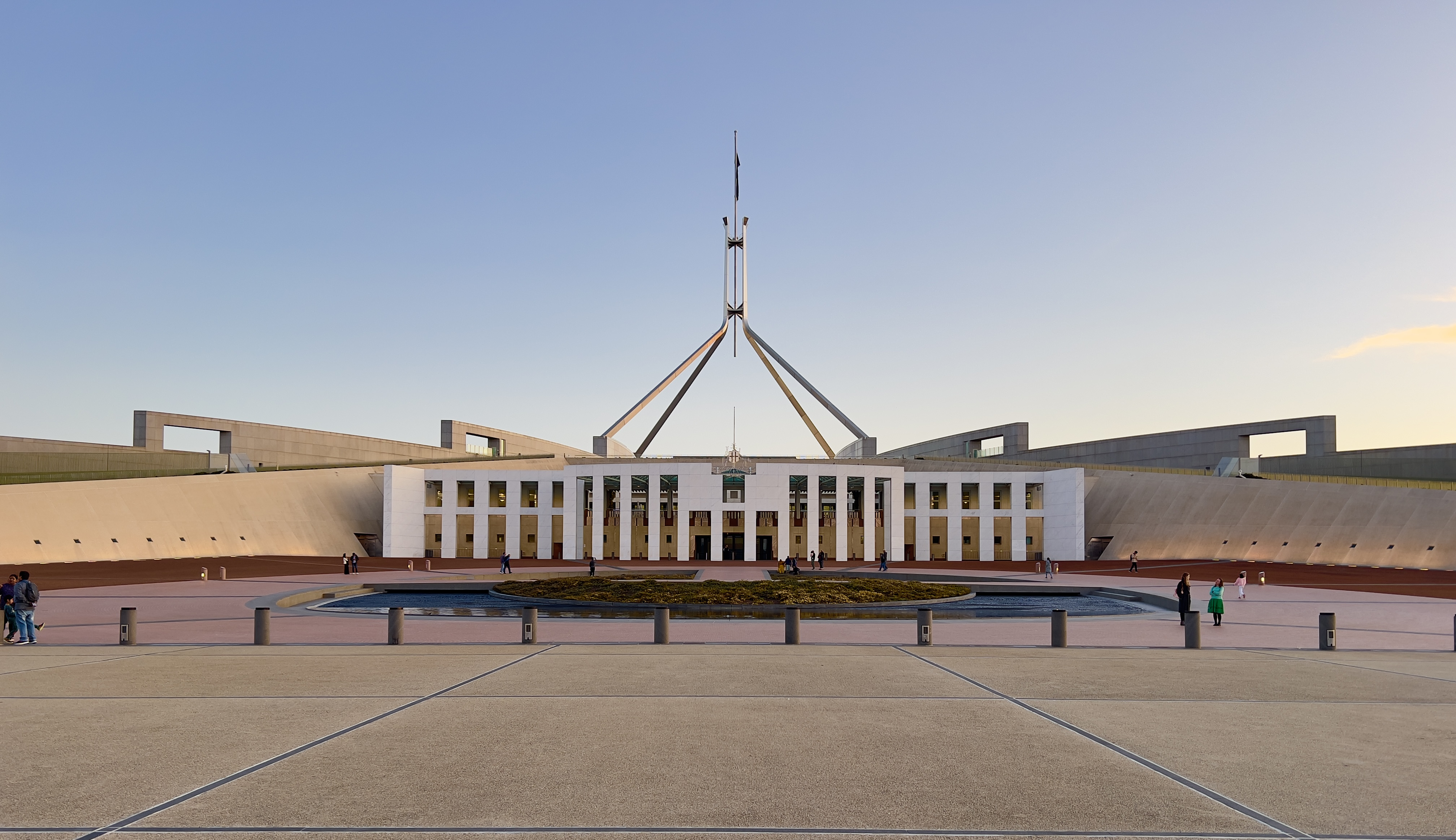
- Parliament House (2023) Parliament House (2023)

22 July 2025 –
- Members: 76 senators 150 representatives
- Senate President: Sue Lines, Labor (from 26 July 2022)
- House Speaker: Milton Dick, Labor (from 26 July 2022)

Sessions
- 1st: 22 July 2025 –

The 48th Parliament of Australia is the current meeting of the legislative branch of the Commonwealth of Australia, composed of the Australian Senate and the Australian House of Representatives. The 48th parliament was opened on 22 July 2025, following the federal election which was held on 3 May 2025. The Labor government, led by Anthony Albanese, Australia's 31st prime minister, was reelected with an increased 18-seat majority, holding 94 out of the 150 seats in the lower house.

== Events of the 48th Parliament ==
=== Prior to sitting ===
The 2025 Australian federal election, held on 3 May, resulted in a historic landslide victory for the Australian Labor Party (ALP) under Prime Minister Anthony Albanese. Labor secured 94 seats in the House of Representatives, growing their parliamentary majority and achieving the largest number of seats won by the party at the federal level in its history. The result exceeded almost all published opinion polling, which had predicted either a smaller majority for the Labor government or a hung parliament. It was the fourth time in history that a party or coalition secured 90 or more seats in a federal election — the last instance being in 2013. It also marked the first time a single party, and specifically the Labor Party, achieved this feat and this was also the equal largest number of seats won by a party or coalition in Australian electoral history exceeding the 1975 election result and equalling the 1996 result.

The Coalition suffered significant losses, including the seat of Dickson, held by then-Opposition Leader Peter Dutton, who was unseated by Labor's Ali France.

A particularly notable outcome was the dramatic decline of the Australian Greens in the lower house. The party lost three of its four seats, including the long-held seat of Melbourne, where Greens leader Adam Bandt was defeated by Labor's Sarah Witty, ending his 15-year tenure in Parliament. The Greens' only remaining seat in the House of Representatives was Ryan in Queensland, held by Elizabeth Watson-Brown. Some prominent commentary attributed the Greens' losses to their policy positions, particularly regarding the Israel-Gaza conflict, and a perceived shift away from core environmental issues, leading to voter alienation in key electorates. Other commentary instead explained the dramatic fall in seat count as primarily due to the way small shifts in vote counts can lead to large shifts in margins and seat counts under Australia's preferential voting system, also a factor in the Greens' sudden jump from 1 to 4 seats in 2022.

Another significant development in the 2025 election was the re-emergence of Clive Palmer with a new political party, the Trumpet of Patriots. After the High Court blocked the re-registration of his previous party, the United Australia Party, Palmer joined the Trumpet of Patriots in February 2025, which was modelled after Trumpism. The party's campaign featured slogans like "Make Australia Great Again" and policies opposing immigration and gender diversity initiatives. Despite spending approximately $60 million on a nationwide advertising blitz, including over $6 million on YouTube and Meta platforms, and sending over 17 million unsolicited text messages, the party failed to secure any seats in Parliament, garnering only 1.85% of the national vote. Following this defeat, Palmer announced his retirement from politics.

Nationals senator Matt Canavan challenged incumbent leader David Littleproud in a leadership spill. Littleproud was re-elected as party leader on 12 May.

On 13 May 2025, the Liberals elected their new leader in a leadership election. Following the federal election but prior to the leadership election, Senator Jacinta Nampijinpa Price defected from the Nationals party room to the Liberal party room to stand in the election for the position of Deputy Leader. Sussan Ley was subsequently elected leader, narrowly defeating Angus Taylor, with Ted O'Brien being elected as her deputy. Ley is the first woman elected to lead the Liberals, the Coalition, or serve as the Leader of the Opposition at the federal level in Australia. At 63, Ley is also the oldest first-time Leader of the Opposition since Arthur Calwell in 1960.

The Greens held a leadership election on 15 May 2025 and elected Queensland senator Larissa Waters as their leader.

On 20 May 2025, Littleproud announced the breakup of the Coalition, citing irreconcilable policy disagreements around nuclear energy amongst other topics.

On 28 May 2025, Sussan Ley and David Littleproud announced that a new deal had been reached to reunify the Liberal–National Coalition after the Liberal Party agreed on an 'in principle' basis to support the four policy demands from the Nationals Party – removing the moratorium on nuclear energy, supermarket divestiture powers, regional phone coverage, and a regional future fund. The Coalition's shadow cabinet, consisting of 14 Liberals and 6 Nationals, was announced later that afternoon.

On 2 June 2025, Western Australian senator Dorinda Cox announced that she had defected from the Greens to the ALP. This brought Labor up to 29 senators, allowing them to pass legislation with either the Coalition or the Greens. Alternatively, Labor can pass legislation through the Senate with the support of all ten of the other crossbench senators; the four One Nation senators, Ralph Babet, Jacqui Lambie, Fatima Payman, David Pocock, and Lidia Thorpe, but this is considered unlikely due to their highly divergent political views.

=== Sitting ===
The parliament was opened by Governor General Sam Mostyn on 22 July 2025.

- 23 July 2025: Greens Senator Mehreen Faruqi is sanctioned by the Senate for holding up a sign during Mostyn's address; reading "Gaza is starving/Words won't feed them/Sanction Israel".
- 24 July 2025: Senators for Pauline Hanson's One Nation turn their backs during the Senate Welcome to Country, prompting criticism from the government and the Greens.
- 29 July 2025: Education minister Jason Clare announces legislation to increase standards at childcare centres in the wake of sexual abuse scandals.
- 31 July 2025: Government legislation to cut HECS/HELP debts by 20% passes the Senate.
- 28 August 2025: Government legislation to enshrine penalty rates in law passes the Senate.
- 10 September 2025: Sussan Ley removes Jacinta Nampijinpa Price from her shadow ministry over comments by Price that suggested that the government was specifically bringing in Indian migrants as they were more likely to vote Labor.
- 3 October 2025: Andrew Hastie quits the Ley shadow ministry over disagreements about immigration policy.
- 27 November 2025: Barnaby Joyce quits the Nationals and moves to the crossbench to sit as an independent. This reduces the Coalition down from 43 seats in the House to 42 seats.
- 8 December 2025: Joyce joins One Nation, becoming the party's first member of the House of Representatives in the 48th parliament.
- 22 January 2026: David Littleproud announces that all National Party members have left the shadow cabinet, and that the Nationals are no longer party to the Coalition agreement.
- 8 February 2026: The Liberals and the Nationals reunify, agreeing that shadow cabinet decisions could no longer be overturned by neither individual party, but instead only be overturned by a joint Coalition Party room
- 13 February 2026: Angus Taylor successfully spills Sussan Ley for the leadership of the Liberal Party, becoming Leader of the Opposition.
- 17 February 2026: Taylor announces his shadow ministry.
- 10 March 2026: David Littleproud announces resignation as the leader of the National Party, but will remain as the National MP for the Division of Maranoa.
- 11 March 2026: Matt Canavan becomes leader of the National Party
- 16 March 2026: Canavan announces a reshuffle of National Party portfolios in the shadow ministry.
- 9 May 2026: David Farley wins the 2026 Farrer by-election as the One Nation candidate, giving them two MPs.
- 12 May 2026: Treasurer Jim Chalmers delivers the 2026–27 Federal Budget
- 14 May 2026: Senator Tammy Tyrrell announces that she has joined the Labor Party, giving Labor thirty seats in the Senate.
- 25 June 2026: Zali Steggall and Allegra Spender announce the formation of the Community Strong Australia Party, with registration expected to be finalised by October.
- 28 September 2026: Senator Larissa Waters steps down as leader of the Australian Greens, citing health issues related to chronic kidney disease. She remains a Senator.
- 30 September 2026: Senator David Shoebridge is elected leader of the Australian Greens, defeating Mehreen Faruqi and Sarah Hanson-Young in a contested leadership election.

== Major legislation ==
=== Assented ===
- 2 August 2025: Universities Accord (Cutting Student Debt by 20 Per Cent) Act 2025, Act No. 30
- 2 August 2025: Early Childhood Education and Care (Strengthening Regulation) Act 2025, Act No. 31
- 28 August 2025: Universities Accord (National Higher Education Code to Prevent and Respond to Gender-based Violence) Act 2025, Act No. 35
- 10 November 2025: Australian Centre for Disease Control Bill 2025, Act No. 61
- 4 December 2025: Communications Legislation Amendment (Australian Content Requirement for Subscription Video On Demand (Streaming) Services) Bill 2025, Act No. 71
- 20 January 2026: Combatting Antisemitism, Hate and Extremism (Criminal and Migration Laws) Bill 2026
- 20 January 2026: Combatting Antisemitism, Hate and Extremism (Firearms and Customs Laws) Bill 2026
- 13 March 2026: Royal Commissions Legislation Amendment (Protections for Providing Information) Bill 2026, Act No. 7
- 13 March 2026: Treasury Laws Amendment (Building a Stronger and Fairer Super System) Bill 2026, Act No. 8
- 13 March 2026: Superannuation (Building a Stronger and Fairer Super System) Imposition Bill 2026, Act No. 9
- 8 April 2026: National Disability Insurance Scheme Amendment (Integrity and Safeguarding) Bill 2026, Act No. 41

=== Bills before Parliament ===
- Treasury Laws Amendment (Tax Reform No. 1) Bill 2026
- Income Tax Rates Amendment (Tax Reform No. 1) Bill 2026

== Party summary ==
=== House of Representatives ===
House of Representatives composition as of 9 May 2026

Overview of House membership by party
	Party (shading shows majority)				Total	Vacant
	Labor	Liberal	National	Crossbench	Total	Vacant
End of previous Parliament	77	39	14	19 (Note: Included 13 Independents, 4 Greens, 1 Centre Alliance, and 1 KAP.)	149	2
Begin (8 December 2025)	94	28 (Note: Including 10 Liberal National Party of Queensland (LNP) MPs who sit in the Liberals party room)	14 (Note: Including 6 Liberal National Party of Queensland (LNP) MPs who sit in the Nationals party room)	14 (Note: The Crossbench includes 1 Greens, 1 Katter's Australian, 1 Centre Alliance, 1 One Nation, and 10 Independents: Nicolette Boele, Kate Chaney, Andrew Gee, Helen Haines, Dai Le, Monique Ryan, Sophie Scamps, Allegra Spender, Zali Steggall and Andrew Wilkie.)	150	0
13 February 2026	94	27	14	14	149	1
9 May 2026	94	27	14	15 (Note: Following the 2026 Farrer by-election)	150	0
Current voting share	62.7%	27.3%		10%	100%	0%

=== Senate ===
Senate composition as of 14 May 2026

Overview of Senate membership changes
Date	Party (shading shows majority)				Total	Vacant
Date	Labor	Liberal	National	Crossbench	Total	Vacant
End of previous Parliament	25	25	5	21 (Note: Included 11 Greens, 4 Independents, 1 JLN, 2 One Nation, 1 UAP, 1 People First, and 1 Australia's Voice.)	76	0
Begin (22 July 2025)	29	23	4	20 (Note: Included 10 Greens, 4 One Nation, 3 Independents, 1 JLN, 1 UAP, and 1 Australia's Voice.)	76	0
19 August 2025	29	23	4	19	75	1
18 September 2025	29	23	4	20	76	0
14 May 2026 (Note: Tammy Tyrrell joins the Labor Party)	30	23	4	19	76	0
Current voting share	39.5%	35.5%		25%	100%	0%

== Demographics ==
Women reached 50% representation across both chambers. Indigenous representation also increased, with Aboriginal and Torres Strait Islander people accounting for 4.0% of federal parliamentarians. According to a 2023 Parliamentary Library analysis, 3.5% of members identified as LGBTIQ+.

== Membership ==
=== Senate ===
40 of the 76 seats in the upper house were contested in the election in May 2025. The class of senators elected in 2025 are denoted with an asterisk (*).

==== Australian Capital Territory ====
▌ Katy Gallagher (ALP)*
▌ David Pocock (IND)*

==== New South Wales ====
▌ Tim Ayres (ALP)*
▌ Andrew Bragg (LP)*
▌ Ross Cadell (NAT)
▌ Jessica Collins (LP)*
▌ Mehreen Faruqi (AG)*
▌ Maria Kovacic (LP)
▌ Jenny McAllister (ALP)
▌ Deborah O'Neill (ALP)
▌ Dave Sharma (LP)
▌ Tony Sheldon (ALP)*
▌ David Shoebridge (AG)
▌ Sean Bell (PHON)*

==== Northern Territory ====
▌ Malarndirri McCarthy (ALP)*
▌ Jacinta Price (CLP)*

==== Queensland ====
▌ Penny Allman-Payne (AG)
▌ Matt Canavan (LNP)
▌ Anthony Chisholm (ALP)
▌ Nita Green (ALP)*
▌ Pauline Hanson (PHON)
▌ Susan McDonald (LNP)*
▌ James McGrath (LNP)
▌ Corinne Mulholland (ALP)*
▌ Malcolm Roberts (PHON)*
▌ Paul Scarr (LNP)
▌ Larissa Waters (GRN)*
▌ Murray Watt (ALP)

==== South Australia ====
▌ Alex Antic (LP)*
▌ Leah Blyth (LP)
▌ Don Farrell (ALP)
▌ Karen Grogan (ALP)*
▌ Sarah Hanson-Young (AG)*
▌ Kerrynne Liddle (LP)
▌ Andrew McLachlan (LP)
▌ Barbara Pocock (AG)
▌ Anne Ruston (LP)*
▌ Marielle Smith (ALP)*
▌ Charlotte Walker (ALP)*
▌ Penny Wong (ALP)

==== Tasmania ====
▌ Vanessa Bleyer (AG)
▌ Carol Brown (ALP)*
▌ Claire Chandler (LP)*
▌ Richard Colbeck (LP)*
▌ Josh Dolega (ALP)
▌ Richard Dowling (ALP)*
▌ Jonathon Duniam (LP)
▌ Chris Gatenby (LP)
▌ Jacqui Lambie (JLN)*
▌ Nick McKim (AG)*
▌ Helen Polley (ALP)
▌ Tammy Tyrrell (ALP)

==== Victoria ====
▌ Michelle Ananda-Rajah (ALP)*
▌ Ralph Babet (UAP)
▌ Raff Ciccone (ALP)*
▌ Lisa Darmanin (ALP)
▌ Sarah Henderson (LP)
▌ Steph Hodgins-May (AG)*
▌ Jane Hume (LP)*
▌ Bridget McKenzie (NAT)
▌ James Paterson (LP)*
▌ Jana Stewart (ALP)
▌ Lidia Thorpe (IND)
▌ Jess Walsh (ALP)*

==== Western Australia ====
▌ Slade Brockman (LP)*
▌ Michaelia Cash (LP)
▌ Dorinda Cox (ALP)
▌ Varun Ghosh (ALP)*
▌ Sue Lines (ALP)
▌ Matt O'Sullivan (LP)*
▌ Fatima Payman (AV)
▌ Dean Smith (LP)
▌ Jordon Steele-John (GRN)*
▌ Glenn Sterle (ALP)
▌ Ellie Whiteaker (ALP)*
▌ Tyron Whitten (PHON)*

=== House of Representatives ===
All 150 seats in the lower house were contested in the election in May 2025.

==== Australian Capital Territory ====
▌ Andrew Leigh (ALP—Fenner)
▌ Alicia Payne (ALP—Canberra)
▌ David Smith (ALP—Bean)

==== New South Wales ====
▌ Anthony Albanese (ALP—Grayndler)
▌ Ash Ambihaipahar (ALP—Barton)
▌ Carol Berry (ALP—Whitlam)
▌ Nicolette Boele (IND—Bradfield)
▌ Chris Bowen (ALP—McMahon)
▌ Tony Burke (ALP—Watson)
▌ Alison Byrnes (ALP—Cunningham)
▌ Jamie Chaffey (NAT—Parkes)
▌ Andrew Charlton (ALP—Parramatta)
▌ Jason Clare (ALP—Blaxland)
▌ Sharon Claydon (ALP—Newcastle)
▌ Pat Conaghan (NAT—Cowper)
▌ Pat Conroy (ALP—Shortland)
▌ Justine Elliot (ALP—Richmond)
▌ David Farley (ON—Farrer)
▌ Mike Freelander (ALP—Macarthur)
▌ Andrew Gee (IND—Calare)
▌ Alex Hawke (LP—Mitchell)
▌ Kevin Hogan (NAT—Page)
▌ Ed Husic (ALP—Chifley)
▌ Barnaby Joyce (PHON—New England)
▌ Simon Kennedy (LP—Cook)
▌ Jerome Laxale (ALP—Bennelong)
▌ Dai Le (IND—Fowler)
▌ Julian Leeser (LP—Berowra)
▌ Kristy McBain (ALP—Eden-Monaro)
▌ Emma McBride (ALP—Dobell)
▌ Michael McCormack (NAT—Riverina)
▌ Melissa McIntosh (LP—Lindsay)
▌ David Moncrieff (ALP—Hughes)
▌ Alison Penfold (NAT—Lyne)
▌ Fiona Phillips (ALP—Gilmore)
▌ Tanya Plibersek (ALP—Sydney)
▌ Gordon Reid (ALP—Robertson)
▌ Dan Repacholi (ALP—Hunter)
▌ Michelle Rowland (ALP—Greenway)
▌ Sophie Scamps (IND—Mackellar)
▌ Sally Sitou (ALP—Reid)
▌ Zhi Soon (ALP—Banks)
▌ Allegra Spender (CSA—Wentworth)
▌ Anne Stanley (ALP—Werriwa)
▌ Zali Steggall (CSA—Warringah)
▌ Meryl Swanson (ALP—Paterson)
▌ Angus Taylor (LP—Hume)
▌ Susan Templeman (ALP—Macquarie)
▌ Matt Thistlethwaite (ALP—Kingsford Smith)

==== Northern Territory ====
▌ Luke Gosling (ALP—Solomon)
▌ Marion Scrymgour (ALP—Lingiari)

==== Queensland ====
▌ David Batt (LNP—Hinkler)
▌ Angie Bell (LNP—Moncrieff)
▌ Colin Boyce (LNP—Flynn)
▌ Scott Buchholz (LNP—Wright)
▌ Cameron Caldwell (LNP—Fadden)
▌ Julie-Ann Campbell (ALP—Moreton)
▌ Jim Chalmers (ALP—Rankin)
▌ Renee Coffey (ALP—Griffith)
▌ Emma Comer (ALP—Petrie)
▌ Kara Cook (ALP—Bonner)
▌ Milton Dick (ALP—Oxley)
▌ Ali France (ALP—Dickson)
▌ Garth Hamilton (LNP—Groom)
▌ Rowan Holzberger (ALP—Forde)
▌ Madonna Jarrett (ALP—Brisbane)
▌ Bob Katter (KAP—Kennedy)
▌ Michelle Landry (LNP—Capricornia)
▌ David Littleproud (LNP—Maranoa)
▌ Shayne Neumann (ALP—Blair)
▌ Llew O'Brien (LNP—Wide Bay)
▌ Ted O'Brien (LNP—Fairfax)
▌ Henry Pike (LNP—Bowman)
▌ Leon Rebello (LNP—McPherson)
▌ Matt Smith (ALP—Leichhardt)
▌ Phillip Thompson (LNP—Herbert)
▌ Andrew Wallace (LNP—Fisher)
▌ Elizabeth Watson-Brown (AG—Ryan)
▌ Anika Wells (ALP—Lilley)
▌ Andrew Willcox (LNP—Dawson)
▌ Terry Young (LNP—Longman)

==== South Australia ====
▌ Matt Burnell (ALP—Spence)
▌ Mark Butler (ALP—Hindmarsh)
▌ Claire Clutterham (ALP—Sturt)
▌ Steve Georganas (ALP—Adelaide)
▌ Louise Miller-Frost (ALP—Boothby)
▌ Tony Pasin (LP—Barker)
▌ Amanda Rishworth (ALP—Kingston)
▌ Rebekha Sharkie (CA—Mayo)
▌ Tom Venning (LP—Grey)
▌ Tony Zappia (ALP—Makin)

==== Tasmania ====
▌ Julie Collins (ALP—Franklin)
▌ Jess Teesdale (ALP—Bass)
▌ Anne Urquhart (ALP—Braddon)
▌ Rebecca White (ALP—Lyons)
▌ Andrew Wilkie (IND—Clark)

==== Victoria ====
▌ Basem Abdo (ALP—Calwell)
▌ Mary Aldred (LP—Monash)
▌ Jodie Belyea (ALP—Dunkley)
▌ Sam Birrell (NAT—Nicholls)
▌ Jo Briskey (ALP—Maribyrnong)
▌ Josh Burns (ALP—Macnamara)
▌ Darren Chester (NAT—Gippsland)
▌ Lisa Chesters (ALP—Bendigo)
▌ Libby Coker (ALP—Corangamite)
▌ Mary Doyle (ALP—Aston)
▌ Mark Dreyfus (ALP—Isaacs)
▌ Cassandra Fernando (ALP—Holt)
▌ Carina Garland (ALP—Chisholm)
▌ Andrew Giles (ALP—Scullin)
▌ Matt Gregg (ALP—Deakin)
▌ Helen Haines (IND—Indi)
▌ Julian Hill (ALP—Bruce)
▌ Alice Jordan-Baird (ALP—Gorton)
▌ Ged Kearney (ALP—Cooper)
▌ Peter Khalil (ALP—Wills)
▌ Catherine King (ALP—Ballarat)
▌ Richard Marles (ALP—Corio)
▌ Zoe McKenzie (LP—Flinders)
▌ Rob Mitchell (ALP—McEwen)
▌ Daniel Mulino (ALP—Fraser)
▌ Gabriel Ng (ALP—Menzies)
▌ Clare O'Neil (ALP—Hotham)
▌ Sam Rae (ALP—Hawke)
▌ Joanne Ryan (ALP—Lalor)
▌ Monique Ryan (IND—Kooyong)
▌ Dan Tehan (LP—Wannon)
▌ Kate Thwaites (ALP—Jagajaga)
▌ Aaron Violi (LP—Casey)
▌ Tim Watts (ALP—Gellibrand)
▌ Anne Webster (NAT—Mallee)
▌ Tim Wilson (LP—Goldstein)
▌ Sarah Witty (ALP—Melbourne)
▌ Jason Wood (LP—La Trobe)

==== Western Australia ====
▌ Anne Aly (ALP—Cowan)
▌ Kate Chaney (IND—Curtin)
▌ Trish Cook (ALP—Bullwinkel)
▌ Tom French (ALP—Moore)
▌ Patrick Gorman (ALP—Perth)
▌ Andrew Hastie (LP—Canning)
▌ Matt Keogh (ALP—Burt)
▌ Madeleine King (ALP—Brand)
▌ Tania Lawrence (ALP—Hasluck)
▌ Sam Lim (ALP—Tangney)
▌ Zaneta Mascarenhas (ALP—Swan)
▌ Melissa Price (LP—Durack)
▌ Tracey Roberts (ALP—Pearce)
▌ Ben Small (LP—Forrest)
▌ Josh Wilson (ALP—Fremantle)
▌ Rick Wilson (LP—O'Connor)

== Changes in membership ==
=== Senate ===
This table lists senators who have resigned, died, been elected or appointed, or otherwise changed their party affiliation during the 48th Parliament.

Seat	Before		Change		After		
Seat	Member	Party	Type	Date	Date	Member	Party
Before the opening of the 48th Parliament
Tasmania	Anne Urquhart	Labor	Resignation	28 March 2025	27 May 2025	Josh Dolega	Labor
Northern Territory	Jacinta Nampijinpa Price	National	Switching party-room	9 May 2025		Jacinta Nampijinpa Price	Liberal
Western Australia	Dorinda Cox	Greens	Joined new party	2 June 2025		Dorinda Cox	Labor
After the opening of the 48th Parliament
New South Wales	Warwick Stacey	One Nation	Resignation	19 August 2025	18 September 2025	Sean Bell	One Nation
Tasmania	Tammy Tyrrell	Tyrrell for Tasmania	Joined new party	14 May 2026		Tammy Tyrrell	Labor
Tasmania	Wendy Askew	Liberal	Resignation	10 August 2026	13 August 2026	Chris Gatenby	Liberal
Tasmania	Peter Whish-Wilson	Greens	Resignation	14 August 2026	20 August 2026	Vanessa Bleyer	Greens
Tasmania	Jonathan Duniam	Liberal	Resignation	Late 2026 (TBD)	Late 2026 (TBD)	Sarah Courtney (designate)	Liberal

=== House of Representatives ===
This table lists members of the House who have resigned, died, been elected or appointed, or otherwise changed their party affiliation during the 48th Parliament.

Seat	Before		Change		After		
Seat	Member	Party	Type	Date	Date	Member	Party
New England	Barnaby Joyce	National	Resignation from party	27 November 2025		Barnaby Joyce	Independent
New England	Barnaby Joyce	Independent	Joined new party	8 December 2025		Barnaby Joyce	One Nation
Farrer	Sussan Ley	Liberal	Resignation	27 February 2026	9 May 2026	David Farley	One Nation
Wentworth	Allegra Spender	Independent	Founded new party	25 June 2026		Allegra Spender	Community Strong
Warringah	Zali Steggall	Independent	Founded new party	25 June 2026		Zali Steggall	Community Strong
