= 2025 Australian Senate election =

Australian federal election results

2025 Australian federal election (Senate)
- 3 May 2025

40 of the 76 seats in the Australian Senate 39 seats needed for a majority
- Registered: 18,098,797 ▲5.0% (98.2% of eligible)
- Turnout: 90.86% (▲0.39 pp)
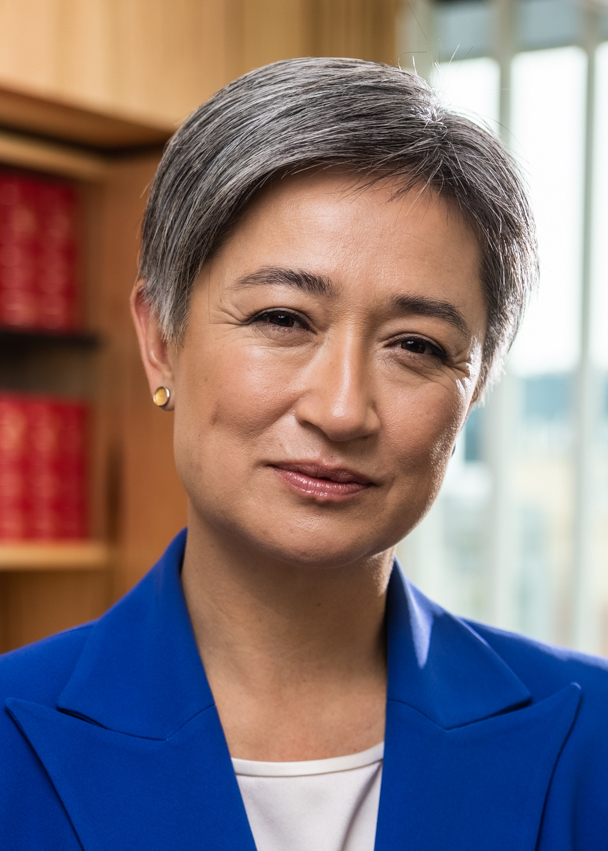

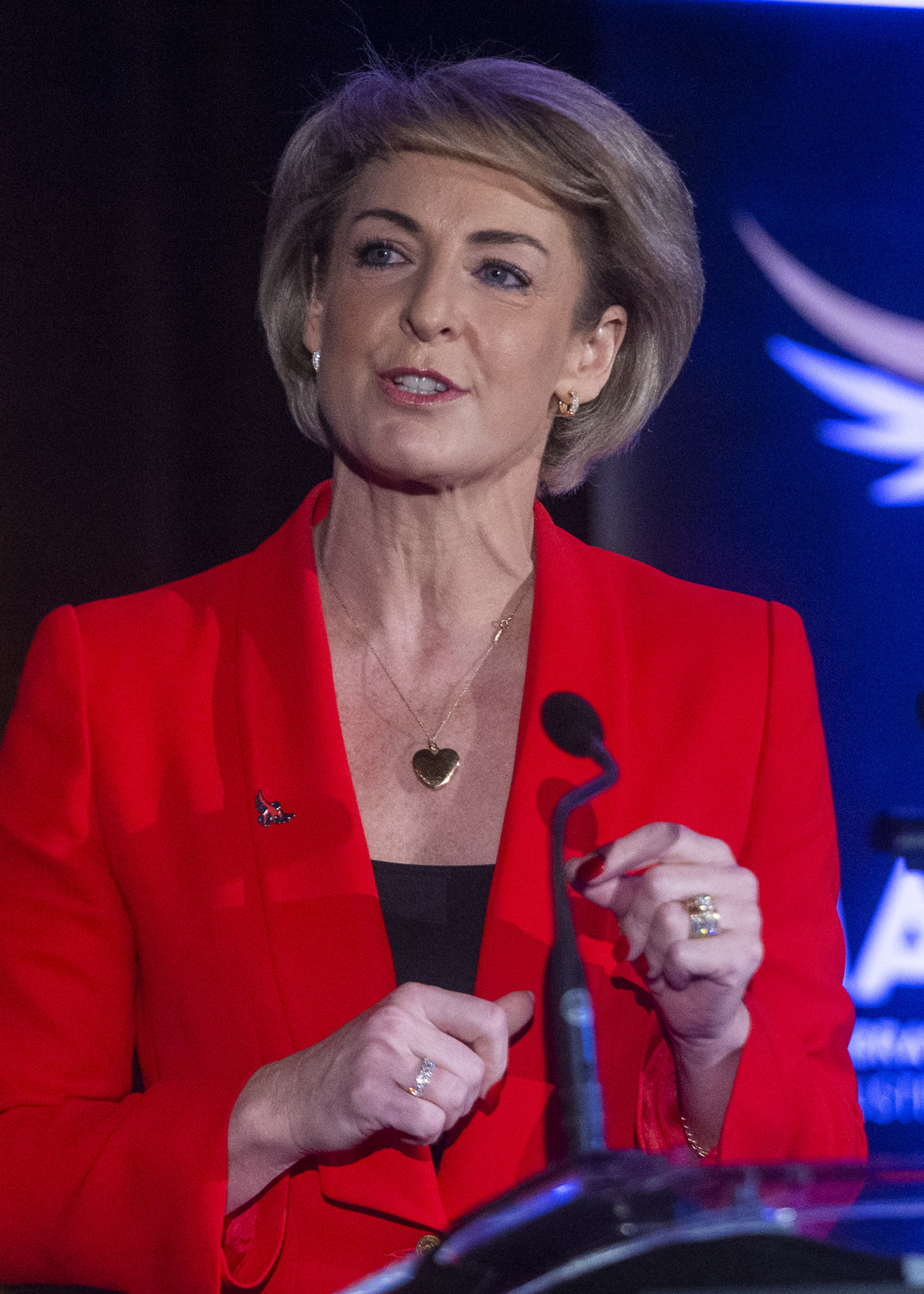

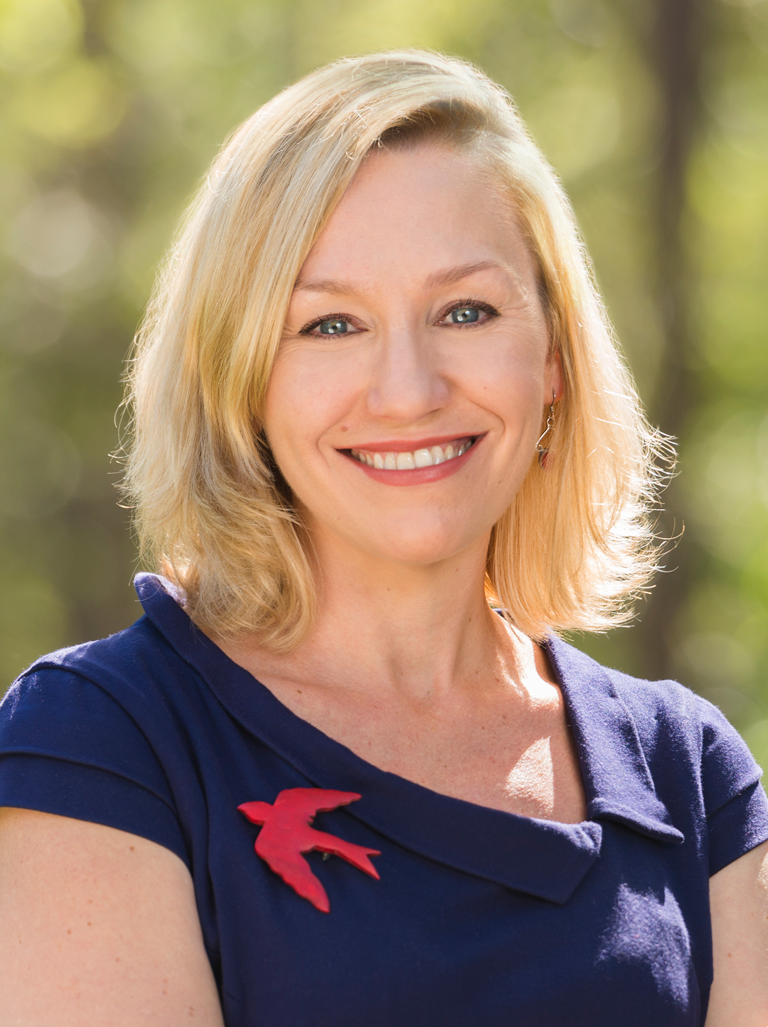

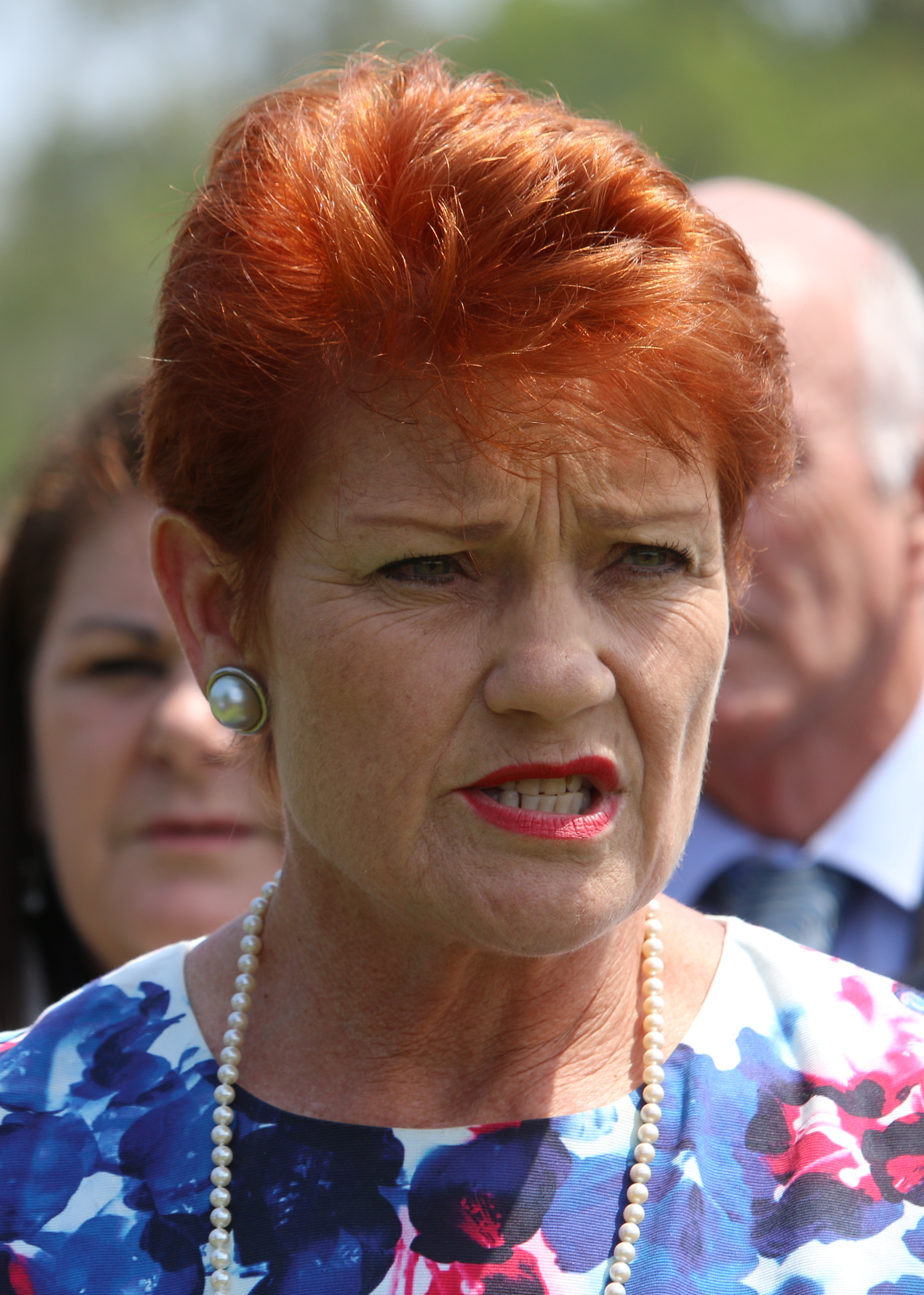

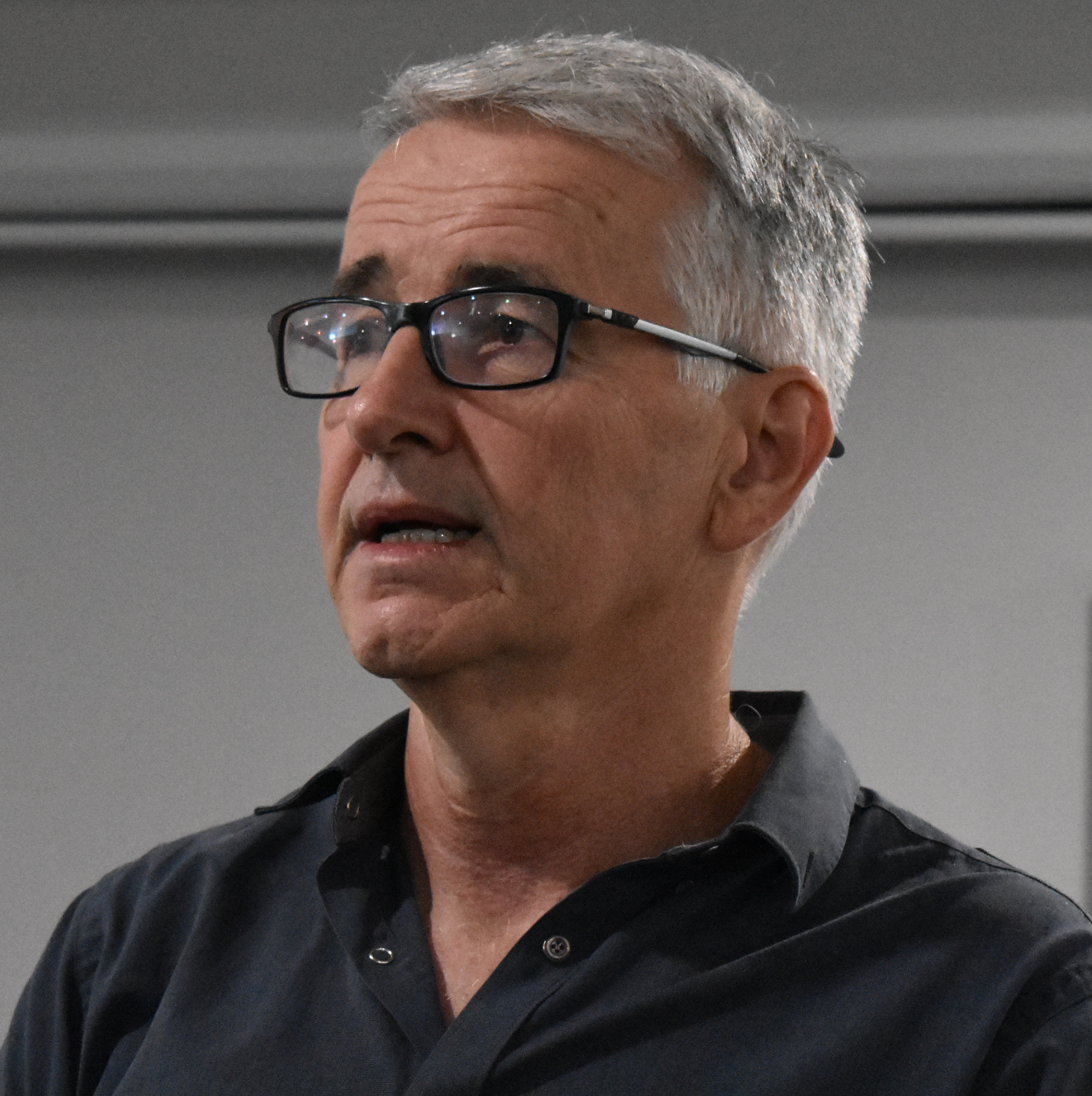

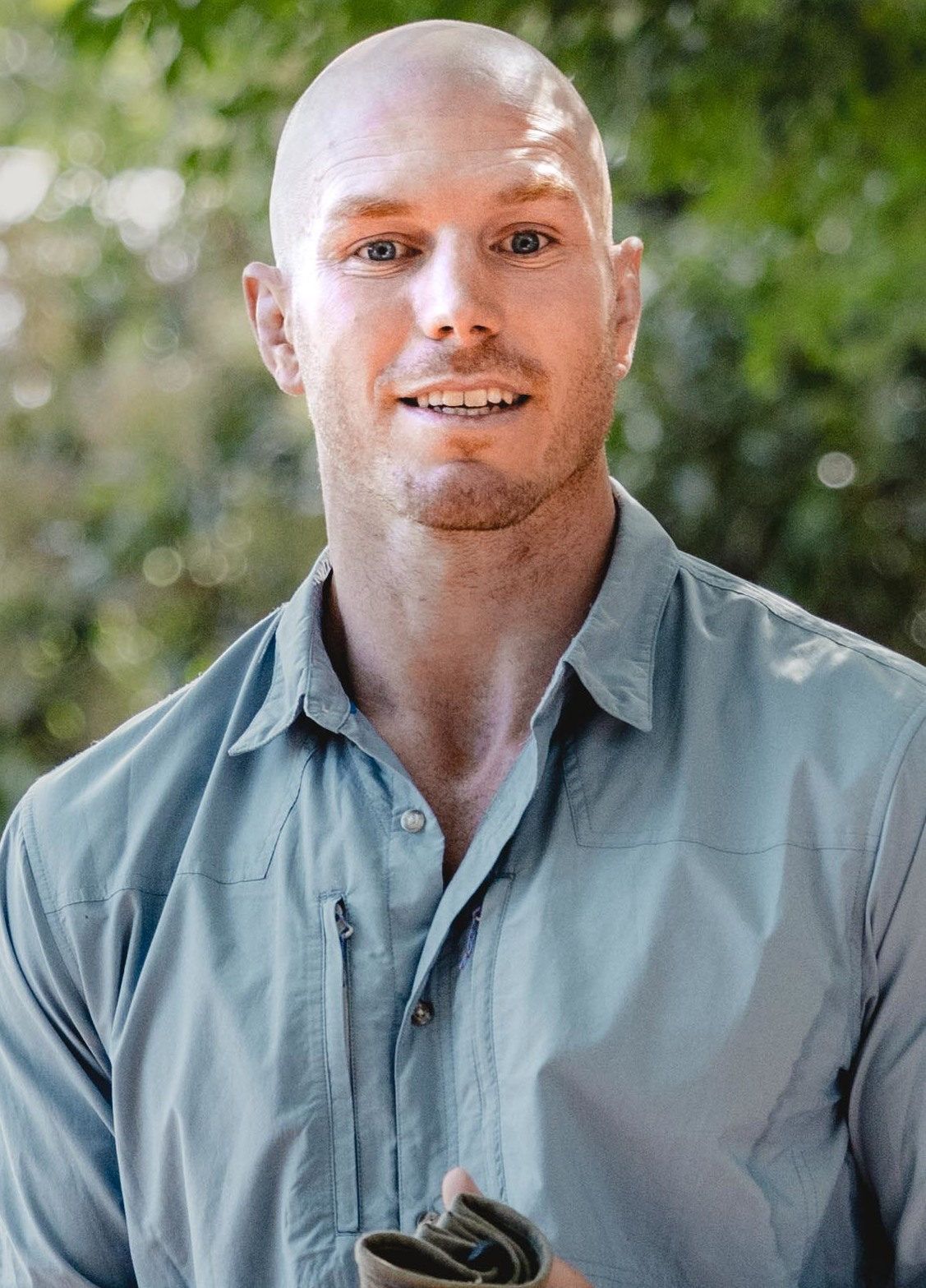

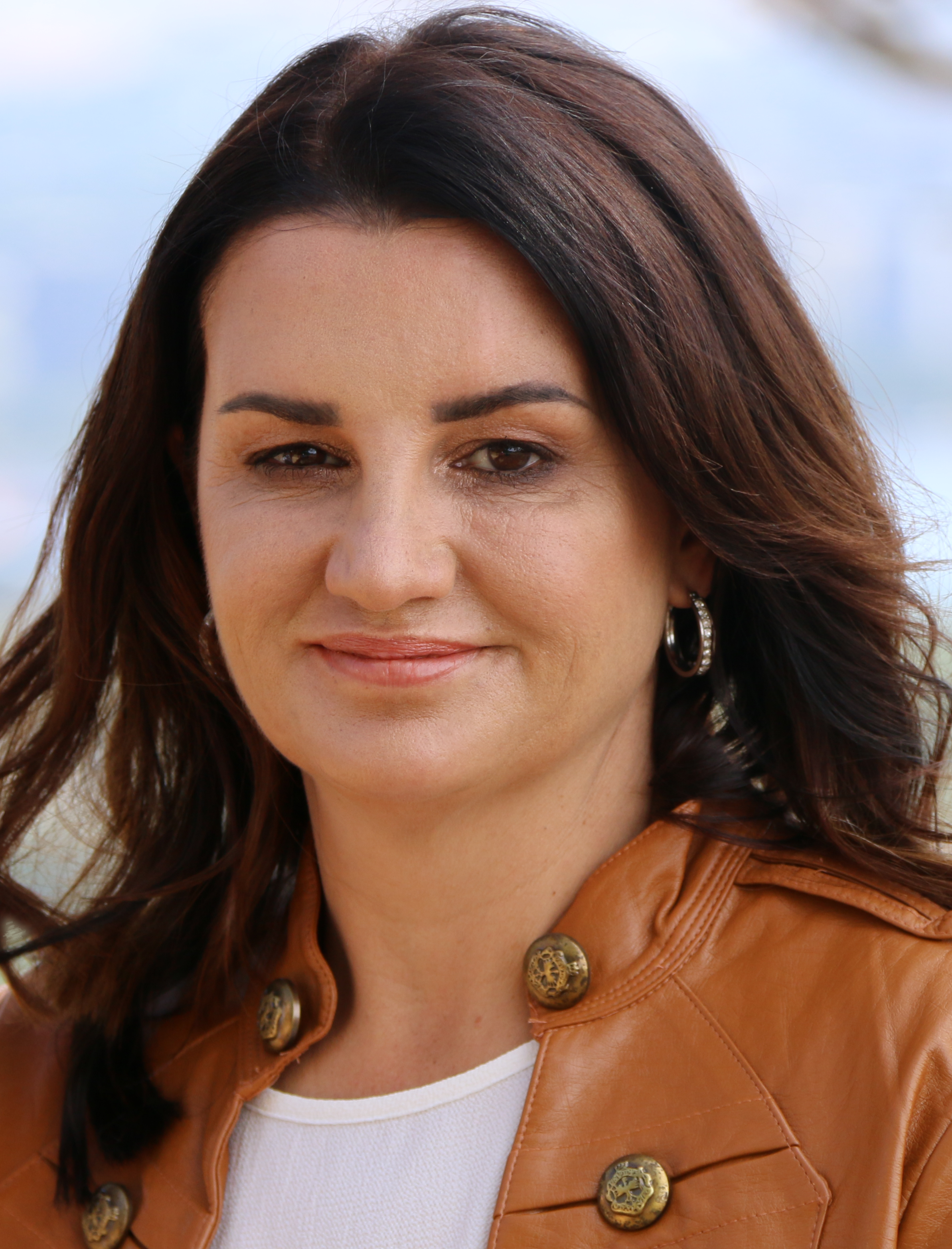

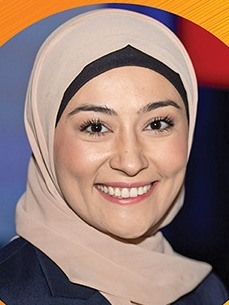
	First party	Second party	Third party
Leader	Penny Wong	Michaelia Cash	Larissa Waters
Party	Labor	Liberal–National Coalition	Greens
Leader since	26 June 2013	25 January 2025	4 February 2020
Leader's seat	South Australia (not up for election)	Western Australia (not up for election)	Queensland
Seats before	25	30	11
Seats won	16	13	6
Seats after	28	27	11
Seat change	▲3	▼3	Steady
Primary vote	5,573,028	4,744,580	1,859,974
Percentage	35.11	29.89	11.72
Swing	▲5.02 pp	▼4.35 pp	▼0.94 pp
	Fourth party	Fifth party	Sixth party
Leader	Pauline Hanson	Gerard Rennick	David Pocock
Party	One Nation	People First	David Pocock
Leader since	29 November 2014	25 August 2024	16 December 2021
Leader's seat	Queensland (not up for election)	Queensland (lost seat)	Australian Capital Territory
Seats before	2	1	1
Seats won	3	0	1
Seats after	4	0	1
Seat change	▲2	▼1	Steady
Primary vote	899,296	151,310	114,915
Percentage	5.67	0.95	0.72
Swing	▲1.38 pp	Steady	▲0.32 pp
	Seventh party	Eighth party
Leader	Jacqui Lambie	Fatima Payman
Party	Lambie Network	Australia's Voice
Leader since	14 May 2015	9 October 2024
Leader's seat	Tasmania	Western Australia (not up for election)
Seats before	1	1
Seats won	1	0
Seats after	1	1
Seat change	Steady	Steady
Primary vote	166,085	119,717
Percentage	1.05	0.75
Swing	▲0.84 pp	▲0.75 pp
Senate Leader before election
Penny Wong
Labor
Subsequent Senate Leader
Penny Wong
Labor

The 2025 Australian Senate election was held on Saturday, 3 May 2025 to elect 40 of the 76 senators in the Australian Senate as part of the 2025 federal election. Elected senators took office on 1 July 2025, with the exception of the senators elected from the two territories whose terms commenced from election day. The elected senators sat alongside continuing senators elected in 2022 as part of the 48th Parliament of Australia.

Labor was set to hold 28 seats in the new Senate, making this the first time Labor was the largest party in the Senate since the 1984 election. On 2 June 2025, Greens Senator Dorinda Cox left the Greens and joined Labor, taking the number of Labor Senators to 29 in the new parliament beginning on 1 July 2025.

== Australia ==
Government (28) Labor (28) Opposition (27) Coalition Liberal (20) LNP (Qld) (4) (Note: Two LNP senators sit in the National party room and two sit in the Liberal party room) National (2) CLP (NT) (1) (Note: The CLP senator, Jacinta Nampijinpa Price, sat in the National party room, though changed allegiance to the Liberals shortly after the election.) Crossbench (18) Greens (11) One Nation (4) Lambie Network (1) United Australia (1) Independent (1)

Senate (STV) – Turnout 90.68% (CV)
Group (Note: Parties and candidates may run together in one group, where group votes are allocated top-down within that group.)	First preference			Seats			
Group	Votes	%	Swing (pp)	Seats won	Not up	New total	+/−
Labor	5,573,028	35.11	+5.02	16	12	28	▲3
Liberal–National Coalition	4,744,580	29.89	−4.35	13	14	27	▼3
Liberal/Nationals (joint)	2,756,296	17.37	−2.56	4	5	9	▼1
Liberal National (QLD)	997,404	6.28	−0.78	2	2	4	Steady
Liberal	892,188	5.62	−1.38	6	7	13	▼2
Country Liberal (NT)	34,954	0.22	+0.00	1	0	1	Steady
Greens	1,859,974	11.72	−0.94	6	5	11	Steady
One Nation	899,296	5.67	+1.38	3	1	4	▲2
Legalise Cannabis	553,163	3.49	+0.16	0	0	0	Steady
Trumpet of Patriots	413,238	2.60	+2.38 (Note: As Australian Federation Party)	0	0	0	Steady
Family First	236,728	1.49	New	0	0	0	Steady
Animal Justice	198,611	1.25	−0.35	0	0	0	Steady
Lambie	166,085	1.05	+0.84	1	0	1	Steady
People First/Katter's Australian (QLD)	151,310	0.95	New	0	0	0	▼1
Australia's Voice	119,717	0.75	+0.75	0	1	1	Steady
David Pocock	114,915	0.72	+0.32	1	0	1	Steady
Christians	102,519	0.65	+0.43	0	0	0	Steady
Indigenous-Aboriginal	101,508	0.64	+0.16	0	0	0	Steady
Libertarian/HEART/People First (NSW)	92,892	0.59	New	0	0	0	Steady
Nationals (WA)/(SA)	63,738	0.40	+0.37	0	0	0	Steady
Libertarian	63,572	0.40	+0.40	0	0	0	Steady
Victorian Socialists	63,093	0.40	+0.26	0	0	0	Steady
Shooters, Fishers, Farmers	59,434	0.37	−0.61	0	0	0	Steady
Sustainable Australia	58,090	0.37	−0.15	0	0	0	Steady
FUSION	46,007	0.29	−0.05	0	0	0	Steady
People First/HEART (VIC)	44,080	0.28	New	0	0	0	Steady
Socialist Alliance	37,813	0.24	+0.05	0	0	0	Steady
Democrats	37,734	0.24	−0.20	0	0	0	Steady
People First	37,505	0.24	New	0	0	0	Steady
Citizens	35,432	0.22	+0.02	0	0	0	Steady
Unendorsed/Ungrouped/Independents	36,245	0.23	−0.67	0	1	1	▼1
Great Australian	15,249	0.10	−0.45	0	0	0	Steady
Great Australian/HEART (QLD)	5,927	0.04	New	0	0	0	Steady
HEART/Libertarian (ACT)	3,444	0.02	New	0	0	0	Steady
Tammy Tyrrell for Tasmania (TAS)	—N/a (Note: Did not run any candidates in this election.)			0	1	1	Steady
United Australia Party	—N/a (Note: The UAP was voluntarily de-registered in 2022 and, therefore, cannot appear on the ballot paper. Incumbent senator and party leader Ralph Babet is not up for election and is permitted to sit as a member of the UAP despite the party's de-registration.)			0	1	1	Steady
Total	15,871,189	–	–	40	36	76	–
Informal votes	567,305	3.45	+0.03				
Turnout	16,438,494	90.83	+0.36				
Registered voters	18,098,797	–	–				
Source: AEC, ABC

== Result by states ==
=== New South Wales ===
2025 Australian federal election: Senate, New South Wales
Party	Candidate	Votes	%	±%
Quota		712,405		
Labor	1. Tony Sheldon (elected 1); 2. Tim Ayres (elected 3); 3. Emilija Beljic; 4. Victoria McGregor; 5. Sharon Sewell; 6. Heather Roarty	1,876,713	37.63	+7.19
Liberal/National Coalition	1. Andrew Bragg (Lib) (elected 2); 2. Jessica Collins (Lib) (elected 4); 3. Perin Davey (Nat); 4. Hollie Hughes (Lib); 5. Juliana McArthur (Nat); 6. Rhiannon Brinsmead (Lib)	1,467,940	29.44	–7.29
Greens	1. Mehreen Faruqi (elected 5); 2. Eddie Lloyd; 3. Sujan Selventhiran; 4. Barbara Bloch; 5. Ethan Floyd; 6. Rachael Jacobs	557,610	11.18	−0.28
One Nation	1. Warwick Stacey (elected 6); 2. Rebecca Thompson	302,438	6.06	+1.93
Legalise Cannabis	1. Miles Hunt; 2. Michael Balderstone; 3. Tia Elliston	174,280	3.49	+0.89
Trumpet of Patriots	1. Silvana Nile; 2. Andrew Robertson; 3. Michelle Martin	119,670	2.40	+2.40
Libertarian–HEART–People First joint ticket	1. Craig Kelly (LP); 2. Michael O'Neill (HEART); 3. Tracy Sedman (PFP); 4. Steve Christou (LP); 5. Sonia Qutami (HEART)	92,892	1.86	+1.86
Family First	1. Lyle Shelton; 2. Roseanne Masters	80,560	1.62	+1.62
Animal Justice	1. Emma Kerin; 2. Matt Stellino	60,029	1.20	−0.95
Christians	1. Asher Wolfson; 2. Duncan Gregg Fischer	59,146	1.19	+1.19
Lambie	1. Glenn Raymond Kolomeitz; 2. Nikhita Sahay	52,897	1.06	+1.06
Australia's Voice	1. Emanie Samira Darwiche; 2. Graham George	36,792	0.74	+0.74
Indigenous-Aboriginal	1. Owen D. Whyman; 2. Lawrence John Brooke	32,344	0.65	−0.16
Sustainable Australia	1. William Bourke; 2. Petra Campbell	16,173	0.32	−0.21
Fusion	1. Miles Whiticker; 2. Andrew Potts	16,532	0.33	−0.04
Socialist Alliance	1. Peter Boyle; 2. Andrew Chuter	12,524	0.25	+0.08
Group B	1. Max Boddy; 2. Warwick Dove	11,962	0.24	+0.06
Citizens	1. Andy Schmulow; 2. Ann Lawler	10,655	0.21	−0.09
Ungrouped	Kerrie Christina Harris; Shawn Price; Warren Grzic	5,675	0.11	−0.03
Total formal votes		4,986,832	95.55	−0.54
Informal votes		232,509	4.45	+0.54
Turnout		5,219,341	91.65	+0.28

#	Senator	Party
1	Tony Sheldon	Labor
2	Andrew Bragg	Liberal
3	Tim Ayres	Labor
4	Jessica Collins	Liberal
5	Mehreen Faruqi	Greens
6	Warwick Stacey	One Nation

=== Victoria ===
2025 Australian federal election: Senate, Victoria
Party	Candidate	Votes	%	±%
Quota		585,967		
Labor	1. Raff Ciccone (elected 1); 2. Jess Walsh (elected 3); 3. Michelle Ananda-Rajah (elected 6); 4. Lynn Psaila; 5. Stephenie Kelley; 6. David Baker	1,422,364	34.68	+3.23
Liberal/National Coalition	1. James Paterson (Lib) (elected 2); 2. Jane Hume (Lib) (elected 4); 3. Kyle Hoppitt (Lib); 4. Glenn Arnold (Nat); 5. Greg Mirabella (Lib); 6. Chrestyna Kmetj (Lib)	1,288,356	31.41	–0.88
Greens	1. Steph Hodgins-May (elected 5); 2. Navera Ari; 3. Rachel Iampolski; 4. Maddie Slater; 5. Brittney Henderson; 6. Nasser Yawari	510,835	12.45	−1.40
One Nation	1. Warren Pickering; 2. Christopher Bradbury	182,228	4.44	+1.53
Legalise Cannabis	1. Fiona Patten; 2. Alice Davy; 3. Shea Evans	148,739	3.63	+0.63
Trumpet of Patriots	1. James William Unkles; 2. Ron Jean; 3. Roger Ivan McKay	103,552	2.52	+2.20
Family First	1. Bernie Finn; 2. Jane Foreman	74,609	1.82	+1.82
Animal Justice	1. Helen Jeges; 2. Benjamin McMillan	64,555	1.57	+0.06
Victorian Socialists	1. Jordan van den Lamb; 2. Steph Price	63,093	1.54	+0.97
Shooters, Fishers, Farmers	1. Ethan Constantinou; 2. Ken Vickers	50,982	1.24	−0.06
People First–HEART joint ticket	1. Chris Neil (PFP); 2. Nick Clonaridis (HEART)	44,080	1.07	+1.07
Australia's Voice	1. Mohamed El-Masri; 2. Harsimran Kaur; 3. Rasheed El Achkar	39,819	0.97	+0.97
Indigenous-Aboriginal	1. Racquel Austin-Abdullah; 2. Laylah Al-Saimary	26,513	0.65	+0.65
Libertarian	1. Jordan Dittloff; 2. Matthew Ford; 3. Stephen Matulec	23,617	0.58	+0.58
Democrats	1. Heath McKenzie; 2. Carly Noble	17,016	0.41	−0.34
Sustainable Australia	1. Celeste Ackerly; 2. Bert Jessup	10,763	0.26	−0.20
Fusion	1. Kammy Cordner Hunt; 2. Simon Mark Simcha Gnieslaw	10,704	0.26	−0.10
Citizens	1. Robert Barwick; 2. Sleiman Yohanna	9,810	0.24	+0.10
Group G	1. Keo Vongvixay; 2. Taylor Hernan	4,028	0.10	+0.10
Ungrouped	Heena Sinha Cheung; Susantha Abeysinghe; Viesha Lewand; Lawrence Harvey; Cory Corbett; K. Black; David Van; Nate Ritter	3,996	0.10	−0.12
Group T	1. Raj Saini; 2. Kirti Alle; 3. Yashaswini Srinivas Kanakagiri	2,103	0.05	+0.05
Total formal votes		4,101,762	96.92	+0.44
Informal votes		130,300	3.08	−0.44
Turnout		4,232,062	92.40	+1.13

#	Senator	Party
1	Raff Ciccone	Labor
2	James Paterson	Liberal
3	Jess Walsh	Labor
4	Jane Hume	Liberal
5	Steph Hodgins-May	Greens
6	Michelle Ananda-Rajah	Labor

=== Queensland ===
2025 Australian federal election: Senate, Queensland
Party	Candidate	Votes	%	±%
Quota		460,634		
Liberal National	1. Paul Scarr (elected 1); 2. Susan McDonald (elected 3); 3. Stuart Fraser; 4. Sophia Li; 5. Yvonne Tunney; 6. Peter Zhuang	997,404	30.93	−4.30
Labor	1. Nita Green (elected 2); 2. Corinne Mulholland (elected 4); 3. Peter Casey; 4. Danielle Shankey; 5. Melinda Chisholm; 6. Brianna Bailey	982,811	30.48	+5.79
Greens	1. Larissa Waters (elected 5); 2. Navdeep Singh Sidhu; 3. Claire Garton; 4. Jennifer Cox; 5. Melissa McArdle; 6. Kirsten Kennedy	337,746	10.47	−1.92
One Nation	1. Malcolm Roberts (elected 6); 2. Geena Court	229,746	7.13	−0.27
People First–Katter's Australian joint ticket	1. Gerard Rennick (PFP); 2. Robert Lyon (KAP)	151,310	4.69	+4.69
Trumpet of Patriots	1. Harry Fong; 2. Robert McMullan; 3. David McClaer	117,700	3.65	+3.41
Legalise Cannabis	1. Belinda Jones; 2. Melody Lindsay	113,187	3.51	−1.86
Family First	1. Katie Lush; 2. Karen Fuller	58,005	1.80	+1.80
Lambie	1. Ange Harper; 2. Craig Schramm	54,617	1.69	+1.69
Indigenous-Aboriginal	1. Wayne CoCo Wharton; 2. Marnie Laree Davis	42,651	1.32	+0.23
Animal Justice	1. Michelle Jensz; 2. Gregory Dillon	31,974	0.99	−0.30
Australia's Voice	1. Michelle McDonald; 2. Cameron McClure Leckie; 3. Aidan McGuire	23,926	0.74	+0.74
Socialist Alliance	1. Jonathan Strauss; 2. Kamala Emanuel	21,315	0.66	+0.31
Libertarian	1. Jim Willmott; 2. Lachlan Lade	14,718	0.46	+0.46
Democrats	1. Scott Frazer Roberts; 2. Luke Daniel Pullar	14,200	0.44	+0.06
Fusion	1. Chris Simpson; 2. Frank Jordan	9,714	0.30	−0.07
Sustainable Australia	1. Rhett Martin; 2. Ross Honniball	7,744	0.24	−0.40
Citizens	1. Jan Pukallus; 2. Richard Frederick Healy	6,266	0.19	−0.01
Great Australian–HEART joint ticket	1. William Bay (resigned); 2. Catherine Smith	5,927	0.18	+0.18
Ungrouped	Gilbert Holmes; Danny Donohue; Duke Wong; Jason Brown	3,475	0.11	−0.98
Total formal votes		3,224,436	96.95	+0.07
Informal votes		101,604	3.05	−0.07
Turnout		3,326,040	88.98	+0.13

#	Senator	Party
1	Paul Scarr	Liberal National
2	Nita Green	Labor
3	Susan McDonald	Liberal National
4	Corinne Mulholland	Labor
5	Larissa Waters	Greens
6	Malcolm Roberts	One Nation

=== Western Australia ===
2025 Australian federal election: Senate, Western Australia
Party	Candidate	Votes	%	±%
Quota		231,717		
Labor	1. Ellie Whiteaker (elected 1); 2. Varun Ghosh (elected 3); 3. Deep Singh; 4. Tarun Dewan; 5. Ally White; 6. Brock Oswald	586,692	36.17	+1.62
Liberal	1. Slade Brockman (elected 2); 2. Matt O'Sullivan (elected 5); 3. Trish Botha; 4. Jennifer Mathews	431,607	26.61	–5.06
Greens	1. Jordon Steele-John (elected 4); 2. Simone Collins; 3. Donald Clarke; 4. Verity Ives; 5. Heather Lonsdale	208,327	12.84	−1.42
One Nation	1. Tyron Whitten (elected 6); 2. Conor Doyle	95,230	5.87	+2.38
Legalise Cannabis	1. Jason Meotti; 2. Melissa Rose D'Ath	65,340	4.03	+0.65
National	1. Paul Brown; 2. Jeremy Miles	58,043	3.58	+3.58
Christians	1. Steve Klomp; 2. Joan Lee Ng	43,373	2.67	+0.50
Trumpet of Patriots	1. Melissa Bannister; 2. Trent Kenneth Mongan; 3. Peter Robins; 4. Lincoln Stewart (resigned)	27,183	1.68	+1.13
People First	1. Madison King; 2. Jody Clune	24,043	1.48	+1.48
Animal Justice	1. Michael Anagno; 2. Grant Stewart	18,019	1.11	+0.18
Great Australian	1. Rod Culleton; 2. William Newton-Wordsworth	15,249	0.94	−0.11
Australia's Voice	1. Megan Krakouer; 2. Tano La Macchia	11,139	0.69	+0.69
Libertarian	1. Ryan Burns; 2. Gary Nicol	10,288	0.63	+0.63
Sustainable Australia	1. Karen Oborn; 2. Ryan Oostryck	7,104	0.44	+0.06
Democrats	1. Elana Mitchell; 2. Simon Simson	6,518	0.40	+0.10
Citizens	1. Aisha Nancy Novakovich; 2. Rex Michael Ryles	4,779	0.29	+0.17
Socialist Alliance	1. Jade Sobieralski; 2. Riley Breen	3,974	0.25	+0.09
Fusion	1. Tian Carrie-Wilson; 2. Tamara Alderdice	3,615	0.22	−0.13
Ungrouped	Ky Cao; Kim Mubarak	1,493	0.09	−0.26
Total formal votes		1,622,016	97.40	+0.31
Informal votes		43,331	2.60	−0.31
Turnout		1,665,347	88.17	−0.53

#	Senator	Party
1	Ellie Whiteaker	Labor
2	Slade Brockman	Liberal
3	Varun Ghosh	Labor
4	Jordon Steele-John	Greens
5	Matt O'Sullivan	Liberal
6	Tyron Whitten	One Nation

=== South Australia ===
2025 Australian federal election: Senate, South Australia
Party	Candidate	Votes	%	±%
Quota		166,297		
Labor	1. Marielle Smith (elected 1); 2. Karen Grogan (elected 3); 3. Charlotte Walker (elected 6); 4. Jennifer Allison	442,995	38.06	+5.80
Liberal	1. Alex Antic (elected 2); 2. Anne Ruston (elected 4); 3. David Fawcett; 4. Damian Wyld	320,932	27.57	–6.36
Greens	1. Sarah Hanson-Young (elected 5); 2. Noah Schultz-Byard	150,148	12.90	+0.95
One Nation	1. Jennifer Game; 2. Carlos Quaremba	62,131	5.34	+1.33
Legalise Cannabis	1. Jessica Nies; 2. Timothy John Hall	33,292	2.86	+0.54
Trumpet of Patriots	1. Nicole Smeltz; 2. Bob Day; 3. Antonio Rea; 4. Matilda Bawden	33,094	2.84	+2.41
Lambie	1. Rex Patrick; 2. Anne Elizabeth Fordham	31,516	2.71	+2.71
Family First	1. Frederick Christopher Brohier; 2. Deepa Mathew	23,554	2.02	+2.02
Animal Justice	1. Frankie Bray; 2. Julie Pastro	15,818	1.36	−0.40
People First	1. Rob Lonie; 2. Patrick J. Amadio	13,462	1.16	+1.16
Libertarian	1. Tyler Bradley Green; 2. Jacob Nicholas Van Raalte	11,817	1.02	+1.02
Australia's Voice	1. Jordan Shane; 2. Craig Michael Nielsen	8,041	0.69	+0.69
National	1. Monique Crossling; 2. Emma Azzopardi	5,695	0.49	+0.14
Fusion	1. Imelda Adamson Agars; 2. Drew Wolfendale	5,442	0.47	+0.14
Sustainable Australia	1. Madeleine Wearne; 2. Michael Dwyer	3,276	0.28	−0.03
Citizens	1. Louise Ackland; 2. Mark Freer	1,570	0.13	+0.02
Ungrouped	Kosta Hadjimarkou; Janette Gail Francis	1,289	0.11	−3.41
Total formal votes		1,164,072	96.84	−0.24
Informal votes		38,042	3.16	+0.24
Turnout		1,202,114	91.98	+0.48

#	Senator	Party
1	Marielle Smith	Labor
2	Alex Antic	Liberal
3	Karen Grogan	Labor
4	Anne Ruston	Liberal
5	Sarah Hanson-Young	Greens
6	Charlotte Walker	Labor

=== Tasmania ===
2025 Australian federal election: Senate, Tasmania
Party	Candidate	Votes	%	±%
Quota		53,113		
Labor	1. Carol Brown (elected 1); 2. Richard Dowling (elected 4); 3. Bailey Falls; 4. Saxon O'Donnell; 5. Greg Luckman; 6. Amelia Louise Meyers	130,967	35.23	+8.19
Liberal	1. Claire Chandler (elected 2); 2. Richard Colbeck (elected 6); 3. Jacki Martin	87,514	23.54	–8.48
Greens	1. Nick McKim (elected 3); 2. Vanessa Bleyer; 3. Scott Jordan; 4. Trenton Hoare	60,650	16.31	+0.83
Lambie	1. Jacqui Lambie (elected 5); 2. Christine Hannan	27,055	7.28	−1.36
One Nation	1. Lee Hanson; 2. James Dunn	19,218	5.17	+1.29
Legalise Cannabis	1. Matt Owen; 2. Gail Hester	12,624	3.40	+0.37
Trumpet of Patriots	1. Wayne Leslie Moore; 2. Matt Kelly; 3. Greg Smith	12,039	3.24	+3.07
Shooters, Fishers, Farmers	1. Phillip Bigg; 2. Melanie Roach	8,452	2.27	+0.37
Animal Justice	1. Casey Davies; 2. Kate Elizabeth Lucas	4,853	1.31	−0.06
Sustainable Australia	1. Dennis Bilic; 2. Pierre Richardson	4,476	1.20	+0.24
Libertarian	1. Chrysten Abraham; 2. Nicole Armstrong	1,639	0.44	+0.44
Citizens	1. Daryl Staggard; 2. Ray Williams	1,219	0.33	+0.33
Ungrouped	Fenella Edwards	1,084	0.29	+0.06
Total formal votes		371,790	96.70	−0.10
Informal votes		12,670	3.30	+0.10
Turnout		384,460	93.39	+0.58

#	Senator	Party
1	Carol Brown	Labor
2	Claire Chandler	Liberal
3	Nick McKim	Greens
4	Richard Dowling	Labor
5	Jacqui Lambie	Lambie
6	Richard Colbeck	Liberal

== Result by territories ==
Under section 42 of the Commonwealth Electoral Act 1918, the senators representing the Australian territories (which do not have equal status as the Australian states under the Australian constitution) expire at the close of the day immediately before the day of the election.

=== Australian Capital Territory ===
2025 Australian federal election: Senate, Australian Capital Territory
Party	Candidate	Votes	%	±%
Quota		97,825		
David Pocock	1. David Pocock (elected 1); 2. Hannah Vardy	114,915	39.16	+17.98
Labor	1. Katy Gallagher (elected 2); 2. Janaline Oh	93,135	31.74	−1.63
Liberal	1. Jacob Vadakkedathu; 2. Hayune Lee	52,135	17.76	−7.04
Greens	1. Christina Hobbs; 2. Jo Rocke	22,838	7.78	−2.51
Sustainable Australia	1. James Holgate; 2. John Haydon	3,644	1.24	+0.67
HEART–Libertarian joint ticket	1. Elise Searson-Prakaash (HEART); 2. Martin Brown (LP)	3,444	1.17	+1.17
Animal Justice	1. Robyn Soxsmith; 2. Walter Kudrycz	3,363	1.15	+0.49
Total formal votes		293,474	98.24	−0.01
Informal votes		5,263	1.76	+0.01
Turnout		298,737	92.67	+0.22

#	Senator	Party
1	David Pocock	Pocock
2	Katy Gallagher	Labor

=== Northern Territory ===
2025 Australian federal election: Senate, Northern Territory
Party	Candidate	Votes	%	±%
Quota		35,603		
Labor	1. Malarndirri McCarthy (elected 1); 2. Michael William Alsop	37,351	34.97	+2.00
Country Liberal	1. Jacinta Nampijinpa Price (elected 2); 2. Dean Hersey	34,954	32.73	+1.03
Greens	1. Aia Newport; 2. Hugo Wells	11,820	11.07	−1.19
One Nation	1. Darren Nugent; 2. Caine Hewes	8,305	7.78	+7.78
Legalise Cannabis	1. Lance Alfred Lawrence; 2. Suzette Luyken	5,701	5.34	−0.89
Sustainable Australia	1. Ian Chivers; 2. Lamaan Whyte	4,910	4.60	+2.94
Libertarian	1. Jed Hansen; 2. Trevor Smith	1,493	1.40	+1.40
Ungrouped	Que Kenny	1,140	1.07	+0.50
Citizens	1. Lionel Wylie; 2. Trudy Campbell	1,133	1.06	+0.14
Total formal votes		106,807	96.75	−0.17
Informal votes		3,586	3.25	+0.17
Turnout		110,393	70.97	−2.33

#	Senator	Party
1	Malarndirri McCarthy	Labor
2	Jacinta Nampijinpa Price	CLP

== See also ==
- Candidates of the 2025 Australian Senate election
- Members of the Australian Senate, 2025–2028
