= Sean Bell =

Sean Bell may refer to:

- Killing of Sean Bell, the controversial killing of an African American by New York City police
- Sean Bell (politician), born 1987, senator in Australia
