= Linda Reynolds =

Australian politician

The Honourable Linda Reynolds CSC
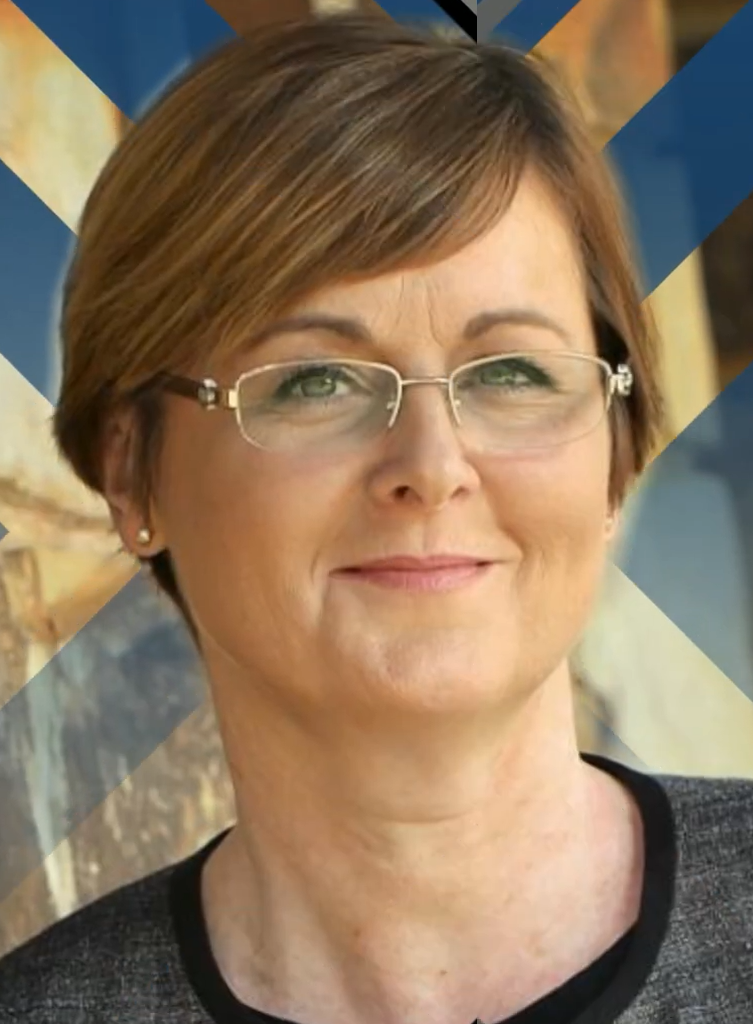

Minister for Government Services Minister for the National Disability Insurance Scheme
- In office 30 March 2021 – 23 May 2022
- Prime Minister: Scott Morrison
- Preceded by: Stuart Robert
- Succeeded by: Bill Shorten

Minister for Defence
- In office 29 May 2019 – 30 March 2021
- Prime Minister: Scott Morrison
- Deputy: Melissa Price
- Preceded by: Christopher Pyne
- Succeeded by: Peter Dutton

Minister for Defence Industry
- In office 2 March 2019 – 29 May 2019
- Prime Minister: Scott Morrison
- Preceded by: Steven Ciobo
- Succeeded by: Melissa Price

Minister for Emergency Management and North Queensland Recovery
- In office 2 March 2019 – 29 May 2019
- Prime Minister: Scott Morrison
- Preceded by: Position created
- Succeeded by: David Littleproud

Assistant Minister for Home Affairs
- In office 28 August 2018 – 2 March 2019
- Prime Minister: Scott Morrison
- Preceded by: Alex Hawke
- Succeeded by: Jason Wood

Senator for Western Australia
- In office 1 July 2014 – 30 June 2025
- Succeeded by: Tyron Whitten

Personal details
- Born: Linda Karen Reynolds; 16 May 1965 (age 61) Perth, Western Australia, Australia
- Party: Liberal
- Education: Curtin University
- Occupation: Politician
- Website: Official website

Military service
- Allegiance: Australia
- Branch/service: Australian Army Reserve
- Years of service: 1984–2012
- Rank: Brigadier
- Commands: 5th Combat Service Support Battalion
- Awards: Conspicuous Service Cross

Linda Karen Reynolds CSC (born 16 May 1965) is an Australian politician. She served as a Senator for Western Australia from 2014 to 2025, representing the Liberal Party, and held senior ministerial office as a cabinet minister in the Morrison government from 2019 to 2022.

Before entering parliament Reynolds was a member of the Australian Army Reserve for nearly 30 years and was the first woman in the reserve to attain the rank of brigadier. She was initially elected to the Senate at the 2013 federal election, but the result was voided and she was re-elected at a supplementary election in 2014. In the Morrison government she served as Assistant Minister for Home Affairs (2018–2019), Minister for Defence Industry (2019), Minister for Emergency Management and North Queensland Recovery (2019), Minister for Defence (2019–2021), and Minister for Government Services and the National Disability Insurance Scheme (2021–2022).

== Early life and education ==
Reynolds was born in Perth on 16 May 1965. She is the daughter of Laith and Jan Reynolds and has two brothers; she has said she was raised with "strong Christian values". Her grandfather Alfred Reynolds served in the Parliament of Western Australia as a member of the Australian Labor Party (ALP). Her maternal grandparents were English immigrants.

Reynolds grew up in the suburb of Gooseberry Hill and attended St Brigid's College. During her childhood she lived in Indonesia for a period where her father was a manager for Philips. The family learned to speak Indonesian and her mother took a degree in Indonesian studies.

Reynolds holds the degree of Bachelor of Commerce from Curtin University and also holds graduate certificates in training and development (Southern Cross University), defence management (University of Canberra) and strategic studies (Australian Defence College).

== Military career ==
Reynolds enlisted in the Australian Army Reserve in 1984, aged 19. She served variously as an officer cadet, regional logistics officer, training development officer, military instructor at the Army Command and Staff College, commanding officer of the 5th Combat Service Support Battalion, director of the Active Standby Staff Group, project director at the Canberra Deep Space Communications Complex, strategy development director of Raytheon Australia, director of the Accountability Model Implementation Project, and director of the Army Strategic Reform Program. She was adjutant general of the Army Reserve from 2012 to 2013. She was awarded the Conspicuous Service Cross in the 2011 Australia Day Honours for "outstanding achievement as the Director of Army Strategic Reform Program coordination". On attaining the rank of brigadier in 2012, Reynolds became the first woman in the Australian Army Reserve to be promoted to a star rank.

== Early political involvement ==
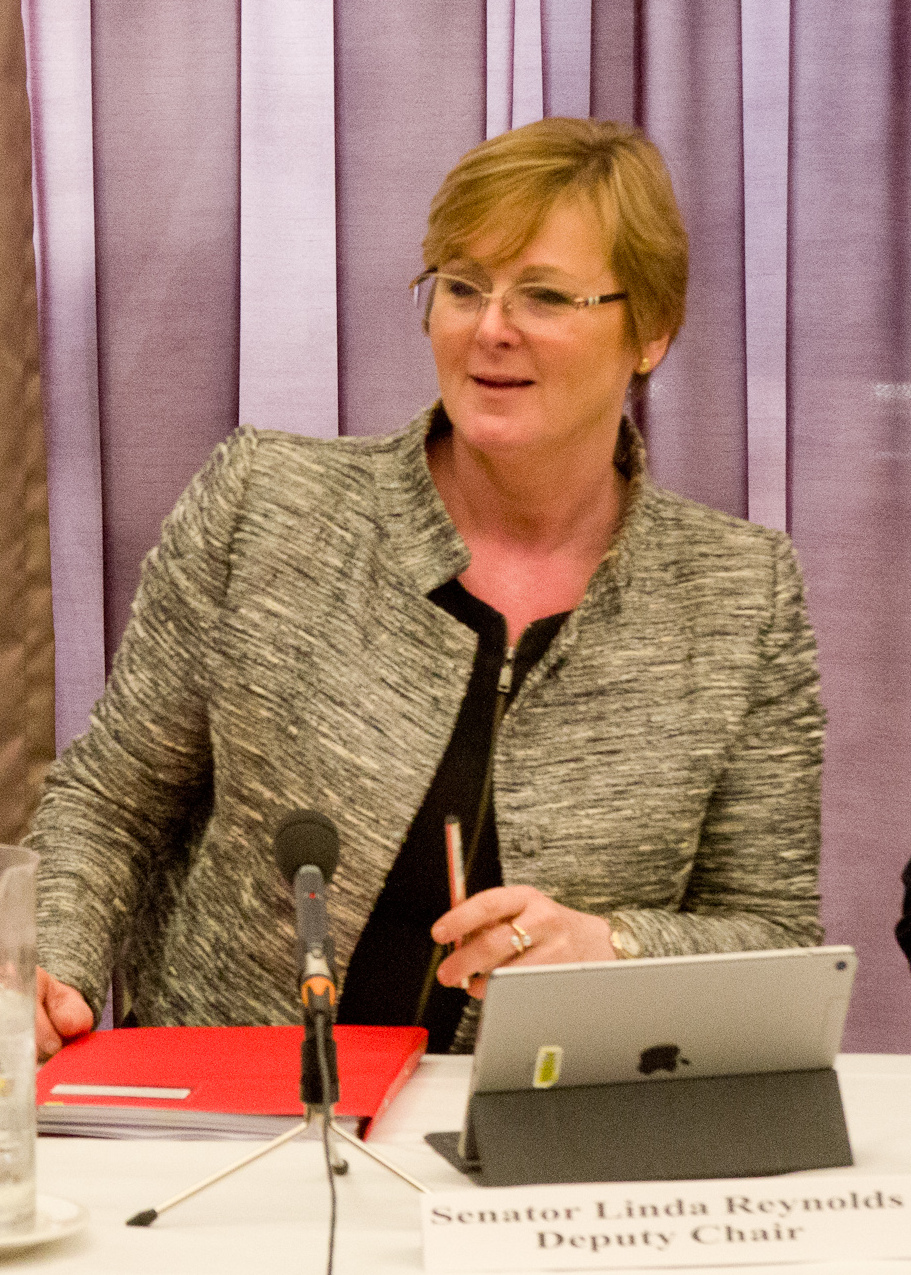
Reynolds at a Senate committee meeting in February 2017

Reynolds joined the Liberal Party in 1987. Prior to her election to parliament, she held various positions in the party's organisational wing. She was a campaign manager for the divisions of Pearce and Hasluck and served as a deputy federal director from 2006 to 2008. She also worked as an electorate officer and ministerial advisor, notably as chief of staff and senior adviser to justice minister Chris Ellison from 2001 to 2003. Prior to 2014, she had mentored political leaders from Thailand, Papua New Guinea, Iraq, Afghanistan and Pakistan.

== Senate (2014–2025) ==
Reynolds was elected to the Senate at the 2013 federal election from third position on the Liberal Party's ticket in Western Australia. However, her position was placed in doubt when the High Court ordered a fresh half-Senate election after determining that there were missing ballot papers. Reynolds was successful in the re-run and her Senate term commenced on 1 July 2014. She was subsequently re-elected to the Senate at the 2016 federal election and the 2019 federal election, leading the Liberal Party's ticket in the latter. She chaired a number of Senate committees prior to her elevation to the ministry in 2018.

Reynolds is a member of the Centrist faction of the Liberal Party, after previously being aligned with the Moderate/Modern Liberal faction during the Morrison government years.

During the 2018 Liberal Party of Australia leadership spills, Reynolds reportedly supported the incumbent prime minister Malcolm Turnbull in the first ballot on 21 August before switching her support to Scott Morrison in the second ballot on 24 August. On 23 August, she told the Senate that she was "distressed and disturbed" by the behaviour of some Liberal MPs during the leadership conflict, which had "no place in my party or this chamber".

=== Government minister ===
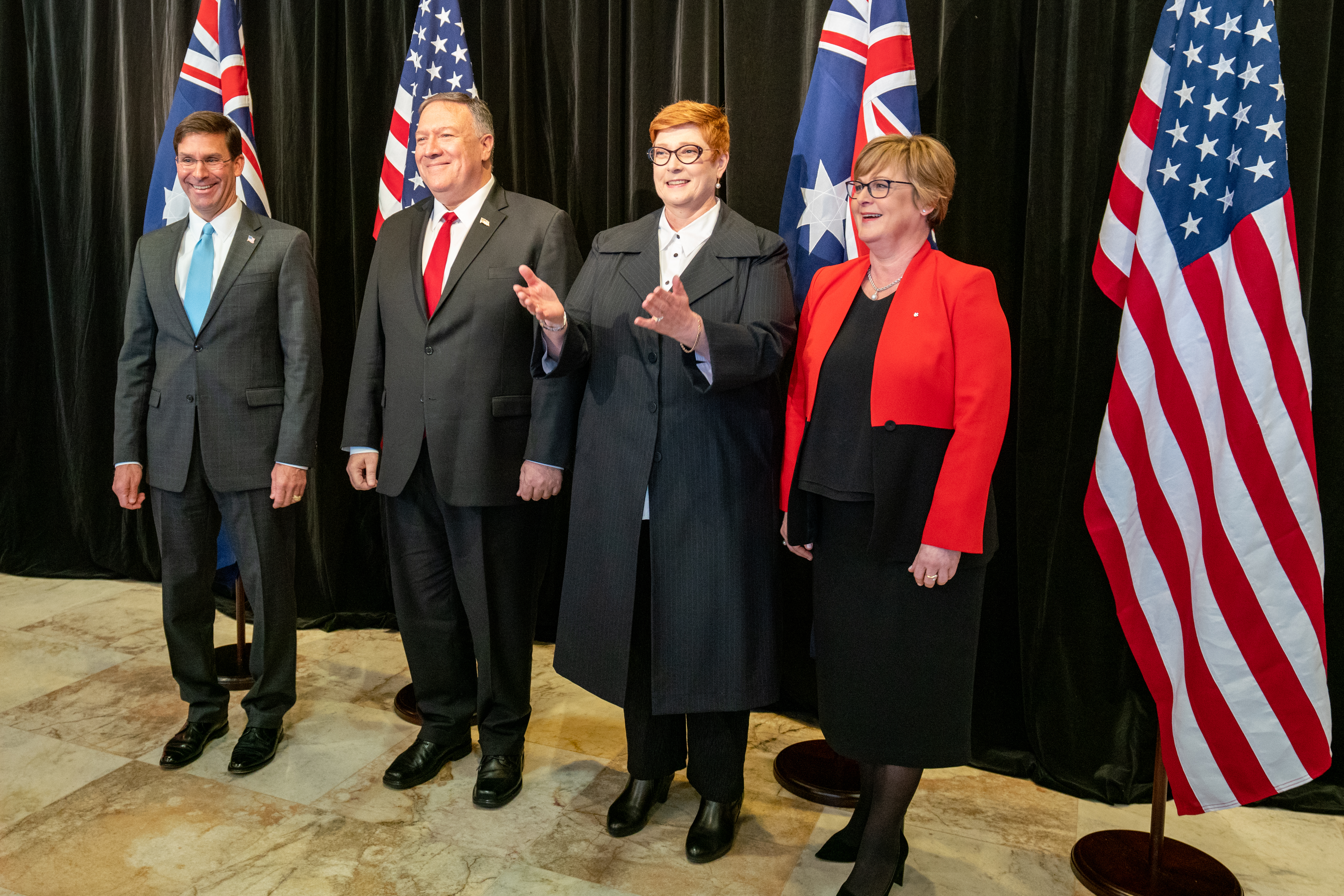
Reynolds in August 2019 with U.S. Defense Secretary Mark Esper, U.S. Secretary of State Mike Pompeo, and Australian foreign minister Marise Payne

In August 2018, Reynolds was appointed Assistant Minister for Home Affairs in the First Morrison Ministry, serving under Peter Dutton. She was elevated to Cabinet in March 2019 as Minister for Defence Industry, as part of a planned transition to the role of Minister for Defence following Christopher Pyne's decision to retire at the 2019 federal election. She was also appointed to the new role of Minister for Emergency Management and North Queensland Recovery, having previously held responsibility for disaster recovery in the Assistant Minister for Home Affairs position. In early 2019, she was a strong opponent of the medevac bill that expanded the medical evacuation of asylum seekers from offshore processing facilities to Australia. In a speech to the Senate, she said that the bill would encourage unauthorised arrivals by boat and that as a result the military would "have to recover the bloated corpses of babies and women mauled by sharks".

Reynolds was appointed Minister for Defence in May 2019, following the Coalition's victory at the 2019 federal election, the second woman to hold the position after Marise Payne. Her appointment was cautiously welcomed by Neil James, the president of the Australian Defence Association, who noted her lack of ministerial experience. In May 2020, Reynolds was accused of misleading the Senate by Mark Sullivan, the chair of the Defence Honours and Awards Appeal Tribunal, over her rejection of a posthumous Victoria Cross for Australia for Teddy Sheean.

In March 2021, Reynolds was demoted to Minister for Government Services and Minister for the National Disability Insurance Scheme.

=== Brittany Higgins rape ===
In February 2021, reports emerged that Brittany Higgins, a junior staffer in Reynolds' office, had allegedly been raped in 2019 by Bruce Lehrmann, an advisor to Reynolds, in her office late at night. Reynolds faced pressure to reveal what she had known about the incident. The advisor was sacked days after the incident for a security breach. Reynolds did not provide a reference but did not say whether his termination payout was withheld. Prime Minister Scott Morrison publicly rebuked Reynolds for not telling him of the incident. Reynolds was due to address the National Press Club on 24 February, but it was announced that day that she had taken indefinite medical leave related to a pre-existing condition. Her medical leave was extended on 7 March for another four weeks to 2 April.

In March 2021, it was reported that Reynolds had called Higgins a "lying cow" in the presence of her own staff at Parliament House Canberra. Lawyers representing Higgins demanded a public apology. Reynolds issued an apology for the comment, saying the comments were not over the rape allegation. As part of a confidential settlement she also agreed to pay Higgins' legal costs and donate money to a sexual assault charity.

In December 2022, the case was dropped by the Director of Public Prosecutions stating it was "no longer in the public interest to pursue a prosecution at the risk of [Higgins'] life". The accused "consistently maintained his innocence and the case against him was not proven".

In July 2023, Reynolds announced that she would ask the National Anti-Corruption Commission to investigate the circumstances surrounding a Commonwealth personal injury compensation payment to Higgins, as well as the "speed and fairness of the Labor government’s handling of the case".

On 15 April 2024, Justice Michael Lee of the Federal Court ruled that on the balance of probabilities Lehrmann raped Brittany Higgins at Parliament House in 2019.

==== Defamation actions ====
In January 2023, Reynolds stated she would be suing Higgins' partner David Sharaz for defamation. In April 2023 Reynolds reached a settlement with the journalist Aaron Patrick and his publisher HarperCollins after initiating legal action over claims made by Patrick regarding her handling of Higgins' rape allegation in a book. The terms of the settlement are confidential, but the book was allowed to remain on sale.

Higgins announced she would be considering her legal options after having been issued a notice of concerns from Reynolds defamation lawyer Martin Bennett in July 2023, relating to one of Higgins' Instagram stories. Higgins released a statement in which she accused the former minister of targeting her with continued harassment. "My former boss who has publicly apologised for mishandling my rape allegation. Who has had to publicly apologise to me after defaming me in the workplace. Who is suing my fiance for a tweet." In December 2023, solicitors acting on Reynolds' behalf applied for an urgent order to have Higgins' assets frozen before the Christmas recess period. This came following Higgins' decision to move to France.

In March 2024, it was reported that the ACT Government had paid compensation and apologised to Reynolds in respect of comments by Shane Drumgold, the prosecutor in the Higgins case. Drumgold had accused Reynolds of engaging in "disturbing conduct" and interfering in the police investigation. It was reported that the settlement was announced on the same day that Acting Justice Kaye of the ACT Supreme Court found the underpinning finding in the Sofronoff report was both the product of apprehended bias and was also unreasonable, and that Drumgold was not consulted in relation to the defamation settlement.

In 2025, Reynolds partially won a defamation case that she had brought against Higgins in the WA Supreme Court, even though it would result in the bankruptcy of Higgins.

=== Opposition ===
Reynolds was not appointed to any shadow ministries following the Coalition's defeat in the 2022 federal election. In August 2022 she was appointed chair of the Senate Standing Committee on Senators' Interests and deputy chair of the Joint Committee of Public Accounts and Audit. She was also appointed to represent Australia on the Interparliamentary Taskforce on Human Trafficking and subsequently became leader of the taskforce's Working Group on Orphanage Trafficking. In August 2024, following reporting around misconduct in historical adoption of South Korean children, she stated that the Australian government should suspend all intercountry adoptions pending a parliamentary inquiry into the "need and ethics" of the practice.

In February 2024, Reynolds announced she would not recontest her seat at the next federal election, with her term expiring on 30 June 2025.

Political offices
| Preceded by Stuart Robert | Minister for Government Services; 2021–2022 | Succeeded by Bill Shorten |
| Preceded by Christopher Pyne | Minister for Defence; 2019–2021 | Succeeded by Peter Dutton |
| Preceded by Steven Ciobo | Minister for Defence Industry; 2019–2019 | Succeeded by Melissa Price |
| New title | Minister for Emergency Management and North Queensland Recovery; 2019–2019 | Succeeded by David Littleproud as Minister for Water Resources, Drought, Rural Finance, Natural Disaster and Emergency Management |
| Preceded by Alex Hawke | Assistant Minister for Home Affairs; 2018–2019 | Succeeded by Jason Wood |
