= Chronology of Australian federal parliaments =

The term of Australian parliaments is determined by the opening and dissolution (or expiration) of the House of Representatives. The Senate is not normally dissolved at all, except at a double dissolution, when the entire parliament is dissolved.

Parliaments do not have a fixed term. The maximum term permitted by section 28 of the Constitution of Australia is three years, counted from the date the parliament first meets after a general election. However, the Governor-General, acting on the advice of the Prime Minister, may dissolve the parliament earlier. This has happened in all but one case (the 3rd Parliament 1907–1910). However, the 18th Parliament (1946–49) was only five days short of the full three years, and eight parliaments have exceeded 2 years, 300 days. The average length of completed parliaments since Federation has been about 2 years, 130 days.

Because there is only an indirect relationship between the dates of elections and the commencement and dissolution dates of parliaments, more than three years can elapse between consecutive elections. This has happened on a number of occasions, most recently between the 2019 and 2022 elections (3 years 3 days). The longest gap between elections was 3 years 122 days, between the 1906 and 1910 elections.

Parliaments may be divided into one or more sessions. Each session except the last must be prorogued before a new session can begin. One of the effects of prorogation is that it prevents the Senate from meeting and conducting its business after the House of Representatives has concluded its business.

Between 1928 and 1989, the last or sole session of a parliament was not prorogued, as the parliament was dissolved. Since 1993, the session has been prorogued prior to dissolution.

== Chronology ==
| Number and Session | Date of general election (time since last election) | Date of opening | Last sitting day of the House of Representatives | Date of prorogation | Date of dissolution (or expiration) | Length of Parliament |
|---|---|---|---|---|---|---|
| 1st Parliament | 29 & 30 March 1901 | | | | | |
| First Session | | 9 May 1901 | 10 October 1902 | 10 October 1902 | | |
| Second Session | | 26 May 1903 | 22 October 1903 | 22 October 1903 | 23 November 1903 | 2 years 199 days |
| 2nd Parliament | 16 December 1903 (2 years 261 days) | | | | | |
| First Session | | 2 March 1904 | 15 December 1904 | 15 December 1904 | | |
| Second Session | | 28 June 1905 | 21 December 1905 | 21 December 1905 | | |
| Third Session | | 7 June 1906 | 12 October 1906 | 12 October 1906 | 5 November 1906 | 2 years 249 days |
| 3rd Parliament | 12 December 1906 (2 years 361 days) | | | | | |
| First Session | | 20 February 1907 | 21 February 1907 | 22 February 1907 | | |
| Second Session | | 3 July 1907 | 5 June 1908 | 11 June 1908 | | |
| Third Session | | 16 September 1908 | 11 December 1908 | 15 December 1908 | | |
| Fourth Session | | 26 May 1909 | 8 December 1909 | 13 December 1909 | 19 February 1910 (expired) | 3 years |
| 4th Parliament | 13 April 1910 (3 years 122 days) | | | | | |
| First Session | | 1 July 1910 | 25 November 1910 | 29 November 1910 | | |
| Second Session | | 5 September 1911 | 19–21 December 1911 | 22 December 1911 | | |
| Third Session | | 19 June 1912 | 20–21 December 1912 | 8 January 1913 | 23 April 1913 | 2 years 297 days |
| 5th Parliament | 31 May 1913 (3 years 48 days) | | | | | |
| First Session | | 9 July 1913 | 18–19 December 1913 | 19 December 1913 | | |
| Second Session | | 15 April 1914 | 26 June 1914 | 27 June 1914 | 30 July 1914 | 1 year 22 days |
| 6th Parliament | 5 September 1914 (1 year 97 days) | | | | | |
| First Session | | 8 October 1914 | 16–17 March 1917 | 20 March 1917 | 26 March 1917 | 2 years 203 days |
| 7th Parliament | 5 May 1917 (2 years 242 days) | | | | | |
| First Session | | 14 June 1917 | 14 June 1917 | 16 June 1917 | | |
| Second Session | | 11 July 1917 | 24 October 1919 | 28 October 1919 | 3 November 1919 | 2 years 143 days |
| 8th Parliament | 13 December 1919 (2 years 222 days) | | | | | |
| First Session | | 26 February 1920 | 9–10 December 1921 | 5 January 1922 | | |
| Second Session | | 28 June 1922 | 12–14 October 1922 | 18 October 1922 | 6 November 1922 | 2 years 254 days |
| 9th Parliament | 16 December 1922 (3 years 3 days) | | | | | |
| First Session | | 28 February 1923 | 9 March 1923 | 21 March 1923 | | |
| Second Session | | 13 June 1923 | 9–10 October 1924 | 30 April 1925 | | |
| Third Session | | 10 June 1925 | 23–25 September 1925 | 28 September 1925 | 3 October 1925 | 2 years 218 days |
| 10th Parliament | 14 November 1925 (2 years 333 days) | | | | | |
| First Session | | 13 January 1926 | 21–22 September 1928 | not prorogued | 9 October 1928 | 2 years 271 days |
| 11th Parliament | 17 November 1928 (3 years 3 days) | | | | | |
| First Session | | 6 February 1929 | 12 September 1929 | not prorogued | 16 September 1929 | 0 years 223 days |
| 12th Parliament | 12 October 1929 (0 years 329 days) | | | | | |
| First Session | | 20 November 1929 | 26 November 1931 | not prorogued | 27 November 1931 | 2 years 8 days |
| 13th Parliament | 19 December 1931 (2 years 68 days) | | | | | |
| First Session | | 17 February 1932 | 1–2 August 1934 | not prorogued | 7 August 1934 | 2 years 172 days |
| 14th Parliament | 15 September 1934 (2 years 270 days) | | | | | |
| First Session | | 23 October 1934 | 11 December 1936 | 27 May 1937 | | |
| Second Session | | 17 June 1937 | 15 September 1937 | not prorogued | 21 September 1937 | 2 years 334 days |
| 15th Parliament | 23 October 1937 (3 years 38 days) | | | | | |
| First Session | | 30 November 1937 | 7–8 December 1939 | 14 March 1940 | | |
| Second Session | | 17 April 1940 | 21–22 August 1940 | not prorogued | 27 August 1940 | 2 years 272 days |
| 16th Parliament | 21 September 1940 (2 years 333 days) | | | | | |
| First Session | | 20 November 1940 | 1 July 1943 | not prorogued | 7 July 1943 | 2 years 230 days |
| 17th Parliament | 21 August 1943 (2 years 334 days) | | | | | |
| First Session | | 23 September 1943 | 30–31 March 1944 | 5 July 1944 | | |
| Second Session | | 17 July 1944 | 1 December 1944 | 8 February 1945 | | |
| Third Session | | 21 February 1945 | 9 August 1946 | not prorogued | 16 August 1946 | 2 years 328 days |
| 18th Parliament | 28 September 1946 (3 years 38 days) | | | | | |
| First Session | | 6 November 1946 | 17–18 June 1948 | 4 August 1948 | | |
| Second Session | | 1 September 1948 | 27 October 1949 | not prorogued | 31 October 1949 | 2 years 360 days |
| 19th Parliament | 10 December 1949 (3 years 73 days) | | | | | |
| First Session | | 22 February 1950 | 16 March 1951 | not prorogued | 19 March 1951 | 1 year 26 days |
| 20th Parliament | 28 April 1951 (1 year 139 days) | | | | | |
| First Session | | 12 June 1951 | 22 October 1953 | 30 October 1953 | | |
| Second Session | | 10 November 1953 | 2–3 December 1953 | 4 February 1954 | | |
| Third Session | | 15 February 1954 | 14 April 1954 | not prorogued | 21 April 1954 | 2 years 314 days |
| 21st Parliament | 29 May 1954 (3 years 31 days) | | | | | |
| First Session | | 4 August 1954 | 27–28 October 1955 | not prorogued | 4 November 1955 | 1 year 93 days |
| 22nd Parliament | 10 December 1955 (1 year 195 days) | | | | | |
| First Session | | 15 February 1956 | 8 November 1956 | 7 March 1957 | | |
| Second Session | | 19 March 1957 | 5 December 1957 | 11 February 1958 | | |
| Third Session | | 25 February 1958 | 1–2 October 1958 | not prorogued | 14 October 1958 | 2 years 242 days |
| 23rd Parliament | 22 November 1958 (2 years 347 days) | | | | | |
| First Session | | 17 February 1959 | 3 December 1959 | 10 February 1960 | | |
| Second Session | | 8 March 1960 | 8–9 December 1960 | 20 February 1961 | | |
| Third Session | | 7 March 1961 | 26–27 October 1961 | not prorogued | 2 November 1961 | 2 years 259 days |
| 24th Parliament | 9 December 1961 (3 years 17 days) | | | | | |
| First Session | | 20 February 1962 | 30 October 1963 | not prorogued | 1 November 1963 | 1 year 255 days |
| 25th Parliament | 30 November 1963 (1 year 356 days) | | | | | |
| First Session | | 25 February 1964 | 28 October 1966 | not prorogued | 31 October 1966 | 2 years 249 days |
| 26th Parliament | 26 November 1966 (2 years 361 days) | | | | | |
| First Session | | 21 February 1967 | 8–9 November 1967 | 9 February 1968 | | |
| Second Session | | 12 March 1968 | 26 September 1969 | not prorogued | 29 September 1969 | 2 years 221 days |
| 27th Parliament | 25 October 1969 (2 years 334 days) | | | | | |
| First Session | | 25 November 1969 | 25–26 November 1969 | 23 February 1970 | | |
| Second Session | | 3 March 1970 | 26 October 1972 | not prorogued | 2 November 1972 | 2 years 344 days |
| 28th Parliament | 2 December 1972 (3 years 38 days) | | | | | |
| First Session | | 27 February 1973 | 13 December 1973 | 14 February 1974 | | |
| Second Session | | 28 February 1974 | 10 April 1974 | not prorogued | 11 April 1974 | 1 year 44 days |
| 29th Parliament | 18 May 1974 (1 year 167 days) | | | | | |
| First Session | | 9 July 1974 | 11 November 1975 | not prorogued | 11 November 1975 | 1 year 126 days |
| 30th Parliament | 13 December 1975 (1 year 209 days) | | | | | |
| First Session | | 17 February 1976 | 24 February 1977 | 28 February 1977 | | |
| Second Session | | 8 March 1977 | 8 November 1977 | not prorogued | 10 November 1977 | 1 year 267 days |
| 31st Parliament | 10 December 1977 (1 year 362 days) | | | | | |
| First Session | | 21 February 1978 | 18 September 1980 | not prorogued | 19 September 1980 | 2 years 212 days |
| 32nd Parliament | 18 October 1980 (2 years 312 days) | | | | | |
| First Session | | 25 November 1980 | 14–15 December 1982 | not prorogued | 4 February 1983 | 2 years 72 days |
| 33rd Parliament | 5 March 1983 (2 years 138 days) | | | | | |
| First Session | | 21 April 1983 | 11 October 1984 | not prorogued | 26 October 1984 | 1 year 189 days |
| 34th Parliament | 1 December 1984 (1 year 271 days) | | | | | |
| First Session | | 21 February 1985 | 4 June 1987 | not prorogued | 5 June 1987 | 2 years 105 days |
| 35th Parliament | 11 July 1987 (2 years 222 days) | | | | | |
| First Session | | 14 September 1987 | 22 December 1989 | not prorogued | 19 February 1990 | 2 years 159 days |
| 36th Parliament | 24 March 1990 (2 years 256 days) | | | | | |
| First Session | | 8 May 1990 | 17–18 December 1992 | 8 February 1993 | 8 February 1993 | 2 years 277 days |
| 37th Parliament | 13 March 1993 (2 years 356 days) | | | | | |
| First Session | | 4 May 1993 | 30 November- 1 December 1995 | 29 January 1996 | 29 January 1996 | 2 years 271 days |
| 38th Parliament | 2 March 1996 (2 years 356 days) | | | | | |
| First Session | | 30 April 1996 | 15 July 1998 | 31 August 1998 | 31 August 1998 | 2 years 124 days |
| 39th Parliament | 3 October 1998 (2 years 215 days) | | | | | |
| First Session | | 10 November 1998 | 27 September 2001 | 8 October 2001 | 8 October 2001 | 2 years 333 days |
| 40th Parliament | 10 November 2001 (3 years 38 days) | | | | | |
| First Session | | 12 February 2002 | 12–13 August 2004 | 31 August 2004 | 31 August 2004 | 2 years 202 days |
| 41st Parliament | 9 October 2004 (2 years 333 days) | | | | | |
| First Session | | 16 November 2004 | 20 September 2007 | 15 October 2007 | 17 October 2007 | 2 years 336 days |
| 42nd Parliament | 24 November 2007 (3 years 46 days) | | | | | |
| First Session | | 12 February 2008 | 24 June 2010 | 19 July 2010 | 19 July 2010 | 2 years 158 days |
| 43rd Parliament | 21 August 2010 (2 years 270 days) | | | | | |
| First Session | | 28 September 2010 | 27 June 2013 | 5 August 2013 | 5 August 2013 | 2 years 312 days |
| 44th Parliament | 7 September 2013 (3 years 17 days) | | | | | |
| First Session | | 12 November 2013 | 18 March 2016 | 15 April 2016 | | |
| Second Session | | 18 April 2016 | 5 May 2016 | 9 May 2016 | 9 May 2016 | 2 years 180 days |
| 45th Parliament | 2 July 2016 (2 years 300 days) | | | | | |
| First Session | | 30 August 2016 | 4 April 2019 | 11 April 2019 | 11 April 2019 | 2 years 225 days |
| 46th Parliament | 19 May 2019 (2 years 322 days) | | | | | |
| First Session | | 2 July 2019 | 31 March 2022 | 11 April 2022 | 11 April 2022 | 2 years 284 days |
| 47th Parliament | 21 May 2022 (3 years 3 days) | | | | | |
| First Session | | 26 July 2022 | 27 March 2025 | 28 March 2025 | 28 March 2025 | 2 years 246 days |
| 48th Parliament | 3 May 2025 (2 years 348 days) | | | | | |

== Last Parliament ==
| Parliament | Date of opening | First Session | Date of dissolution (or expiration) |
|---|---|---|---|
| 47th Parliament | 26 July 2022 | 26 July 2022 | 28 March 2025 |

== Current Parliament ==
| Parliament | Date of opening | First Session | Date of dissolution (or expiration) |
|---|---|---|---|
| 48th Parliament | 22 July 2025 | 22 July 2025 | TBD |

== See also ==
- List of Australian federal elections

== Sources ==
- House of Representatives Practice, Appendix 15: Chronology of Parliaments
