= Warwick Stacey =

Australian politician (born 1952)

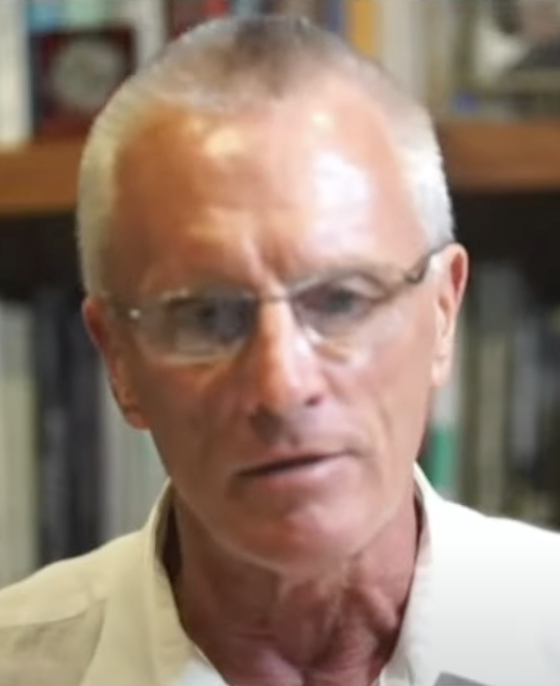

Senator for New South Wales
- In office 1 July 2025 – 19 August 2025
- Succeeded by: Sean Bell

Personal details
- Born: 19 November 1952 (age 74)
- Party: One Nation
- Other political affiliations: Seniors United (2017)
- Education: King's College London (MA)

Warwick Desmond Stacey (born 19 November 1952) is an Australian politician and former army officer. He was elected to the Senate at the 2025 federal election as One Nation's lead Senate candidate in New South Wales, to a six-year term beginning on 1 July 2025. Stacey resigned on 19 August 2025 due to personal health issues.

== Early life ==
Stacey was born on 19 November 1952, the twin son of Noel Stacey. He was raised in Australia, where he attended Sydney Grammar School. He moved to France at the age of 21 and later lived in the United Kingdom.

== Career ==
After attending the Royal Military Academy Sandhurst, Stacey served with the British Army as an officer in the Parachute Regiment and troop commander in the 22 SAS Regiment. He later spent 10 years in the Australian Army Reserve.

After leaving the military he worked as a "contract officer on military projects in the Middle East and the Indian sub-continent" and later became a crisis and risk management focusing on "incidents of kidnap for ransom, extortion, maritime piracy, product extortion and contamination, and related life-threatening crises". He worked for Control Risks Group, Pinkerton, Aegis Defence Services and Steve Vickers Associates.

== Politics ==
Stacey has written for Spectator Australia and has been described by David Flint as "long prominent in the defence of our constitutional monarchy".

Stacey was a candidate in the 2017 New England by-election for the Seniors United Party of Australia. He came 16th place with 0.39% of the vote.

At the 2025 federal election, Stacey was the lead Senate candidate for One Nation in New South Wales and was elected for a six-year term, beginning on 1 July 2025.

Stacey resigned from the Senate on 19 August 2025, having only attended Parliament for two sitting weeks. He said his resignation was due to personal health problems, which would prevent him from dedicating himself to the role of a senator. His resignation made him the fourth-shortest-serving member of the Parliament of Australia, and the shortest-serving MP or senator in the 21st century.

In September 2025, One Nation announced that it would appoint Sean Bell, a former political advisor to Pauline Hanson, as Stacey's successor.

== Personal life ==
Stacey holds a Master of Arts in European literature from King's College London. He speaks German and holds a simultaneous interpretation accreditation.
