= Richard Dowling (Australian politician) =

Australian politician (born 1983)

Senator Richard Dowling

Senator for Tasmania
- Incumbent
- Assumed office 1 July 2025
- Preceded by: Catryna Bilyk

Personal details
- Born: 18 September 1983 (age 42) Fitzroy, Victoria, Australia
- Party: Labor
- Website: www.alp.org.au/our-people/our-people/richard-dowling/

Richard Dowling (born 18 September 1983) is an Australian economist and politician, who is currently serving as a Labor Senator for Tasmania since 1 July 2025. Before entering the Senate, he worked across economics, government, and global technology firms, and was active in the Australian Workers' Union.

== Early life and education ==
Dowling was born on 18 September 1983 in Fitzroy, Victoria and raised in Hobart Tasmania. His parents worked in the seafood industry, government services, and briefly ran a bookshop.

He attended Tasmanian public schools and later studied Economics at the University of Tasmania, combining his studies with a cadetship at the Tasmanian Department of Treasury and Finance. He subsequently earned an MBA from the University of Warwick, focusing his dissertation on clean energy innovation.

== Career as an economist ==
Dowling worked at KFC while studying, before joining the Tasmanian Treasury as a policy analyst. Reflecting on this time, he joked that he moved "from the fryer to fiscal policy" and learned that "responsible economic management is the foundation of any good government."

In his early twenties, he became Chief Economist at the Tasmanian Chamber of Commerce and Industry (TCCI). Known for frequent media commentary, he has said that while his views sometimes divided opinion, the role taught him how to explain economic issues in plain terms.

Dowling retained his Labor Party membership and engaged closely with the Australian Workers' Union (AWU). He described nights spent debating policy in the union boardroom, noting that while business and unions came from different angles, they "cared about the same thing — dignity at work and a decent future for working people."

In 2010, he was appointed Senior Economic Adviser to Tasmanian Premier Lara Giddings. He has said this role taught him that "behind every budget line is a life, a story, a community."

Dowling later worked internationally at the intersection of economics and innovation, including roles in healthcare (Baxter Healthcare), clean energy (Faraday Grid), and technology. He served as Head of Asia Pacific, Government Relations & Public Policy at VMware until early 2024, before briefly joining Meta Platforms as Director of Public Policy.

== Political career ==
In November 2024, Dowling was preselected on Labor's Tasmanian Senate ticket, replacing retiring Senator Catryna Bilyk. He was elected at the 2025 Australian federal election and commenced his term on 1 July 2025. In his maiden speech, he set out three themes: economic empowerment, intergenerational fairness, and secure jobs. He emphasised that "a fair economy doesn't just give people a safety net; it gives them the tools to build a future."

== Personal life ==
Dowling lives in Hobart with his wife, Georgia, whom he met while working in the Parliament of Tasmania. He credits his parents, Judy and David, for instilling values of fairness, community, and resilience.
