= Corinne Mulholland =

Australian politician

Senator Corinne Mulholland

Senator for Queensland
- Incumbent
- Assumed office 1 July 2025
- Preceded by: Gerard Rennick

Personal details
- Born: 22 October 1987 (age 39) Ipswich, Queensland, Australia
- Party: Labor
- Other political affiliations: Labor Right
- Website: www.alp.org.au/our-people/our-people/corinne-mulholland/

Corinne Mulholland (born 22 October 1987) is an Australian politician from the Australian Labor Party. She was elected in the 2025 federal election and began her six-year term as Senator for Queensland on 1 July 2025. She was the second candidate on the party list behind Nita Green.

Mulholland is a senior executive with 15 years' experience in local and state government. She worked as a lobbyist for Star Casino. She was the unsuccessful Labor candidate in the Division of Petrie in the 2019 Australian federal election. She is associated with the Labor Right faction.
