= Sean Bell (politician) =

Australian politician (born 1987)

Senator Sean Bell

Senator for New South Wales
- Incumbent
- Assumed office 18 September 2025
- Preceded by: Warwick Stacey

Party Whip of Pauline Hanson's One Nation in the Senate
- Incumbent
- Assumed office 27 October 2025
- Leader: Pauline Hanson
- Preceded by: Pauline Hanson

Personal details
- Born: 1 August 1987 (age 39) Bundaberg, Queensland, Australia
- Party: One Nation
- Occupation: Political advisor and politician

Sean Fredrick Bell (born 1 August 1987) is an Australian politician who sits in the Senate as a member of Pauline Hanson's One Nation, representing the state of New South Wales. He was appointed to the Senate on 18 September 2025, following his nomination by Pauline Hanson’s One Nation to fill a casual vacancy, which was confirmed at a joint sitting of the New South Wales parliament. Bell succeeded fellow One Nation senator Warwick Stacey, who resigned from the Senate on 19 August 2025 citing ill health.

== Early life ==
Prior to entering politics, Bell worked in retail, hospitality and warehousing before studying journalism at Griffith University and also attaining a Certificate III in Investigative Services.

== Political career ==
Bell has been affiliated with One Nation and party leader Pauline Hanson for many years, having spent nine years prior to his appointment as a staffer and senior advisor to Hanson.

Bell has cited "ending mass migration" and abolishing net-zero as his main political priorities.

At the time of his appointment to the Senate, Bell was listed on the electoral roll as a Queensland resident. During the joint sitting to confirm his appointment, Bell's status was questioned by former One Nation state leader Mark Latham, who attempted to block the nomination on the basis of what he described as an implied right to equal representation of the states under the Australian Constitution. Although the Constitution does not preclude a Senate candidate from living in another state or territory from the one they represent, such cases are rare. Latham's attempt was blocked by the chamber by 100 votes to 3. A party spokesperson later confirmed that Bell would move from Queensland to New South Wales.

He became One Nation's Senate Whip on 27 October that year.
