= Tyron Whitten =

Australian politician

Senator Tyron Whitten
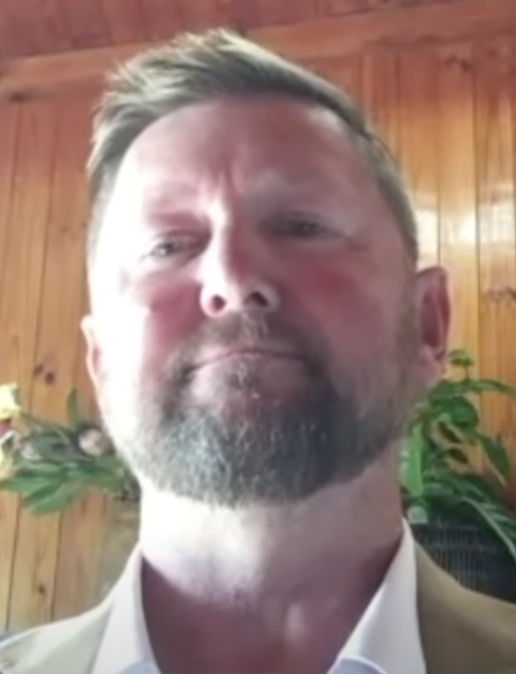

Senator for Western Australia
- Incumbent
- Assumed office 1 July 2025
- Preceded by: Linda Reynolds

Personal details
- Party: One Nation

Tyron Whitten is an Australian politician who is a Senator for Western Australia, having been elected at the 2025 federal election for Pauline Hanson's One Nation. His six year-term began on 1 July 2025.

In 2001, Whitten and his brother Clayton established Whittens, a privately owned earthworks and construction business operating in the resources, defence, and infrastructure segments. Whittens was engaged to work on the Snowy Mountains hydro project.
