= Tammy Tyrrell =

Australian politician (born 1970)

Senator Tammy Tyrrell
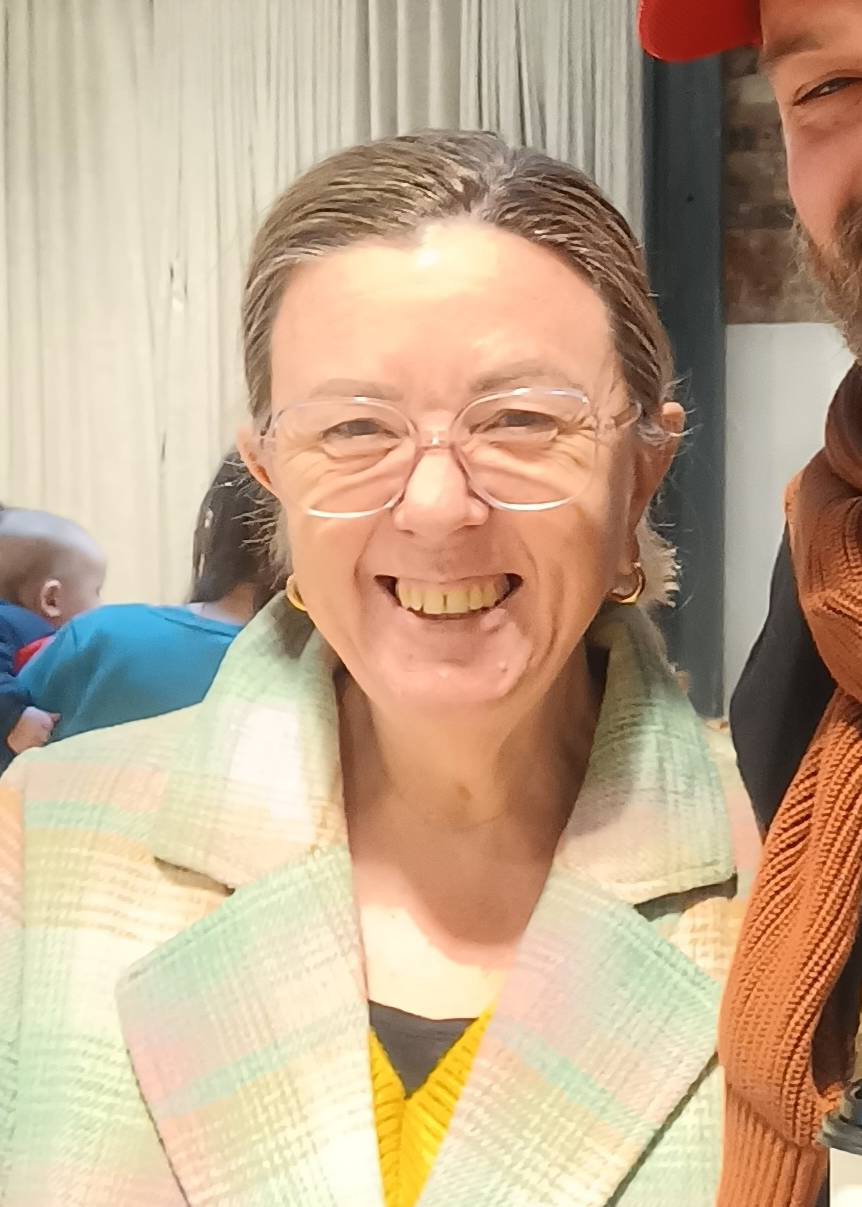
- Tyrrell in 2024

Senator for Tasmania
- Incumbent
- Assumed office 1 July 2022
- Preceded by: Eric Abetz

Personal details
- Born: 1 August 1970 (age 56) Ulverstone, Tasmania, Australia
- Party: Labor (since 2026)
- Other political affiliations: Jacqui Lambie Network (until 2024); Independent (2024–2026)

Tammy Tyrrell (born 1 August 1970) is an Australian politician who has served as a senator for Tasmania since 2022. Initially a member of the Jacqui Lambie Network, she became an independent politician in 2024 and joined the Labor Party in 2026.

== Early life ==
Tyrrell was born on 1 August 1970 in Ulverstone, Tasmania. She was employed in a number of roles prior to her political career, including working at a petrol station, as a farmhand and employment training adviser for a job agency.

== Political career ==
From 2014 to 2022, Tyrrell worked as a political staff member for Tasmanian Senator, Jacqui Lambie. In the 2022 federal election, Tyrrell was selected as lead candidate on the Jacqui Lambie Network (JLN) Senate ticket, later winning a seat by defeating incumbent Liberal senator, Eric Abetz.

On 28 March 2024, Tyrrell announced her resignation from the JLN to sit as an independent, citing that Senator Lambie was "not happy" with the way Tyrrell had represented the party.

Early in her term as independent senator, Tyrrell helped retain the Australian Wine Tourism and Cellar Door Grants program in support of local winemakers, called for a review of Tasmanian aged care facilities, advocated for the construction of more affordable homes in Tasmania, and spoke out against a decision by the Morrison government to award an $18 million dollar grant which was personally backed by former Australian Governor-General, David Hurley.

On 14 May, 2026, at a press conference held by Tyrrell and prime minister Anthony Albanese, Tyrrell announced that she would join the Labor Party.

=== Childcare ===
Tyrrell has been a vocal supporter of early childhood education and care. Between July and August 2024, she campaigned the Senate to keep small, independent day care facilities in business, and called on both federal and state governments to iron-out regulatory loopholes in the industry.

=== Freight costs ===
On 21 August 2024, Tyrrell was made chair of the Australian Senate committee enquiry into the effectiveness of the Tasmanian Freight Equalisation Scheme.

=== Supermarket pricing ===
In December 2023, Tyrrell was appointed to the Senate Select Committee on Supermarket Prices which investigated price gouging practices by large supermarket chains. Tyrrell highlighted the lack of market competition in Tasmania and called for incentives to bring smaller retailers, such as Aldi, to the island.

=== Cannabis ===
The Legalising Cannabis Bill 2023 – introduced to Senate by the Greens in 2023 to legalise adult use of cannabis at a federal level – was put to a vote in November 2024. Tyrrell joined all Greens senators, and fellow independent senator, Lidia Thorpe, to vote in favour of the bill, which was ultimately defeated with 13 votes to 24.

== Tammy Tyrrell for Tasmania ==
Tammy Tyrrell for Tasmania
- Abbreviation: TT; TT4T
- Registered Officer: Tyler Tyrrell
- Founder: Tammy Tyrrell
- Founded: 24 September 2024
- Registered: 12 December 2024
- Split from: Jacqui Lambie Network
- Merged into: Labor
- Ideology: Tasmanian regionalism
- Colours: Dark violet
- Senate: 0 / 12 (Tasmania seats)

Website
- tammytyrrell.com

On 24 September 2024, Tyrrell submitted an application to register a political party named "Tammy Tyrrell for Tasmania". Under the Australian Senate electoral system, only registered political parties can have a name and logo appear above the line on the ballot paper. Without it, it is generally understood to be unlikely to win a Senate seat.

The party was successfully registered on 12 December 2024.

With Tyrrell joining the Labor Party in May 2026, Tammy Tyrrell for Tasmania lost its only representation in Australian politics.
