= Charlotte Walker (politician) =

Australian politician (born 2004)

Senator Charlotte Walker
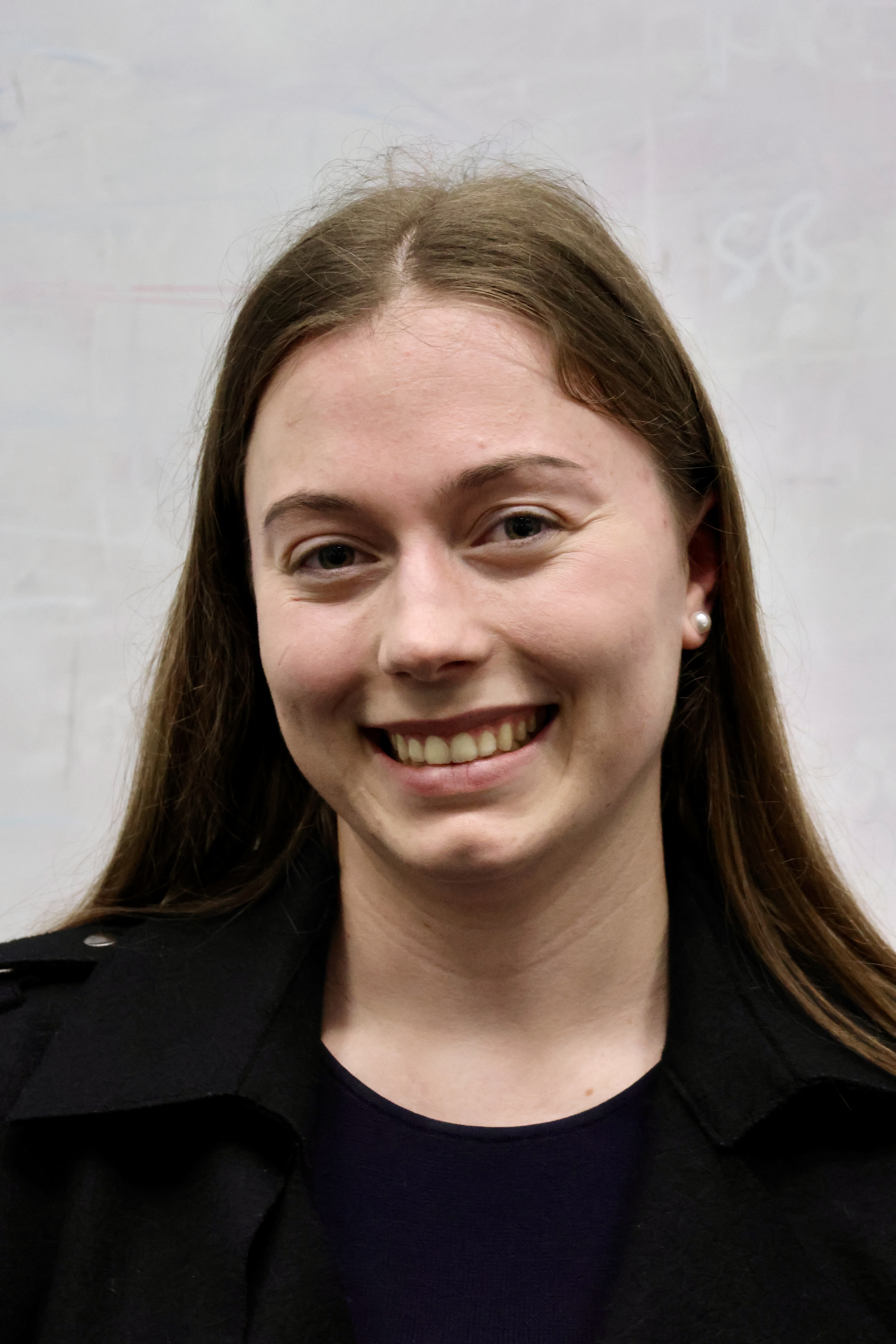
- Walker in 2025

Senator for South Australia
- Incumbent
- Assumed office 1 July 2025
- Preceded by: David Fawcett

Personal details
- Born: 3 May 2004 (age 22) Adelaide, South Australia, Australia
- Party: Labor
- Education: Investigator College

Charlotte Walker (born 3 May 2004) is an Australian politician who was elected as a Senator for South Australia at the 2025 federal election, representing the Australian Labor Party. As of 2025, she is the youngest senator in Australian history, and the youngest current member of the Australian Parliament, having turned 21 on the day of the election. Her six-year term began on 1 July 2025.

== Early life and education ==
Walker was born on 3 May 2004 and grew up in Yankalilla, South Australia.

She was raised for the second half of her teenage years in a single-parent household. Walker attended Investigator College in Victor Harbor.

== Career ==
Walker got her first job at the age of 14, working in a supermarket. After finishing high school, she left that job, and was recruited by House of Assembly speaker Leon Bignell to work part time in his local electorate office. She lives in Adelaide.

Walker, the president of Young Labor in South Australia, was working for the Australian Services Union prior to the election. She was preselected for the usually unwinnable third spot on Labor's SA Senate ticket, but was elected due to a large swing towards the party. She is affiliated with the Labor Left faction.

In the lead up to the election, Walker had posted videos on Instagram "talking up Labor policy while applying makeup, streaming the video game Minecraft and interviewing other young Labor members on the street". She focused on issues such access to education, reducing students' HECS debts, and the cost of living. She also campaigned alongside other South Australian Labor candidates, including Louise Miller-Frost, Penny Wong, and Marielle Smith.

Walker won a seat in the Senate, making her the youngest senator in Australian history, having turned 21 on the day of the election. The previous youngest Senator was Jordon Steele-John from the Greens in Western Australia, who was elected in 2017 at the age of 23.

She gave her maiden speech on 26 August 2025, in which she spoke about her own personal experience of bullying and depression, leading to her interest in addressing mental health of young people as a nation. She also spoke about the algal bloom affecting South Australia, her wish to bring more discussion about domestic violence into the parliament, and about the housing crisis in Australia, that has particularly affected young people.

== Personal life ==
Walker has suffered from depression and has had suicidal ideation, for which she received psychotherapy.

Walker stated in December 2025 that she was caught in a catfishing attempt when a student at her school solicited nude photos. She cites this as a reason for supporting the social media ban for under 16 year olds.

Walker revealed in an interview with the Sydney Morning Herald in April 2026 that she is not religious, but considers herself an agnostic and a humanist.
