= Ralph Babet =

Australian politician (born 1983)

Senator Ralph Babet
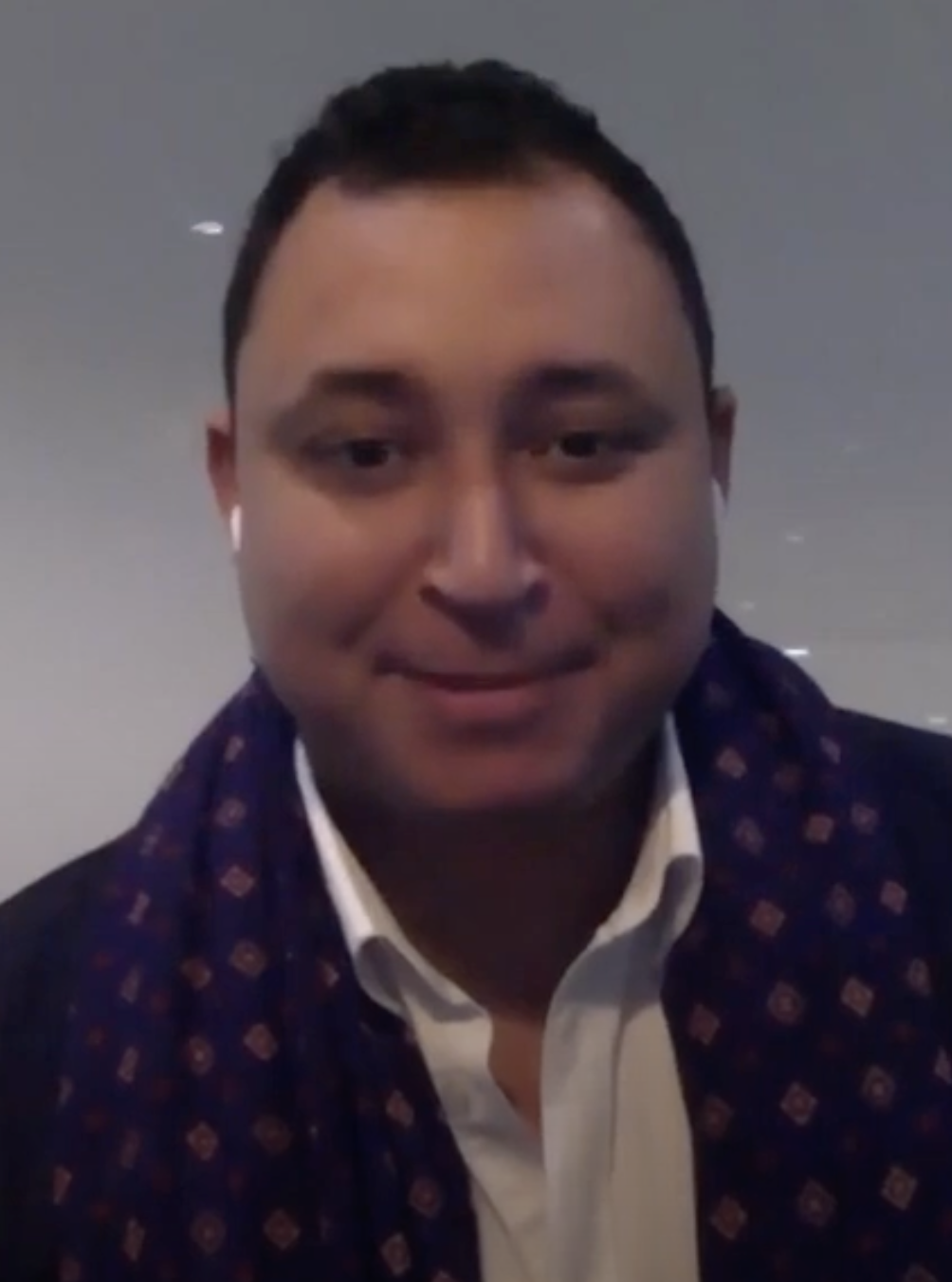

Leader of the United Australia Party
- Incumbent
- Assumed office 27 February 2024
- Chairman: Clive Palmer
- Preceded by: Craig Kelly

Senator for Victoria
- Incumbent
- Assumed office 1 July 2022

Personal details
- Born: 29 June 1983 (age 43) Rodrigues, Mauritius
- Party: United Australia (since 2022)
- Other political affiliations: Australian Sovereignty Party (2010)
- Education: St John's Regional College
- Alma mater: Swinburne University of Technology (BBus)
- Occupation: Real estate agent; Politician
- Website: senatorbabet.com.au
- Nickname: Deej

Ralph Emmanuel Didier "Deej" Babet (/bəˈbɛt/ bə-BET; born 29 June 1983) is a Mauritian-born Australian far-right (Note: Attributed to multiple sources:) politician. He has been a senator for Victoria in the Australian Parliament since 2022, representing the United Australia Party (UAP), and is the party's only current federal elected representative. Prior to entering politics, he was a real estate agent.

== Early life and career ==
Babet was born on 29 June 1983 on the remote Indian Ocean island of Rodrigues, part of the Republic of Mauritius. He and his family migrated to Australia in 1990 when he was seven years old, and he became an Australian citizen in 1993. He spoke French as his first language.

Babet grew up in Doveton, attending the Holy Family Catholic Primary School and later St John's Regional College in Dandenong. He holds the degree of Bachelor of Business from Swinburne University of Technology and an advanced diploma in sales and marketing from the Chisholm Institute.

On Christmas Day 2014 in Toorak, Babet was charged with criminal damage. On 6 March 2017, a criminal damage charge was recorded but no conviction was given by the Melbourne Magistrates' Court. He was instead ordered to participate in a diversion program.

On 6 September 2015, he was charged with unlawful assault in South Melbourne. Babet pleaded guilty to the charges at the Melbourne Magistrates Court on 22 August 2018. In exchange for Babet's compliance with a bond/undertaking, the charges were dismissed.

Together with his brother Matt, Babet runs a real estate firm. His brother unsuccessfully contested the seat of Bruce in the 2022 federal election.

== Political career ==
Babet was on the committee of the Australian Sovereignty Party in 2010. The party never contested any elections.

Babet renounced his Mauritian citizenship in March 2022.

While United Australia Party chairman Clive Palmer ran a candidate in every seat and spent a reported $100,000,000 on the campaign, Babet was the sole success for the UAP at the 2022 federal election by taking the sixth Victorian senate seat from the Liberal Party's Greg Mirabella. According to psephologist Antony Green's analysis of the Victorian Senate Election, Babet's win was due to strong One Nation preference flows once One Nation was excluded. Green went on to say that once Babet was ahead he could lose only if Mirabella's preferences flowed to Labor, which was unlikely since the Coalition's how-to-vote card had recommended second preference to the United Australia Party.

On 8 September 2022, the United Australia Party was voluntarily deregistered by the Australian Electoral Commission. Babet stated the deregistration was made for "administrative reasons" and that he would continue to represent the deregistered party in the Senate. Babet is able to continue identifying as a United Australia Party member in the Senate, with the office of the Clerk of the Senate stating that Babet's status as a UAP senator would not change until he advised the office otherwise.

On 9 September 2023, Babet launched a bid in the Federal Court to force the AEC to acknowledge crosses as a no vote for the Indigenous Voice referendum. On 20 September 2023 Justice Steven Rares ruled in favour of the AEC on merits, and ordered Babet and the co-applicant Palmer to pay the AEC's costs. On 9 October 2023, Babet and Palmer appealed the case with the full Federal Court and lost unanimously. Justice Anthony Besanko ordered costs be paid.

In April 2025, Babet was seen as part of the Trumpet of Patriots campaign launch for the 2025 federal election. However, as of 20 April 2025, his parliamentary profile shows that he is still a member of the UAP. Following the May 2025 federal election, in which Trumpet of Patriots failed to win any seats, Babet announced that he would not seek re-election in 2028, citing that he did not want to become a "swamp creature" by remaining a senator. Babet further stated he "failed" as a Senator, and plans to return to the private sector after his term ends.

=== Controversies ===
Avatar of Senator Babet

Senator Babet
(@senatorbabet)
tweeted:

My nigger nailed this one. One hundred percent. 💯

10 November 2024

Avatar of Senator Babet

Senator Babet
(@senatorbabet)
tweeted:

In my house, we say phaggot [sic], retard and nigger. We are sick of you woke ass clowns. Cry more. Write an article. Tweet about me. No one cares what you think.

10 November 2024

Throughout his career, Babet has come under fire for comments he has made or defended, especially on social media, that have been criticised as racist, sexist, ableist and anti-LGBTQ rhetoric, including his use of slurs. Babet has denied these allegations and defends his comments as free speech.

On 17 February 2024, Babet appeared in a photo with a member of the National Socialist Network, who was performing a partial Nazi salute. Babet distanced himself from the man and told The Age "I don't know the guy".

On 10 November 2024, Babet again drew controversy when he tweeted racial and homophobic slurs and promoted a misogynistic Andrew Tate video. Following this tweet, Babet was censured by the Australian Senate for "his inflammatory use of hate speech, designed to drive division for his own political benefit".

On 16 May 2025, following the birth of Jagger Kerr, the son of soccer players Sam Kerr (the captain of the Matildas) and Kristie Mewis (her American fiancée), who are in a lesbian relationship, Babet joined Family First leader Lyle Shelton in criticising Kerr and Mewis for the birth of their child, with Babet claiming that he needs "a mother and a father". In response to the comments from Babet and Shelton as well as homophobic abuse they received online, Kerr's club Chelsea and the club's pride branch Chelsea Pride condemned the abuse and criticism Kerr and Mewis received. Kerr's Matildas teammate Katrina Gorry, who is also in a lesbian relationship and is a mother to two children, also criticised Babet and Shelton for their comments.

On 18 August 2025, Babet defended Australian rules footballer Izak Rankine in a Facebook post after Rankine referred to Isaac Quaynor as a "faggot" during Rankine's Adelaide Crows' victory over Quaynor's Collingwood Magpies in Round 23 of the 2025 AFL season. Babet claimed that ending a player's season over "words" was too harsh and that the Australian Football League (AFL) was hypocritical in suspending Rankine whilst allowing American rapper Snoop Dogg to headline the pregame entertainment for the 2025 AFL Grand Final despite him having previously used the word in some of his songs.

On 21 August 2025, Sky News Australia commentator Chris Kenny criticised Babet for an offensive tweet, in which Babet asked his followers: "Would you date and marry a woman well past her prime?". Fellow right-wing Senator and One Nation founder and leader Pauline Hanson defended the comments on Sky News, telling Kenny to "get over it".

== Political views ==
Babet's political views have been described as far-right and populist.

Babet says that he stands for freedom and individual liberties. He is against vaccine mandates and the "ever-growing power and authoritarianism of the government", and he believes the mandates are "segregation". He says he is not vaccinated against COVID-19, considering the vaccine to be "emergency gene therapy", a belief that has been widely discredited.

During the campaign he said his first order of business will be to push for a Bill of Rights. Babet claims to be a former Greens voter, although he now considers the ideology of the Greens to be "cancerous to a free and open society". He does not consider the science of climate change to be "settled" or believe that humans are responsible for the cause. He believes that there is an equal number of scientists on either side of the debate. On energy solutions he believes "solar panels and batteries are bad for the environment".

Babet says he is "not happy" with transgender issues being taught at schools, saying he disagrees with "little boys and girls being taught that you can be a boy one day and a girl the next day".

Babet has promoted a number of conspiracy theories, including that the 2022 election was going to be rigged. He also supports the Great Reset conspiracy theory and also believes that the World Economic Forum is pushing non-white immigration in an effort to create a tyrannical world government and is "trying to do away with the concept of private ownership".

Babet has been openly critical of the "billionaire circus" that he perceives to be the World Economic Forum, while at the same time praising some billionaires including Elon Musk, Clive Palmer (who funded the electoral campaign which won Babet's seat) and Donald Trump. In his opening Senate speech, Babet spoke of his disdain for "radical Marxists".

Babet considered his $200,000 parliamentary salary a "pay cut" and believes that it is too little for the "suffering" that he will endure in parliament and that he would "be happier" staying in Narre Warren running his real estate business.

Babet opposed the Voice to Parliament.

Babet considers voluntary euthanasia "murder", calling it a "darkness that will engulf us all".

Babet is critical of the Australian Government's proposed legislation to ban children under 16 from social media, tweeting that the "authoritarian measures are a Trojan Horse" to "wield the big stick over Australian citizens and control what we do". He also referred to the Australian Government as a "far-left extremist government".

Babet voted against the 2026 Hate speech laws.

Babet attended the two week Australian Defence Force Parliamentary program in 2023, but was criticised by the Australian Defence Association (an independent think tank) for his publication of photos wearing military uniform for blurring the lines between politics and armed forces. Neil James, the executive director of the Australian Defence Association, said "misusing the parliamentary exchange program is disgraceful", and that Babet's frequent publication in military wear was "cosplaying".

== Personal life ==
Babet is Catholic.
