= Candidates of the 2025 Australian federal election =

The 2025 Australian federal election was held on 3 May 2025 to elect 150 seats of the House of Representatives and 40 out of the 76 Senate seats. At the election, the Albanese government was elected to a second term of government in a landslide victory, substantially increasing its majority in the Parliament of Australia.

Nominations for candidates were closed on 10 April 2025, and the Australian Electoral Commission declared the nominations on 11 April. 1,456 candidates (1,126 for the House of Representatives and 330 for the Senate) contested the election. 898 candidates were male, 547 were female and 11 unspecified.

== Retiring members ==
The seats of Hinkler (Queensland) and Maribyrnong (Victoria) were vacant at the time the federal election was called, following the resignation of Keith Pitt (Nationals) and Bill Shorten (Labor) on 19 and 20 January 2025 respectively. No by-elections were held for the seats due to their proximity to the general election.

=== Labor ===
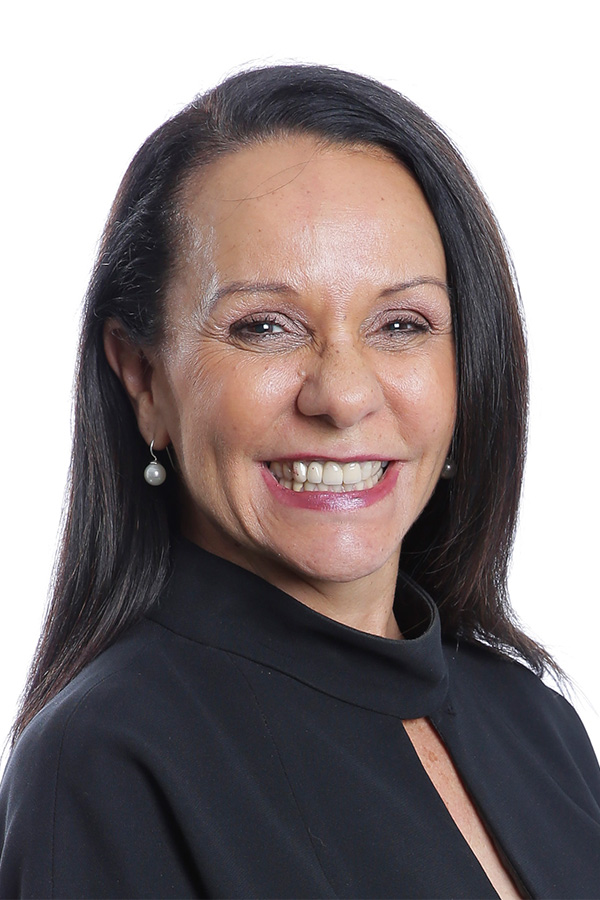
Linda Burney; Minister for Indigenous Australians (2022–2024) and the first Aboriginal woman member of the House of Representatives

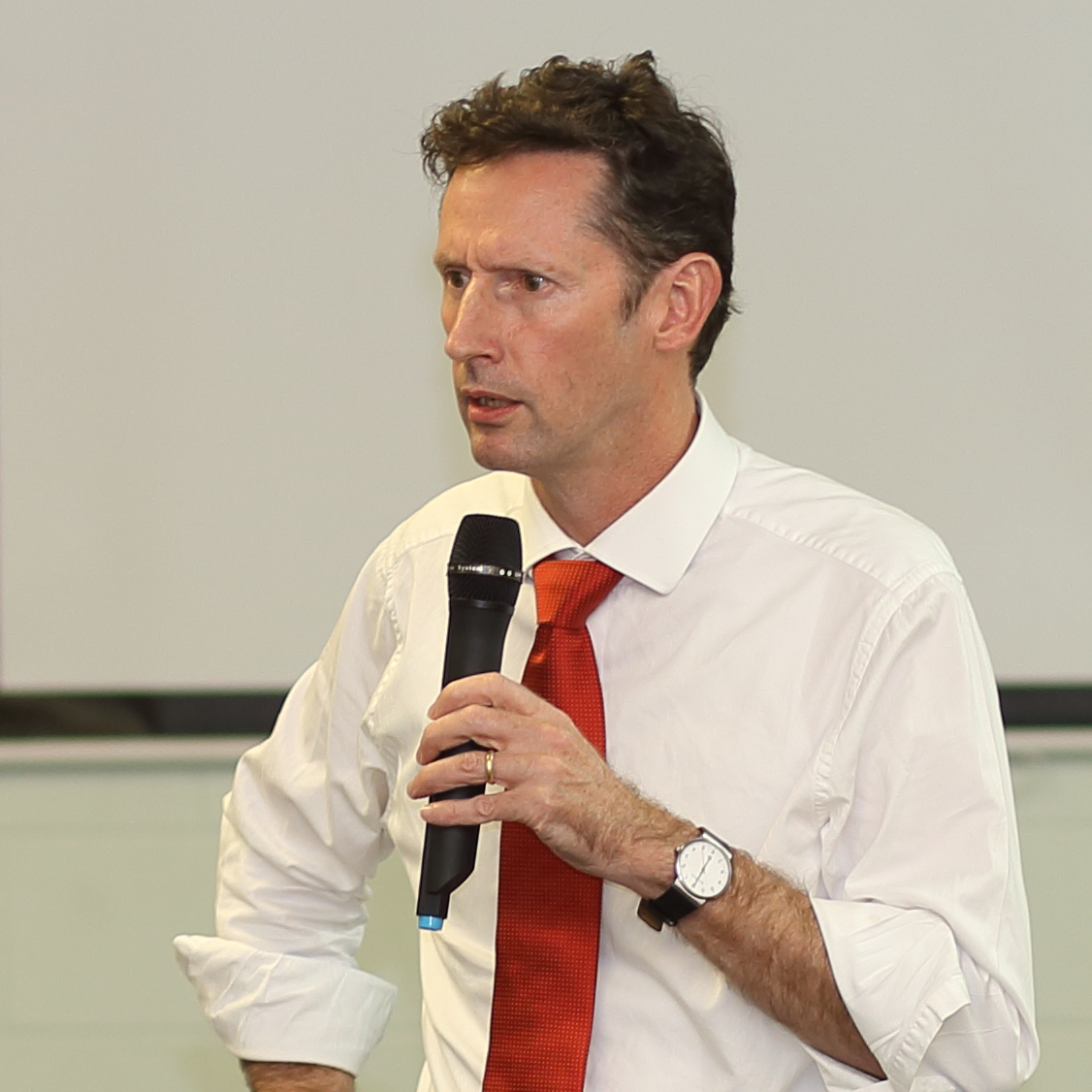
Stephen Jones; Assistant Treasurer of Australia and Minister for Financial Services (2022–2025)

- Linda Burney MP (Barton, NSW) – announced retirement on 25 July 2024
- Stephen Jones MP (Whitlam, NSW) – announced retirement on 30 January 2025
- Brian Mitchell MP (Lyons, Tas) – announced retirement on 15 November 2024
- Brendan O'Connor MP (Gorton, Vic) – announced retirement on 25 July 2024
- Graham Perrett MP (Moreton, Qld) – announced retirement on 22 August 2024
- Maria Vamvakinou MP (Calwell, Vic) – announced retirement on 9 June 2024
- Senator Catryna Bilyk (Tas) – announced retirement on 22 November 2024
- Senator Louise Pratt (WA) – announced retirement on 20 February 2024

=== Liberal ===
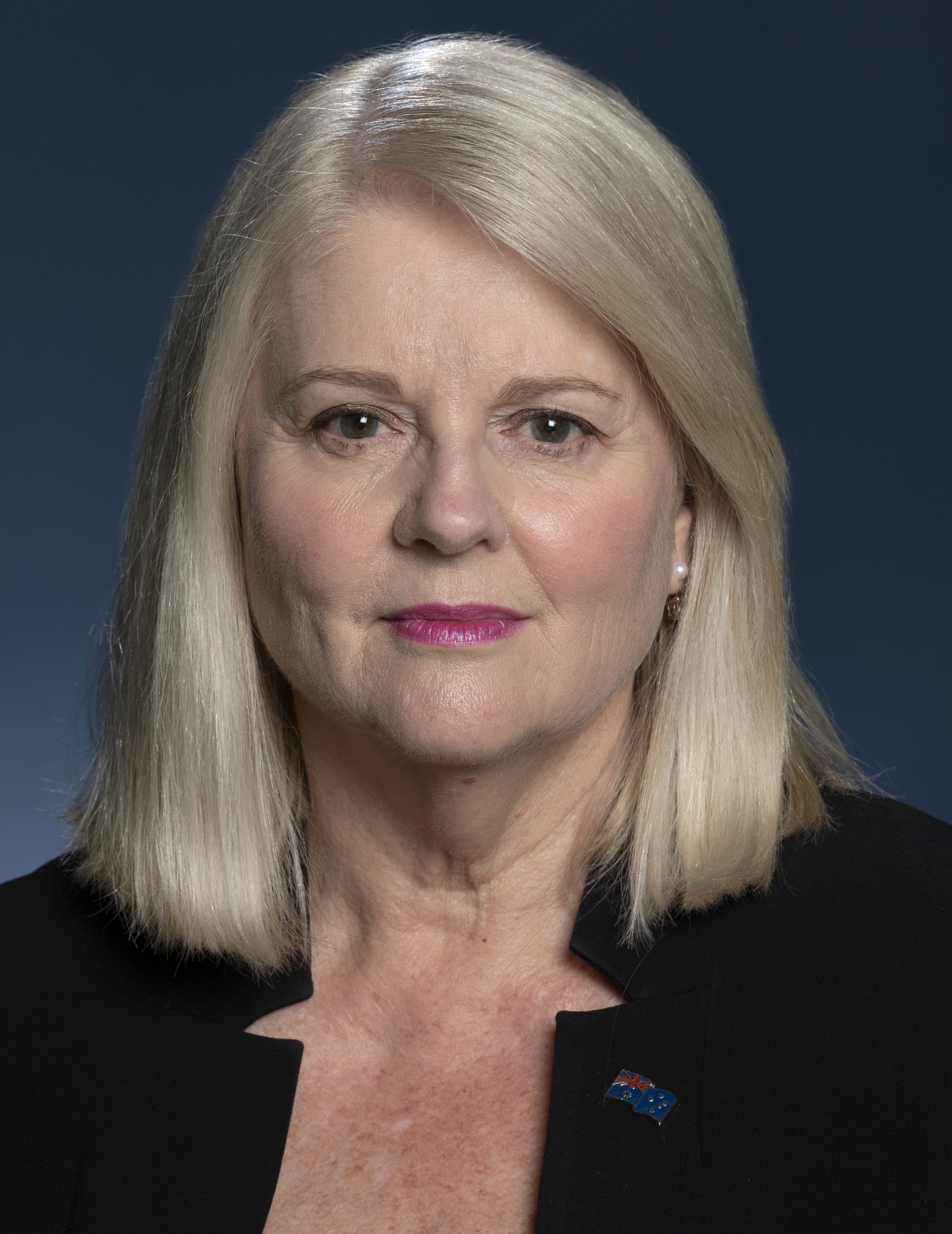
Karen Andrews; Minister for Industry, Science and Technology (2018–2021) and Minister for Home Affairs (2021–2022)

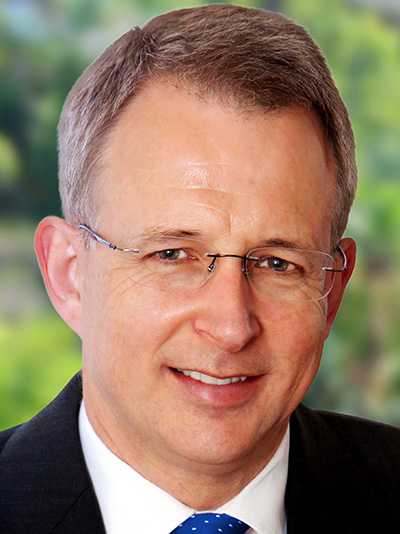
Paul Fletcher; Manager of Opposition Business in the House (2022–2025), minister of various portfolios (2015–2022)

- Karen Andrews MP (McPherson, Qld) – announced retirement on 18 April 2023
- Warren Entsch MP (Leichhardt, Qld) – announced retirement on 9 April 2023
- Paul Fletcher MP (Bradfield, NSW) – announced retirement on 10 December 2024
- Nola Marino MP (Forrest, WA) – announced retirement on 4 December 2023
- Gavin Pearce MP (Braddon, Tas) – announced retirement on 11 June 2024
- Rowan Ramsey MP (Grey, SA) – announced retirement on 25 March 2024
- Senator Linda Reynolds (WA) – announced retirement on 12 February 2024

=== Nationals ===
- Mark Coulton MP (Parkes, NSW) – announced retirement on 25 March 2024
- David Gillespie MP (Lyne, NSW) – announced retirement on 19 October 2024

=== Independent ===
- Kylea Tink MP (North Sydney, NSW; abolished) – announced retirement on 7 December 2024

== House of Representatives ==
Incumbent members are listed in bold text and marked with a †. Successful candidates are highlighted in the relevant colour and marked with an asterisk. Letters following the names of Coalition candidates in the states (excluding Queensland) denote membership of either the Liberal party (L) or National party (N) of that state.

=== Australian Capital Territory ===
Table of House candidates, Australian Capital Territory
Electorate	Held by	Labor	Liberal	Greens	Independent	Other
Bean	Labor	**David Smith***†	David Lamerton	Sam Carter	Jessie Price	
Canberra	Labor	**Alicia Payne***†	Will Roche	Isabel Mudford	Claire Miles	Mary-Jane Liddicoat (HEART); Teresa McTaggart (AJP)
Fenner	Labor	**Andrew Leigh***†	Bola Olatunbosun	Dani Hunterford		Elizabeth Kikkert (FFP)

=== New South Wales ===
On 27 July 2023, the Electoral Commissioner determined the number of members of the House of Representatives to be chosen in each state and territory. The seat entitlement of New South Wales was reduced from forty-seven to forty-six in this determination. On 12 September 2024, the Electoral Commission determined that the division of North Sydney would be abolished and redistributed to the divisions of Warringah, Bradfield and Bennelong.

Table of House candidates, New South Wales
Electorate	Held by	Labor	Coalition	Greens	Independent	One Nation	Other
Banks	Liberal	Zhi Soon*	**David Coleman** (L)†	Natalie Hanna	John Coyne	Todd Nicol	Marika Momircevski (LP); Phillip Pearce (AD); Allan Taruste (TOP)
Barton	Labor	Ash Ambihaipahar*	Fiona Douskou (L)	Manal Bahsa		Christos Nicolis	Vinlay Kolhatkar (LP); Thomas Pambris (TOP)
Bennelong	Labor	**Jerome Laxale***†	Scott Yung (L)	Adam Hart		Craig Bennett	John August (FUSION); Eric Chan (FFP); Barry Devine (HEART); Robert Nalbandian (TOP)
Berowra	Liberal	Benson Koschinski	**Julian Leeser** (L)*†	Martin Cousins	Tina Brown; Roger Woodward	Gerald Mattinson	Stephen Bastian (TOP); Brendan Clarke (FUSION)
Blaxland	Labor	**Jason Clare***†	Courtney Nguyen (L)	Omar Sakr	Ahmed Ouf	Mitchell Klievens	Jennifer Di Girolamo (FFP); Mike Luo (LP)
Bradfield	Liberal	Louise McCallum	Gisele Kapterian (L)	Harjit Singh	Nicolette Boele*; Andy Yin	John Manton	Samuel Joseph Gunning (LP); Rosemary Mulligan (TOP)
Calare	Independent	Julie Cunningham	Sam Farraway (N)	Ben Parker	**Andrew Gee***†; Kate Hook	Jennifer Hughes	Ross Hazelton (FFP); Jase Lesage (SFF); Vicki O'Leary (TOP); Sue Raye (LCP)
Chifley	Labor	**Ed Husic***†	Allan Green (L)	Sukhjinder Singh	Leigh Burns	Tony Nikolic	Ryan Archer (TOP); Jamie Green (FFP); Rohan Laxmanalal (AJP)
Cook	Liberal	Simon Earle	**Simon Kennedy** (L)*†	Martin Moore		Mark Preston	Natalie Fuller (FFP); Sharon Hammond (TOP)
Cowper	National	Greg Vigors	**Pat Conaghan** (N)*†	Wendy Firefly	Zeke Daley; Caz Heise	Chris Walsh	Peter Jackel (FFP); Geoffrey Marlow (FUSION); Megan Mathew (LCP); Geoffrey Shannon (TOP); Paul Templeton (LP)
Cunningham	Labor	**Alison Byrnes***†	Amanda Ivaneza (L)	Jess Whittaker		John Fuller	Alexis Garnaut-Miller (ACP); Tim Lavers (AJP)
Dobell	Labor	**Emma McBride***†	Brendan Small (L)	Simon Cooper		Martin Stevenson	Isaac Chalik (LP); Tim Claydon (LCP); Patrick Murphy (AJP); Anthony Tawaf (TOP)
Eden-Monaro	Labor	**Kristy McBain***†	Jo van der Plaat (L)	Emma Goward	Brian Fisher; Andrew Thaler	Richard Graham	Fraser Buchanan (HEART); Wade Cox (TOP)
Farrer	Liberal	Glen Hyde	**Sussan Ley** (L)*†	Richard Hendrie	Michelle Milthorpe	Emma Hicks	Tanya Hargraves (TOP); David O'Reilly (PFP); Rebecca Scriven (FFP); Peter Sinclair (SFF)
Fowler	Independent	Tu Le	Vivek Singha (L)	Avery Howard	**Dai Le***†	Tony Margos	Jared Athavle (FFP); Victor Tey (LP)
Gilmore	Labor	**Fiona Phillips***†	Andrew Constance (L)	Debbie Killian	Kate Dezarnaulds	John Hawke	Graham Brown (FFP); Adrian Carle (LCP); Melissa Wise (TOP)
Grayndler	Labor	**Anthony Albanese***†	David Smallbone (L)	Hannah Thomas	David Bradbury	Rodney Smith	Cheri Burrell (TOP)
Greenway	Labor	**Michelle Rowland***†	Rattan Virk (L)	Palaniappan Subramanian	Robert Stuckley	Edwin Swann	Justin Mulligan (TOP); Mark Rex (LP)
Hughes	Liberal	David Moncrieff*	**Jenny Ware** (L)†	Catherine Dyson		Deborah Swinbourn	Nathaniel Marsh (FFP); David Miller (ACP); Alex Scarfone (TOP); Elvis Sonisic (LP)
Hume	Liberal	Thomas Huang	**Angus Taylor** (L)*†	Steve Bruce	Peter McLean	Helen Ducker	Adrian Rees (LP); Bryan Siedel (FFP); Troy Wozniak (TOP)
Hunter	Labor	**Dan Repacholi***†	Sue Gilroy (N)	Louise Stokes		Stuart Bonds	Kyle Boddan (SFF); Victoria Davies (AJP); Paul Farrelly (FFP); Andrew Fenwick (LCP); Suellen Wrightson (TOP)
Kingsford Smith	Labor	**Matt Thistlethwaite***†	Brad Cole (L)	Keiron Brown	Elsa Parker	Mark Jelic	
Lindsay	Liberal	Hollie McLean	**Melissa McIntosh** (L)*†	Aaron McAllister	Jim Saleam	Christopher Buckley	Vanessa Blazi (AJP); Antony Emmanuel (FFP)
Lyne	National	Digby Wilson	Alison Penfold (N)*	Tom Ferrier	Jeremy Miller	Colin Hughes	Stephen Burke (ACP); Cathy Charsley (TOP); Mark Hornshaw (LP); Keys Manley (LCP); David Masters (FFP)
Macarthur	Labor	**Mike Freelander***†	Binod Paudel (L)	Frankie Scott		Gregory Grogan	Graham Charlesworth (FFP); Connie Harvey (LP); Edward Palmer (FUSION)
Mackellar	Independent	Jeffrey Quinn	James Brown (L)	Ethan Hrnjak	Lisa Cotton; **Sophie Scamps***†; Mandeep Singh	Brad Hayman	Justin Addison (LP); Amber Robertson (TOP)
Macquarie	Labor	**Susan Templeman***†	Mike Creed (L)	Terry Morgan		Matthew Jacobson	Roger Bowen (FFP); Joaquim De Lima (LP)
McMahon	Labor	**Chris Bowen***†	Carmen Lazar (L)	Ben Hammond	Matthew Camenzuli	Melissa Janicska	
Mitchell	Liberal	Dilvan Bircan	**Alex Hawke** (L)*†	Ben Speechly		Brendan McCreanor	Mark Crocker (TOP)
New England	National	Laura Hughes	**Barnaby Joyce** (N)*†	Wendy Wales	Natasha Ledger	Brent Larkham	Todd Juchau (TOP); Holly Masters (FFP)
Newcastle	Labor	**Sharon Claydon***†	Assari McPhee (L)	Charlotte McCabe	Robert Creech	Phillip Heyne	Jason Briggs (FFP); Steve O'Brien (SA); Jennifer Stefanac (TOP)
Page	National	Wendy Backhous	**Kevin Hogan** (N)*†	Luke Robinson	Jordan Colless; Richard Wells	Peter Nottle	Jennifer Baker (ACP); Andrew Grady (FFP); Josh Pianca (SFF); Donna Pike (TOP); Brenton Williams (LP)
Parkes	National	Nathan Fell	Jamie Chaffey (N)*	Trish Frail	Stuart Howe	Mark Carter	Maurice Davey (FFP); Sally Edwards (LP); Stephen Pope (SFF); Petrus van der Steen (TOP); Bob Wilson (IAPA)
Parramatta	Labor	**Andrew Charlton***†	Katie Mullens (L)	Liz Tilly	Maa Malini; Tanya-lee Quinn	Nicholas Matzen	Ganesh Loke (TOP); Ben Somerson (LP)
Paterson	Labor	**Meryl Swanson***†	Laurence Antcliff (L)	Paul Johns	Rod Holding; Philip Penfold; April Scott	Arnon Wither	Peter Arena (TOP); Sandra Briggs (FFP); Daniel Dryden (LCP)
Reid	Labor	**Sally Sitou***†	Grange Chung (L)	Joanna Somerville	Steven Commerford	Gina Ingrouille	Clinton Mead (LP); David Sarikaya (TOP)
Richmond	Labor	**Justine Elliot***†	Kimberly Hone (N)	Mandy Nolan	Kevin Loughrey; James McKenzie	Ian Mye	Richard Curtin (PFP); Vivian McMahon (LCP); Phillip Peterkin (TOP); Ian Willis (LP)
Riverina	National	Mark Jeffreson	**Michael McCormack** (N)*†	Pheonix Valxori	Barbara Baikie; Jake Davis; James Gooden; Grant Hardwick; Jenny Rolfe	Mark Craig	Mark Burge (FFP); Richard Foley (ACP); Desiree Gregory (SFF); Christine Onley (LP)
Robertson	Labor	**Gordon Reid***†	Lucy Wicks (L)	Cheryl Wallace	Lisa Bellamy	Matt Lloyd	David Borg (TOP); Tom Lillicrap (LCP)
Shortland	Labor	**Pat Conroy***†	Emma King (L)	Therese Doyle	James Pheils	Barry Reed	Pietro Di Girolamo (FFP); Geoffrey Robertson (LP)
Sydney	Labor	**Tanya Plibersek***†	Alex Xu (L)	Luc Velez		Vedran Torbarac	Rachel Evans (SA)
Warringah	Independent	Celine Varghese-Fell	Jaimee Rogers (L)	Bonnie Harvey	David Spratt; **Zali Steggall***†	Gavin Wright	Sean McLeod (LP); Anthony Rose (TOP)
Watson	Labor	**Tony Burke***†	Zakir Alam (L)	Jocelyn Brewer	Ziad Basyouny; Zain Khan	Elisha Trevena	Vanessa Hadchiti (LP); John Koukoulis (TOP); Johnny Mannah (FFP)
Wentworth	Independent	Savanna Peake	Ro Knox (L)	Nick Ward	Michael Richmond; **Allegra Spender***†	James Sternhell	
Werriwa	Labor	**Anne Stanley***†	Sam Kayal (L)	Janet Castle	Jamal Daoud	Ian Cimera	Jacob Balestri (FFP); Shannon McGlone (TOP); Andrew Murphy (LCP); Gemma Noiosi (LP)
Whitlam	Labor	Carol Berry*	Nathaniel Smith (L)	Jamie Dixon	Ben Britton; Glenn Butterfield; Paddy Moylan	Sharon Cousins	Angelo Cuda (TOP); Cheryl Hinton (ACP); Raymond Khoury (LP)

=== Northern Territory ===
Table of House candidates, Australian Capital Territory
Electorate	Held by	Labor	CLP	Greens	Independent	One Nation	Other
Lingiari	Labor	**Marion Scrymgour***†	Lisa Siebert	Blair McFarland		Sakellarios Bairamis	Peter Flynn (ACP); Chris Tomlins (IAPA)
Solomon	Labor	**Luke Gosling***†	Lisa Bayliss	Jonathan Parry	Jany Davies; Phil Scott	Benjamin Craker	Brian Kristo (ACP)

=== Queensland ===
Table of House candidates, Queensland
Electorate	Held by	Labor	LNP	Greens	Independent	One Nation	Other
Blair	Labor	**Shayne Neumann***†	Carl Mutzelburg	Paul Toner		Brendan Kross	Anthony Bull (LP); Kathryn Chadwick (PFP); Anthony Hopkins (LCP); Angela Lowery (AJP); Edward McDonald (TOP); John Purdon (FFP)
Bonner	LNP	Kara Cook*	**Ross Vasta**†	Wen Li	Elizabeth Lewis	Christopher de Winter	Shalini Bhasin (LP); Ross Dovey (FFP); Craig Hill (LCP); David Wright (TOP)
Bowman	LNP	Darcy Brown	**Henry Pike***†	Kristie Lockhart	Shaun Holloway	Matthew Knight	David Todd (FFP); Gary Williamson (TOP)
Brisbane	Greens	Madonna Jarrett*	Trevor Evans	**Stephen Bates**†		Cheryl Wood	Rachel Blackwood (FUSION); Kirsten Sands (FFP); Brian Thiele (TOP); Joseph Wheeler (PFP)
Capricornia	LNP	Emily Mawson	**Michelle Landry***†	Mick Jones		Cheryl Kempton	Stephen Andrew (TOP); Kerri Hislop (FFP)
Dawson	LNP	Neil Wallace	**Andrew Willcox***†	Paula Creen		Darren Brown	Alexander Beaumont (PFP); Michael Lockye (TOP); Amanda Nickson (FFP)
Dickson	LNP	Ali France*	**Peter Dutton**†	Vinnie Batten	Ellie Smith	Joel Stevenson	Maureen Brohman (AJP); Suniti Hewett (FFP); Michael Jessop (TOP); David Zaloudek (LCP)
Fadden	LNP	Letita Del Fabbro	**Cameron Caldwell***†	Andrew Stimson	Stewart Brooker	Nick Muir	John Armfield (PFP); Patricia Martin (FFP); Nathan O'Brian (TOP); Dennis Pukallus (ACP)
Fairfax	LNP	Naomi McQueen	**Ted O'Brien***†	Sue Etheridge	Paul McKeown; Francine Wiig	Beatrice Marsh	Gregory Ryzy (TOP); Rhys Sanderson (FFP)
Fisher	LNP	Morrison Lakey	**Andrew Wallace***†	Renay Wells	Keryn Jones	Benjamin Kelly	Bronwen Bolitho (FFP); Denis Fricot (TOP); James Pidgeon (PFP)
Flynn	LNP	Helen Madell	**Colin Boyce***†	Paul Bambrick	John Anderson; Duncan Scott	David Harris	Peter Dorian (FFP); Lance Price (PFP); Peter Zunker (TOP)
Forde	LNP	Rowan Holzberger*	**Bert van Manen**†	Kirsty Petersen	Chris Greaves	Matthew Lambert	Alf de-Hombre (ACP); Jacob Hiscock (TOP); Corneliu Pop (FFP)
Griffith	Greens	Renee Coffey*	Anthony Bishop	**Max Chandler-Mather**†		Lindsay Bell	Andrea Campbell (FFP); Aaron Hayes (TOP); Dion Hunt (PFP)
Groom	LNP	Richard Edwards	**Garth Hamilton***†	Alyce Nelligan	Suzie Holt; Kirstie Smolenski	Rebecca Konz	Jamie Marr (TOP); Alexandra Todd (FFP)
Herbert	LNP	Edwina Andrew	**Phillip Thompson***†	Chris Evans		Ross MacDonald	Martin Brewster (TOP); Darryn Casson (KAP); Felicity Cole (PFP); Felicity Roser (FFP)
Hinkler	LNP	Trish Mears	David Batt*	Andrew McLean	Michael O'Brien	Tyler Carman	Robert Blohberger (TOP); Kerry Petrus (FFP)
Kennedy	KAP	Sharon Winn	Annette Swaine	Carole Stanford	Steven Clare	Kate Harris	**Bob Katter***† (KAP); Douglas Lush (FFP); Mark Westcott (TOP)
Leichhardt	LNP	Matt Smith*	Jeremy Neal	Phillip Musumeci	Norman Miller	Robert Hicks	Daniel Collins (KAP); Nicholas Daniels (LCP); Greg Dowling (TOP); Lloyd Russell (LP); Les Searle (FFP)
Lilley	Labor	**Anika Wells***†	Kimberley Washington	Melissa Stevens		Michelle McKay	Alan Denaro (FFP); Joshua Morrison (TOP)
Longman	LNP	Rhiannyn Douglas	**Terry Young***†	Gabrielle Unverzagt		Peter McCasker	Malachi Brogden Hearne (FFP) (disendorsed); Benjamin Wood (TOP)
Maranoa	LNP	Alex Newman	**David Littleproud***†	Elizabeth Johnston		Sharon Duncan	Jonathan Cumes (TOP); Rod Draper (PFP); Michael Offerdahl (LP); John Whittle (FFP)
McPherson	LNP	Alice Price	Leon Rebello*	Amanda Kennealy	Michelle Faye; Erchana Murray-Bartlett	Zyion Attiig	Gary Biggs (LP); Max Creswick (TOP); Harry Hatzikalimnios (PFP); Jennifer Horsburgh (AJP); Jeff Knipe (LCP); Neena Tester (FFP)
Moncrieff	LNP	Blair Stuart	**Angie Bell***†	Sally Spain	Nicole Arrowsmith; Waddah Weld Ali	Glen Wadsworth	Ruth Fea (FFP); Vik Naicker (TOP); Natasha Szorkovsky (PFP)
Moreton	Labor	Julie-Ann Campbell*	Henry Swindon	Remah Naji		Grant Spork	Natarsha Billing (PFP); Max Hooper (ACP); Christian Julias (TOP); Melinda Keller (FFP)
Oxley	Labor	**Milton Dick***†	Kevin Burns	Brandan Holt	Mike Head	Darren Baker	Mark McGuire (TOP); William Tento (FFP)
Petrie	LNP	Emma Comer*	**Luke Howarth**†	Nikil Paul		Nicole Shires	Sharan Hall (FFP); Ryan Mensink (TOP)
Rankin	Labor	**Jim Chalmers***†	Paul Darwen	Joshua Riethmuller		Kyle Lentz	Alex Bainbridge (SA); Lana Hudson (PFP); Janet Lindbom (TOP); Carol Ordish (FFP)
Ryan	Greens	Rebecca Hack	Margaret Forrest	**Elizabeth Watson-Brown***†		Robbie Elsom	Nicole De Lapp (PFP); Donna Gallehawk (FFP); Ryan Hunt (TOP); Gina Masterton (FUSION)
Wide Bay	LNP	Elliott Chalmers	**Llew O'Brien***†	Emma Buhse	Casey Iddon	Chad Burgess	Kirsti Kenningale (FFP); Gabrial Pennicott (TOP)
Wright	LNP	Pam McCreadie	**Scott Buchholz***†	Nicole Thompson		Natalie Davis	Justin McGuiness (PFP); Julie Rose (FFP); Chloe Snyman (AJP); Scott Thompson (TOP)

=== South Australia ===
Table of House candidates, South Australia
Electorate	Held by	Labor	Liberal	Greens	Independent	One Nation	Other
Adelaide	Labor	**Steve Georganas***†	Amy Grantham	Mat Monti		Riley Size	Steven Marks (TOP); Matthew McMillan (FUSION); Lionel Pengilley (AJP)
Barker	Liberal	James Rothe	**Tony Pasin***†	Major Moogy Sumner	Rosa Hillam; Ian Penno; Cody Scholes	Jennifer Troeth	Michael Brohier (FFP); Robert Jameson (TOP); Jonathan Pietzsch (Nat)
Boothby	Labor	**Louise Miller-Frost***†	Nicolle Flint	Joanna Wells		Tonya Scott	Nicole Hussey (TOP); Sam Prior (FFP)
Grey	Liberal	Karin Bolton	Tom Venning*	Kathryn Hardwick-Franco	Anita Kuss	Brandon Turton	Laury Bais (TOP); Peter Borda (Nat); Kylie Evans (FFP)
Hindmarsh	Labor	**Mark Butler***†	Christopher Lehmann	Matthew Wright	Jake Hall-Evans	Rocco Deangelis	Adrien Aloe (FUSION); Matt Pastro (AJP); Alex Tennikoff (FFP); Andrew Townsend (TOP)
Kingston	Labor	**Amanda Rishworth***†	Jim Rishworth	John Photakis		Nathan Skrlj	Russell Jackson (TOP); Bin Liu (AJP); Steve Price (FFP)
Makin	Labor	**Tony Zappia***†	Irena Zagladov	Samuel Moore		Alison Dew-Fennell	Mark Aldridge (TOP) (Resigned); Amelie Hanna (FUSION); Sue Nancarrow (FFP); Geoff Russell (AJP)
Mayo	Centre Alliance	Marisa Bell	Zane Basic	Genevieve Dawson-Scott		Rebecca Hewett	Simeon Bidwell (TOP); Benjamin Hackett (FFP); **Rebekha Sharkie***† (CA)
Spence	Labor	**Matt Burnell***†	Daniel Wild	Luke Skinner	Kym Hanton	Darryl Bothe	John Bennett (FFP); Paul Morrell (TOP); Miranda Joyce Smith (AJP)
Sturt	Liberal	Claire Clutterham*	**James Stevens**†	Katie McCusker	Verity Cooper	Peter Bogatec	Nicholas Duffield (TOP); Mervin Joshua (FFP)

=== Tasmania ===
Table of House candidates, Tasmania
Electorate	Held by	Labor	Liberal	Greens	Independent	One Nation	Other
Bass	Liberal	Jess Teesdale*	**Bridget Archer**†	Charlene McLennan	George Razay	Jordan Potter	Ray Broomhall (TOP); Caroline Larner (ACP)
Braddon	Liberal	Anne Urquhart*	Mal Hingston	Erin Morrow	Adam Martin	Christopher Methorst	Stephen Kenney (TOP)
Clark	Independent	Heidi Heck	Marilena Di Florio	Janet Shelley	**Andrew Wilkie***†	Cathy Griggs	
Franklin	Labor	**Julie Collins***†	Josh Garvin	Owen Fitzgerald (withdrew)	Brendan Blomeley; Peter George	Stefan Popescu	
Lyons	Labor	Rebecca White*	Susie Bower	Alistair Allan	Angela Offord	Shaun Broadby	Carlo Di Falco (SFF); Sarah Graham (TOP); Michael Phibbs (ACP)

=== Victoria ===
On 27 July 2023, the Electoral Commissioner determined the number of members of the House of Representatives to be chosen in each state and territory. The seat entitlement of Victoria was reduced from thirty-nine to thirty-eight in this determination. On 5 September 2024, the Electoral Commissioner determined that the Division of Higgins will be abolished and redistributed to the divisions of Chisholm, Hotham, Kooyong, Macnamara, and Melbourne.

Table of House candidates, Victoria
Electorate	Held by	Labor	Coalition	Greens	Independent	One Nation	Other
Aston	Labor	**Mary Doyle***†	Manny Cicchiello (L)	Reuben Steen	Mark Grondman; Andrew Williams	John de Wacht	Steve Desveaux (TOP); David Fawcett (LP); Craig Manners (FFP)
Ballarat	Labor	**Catherine King***†	Paula Doran (L)	John Barnes	Luke Parker	Terri Pryse-Smith	Ian Harkness (FFP); Ryan Redfern (LP)
Bendigo	Labor	**Lisa Chesters***†	Matthew Evans (L); Andrew Lethlean (N)	Avery Barnett-Dacey	David Vincent	Heather Freeman	Matt Bansemer (LP); Evelyn Keetelaar (FFP); Wayne Taylor (LCP); Rohan Tyler (VS)
Bruce	Labor	**Julian Hill***†	Zahid Safi (L)	Rhonda Garad		Bianca Colecchia	Sam Anderson (TOP); Wendy Birchall (FFP); Andrew Louth (LCP); Christine Skrobo (LP)
Calwell	Labor	Basem Abdo*	Usman Ghani (L)	Ravneet Garcha	Carly Moore; Samim Moslih; Morgan Peach; Ravi Ragupathy; Joseph Youhana	Luay Toma	Maria Bengtsson (FFP); Gianni Del Rosario-Makridis (LCP); Bassima Hawli (ACP); Assaad Issa (TOP)
Casey	Liberal	Naomi Oakley	**Aaron Violi** (L)*†	Merran Blair	Claire Ferres Miles	Ambere Livori	Chloe Bond (AJP); Phillip Courtis (TOP); Dan Nebauer (FFP)
Chisholm	Labor	**Carina Garland***†	Katie Allen (L)	Tim Randall	Kath Davies	Guy Livori	Christine McShane (TOP); Gary Ong (FFP)
Cooper	Labor	**Ged Kearney***†	Stewart Todhunter (L)	Tara Burnett		William Turner	Kath Larkin (VS); Donna Stolzenberg (LCP)
Corangamite	Labor	**Libby Coker***†	Darcy Dunstan (L)	Mitch Pope	Kate Lockhart	Colin Seabrook	Paul Barker (LP); James Jackson (TOP); Harley Mackenzie (LCP)
Corio	Labor	**Richard Marles***†	Darren Buller (L)	Emilie Flynn	John De Lorenzo	Adam Helman	Sarah Hathway (SA)
Deakin	Liberal	Matthew Gregg*	**Michael Sukkar** (L)†	Amy Mills	Jess Ness	Anne Cooke	Richard Griffith-Jones (FFP); Will Vandermeer (LP); Milton Wilde (TOP)
Dunkley	Labor	**Jodie Belyea***†	Nathan Conroy (L)	Matt Maber	Robert Thurley	Jessica Davis	Lisa Abbott (LCP); Andrew Gatley (FUSION); Peter Nicholes (FFP)
Flinders	Liberal	Sarah Race	**Zoe McKenzie** (L)*†	Adam Frogley	Ben Smith; Joseph Toscano	Mike Brown	Jason Smart (TOP)(Withdrew)
Fraser	Labor	**Daniel Mulino***†	Satish Patel (L)	Huong Truong		George Rozario	Jasmine Duff (VS); Rob Rancie (FFP)
Gellibrand	Labor	**Tim Watts***†	Ben Reeson (L)	Ponraj Krishna Pandi		Stephen Bennett	Jo Garcia (FFP)
Gippsland	National	Alison 'Sonny' Stephens	**Darren Chester** (N)*†	Rochelle Hine		Greg Hansford	Simon Wilson (LP)
Goldstein	Independent	Nildhara Gadani	Tim Wilson (L)*	Alana Galli-McRostie	**Zoe Daniel**†	Leon Gardiner	David Segal (LP); Vicki Williams (TOP)
Gorton	Labor	Alice Jordan-Baird*	John Fletcher (L)	Thuc Bao Huynh		Alan Reid	Kathrine Ashton (FFP); Rob McCathie (LP); Xavier Menta (LCP)
Hawke	Labor	**Sam Rae***†	Simmone Cottom (L)	Sarah Newman		Matthew Katselis	Fiona Adin-James (AJP); Melanie Milutinovic (FFP); Devon Starbuck (LCP)
Holt	Labor	**Cassandra Fernando***†	Annette Samuel (L)	Payal Tiwari		Trevor Hammond	Riley Aicken (LCP); Shane Foreman (FFP)
Hotham	Labor	**Clare O'Neil***†	Harmick Singh (L)	Martin Barry		Stuart Forgarty	Mark Brown (FFP); Tony Vainoras (ACP)
Indi	Independent	Mitch Bridges	James Trenery (L)	Alysia Regan	**Helen Haines***†; Mark McFarlane	Athol Thomas	Ben Howman (LCP); Tim Quilty (LP); Michael White (FFP)
Isaacs	Labor	**Mark Dreyfus***†	Fiona Ottey (L)	Matthew Kirwan		Geoff McMahon	Audrey Harmse (FFP)
Jagajaga	Labor	**Kate Thwaites***†	Chris Parr (L)	Jy Sandford	Chris Kearney; Abdi Mohamed	Leslie Ralph	Rae Ranchie (FFP)
Kooyong	Independent	Clive Crosby	Amelia Hamer (L)	Jackie Carter	**Monique Ryan***†	Camille Brache	Richard Peppard (LP); David Vader (TOP)
La Trobe	Liberal	Jeff Springfield	**Jason Wood** (L)*†	Jamie Longmuir		Leonardo Panetta	Greg Hardiman (TOP); Ron Malhotra (FFP)
Lalor	Labor	**Joanne Ryan***†	Mira D'Silva (L)	Owen Parris	Aijaz Moinuddin	Jason Oosthuizen	Patrizia Barcatta (LP); Matthew Emerson (FFP)
Macnamara	Labor	**Josh Burns***†	Benson Saulo (L)	Sonya Semmens	JB Myers	Sean Rubin	Michael Abelman (LP)
Mallee	National	Greg Olsen	**Anne Webster** (N)*†	Nicole Rowan		Vaughan Williams	Jeff Barry (LP); Ashleigh Gray (FFP); Chris Lahy (ACP); Adam Veitch (TOP)
Maribyrnong	Labor	Jo Briskey*	Tim Beddoe (L)	James Williams		Alannah Casey	
McEwen	Labor	**Rob Mitchell***†	Jason McClintock (L)	Marley McRae McLeod		Jeremy Johnson	Ali Antoniou (PFP); Tom Forrest (LCP); Erin McGrath (FUSION); Chloe Nicolosi (AJP); Julio Valencia (FFP)
Melbourne	Greens	Sarah Witty*	Steph Hunt (L)	**Adam Bandt**†	Anthony Koutoufides; Tim Smith	Melanie Casey	Helen Huang (FUSION)
Menzies	Liberal	Gabriel Ng*	**Keith Wolahan** (L)†	Bill Pheasant	Stella Yee	Jhett Edwards-Scott	Amanda Paliouras (TOP); Ann Bown Seeley (FFP); Josh Utoyo (LP)
Monash	Independent	Tully Fletcher	Mary Aldred (L)*	Terence Steele	**Russell Broadbent**†; Deb Leonard	Kuljeet Robinson	Geoff Dethlefs (FFP); David O'Reilly (LCP); Alex Wehbe (TOP)
Nicholls	National	Kim Travers	**Sam Birrell** (N)*†	Shelby Eade		Aaron Tyrrell	Paul Bachelor (FFP); Jeff Davy (ACP); Glenn Floyd (TOP)
Scullin	Labor	**Andrew Giles***†	Rohit Taggar (L)	Loki Sangarya		Arthur Tsoutsoulis	Cassandra Bell (FFP); Adriana Buccianti (TOP); Omar Hassan (VS); Ursula van Bree (PFP)
Wannon	Liberal	Fiona McKenzie	**Dan Tehan** (L)*†	Kate Gazzard	Bernadine Atkinson; Alex Dyson	Leo Curtain	Lee-Ann Elmes (FFP); Julie McCamish (TOP); Robbie Swan (LCP)
Wills	Labor	**Peter Khalil***†	Jeff Kidney (L)	Samantha Ratnam		Bruce Stevens	Sue Bolton (SA); Margee Glover (LCP); Owen Miller (FUSION); Rachel Versteegen (LP)

=== Western Australia ===
On 27 July 2023, the Electoral Commissioner determined the number of members of the House of Representatives to be chosen in each state and territory. The seat entitlement of Western Australia was increased from fifteen to sixteen in this determination. In January 2024, a redistribution began in Western Australia. In September 2024, the AEC announced the creation of the Division of Bullwinkel, and adjusted the boundaries of the surrounding electorates. At the time of creation, Bullwinkel was notionally Labor-held based on a margin from the 2022 election estimated by psephologist Antony Green.

Table of House candidates, Western Australia
Electorate	Held by	Labor	Liberal	Greens	Independent	One Nation	Other
Brand	Labor	**Madeleine King***†	Claire Moody	Jody Freeman		Stephen Box	Jim Matters (LCP)
Bullwinkel	New seat (notional Labor)	Trish Cook*	Matt Moran	Abbey Bishop		Trevor Mayes	Mia Davies (Nat); Les Holten (AC); Penelope Young (LCP)
Burt	Labor	**Matt Keogh***†	Sean Ayres	Adam Razak	Ashok Kumar Tewatia	Liz Lerardi	Fiona Caruso (LCP); Alvin Mathew (AC)
Canning	Liberal	Jarrad Goold	**Andrew Hastie***†	Jordan Cahill		Fernando Bove	John Carey (ACP); Paul Gullan (LCP) (disendorsed)
Cowan	Labor	**Anne Aly***†	Felicia Adeniyi	Matt Count	Wade McDonald	Bradley Yates	John Bell (LCP); Wesley D'Costa (AC); Charles Smith (ToP)
Curtin	Independent	Viktor Ko	Tom White	Kitty Hemsley	**Kate Chaney***†	Alexander Ironside	Fred Mulholland (LCP)
Durack	Liberal	Karen Wheatland	**Melissa Price***†	Brendan Sturcke		Mark Berry	Eugenie Harris (AC); Jason Hunter (IAPA); Bailey Kempton (Nat); Maarten Kornaat (ToP); Kat Wright (LCP)
Forrest	Liberal	Tabitha Dowding	Ben Small*†	Georgia Beardman	Sue Chapman	Paul Van Der Mey	Peter Greenland (ToP); Cam Parsons (Nat); Aaron Peet (LCP)
Fremantle	Labor	**Josh Wilson***†	Tait Marston	Amy Warne	Kate Hulett	Hannah Marriner	John Bird (ACP); Josh Last (SA)
Hasluck	Labor	**Tania Lawrence***†	David Goode	Tamica Matson		Adrian Deeth	Dawn Kelly (GAP); David Kingston (AC); Leo Treasure (LCP)
Moore	Independent	Tom French*	Vince Connelly	Scott McCarthy	Nathan Barton; **Ian Goodenough**†	Paul Fimognari	Trevor Bartley (AC); Christopher Rennick (ToP)
O'Connor	Liberal	Darren Moir	**Rick Wilson***†	Giz Watson		Gemma Johnston	Philip Arnatt (LCP); Lindsay Cameron (ToP); Deonne Kingsford (AC); Heidi Tempra (Nat)
Pearce	Labor	**Tracey Roberts***†	Jan Norberger	Nicholas D'Alonzo		John Burton	Ramon Granados (LCP); Vanessa Montgomery (AC)
Perth	Labor	**Patrick Gorman***†	Susanna Panaia	Sophie Greer		Peter Hallifax	
Swan	Labor	**Zaneta Mascarenhas***†	Mic Fels	Clint Uink		Michael Halley	Shelley Leech (LCP); Mark Staer (AC)
Tangney	Labor	**Sam Lim***†	Howard Ong	Eric Hayward		Steve Kefalinos	Phil Leslie (LCP); James Rai (AC)

== Senate ==
In an ordinary half-Senate election, 40 of the 76 Senate seats will be up for election, six (out of twelve) in each state and all four territory seats. Parties are ordered based on ballot order in the respective state or territory.

Sitting members are listed in bold text and marked with the † symbol. Successful candidates are marked with an asterisk from the highlighted list.

=== Australian Capital Territory ===
Elected senators

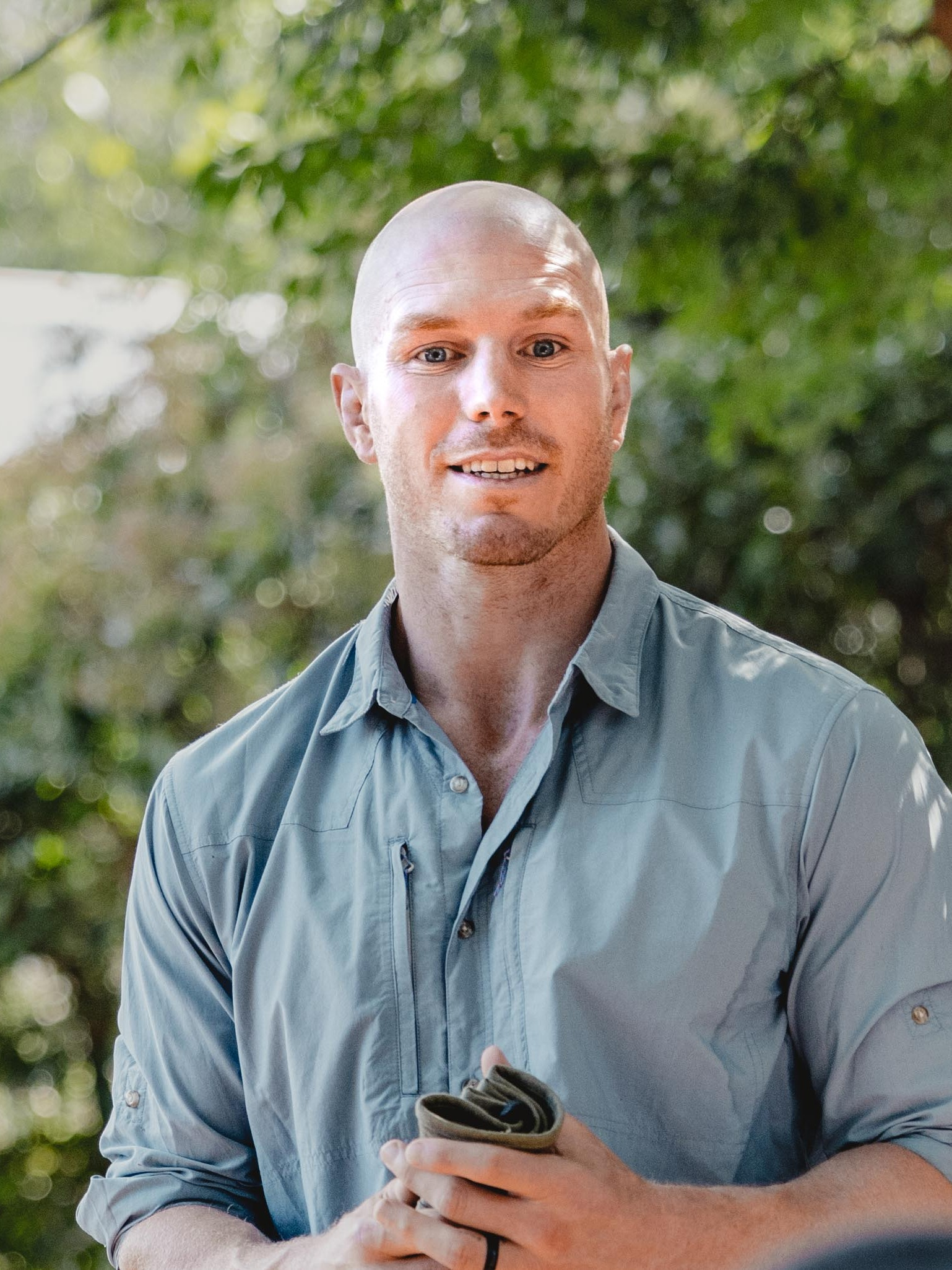
David Pocock, Independent

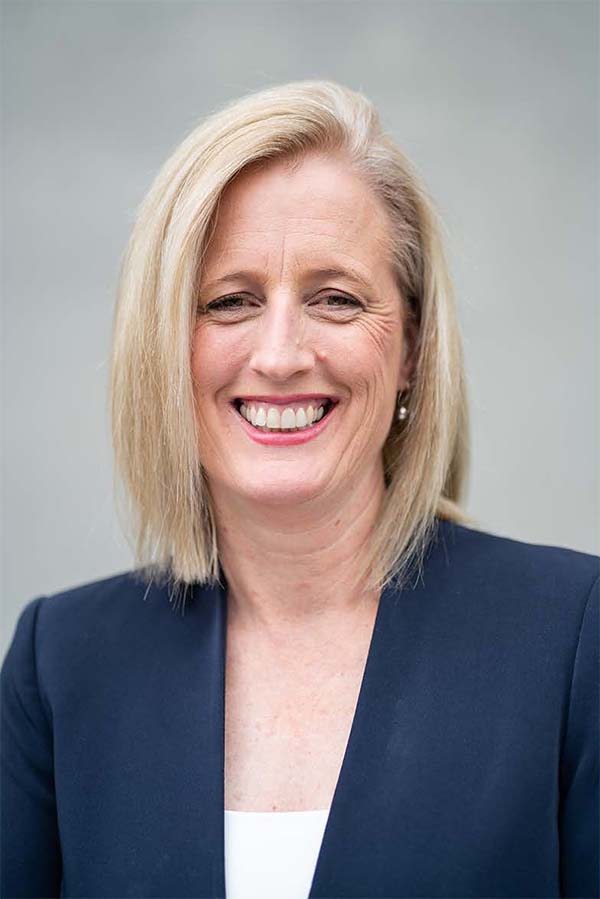
Katy Gallagher, ALP

Two seats were up for election. The Labor Party was defending one seat. Independent David Pocock (who ran for electoral purposes under his eponymous party) was defending one seat. Both incumbents were up for re-election.

**Sustainable Australia**	**David Pocock**	**Animal Justice**	**Labor**	**Liberal**	**HEART / Libertarian**
1. James Holgate; 2. John Haydon	1. **David Pocock***†; 2. Hannah Vardy	1. Robyn Soxsmith; 2. Walter Kudrycz	1. **Katy Gallagher***†; 2. Janaline Oh	1. Jacob Vadakkedathu; 2. Hayune Lee	1. Elise Searson-Prakaash (HEART); 2. Martin Brown (LP)
**Greens**
1. Christina Hobbs; 2. Jo Rocke

=== New South Wales ===
Elected senators

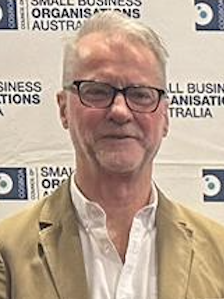
Tony Sheldon, ALP

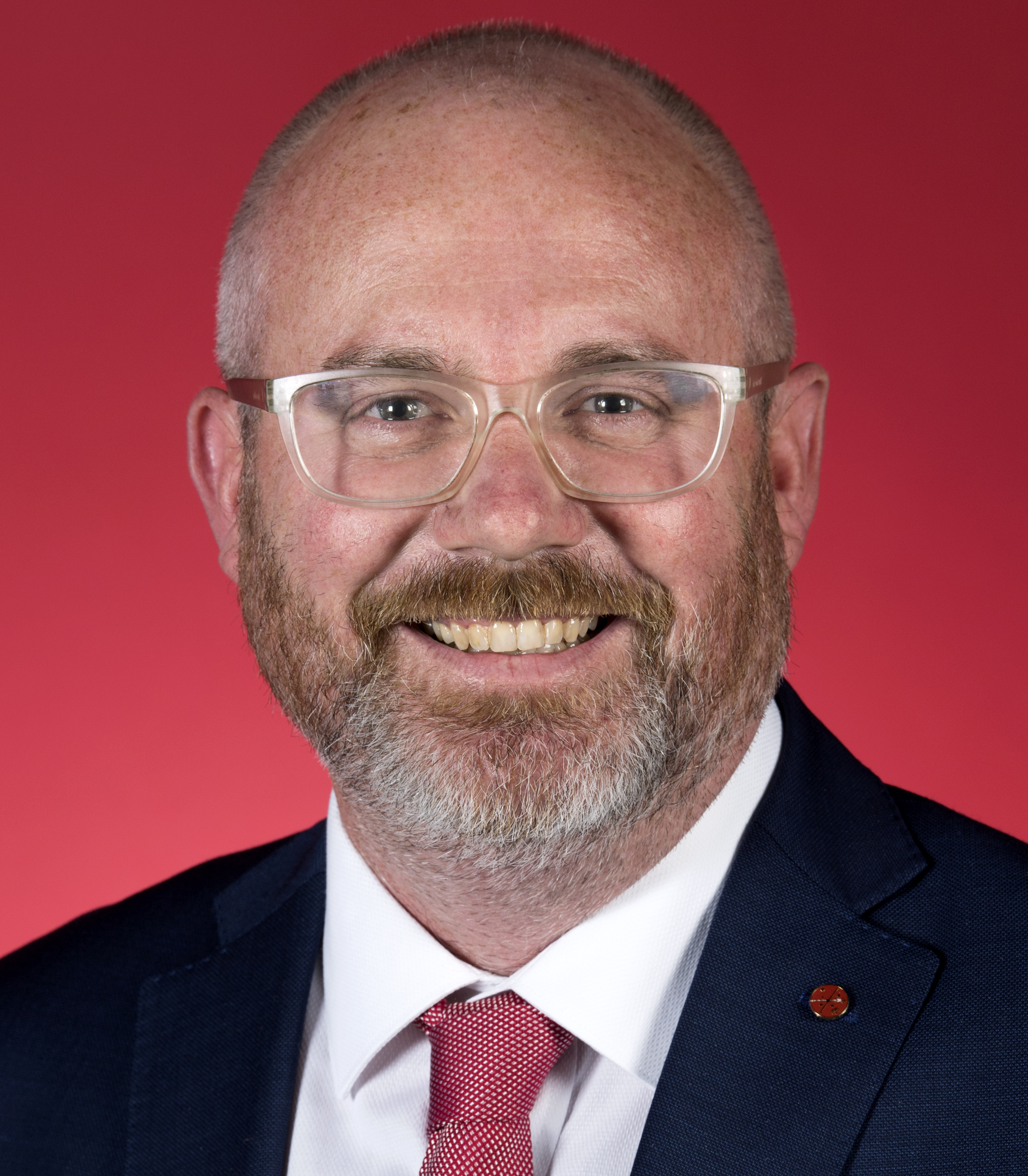
Tim Ayres, ALP

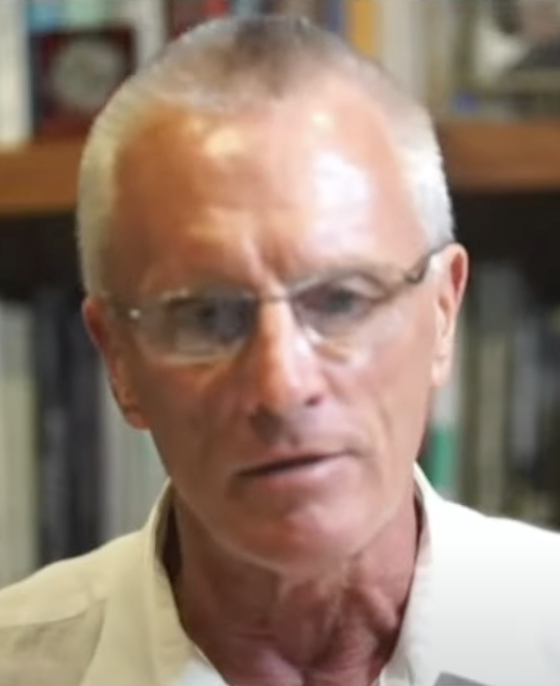
Warwick Stacey, PHON

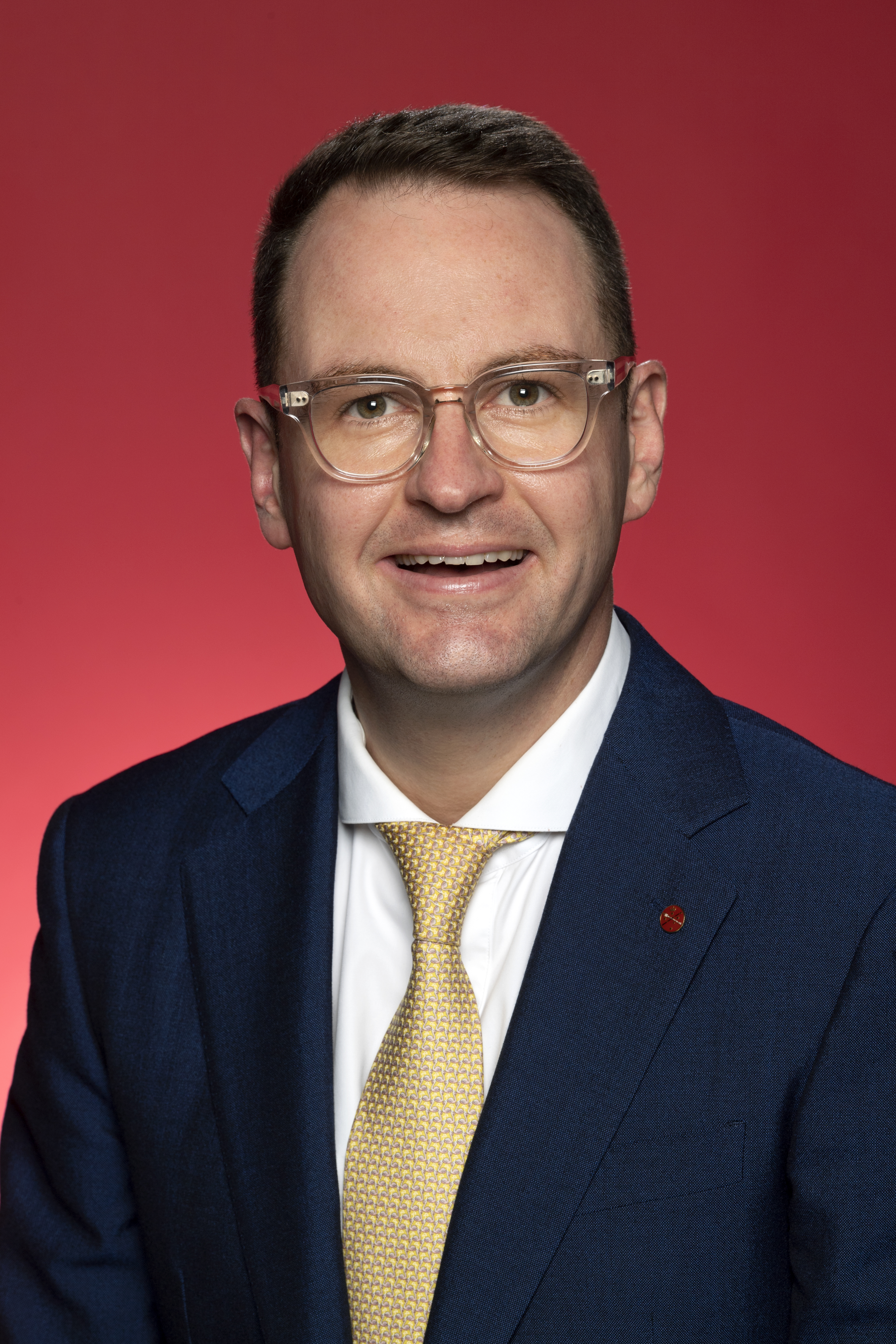
Andrew Bragg, Liberal

Jessica Collins, Liberal

Mehreen Faruqi, Greens

Six seats were up for election. The Labor Party was defending two seats. The Liberal–National coalition was defending three seats. The Greens were defending one seat. Senators Deborah O'Neill (Labor), Dave Sharma (Liberal), Ross Cadell (National), David Shoebridge (Greens), Maria Kovacic (Liberal) and Jenny McAllister (Labor) were not up for re-election.

**Labor**	**Group B (Note: Candidates in this group were endorsed by the Socialist Equality Party, which does not have registered party status but still ran candidates as independents.)**	**Australia's Voice**	**FUSION**	**Family First**	**One Nation**
1. **Tony Sheldon***†; 2. **Tim Ayres***†; 3. Emilija Beljic; 4. Victoria McGregor; 5. Sharon Sewell; 6. Heather Roarty	1. Max Boddy; 2. Warwick Dove	1. Emanie Darwiche; 2. Graham George	1. Miles Whiticker; 2. Andrew Potts	1. Lyle Shelton; 2. Roseanna Masters	1. Warwick Stacey*; 2. Rebecca Thompson
**Animal Justice**	**Christians**	**Australia First Alliance**	**Legalise Cannabis**	**Sustainable Australia**	**Indigenous-Aboriginal**
1. Emma Kerin; 2. Matt Stellino	1. Asher Wolfson; 2. Duncan Fischer	1. Craig Kelly (LP); 2. Michael O'Neill (HEART); 3. Tracy Sedman (PFP); 4. Steve Christou (LP); 5. Sonia Qutami (HEART)	1. Miles Hunt; 2. Michael Balderstone; 3. Tia Elliston	1. William Bourke; 2. Petra Campbell	1. Owen Whyman; 2. Lawrence Brooke
**Trumpet of Patriots**	**Coalition**	**Lambie Network**	**Citizens**	**Socialist Alliance**	**Greens**
1. Silvana Nile; 2. Andrew Robertson; 3. Michelle Martin	1. **Andrew Bragg** (L)*†; 2. Jessica Collins (L)*; 3. **Perin Davey** (N)†; 4. **Hollie Hughes** (L)†; 5. Juliana McArthur (N); 6. Rhiannon Brinsmead (L)	1. Glenn Kolomeitz; 2. Nikhita Sahay	1. Andy Schmulow; 2. Ann Lawler	1. Peter Boyle; 2. Andrew Chuter	1. **Mehreen Faruqi***†; 2. Eddie Lloyd; 3. Sujan Selventhiran; 4. Barbara Bloch; 5. Ethan Floyd; 6. Rachael Jacobs
**Ungrouped**
Kerrie Harris; Shawn Price; Warren Grzic

=== Northern Territory ===
Elected senators

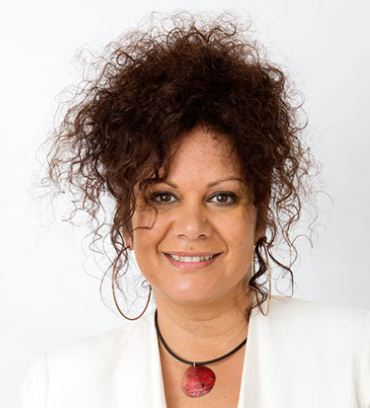
Malarndirri McCarthy, ALP

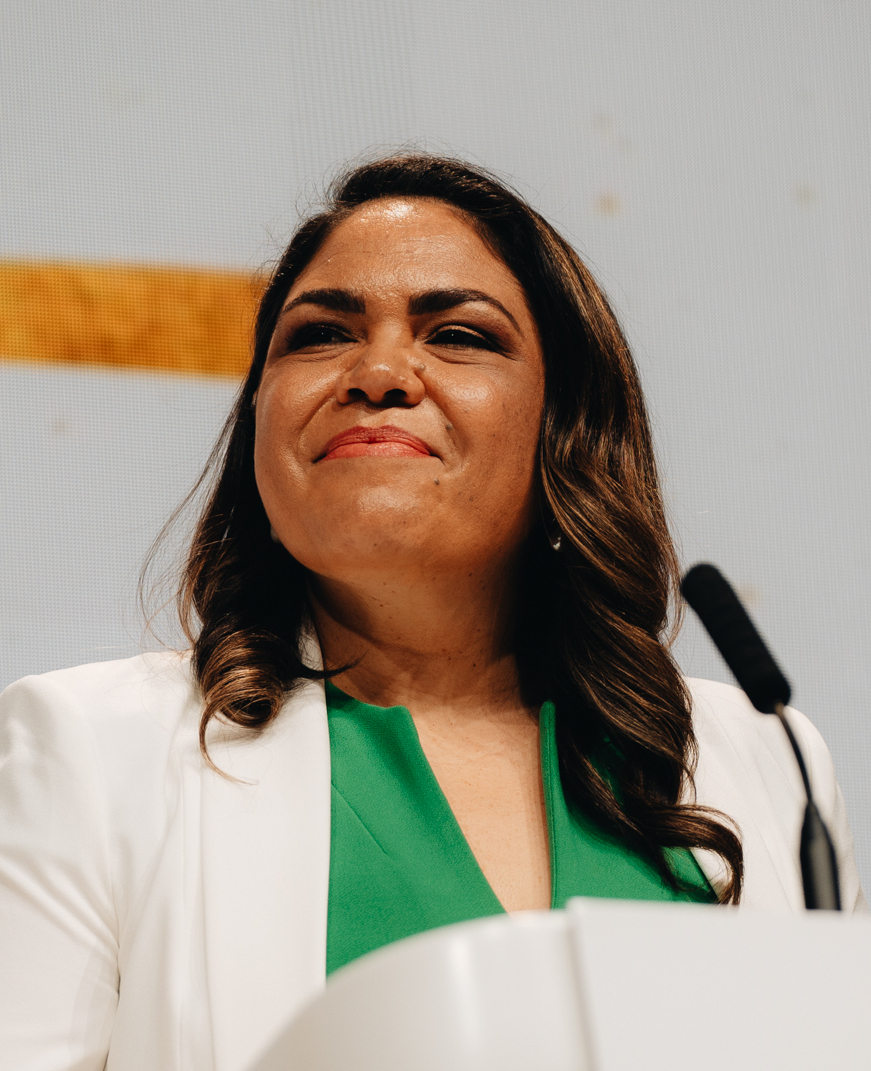
Jacinta Nampijinpa Price, CLP

Two seats were up for election. The Labor Party was defending one seat. The Country Liberal Party was defending one seat. Both incumbents were up for re-election.

**Sustainable Australia**	**Legalise Cannabis**	**Labor**	**Country Liberal**	**Greens**	**One Nation**
1. Ian Chivers; 2. Lamaan White	1. Lance Lawrence; 2. Suzette Luyken	1. **Malarndirri McCarthy***†; 2. Michael Alsop	1. **Jacinta Nampijinpa Price***†; 2. Dean Hersey	1. Aia Newport; 2. Hugo Wells	1. Darren Nugent; 2. Caine Hewes
**Citizens**	**Libertarian**	**Ungrouped**			
1. Lionel Wylie; 2. Trudy Campbell	1. Jed Hansen; 2. Trevor Smith	Que Kenny			

=== Queensland ===
Elected senators

Paul Scarr, LNP

Susan McDonald, LNP

Nita Green, ALP

Corinne Mulholland, ALP

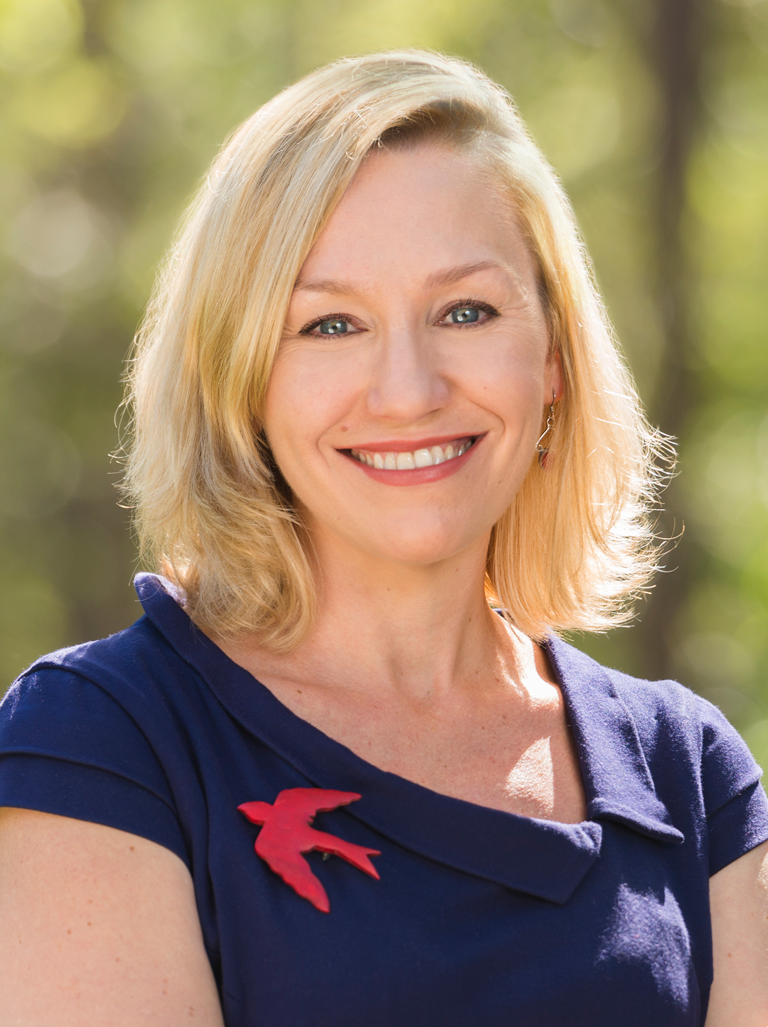
Larissa Waters, Greens

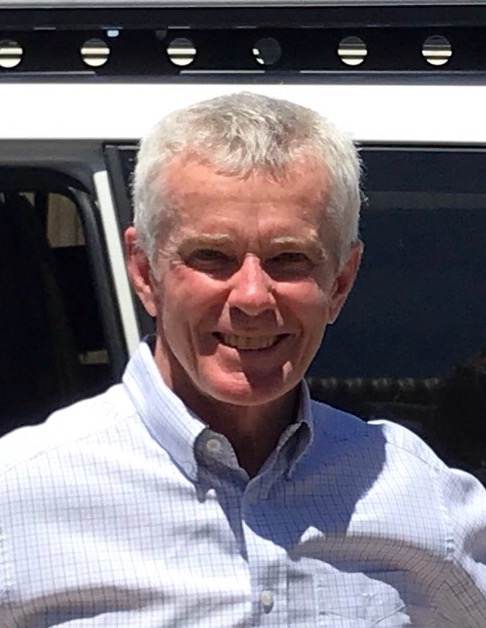
Malcolm Roberts, PHON

Six seats were up for election. The Labor Party was defending one seat. The Liberal National Party was defending two seats. The Greens were defending one seat. One Nation was defending one seat. People First Party was defending one seat. Senators Penny Allman-Payne (Greens), Anthony Chisholm (Labor), James McGrath (Liberal National), Matt Canavan (Liberal National), Pauline Hanson (One Nation) and Murray Watt (Labor) were not up for re-election.

**Socialist Alliance**	**Trumpet of Patriots**	**Indigenous-Aboriginal**	**FUSION**	**Australia's Voice**	**Lambie Network**
1. Jonathan Strauss; 2. Kamala Emanuel	1. Harry Fong; 2. Rob McMullan; 3. David McLaer	1. Wayne CoCo Wharton; 2. Marnie Laree Davis	1. Chris Simpson; 2. Frank Jordan	1. Michelle McDonald; 2. Cameron McClure Leckie; 3. Aidan McGuire	1. Angela Harper; 2. Craig Schramm
**People First / Katter's Australian**	**Democrats**	**Liberal National**	**Labor**	**Great Australian / HEART**	**Citizens**
1. **Gerard Rennick** (PFP)†; 2. Robert Lyon (KAP)	1. Scott Frazer Roberts; 2. Luke Daniel Pullar	1. **Paul Scarr***†; 2. **Susan McDonald***†; 3. Stuart Fraser; 4. Andrew Cripps; 5. Sophia Li; 6. Peter Zhuang	1. **Nita Green***†; 2. Corinne Mulholland*; 3. Peter Casey; 4. Danielle Shankey; 5. Melinda Chisholm; 6. Brianna Bailey	1. William Bay (GAP) (withdrawn); 2. Catherine Smith (HEART)	1. Jan Pukallus; 2. Richard Healy
**Animal Justice**	**Family First**	**Legalise Cannabis**	**Greens**	**One Nation**	**Sustainable Australia**
1. Michelle Jensz; 2. Gregory Dillon	1. Katie Lush; 2. Karen Fuller	1. Belinda Jones; 2. Melody Lindsay	1. **Larissa Waters***†; 2. Navdeep Singh; 3. Claire Garton; 4. Jennifer Cox; 5. Melissa McArdle; 6. Kirsten Kennedy	1. **Malcolm Roberts***†; 2. Geena Court	1. Rhett Martin; 2. Ross Honniball
**Libertarian**	**Ungrouped**				
1. Jim Willmott; 2. Lachlan Lade	Gilbert Holmes; Danny Donohue; Duke Wong; Jason Brown				

Elected senators

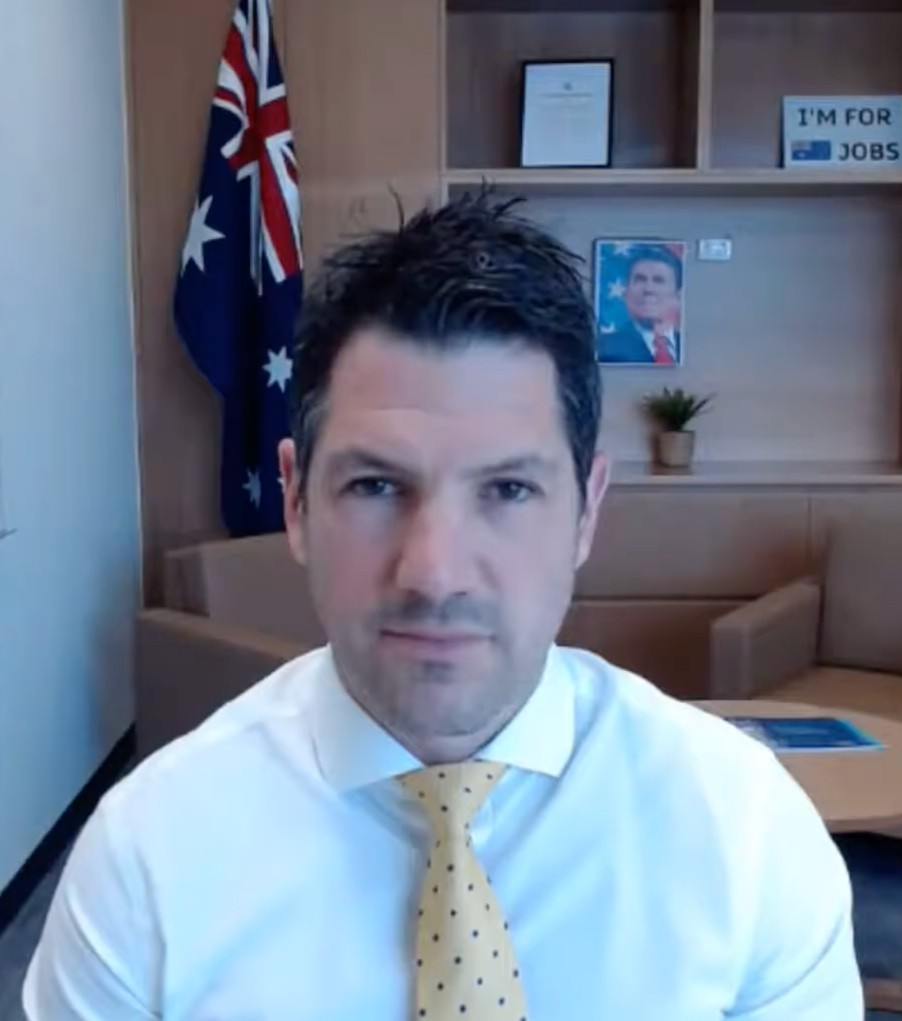
Alex Antic, Liberal

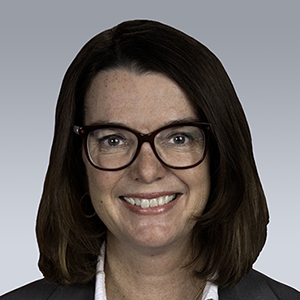
Anne Ruston, Liberal

Marielle Smith, ALP

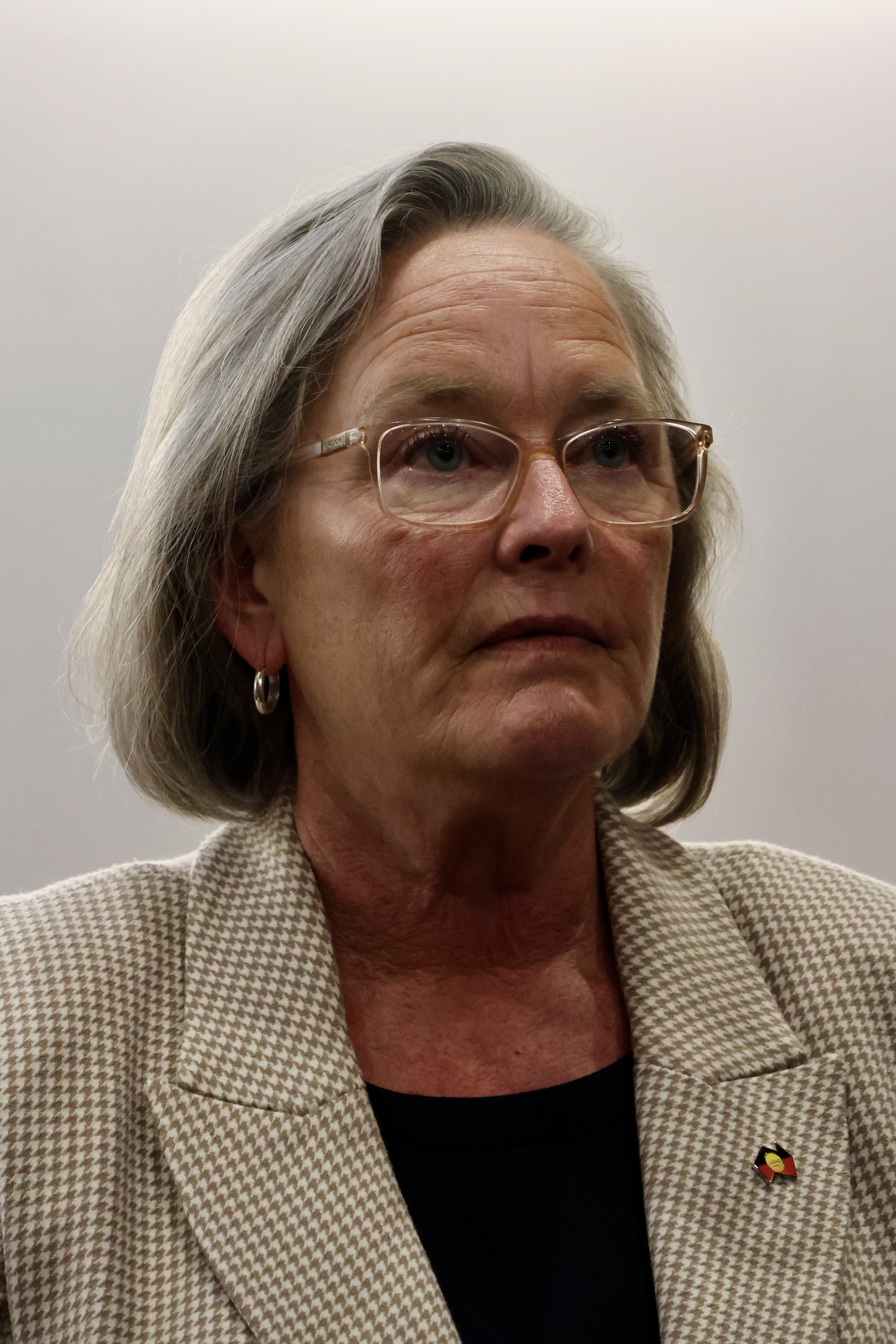
Karen Grogan, ALP

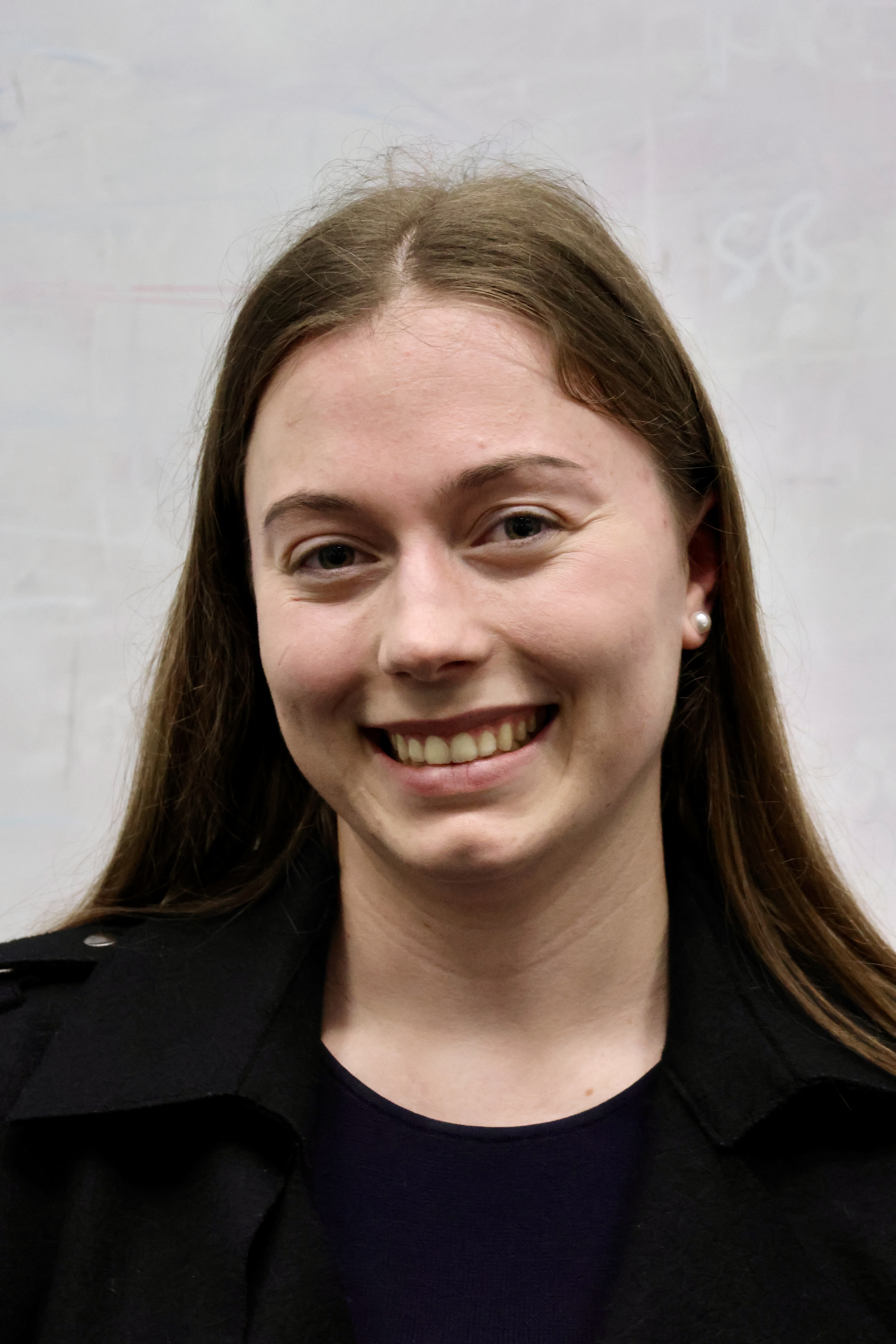
Charlotte Walker, ALP

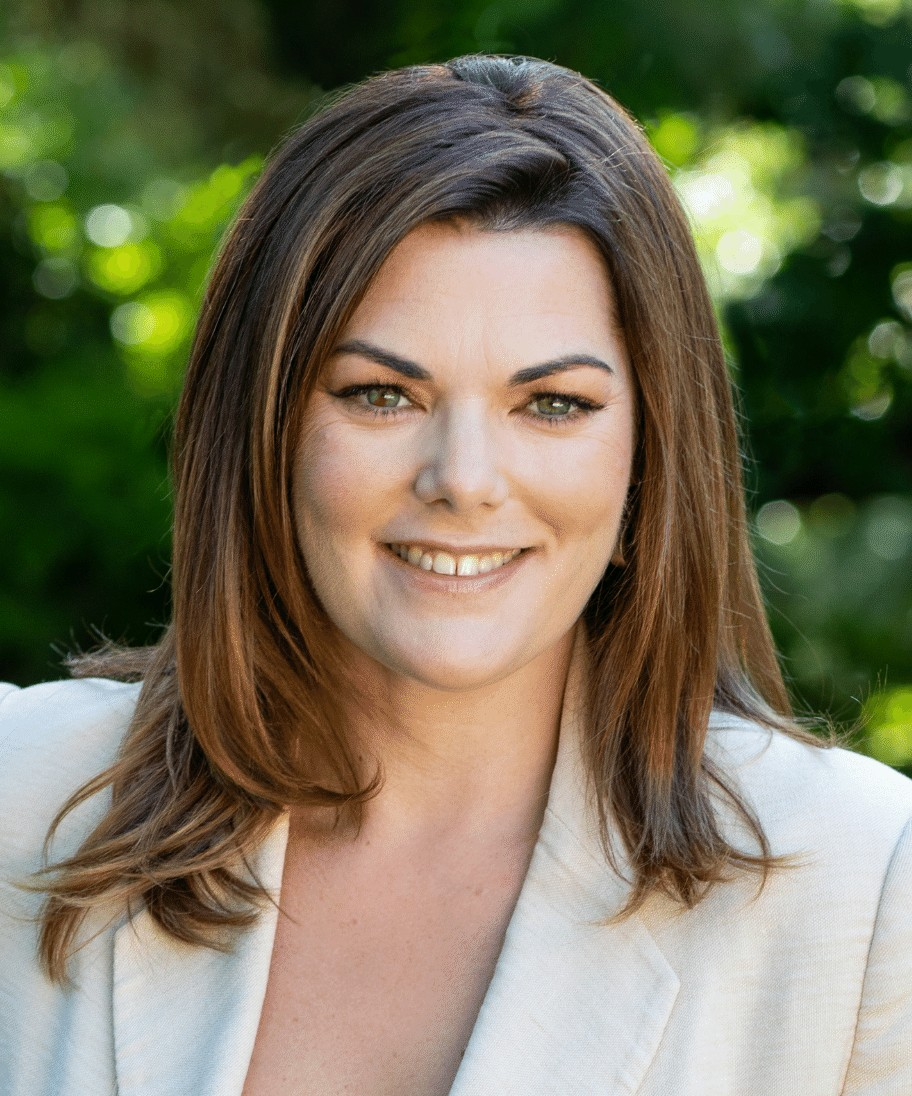
Sarah Hanson-Young, Greens

=== South Australia ===
Six seats were up for election. The Labor Party was defending two seats. The Liberal Party was defending three seats. The Greens were defending one seat. Senators Leah Blyth (Liberal), Don Farrell (Labor), Kerrynne Liddle (Liberal), Andrew McLachlan (Liberal), Barbara Pocock (Greens) and Penny Wong (Labor) were not up for re-election.

**Libertarian**	**FUSION**	**Liberal**	**Labor**	**Animal Justice**	**Lambie Network**
1. Tyler Green; 2. Jacob Van Raalte	1. Imelda Adamson Agars; 2. Drew Wolfendale	1. **Alex Antic***†; 2. **Anne Ruston***†; 3. **David Fawcett**†; 4. Damian Wyld	1. **Marielle Smith***†; 2. **Karen Grogan***†; 3. Charlotte Walker*; 4. Jennifer Allison	1. Frankie Bray; 2. Julie Pastro	1. Rex Patrick; 2. Anne Fordham
**Trumpet of Patriots**	**National**	**Australia's Voice**	**People First**	**Legalise Cannabis**	**Citizens**
1. Nicole Smeltz; 2. Bob Day; 3. Antonio Rea; 4. Matilda Bawden	1. Monique Crossling; 2. Emma Azzopardi	1. Jordan Shane; 2. Craig Nielsen	1. Robert Lonie; 2. Patrick Amadio	1. Jessica Nies; 2. Timothy Hall	1. Louise Ackland; 2. Mark Freer
**Family First**	**Greens**	**Sustainable Australia**	**One Nation**	**Ungrouped**	
1. Christopher Brohier; 2. Deepa Mathew	1. **Sarah Hanson-Young***†; 2. Noah Schultz-Byard	1. Madeleine Wearne; 2. Michael Dwyer	1. Jennifer Game; 2. Carlos Quaremba	Kosta Hadjimarkou; Janette Francis	

=== Tasmania ===
Elected senators

Claire Chandler, Liberal

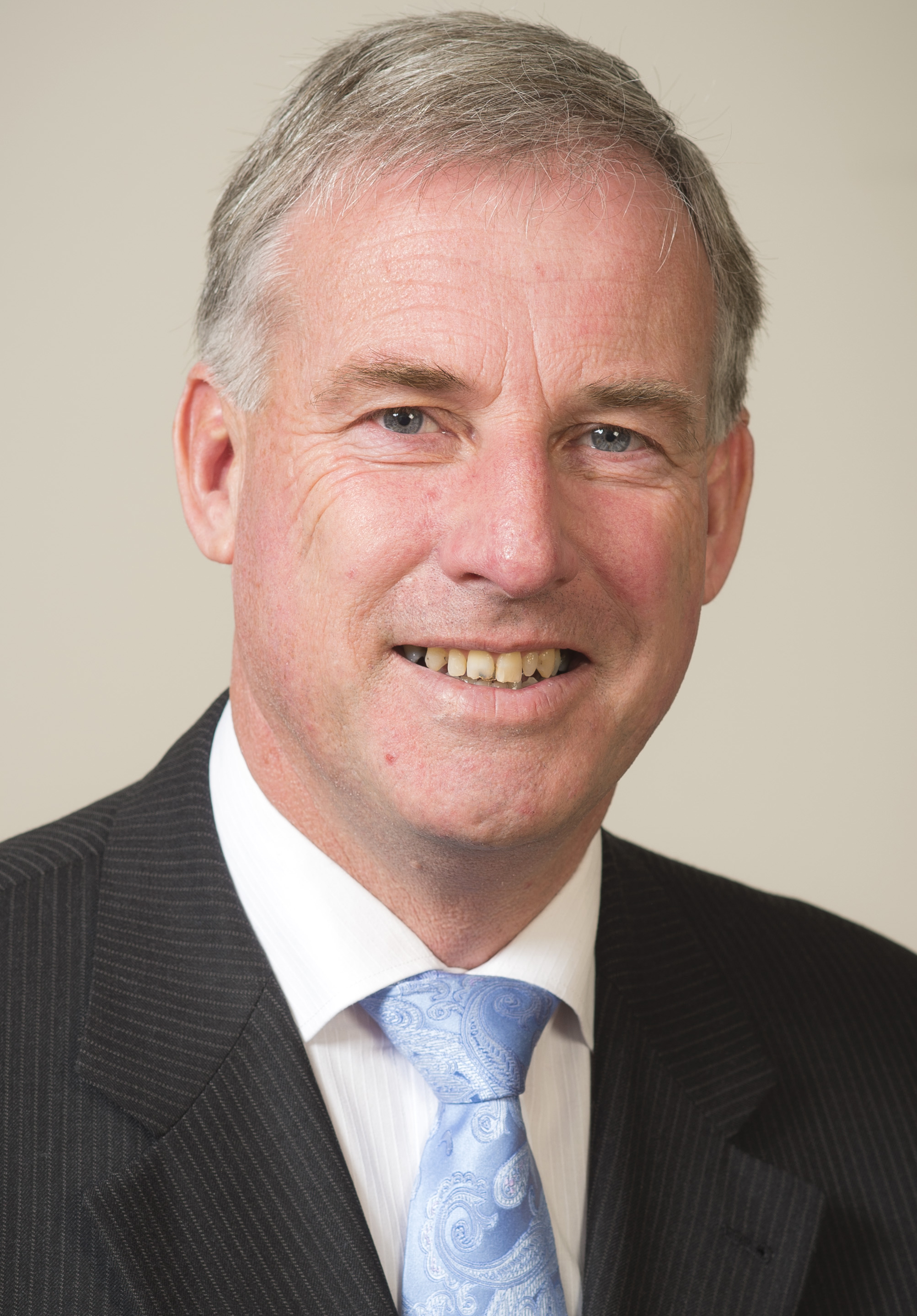
Richard Colbeck, Liberal

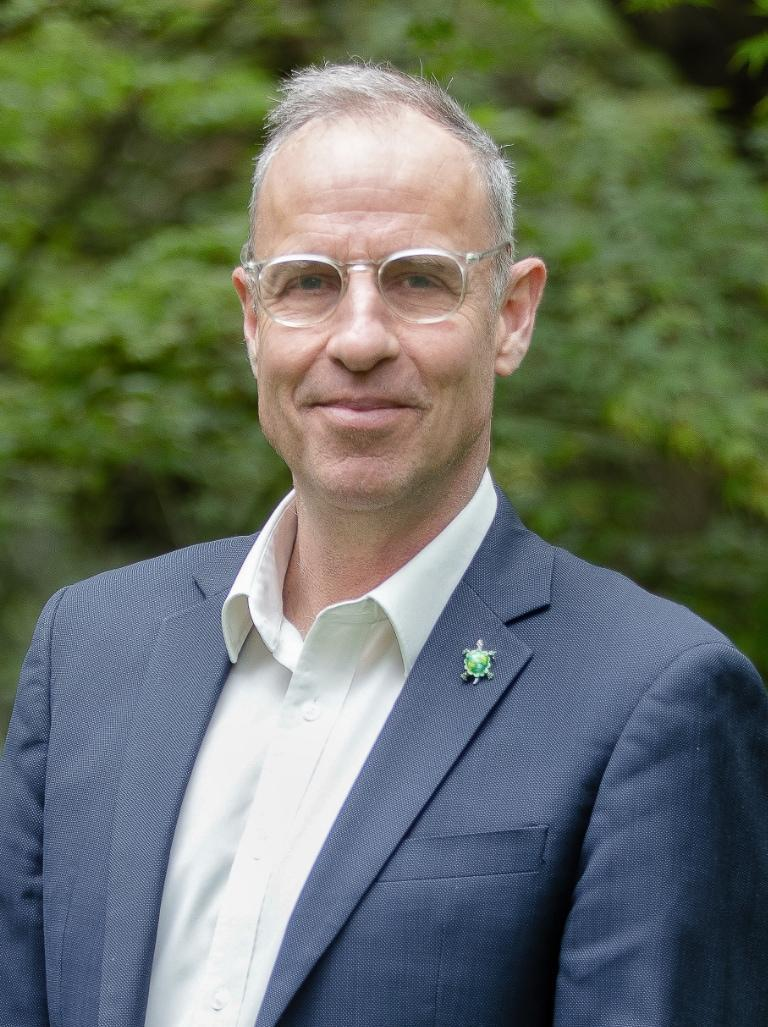
Nick McKim, Greens

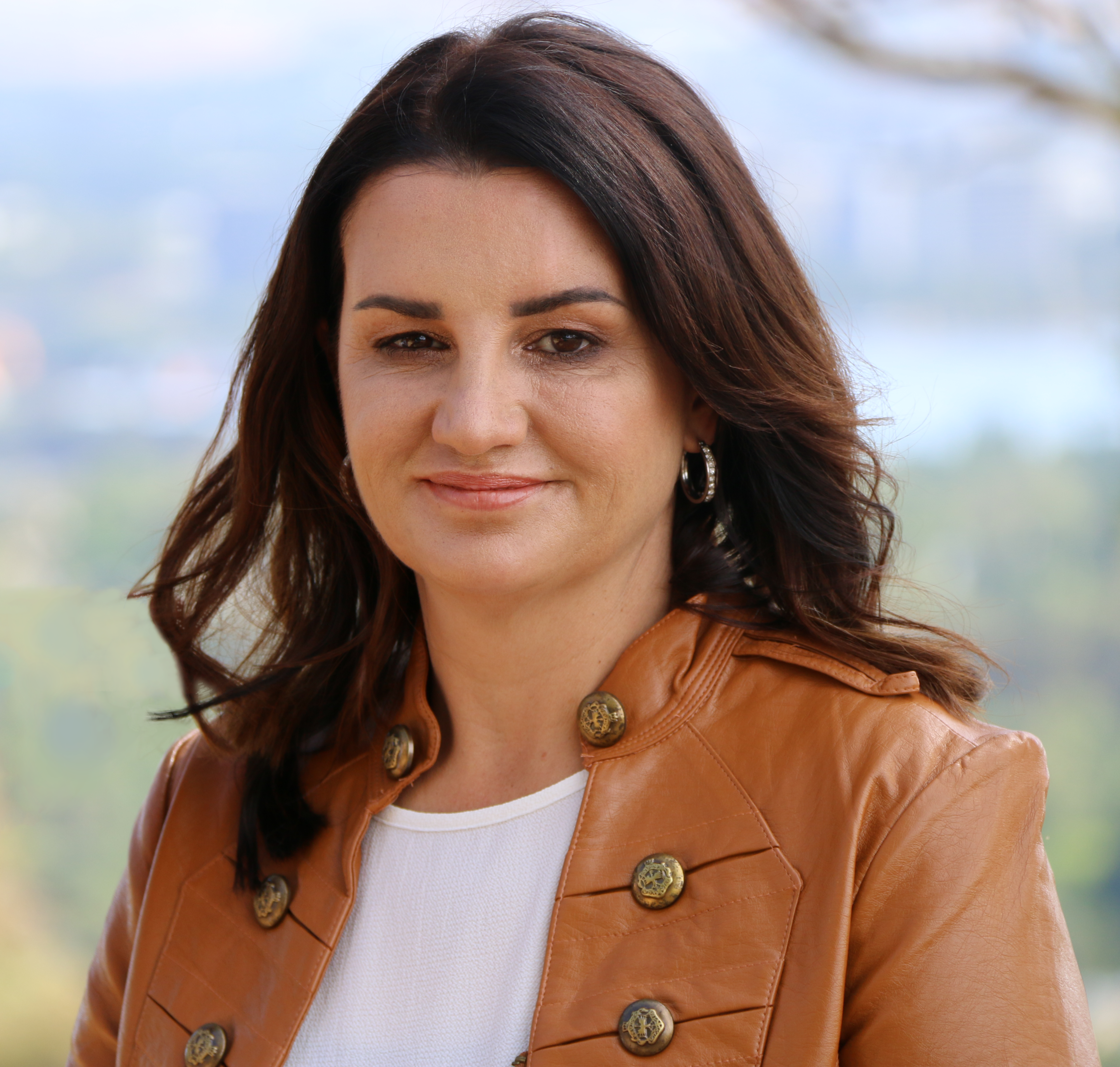
Jacqui Lambie, JLN

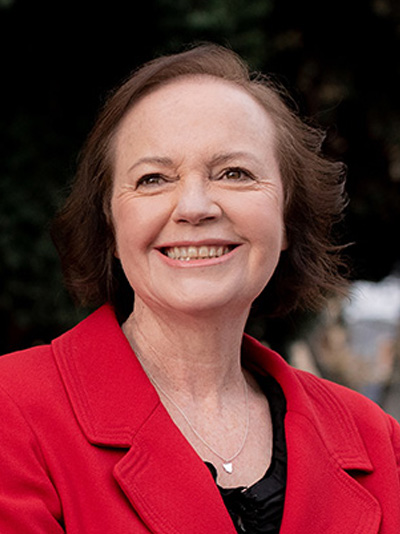
Carol Brown, ALP

Richard Dowling, ALP

Six seats were up for election. The Labor Party was defending two seats. The Liberal Party was defending two seats. The Greens were defending one seat. The Jacqui Lambie Network was defending one seat. Wendy Askew (Liberal), Jonathon Duniam (Liberal), Helen Polley (Labor), Anne Urquhart (Labor), Tammy Tyrrell (independent) and Peter Whish-Wilson (Greens) were not up for re-election.

**Sustainable Australia**	**Liberal**	**Trumpet of Patriots**	**Legalise Cannabis**	**Animal Justice**	**Greens**
1. Dennis Bilic; 2. Pierre Richardson	1. **Claire Chandler***†; 2. **Richard Colbeck***†; 3. Jacki Martin	1. Wayne Moore; 2. Matt Kelly; 3. Greg Smith	1. Matt Owen; 2. Gail Hester	1. Casey Davies; 2. Kate Lucas	1. **Nick McKim***†; 2. Vanessa Bleyer; 3. Scott Jordan; 4. Trenton Hoare
**Lambie Network**	**Libertarian**	**One Nation**	**Citizens**	**Labor**	**Shooters, Fishers & Farmers**
1. **Jacqui Lambie***†; 2. Christine Hannan	1. Chrysten Abraham; 2. Nicole Armstrong	1. Lee Hanson; 2. James Dunn	1. Daryl Staggard; 2. Ray Williams	1. **Carol Brown***†; 2. Richard Dowling*; 3. Bailey Falls; 4. Saxon O'Donnell; 5. Greg Luckman; 6. Amelia Meyers	1. Phillip Bigg; 2. Melanie Roach
**Ungrouped**
Fenella Edwards

=== Victoria ===
Elected senators

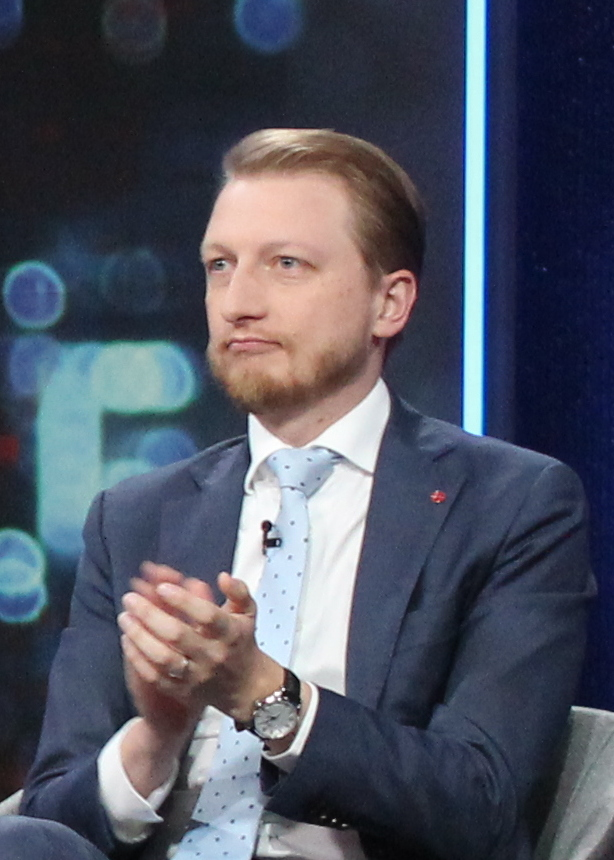
James Paterson, Liberal

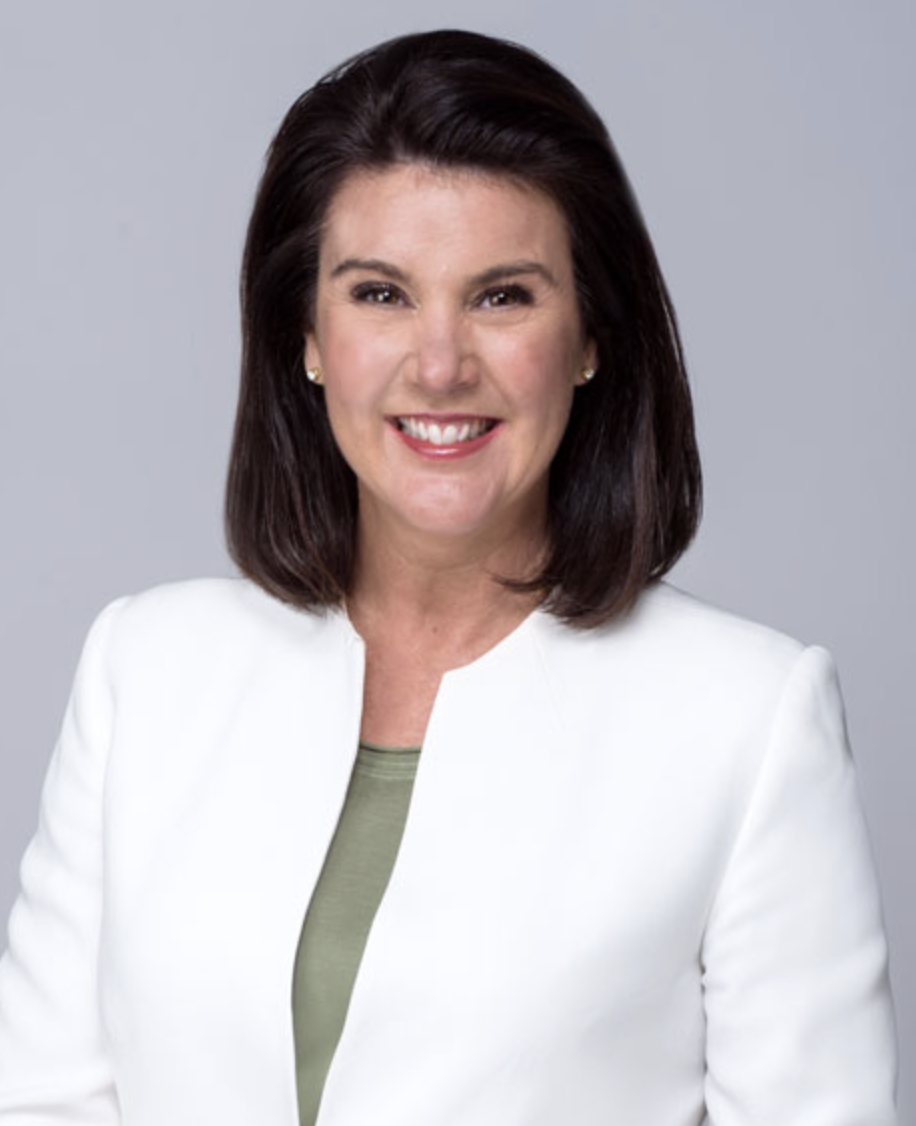
Jane Hume, Liberal

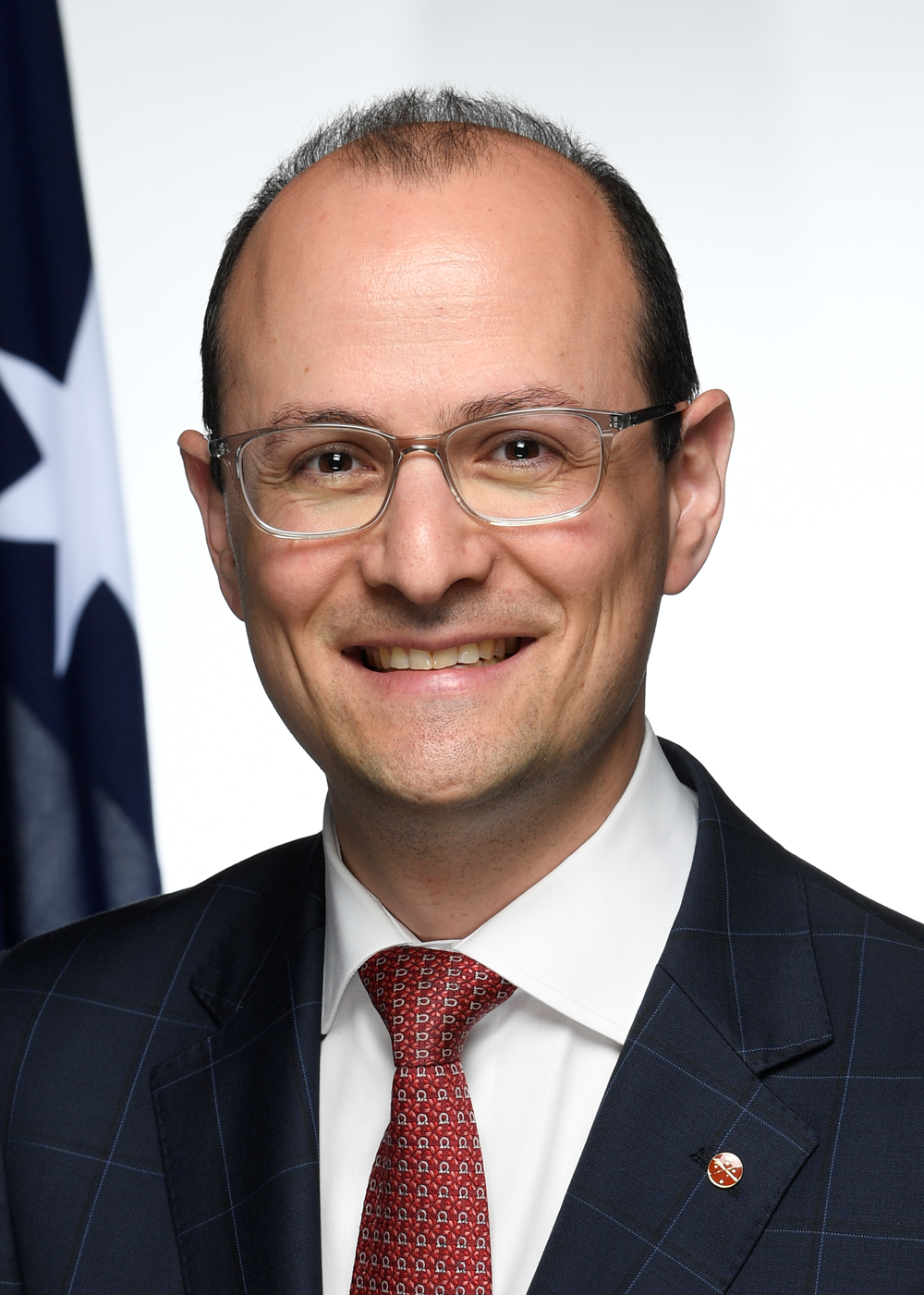
Raff Ciccone, ALP

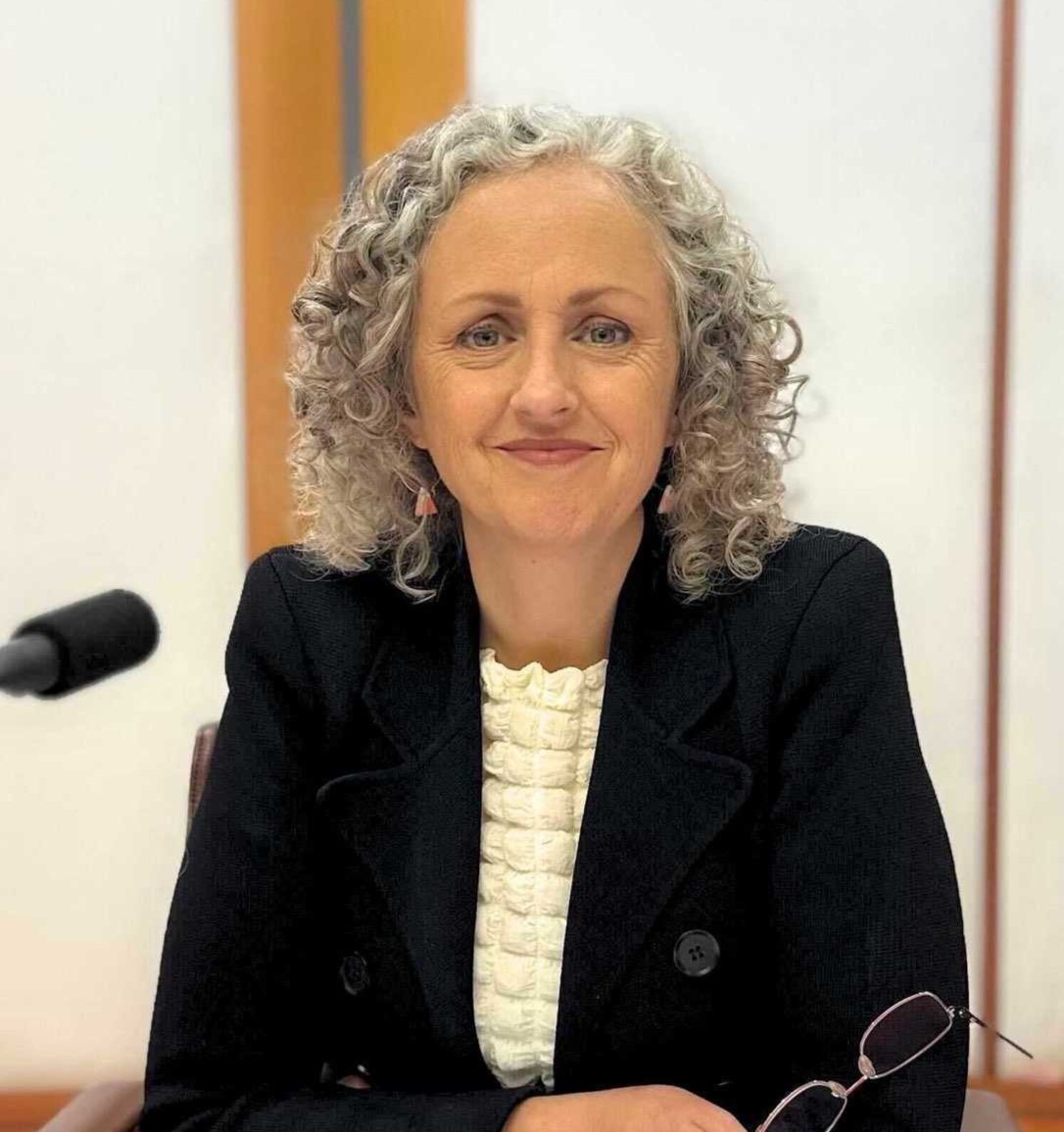
Jess Walsh, ALP

Michelle Ananda-Rajah, ALP

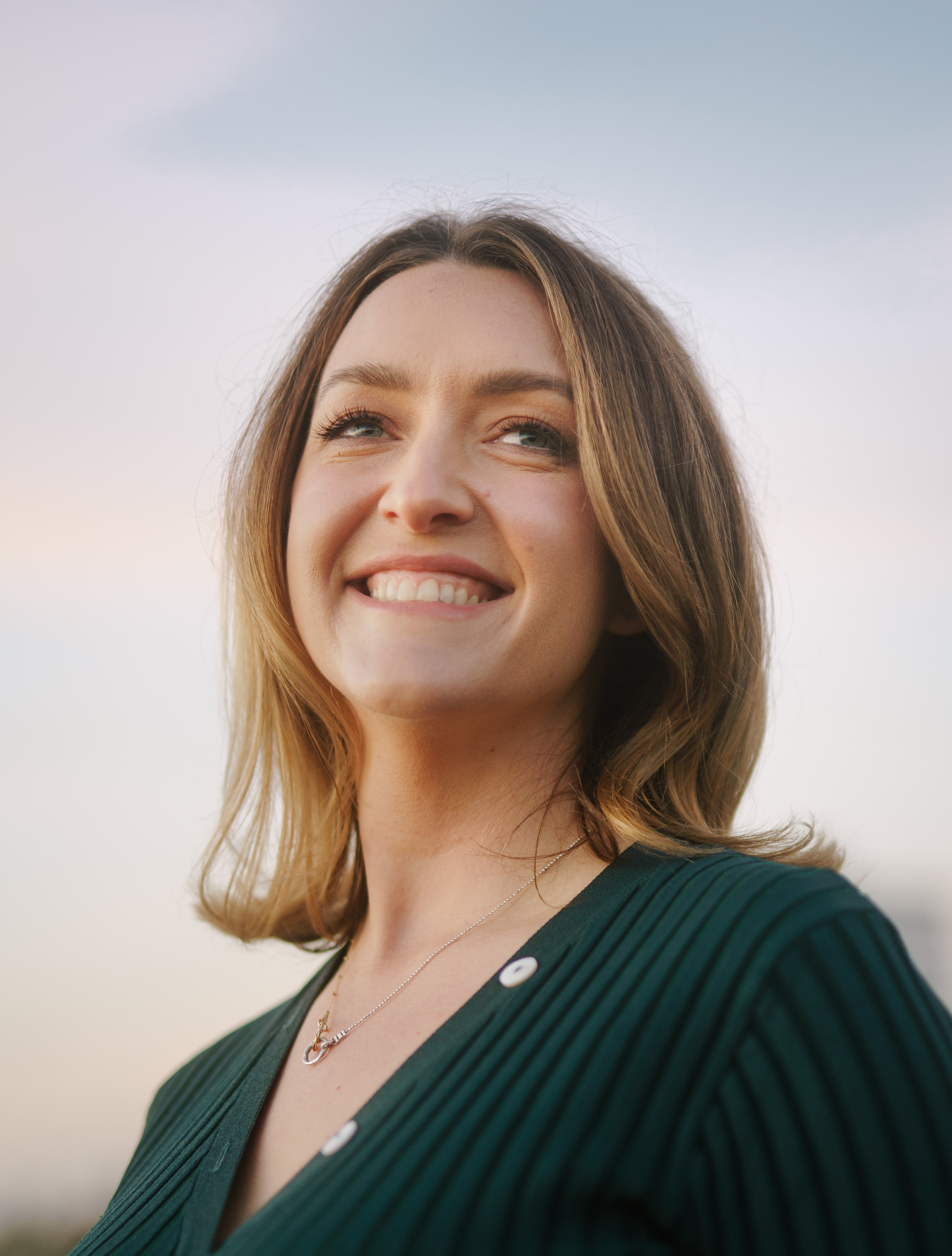
Steph Hodgins-May, Greens

Six seats were up for election. The Labor Party was defending two seats. The Liberal–National coalition was defending two seats. The Greens were defending one seat. Independent David Van was defending one seat. Ralph Babet (UAP), Sarah Henderson (Liberal), Bridget McKenzie (National), Jana Stewart (Labor), Lisa Darmanin (Labor) and Lidia Thorpe (independent) were not up for re-election.

**Coalition**	**Legalise Cannabis**	**Animal Justice**	**Indigenous-Aboriginal**	**Australia's Voice**	**FUSION**
1. **James Paterson** (L)*†; 2. **Jane Hume** (L)*†; 3. Kyle Hoppitt (L); 4. Glenn Arnold (N); 5. Greg Mirabella (L); 6. Chrestyna Kmetj (L)	1. Fiona Patten; 2. Alice Davy; 3. Shea Evans	1. Helen Jeges; 2. Benjamin McMillan	1. Racquel Austin-Abdullah; 2. Laylah Al-Saimary	1. Mohamed El-Masri; 2. Harsimran Kaur; 3. Rasheed El Achkar	1. Kammy Cordner-Hunt; 2. Simon Gnieslaw
**Group G**	**Trumpet of Patriots**	**Labor**	**Family First**	**One Nation**	**Democrats**
1. Keo Vongvixay; 2. Taylor Hernan	1. James Unkles; 2. Ronald Jean; 3. Roger Ivan McKay	1. **Raff Ciccone***†; 2. **Jess Walsh***†; 3. Michelle Ananda-Rajah*; 4. Lynn Psaila; 5. Stephenie Kelley; 6. David Baker	1. Bernie Finn; 2. Jane Foreman	1. Warren Pickering; 2. Christopher Bradbury	1. Heath McKenzie; 2. Carly Noble
**Victorian Socialists**	**Sustainable Australia**	**People First / HEART**	**Libertarian**	**Greens**	**Citizens**
1. Jordan van den Lamb; 2. Steph Price	1. Celeste Ackerly; 2. Bert Jessup	1. Chris Neil (PFP); 2. Nick Clonaridis (HEART)	1. Jordan Dittloff; 2. Matt Ford; 3. Stephen Matulec	1. **Steph Hodgins-May***†; 2. Navera Ari; 3. Rachel Iampolski; 4. Maddie Slater; 5. Brittney Henderson; 6. Nasser Yawari	1. Robert Barwick; 2. Sleiman Yohanna
**Shooters, Fishers & Farmers**	**Group T**	**Ungrouped**			
1. Ethan Constantinou; 2. Ken Vickers	1. Raj Saini; 2. Kirti Alle; 3. Yashaswini Srinivas Kanakagiri	Heena Sinha Cheung; Susantha Abeysinghe; Viesha Lewand; Lawrence Harvey; Cory Corbett; K Black; **David Van**†; Nate Ritter			

=== Western Australia ===
Elected senators

Jordon Steele-John, Greens

Ellie Whiteaker, ALP

Varun Ghosh, ALP

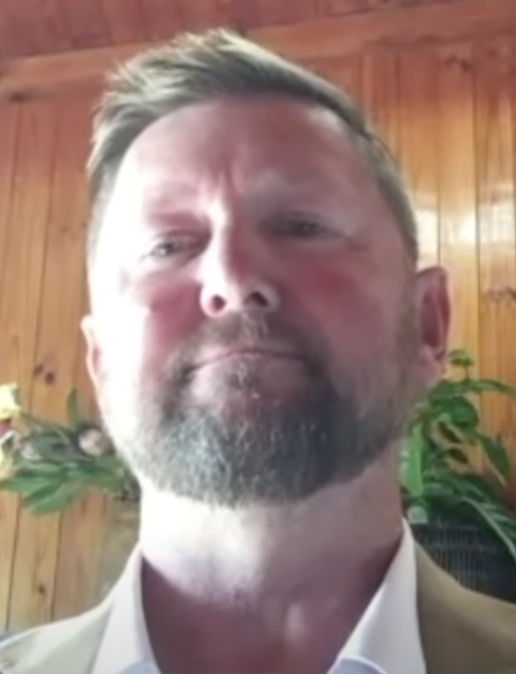
Tyron Whitten, PHON

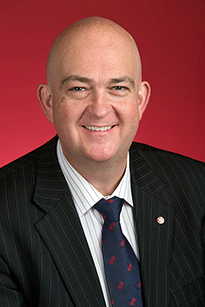
Slade Brockman, Liberal

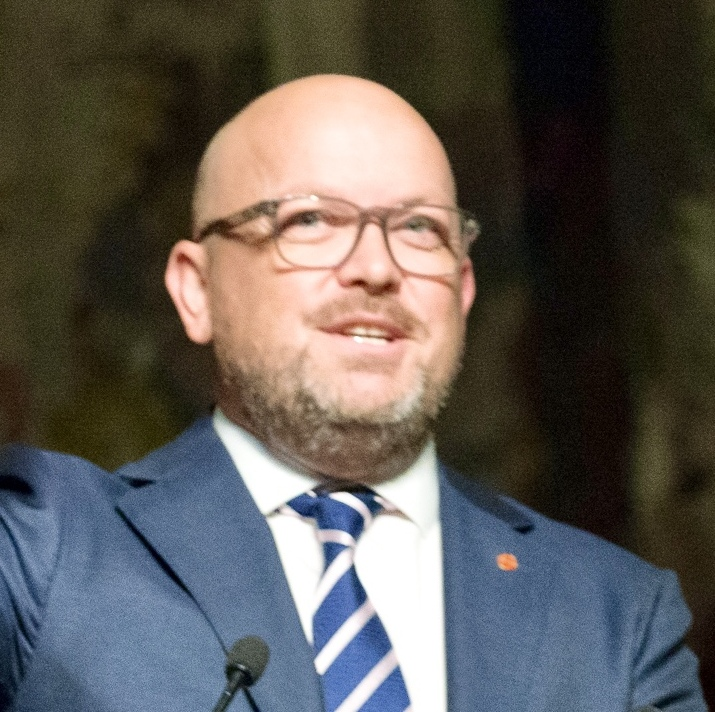
Matt O'Sullivan, Liberal

Six seats were up for election. The Labor Party was defending two seats. The Liberal Party was defending three seats. The Greens were defending one seat. Michaelia Cash (Liberal), Dorinda Cox (Greens), Sue Lines (Labor), Fatima Payman (Australia's Voice), Dean Smith (Liberal) and Glenn Sterle (Labor) were not up for re-election.

**Great Australian**	**Christians**	**Citizens**	**Trumpet of Patriots**	**Sustainable Australia**	**Democrats**
1. Rodney Cullerton (Note: While 'Culleton' is the correct spelling of his name, a typo in his nomination documents led to 'Cullerton' being listed on the ballot.); 2. William Newton-Wordsworth	1. Steve Klomp; 2. Joan Lee Ng	1. Aisha Nancy Novakovich; 2. Rex Ryles	1. Melissa Bannister; 2. Trent Kenneth Mongan; 3. Peter Robbins; 4. Lincoln Stewart (withdrawn)	1. Karen Oborn; 2. Ryan Oostryck	1. Elana Mitchell; 2. Simon Simson
**Libertarian**	**People First**	**Greens**	**FUSION**	**Socialist Alliance**	**Labor**
1. Ryan Burns; 2. Gary Nicol	1. Madison King; 2. Jody Clune	1. **Jordon Steele-John***†; 2. Simone Collins; 3. Donald Clarke; 4. Verity Ives; 5. Heather Lonsdale	1. Tian Carrie-Wilson; 2. Tamara Alderdice	1. Jade "Nova" Sobieralski; 2. Riley Breen	1. Ellie Whiteaker*; 2. **Varun Ghosh***†; 3. Deep Singh; 4. Tarun Dewan; 5. Ally White; 6. Brock Oswald
**One Nation**	**Legalise Cannabis**	**Animal Justice**	**Australia's Voice**	**Liberal**	**National**
1. Tyron Whitten*; 2. Conor Doyle	1. Jason Meotti; 2. Melissa Rose D'Ath	1. Michael Anagno; 2. Grant Stewart	1. Megan Krakouer; 2. Tano La Macchia	1. **Slade Brockman***†; 2. **Matt O'Sullivan***†; 3. Trisha Botha; 4. Jennifer Matthews	1. Paul Brown; 2. Jeremy Miles
**Ungrouped**
Ky Cao; Kim Mubarak

== Summary by party ==
Beside each party is the number of seats contested by that party in the House of Representatives for each state, as well as an indication of whether the party contested the Senate election in the respective state.

Table of number of seats contested by party in each state
Party	NSW		Vic		Qld		WA		SA		Tas		ACT		NT		Total	
Party	HR	S	HR	S	HR	S	HR	S	HR	S	HR	S	HR	S	HR	S	HR	S
Australian Labor Party	46	6	38	6	30	6	16	6	10	4	5	6	3	2	2	2	150	38
Liberal Party of Australia	37	4	35	5	—	—	16	4	10	4	5	3	3	2	—	—	106	22
Liberal National Party of Queensland	—	—	—	—	30	6	—	—	—	—	—	—	—	—	—	—	30	6
Country Liberal Party (NT)	—	—	—	—	—	—	—	—	—	—	—	—	—	—	2	2	2	2
National Party of Australia	9	2	4	1	—	—	4	2	2	2	—	—	—	—	—	—	19	7
Australian Greens	46	6	38	6	30	6	16	5	10	2	5	4	3	2	2	2	150	33
Pauline Hanson's One Nation	46	2	38	2	30	2	16	2	10	2	5	2	—	—	2	2	147	14
Trumpet of Patriots	35	3	17	3	30	3	5	4	10	4	3	3	—	—	—	—	100	20
Family First Party	25	2	27	2	30	2	—	—	9	2	—	—	1	0	—	—	92	8
Libertarian Party	25	2	16	3	5	2	0	2	0	2	0	2	0	1	0	2	46	16
Legalise Cannabis Australia	10	3	14	3	5	2	13	2	0	2	0	2	—	—	0	2	42	16
Australian Citizens Party	6	2	4	2	3	2	2	2	0	2	2	2	—	—	2	2	19	14
Gerard Rennick People First	2	1	2	1	15	1	0	2	0	2	—	—	—	—	—	—	19	7
Animal Justice Party	5	2	3	2	4	2	0	2	5	2	0	2	1	2	—	—	18	14
Fusion Party	4	2	4	2	2	2	0	2	3	2	—	—	—	—	—	—	13	10
Australian Christians	0	2	—	—	—	—	10	2	—	—	—	—	—	—	—	—	10	4
Shooters, Fishers and Farmers Party	7	0	0	2	—	—	—	—	—	—	1	2	—	—	—	—	8	4
Socialist Alliance	2	2	2	0	1	2	1	2	—	—	—	—	—	—	—	—	6	6
HEART Party	3	2	0	1	0	1	—	—	—	—	—	—	1	1	—	—	4	5
Victorian Socialists	—	—	4	2	—	—	—	—	—	—	—	—	—	—	—	—	4	2
Indigenous-Aboriginal Party of Australia	1	2	0	2	0	2	1	0	—	—	—	—	—	—	1	0	3	6
Katter's Australian Party	—	—	—	—	3	1	—	—	—	—	—	—	—	—	—	—	3	1
Australian Democrats	1	0	0	2	0	2	0	2	—	—	—	—	—	—	—	—	1	6
The Great Australian Party	—	—	—	—	0	1	1	2	—	—	—	—	—	—	—	—	1	3
Centre Alliance	—	—	—	—	—	—	—	—	1	0	—	—	—	—	—	—	1	0
Sustainable Australia	0	2	0	2	0	2	0	2	0	2	0	2	0	2	0	2	0	16
Australia's Voice	0	2	0	3	0	3	0	2	0	2	—	—	—	—	—	—	0	12
Jacqui Lambie Network	0	2	—	—	0	2	—	—	0	2	0	2	—	—	—	—	0	8
David Pocock	—	—	—	—	—	—	—	—	—	—	—	—	0	2	—	—	0	2
Independents and others	56	5	32	13	20	4	7	2	7	2	6	1	2	0	2	1	132	28
Total	366	56	278	65	238	56	108	49	77	40	32	33	14	14	13	17	1,126	330

=== Unregistered parties and groups ===
- The Socialist Equality Party ran for the Senate as Group B in New South Wales and Group G in Victoria. They also endorsed candidates for the seats of Calwell (Morgan Peach), Newcastle (Robert Creech) and Oxley (Mike Head) in the House of Representatives.
- The Good Party endorsed candidates for the seats of Kingsford Smith (Elsa Parker) and Page (Jordan Colless) in the House of Representatives.
- The Australia First Party endorsed candidate Jim Saleam for the seat of Lindsay in the House of Representatives.
- Public Interests Before Corporate Interests endorsed candidate Joseph Toscano for the seat of Flinders in the House of Representatives.
- The United People's Party endorsed candidate Aijaz Moinuddin for the seat of Lalor in the House of Representatives.

== Disendorsements and resignations ==
Candidates who resigned or were disendorsed as candidates after the close of nominations (10 April 2025) were still listed as a candidate of their party on the ballot paper.

Table showing candidates who resigned or were disendorsed
Date	Party	Candidate	Seat	Details
20 May 2024	Liberal	Mark Wales	Tangney	Resigned due to family illness.
28 Jul 2024	Liberal	Anthony Richardson	Isaacs	Resigned due to a "change in personal circumstances".
5 Sep 2024	Liberal	Katie Allen	Higgins	Division abolished. Later preselected to run for Chisholm.
5 Sep 2024	Greens	Angelica Di Camillo	Higgins	Division abolished.
8 Sep 2024	Liberal	Theo Zographos	Chisholm	Lost preselection to Katie Allen after nominations for the seat were re-opened due to substantial changes in the AEC redistribution.
12 Sep 2024	Liberal	Gisele Kapterian	North Sydney	Division abolished. Later preselected to run for Bradfield.
21 Nov 2024	Greens	Jy Sandford	Jagajaga	Preselection overturned after breach of party's by-laws during initial voting process. Sandford was reinstated as the candidate for Jagajaga on 23 December 2024 after a second round of preselection.
10 Dec 2024	Liberal	Paul Fletcher	Bradfield	Selected as candidate in July 2024, but announced retirement from politics in December 2024.
17 Dec 2024	Victorian Socialists	Omar Hassan	Calwell	Party chose not to contest seat because voters were "spoilt for choice with a number of strong candidates on the left".
20 Feb 2025	Greens	Lauren Green	Wannon	Withdrew candidacy due to section 44 concerns.
26 Feb 2025	Democrats	Chris Simpson	Senate (Queensland)	Disendorsed
28 Feb 2025	Greens	Mohamed El-Masri	Calwell	Withdrew candidacy and resigned from party to contest Senate as Australia's Voice lead candidate.
6 Mar 2025	Democrats	Tom Tapping	Senate (Queensland)	Resigned
10 Mar 2025	Liberal	Luan Walker	Fraser	Withdrew candidacy due to section 44 concerns.
10 Mar 2025	Liberal	Joel Drysdale	Scullin	Withdrew candidacy due to section 44 concerns.
30 Mar 2025	Better Together	Lucy Bradlow and Bronwyn Bock (Note: Bradlow and Bock intended to run as "job sharing candidates". The AEC stated they would be required to reject the nomination, as electoral law does not allow two people to share a nomination for one seat.)	Senate (Victoria)	Withdrew candidacy due to Bradlow being a dual citizen, thus unable to stand under section 44 of the Constitution of Australia.
3 Apr 2025	National	Katrina Hodgkinson	Whitlam	Announced as a candidate on 21 February 2025 by National Party leader David Littleproud, but withdrew her candidacy to avoid a three-cornered contest with Labor and the Liberals.
6 Apr 2025	Libertarian	Prem Wakeman	Hunter	Announced as a candidate on 19 March 2025, but party withdrew and endorsed One Nation candidate Stuart Bonds to avoid helping Labor retain the seat.
6 Apr 2025	Liberal	Ben Britton	Whitlam	Endorsed as the Liberal candidate for Whitlam in December 2024, but disendorsed on 6 April 2025 after earlier controversial statements came to light two days before.
9 Apr 2025	Sustainable Australia	Fenella Edwards	Senate (Tasmania)	Disendorsed for unknown reasons; contested election as ungrouped independent candidate.
10 Apr 2025	Fusion	Kerry Graham	Senate (Tasmania)	Announced as candidate but did not contest for unknown reasons.
10 April 2025	Close of nominations			
14 Apr 2025	Family First	Malachi Brogden Hearne	Longman	Disendorsed for homophobic and white supremacist social media posts.
16 Apr 2025	Greens	Owen Fitzgerald	Franklin	Withdrew after discovering he held dual citizenship in New Zealand by descent.
21 Apr 2025	Trumpet of Patriots	Jason Smart	Flinders	Withdrew in protest over party how-to-vote card decisions.
22 Apr 2025	Legalise Cannabis	Paul Gullan	Canning	Disendorsed for antisemitic social media posts.
23 Apr 2025	Great Australian	William Bay	Senate (Queensland)	Resigned from party over concerns regarding potential misuse of party funds and undermining of his campaign by party leadership.
24 Apr 2025	Trumpet of Patriots	Lincoln Stewart	Senate (Western Australia)	Resigned from party over how-to-vote card decisions.
28 Apr 2025	Trumpet of Patriots	Mark Aldridge	Makin	Resigned from party over concerns regarding its approach to campaigning and how-to-vote card decisions.
