= Better Together Party =

Political party in Australia

- Abbreviation: BTP
- Founders: Bronwen Bock and Lucy Bradlow
- Founded: 20 April 2024; 11 months ago
- Membership (2025): 1,556

Website
- bettertogetherparty.com.au

The Better Together Party (BTP) is an Australian political party. It was registered to participate in the 2025 Australian federal election, but the party did not end up contesting. The party intended to nominate co-party leaders Lucy Bradlow and Bronwen Bock as a single "job-sharing" candidacy for a Senate seat in Victoria, but withdrew their candidacy due to Bradlow being ineligible due to dual citizenship.

== History ==
Bradlow and Bock originally intended to stand as a single "job-sharing" candidate for the Division of Higgins. However, the Australian Electoral Commission (AEC) abolished the division in September 2024 as part of a redistribution. Bradlow and Bock subsequently announced their intention to stand as a single candidate as a Senator for Victoria instead.

The AEC stated they would not accept the candidature as the required forms only allow for one candidate to be named. In February 2025, Better Together began legal proceedings in the Federal Court of Australia to compel the AEC to accept their nomination. The court case was scheduled to be heard on 12 March 2025.

On 28 March 2025, Bradlow and Bock issued a joint statement announcing their withdrawal as a candidate for the 2025 federal election due to a "legal issue". The issue was later reported to be that Bradlow held South African citizenship, thus disqualifying her from running for parliament under Section 44 of the Constitution of Australia that forbids dual citizens holding federal political office.
