= One Nation =

Political party in Australia

- Abbreviation: ON; ONP; PHON
- Leader: Pauline Hanson
- Chairperson: Pauline Hanson
- Secretary: Sean Bell
- Founders: Pauline Hanson; David Oldfield; David Ettridge
- Founded: 11 April 1997; 29 years ago
- Registered: 27 June 1997; 29 years ago
- Headquarters: 2/6–12 Boronia Rd, Brisbane
- Youth wing: Young Nation
- Membership: ▲60,000–70,000
- Ideology: Hansonism; Australian nationalism; Right-wing populism
- Political position: Right-wing to far-right
- Colours: Orange Blue
- Party branches: ACT; NSW; NT; Qld; SA; Tas; Vic; WA
- House of Representatives: 2 / 150
- Senate: 4 / 76
- State and territory lower houses: 5 / 465
- State and territory upper houses: 6 / 156

Website
- onenation.org.au

Pauline Hanson's One Nation (PHON), commonly known as One Nation (ON), is a right-wing to far-right political party in Australia. It is led by its founder Pauline Hanson, who is the party's president until she chooses to resign. Hanson has been a senator for Queensland since 2016 and previously served in the House of Representatives from 1996 to 1998.

The party was founded by Hanson in 1997 following her disendorsement by the Liberal Party and enjoyed an initial period of electoral success in the late 1990s. It polled second at the 1998 Queensland state election and won the third-highest vote count in both the House of Representatives and Senate at the 1998 federal election, though only winning a single Senate seat. It subsequently underwent a period of electoral decline and lull, and underwent several party splits, while retaining representation in the Parliament of Queensland until 2009. Following Hanson's return as leader, the party won four seats at the 2016 federal election and retained representation across the following three federal elections, despite several high-profile defections. The party experienced increased popularity in and following the May 2025 federal election. After the Liberal Party's leadership challenge and falling out with the Nationals, former deputy prime minister Barnaby Joyce defected from the Nationals and joined One Nation in December 2025. Australia's richest person, Gina Rinehart, has provided funding to the party since then. Several nationwide opinion polls were ranking One Nation ahead of the Coalition as the highest-polling party on the political right by February 2026.

One Nation's policy stances have largely been shaped by the views of its leader, sometimes referred to as Hansonism. Opposition to multiculturalism has been a hallmark of the party since its creation; it initially focused on criticism of Asian immigration and government welfare policies relating to Indigenous Australians, and later expanded to include criticism of Islam. The party's economic policies have been characterised by economic nationalism and protectionism, including opposition to foreign ownership of land and economic rationalism. Opposition to climate change action, including opposition to the expansion of renewable energy, has become a prominent aspect of the party's agenda following the election of man made climate change denier Malcolm Roberts as a senator. On foreign policy, the party has adopted anti-globalist stances including support for withdrawal of Australia from international institutions and agreements.

== History ==
=== Background ===
In the lead-up to the March 1996 federal election, Pauline Hanson was endorsed as the Liberal Party of Australia candidate for the House of Representatives seat of Oxley, based on Ipswich, for the March 1996 federal election. At the time, the seat was thought of as a Labor stronghold. The Labor incumbent, Les Scott, held it with an almost 15% two-party majority, making it the safest Labor seat in Queensland. Because of this, Hanson was believed of having no chance of winning the seat.

Hanson received widespread media attention when, leading up to the election, she advocated the abolition of special government assistance for Aboriginal Australians and criticism of multiculturalism, resulting in her being disendorsed by the Liberal Party. Ballot papers had already been printed listing Hanson as the Liberal candidate, and the Australian Electoral Commission had closed nominations for the seat. As a result, Hanson was still listed as the Liberal candidate when votes were cast, even though Liberal leader John Howard had declared she would not be allowed to sit with the Liberals if elected.

On election night, Hanson took a large lead on the first count and picked up enough preferences from Democrat voters to defeat Scott on the sixth count. Her victory came amid Labor's near-collapse in Queensland, which saw it reduced to only two seats in the state. Hanson won 54% of the two-candidate-preferred vote. Since Hanson had been disendorsed, she entered parliament as an independent.

=== Early years ===
==== Foundation (1997) ====
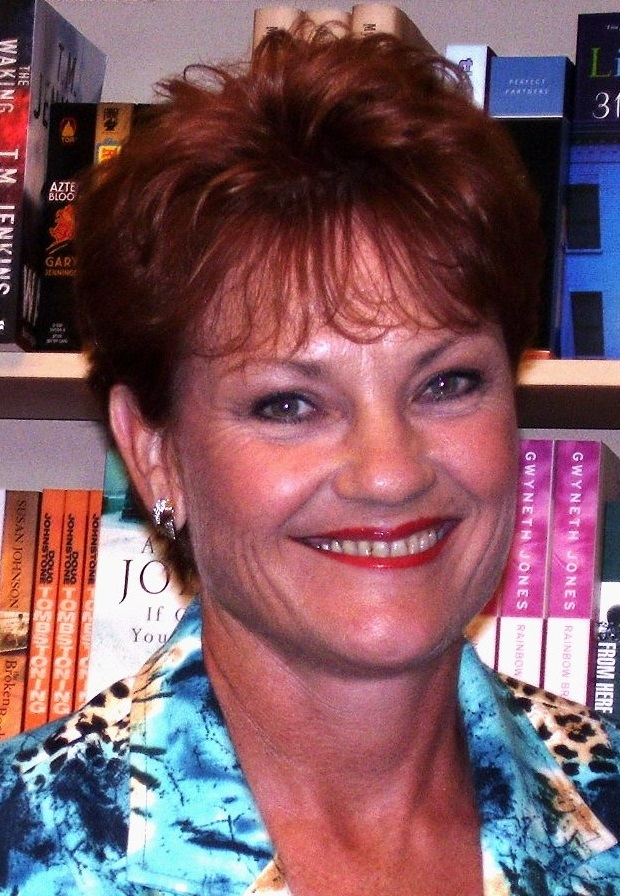
One Nation leader Pauline Hanson, pictured in 2007

Shortly after being elected to federal parliament, Hanson formed the One Nation party with co-founders David Oldfield and David Ettridge. During the formative days of One Nation, Oldfield was employed by Liberal Party backbench MP Tony Abbott as a political advisor. One Nation was launched on 11 April 1997, at an event held in Ipswich, Queensland. The party was officially registered by the Australian Electoral Commission (AEC) on 27 June.

==== First elections (1998) ====
Percentage of first preference votes for One Nation in each electorate at the 1998 Queensland state election

The 1998 Queensland state election produced One Nation's greatest electoral success, with the ALP winning 44 seats to be the largest party in the Assembly, the Coalition winning 32 seats and One Nation winning 11 seats. During the campaign, polling for One Nation led to commentators saying One Nation might secure the balance of power in a hung parliament. During the campaign, all three major political parties suffered a decline in voter support due to One Nation having entered the fray. The National Party saw an 11.1% drop in support, their Liberal Party coalition partners lost 6.7% and Labor's vote dropped 4.0%. To the surprise of many pundits, the One Nation Party received 22.7% of the first preference vote, giving them the second largest voter turnout for any party in Queensland during the 1998 election. One Nation drew the majority of its support from regional and rural Queensland, winning nine of its 11 seats in rural and regional electorates.

With nearly 23% of the vote, One Nation gained a higher percentage of the vote than any other third party (i.e. not Labor or Coalition) at the state or territory level since Federation. This was also the only election at which a third party gained more votes than both the Liberal Party and the National Party considered separately. One Nation did well enough to render any attempt to calculate a statewide two-party vote meaningless. Additionally, it did well enough to deny Labor a majority, as seven of One Nation's seats would have gone to Labor had it not been for leakage of Coalition preferences. Had Labor won even one of those seats, it would have been able to form government in its own right. As it turned out, Labor took one of those seats a few months later in a by-election triggered by the resignation of the One Nation member.

At the 1998 federal election, Hanson contested the new seat of Blair after a redistribution effectively split Oxley in half. Hanson lost to Liberal candidate Cameron Thompson, and the One Nation candidate in Oxley lost the seat to ALP candidate Bernie Ripoll. One Nation candidate Heather Hill was elected as a senator for Queensland. Hill's eligibility to sit as a senator was successfully challenged in Sue v Hill under the Australian Constitution on the basis that she had failed to renounce her childhood British citizenship, despite being a naturalised Australian citizen. The seat went to the party's Len Harris following a recount.

Political scientists Ian McAllister and Clive Bean, in an analysis of the 1998 federal election, found that although it was assumed that One Nation supporters came from a traditionally conservative demographic, instead:

[I]n a number of significant respects it in fact tends more towards Labor's profile instead. One Nation support, for example, comes disproportionately from manual workers, trade union members, those who describe themselves as working class, the less well educated, men and people who never attend church – a list of characteristics which comes close to defining the archetypal Labor voter ... [The evidence] suggests that it is Labor-style voters in rural areas – rather than the much more predominantly urban Labor voter – who are chiefly attracted to One Nation.

==== Internal disputes and claims of corruption (1999–2003) ====
The party was affected by internal divisions and has split several times. Lawsuits involving ex-members did eventually force Hanson to repay approximately $500,000 of public funding won at the 1998 Queensland election amid claims by Abbott that the party was fraudulently registered. Abbott established a trust fund called "Australians for Honest Politics Trust" to help bankroll civil court cases against the party. The suits alleged that the party was undemocratically constituted in order to concentrate all power in the hands of three people—Hanson, Ettridge and Oldfield (in particular Oldfield)—and that it technically had only two members: Ettridge and Hanson. Even though Hanson's fraud charges were dropped, the Electoral Commission of Queensland never reimbursed Hanson for the monies that they collected from the claim.

Within a year of One Nation's electoral success, three of the 11 Queensland MPs elected had quit the party claiming the leadership had too much control over the party. The One Nation contingent in the Queensland Parliament split, with dissident members forming the rival City Country Alliance in late 1999.

The first Annual General Meeting of the One Nation party was held in April 1999, which critic Paul Reynolds said demonstrated that One Nation lacked organisation.

At the 1999 New South Wales state election, David Oldfield was elected to the New South Wales Legislative Council. In October 2000, Hanson expelled Oldfield from the party after a disagreement. His expulsion created even more instability in a party which was constantly embroiled in scandal and internal strife. Oldfield attacked Hanson publicly, saying that "everything including her maiden speech and every word of any consequence that she's said since, has actually been written for her". Oldfield engineered a split within the party, creating One Nation NSW, in 2001. The new party took advantage of electoral party registration laws to register itself as a political party under the 'One Nation' name with the NSW electoral commission, and achieved registration in April 2002.

At the 2001 Western Australian state election One Nation won three seats in the state, however the party was reduced to three seats the same year at the 2001 Queensland state election. During the 2001 Australian federal election, the party's vote fell from 9% to 5.5%. Hanson failed in her bid to win a Senate seat from Queensland, despite polling a strong 10% of the primary vote. Hanson also failed to win a seat in the New South Wales Legislative Council.

In 2001, disendorsed One Nation candidate Terry Sharples accused the party of not having the 500 members needed for registration, and called for the party to be deregistered, which was carried by the Supreme Court. Hanson appealed the verdict but was unsuccessful. Hanson appeared before the Brisbane Magistrates Court to face charges of electoral fraud, that same year. Hanson pleaded not guilty to the charges, claiming that she was being subjected to "a political witch-hunt." While court hearings proceeded, Hanson ran for a seat in the NSW Upper House as an independent, but only received 1.9 per cent of the vote.

Both Ettridge and Hanson were found guilty of fraudulently registering One Nation and obtaining more than $500,000 from the AEC, in 2003. Crown lawyers accused them both of falsely claiming more than 500 people were party members when they were not truly members. Hanson was sentenced to three years in jail, stating outside the court that the verdict was "Rubbish, I'm not guilty... it's a joke".

It was later disclosed that Abbott had been working behind the scenes to take Ettridge and Hanson down, meeting with several disgruntled One Nation members including Sharples. On 6 November of that same year, Hanson was released from prison after successfully appealing her conviction; she was acquitted on all counts.

==== Electoral decline (2004–2013) ====
At the 2004 Queensland state election, One Nation polled less than 5% of the vote and its sole elected representative, Rosa Lee Long, acted as an independent. One Nation attempted to defend its Queensland Senate seat at the 2004 federal election, but lost it (effectively to the National Party). Len Harris's Senate term expired on 30 June 2005.

On 8 February 2005, One Nation lost federal party status but was re-registered in time for the 2007 federal election. It still had state parties in Queensland and New South Wales. Subsequently, it created another state party in Western Australia. In the February 2005 Western Australian state election, the One Nation vote collapsed.

In the 2006 South Australian state election, six One Nation candidates stood for the lower house. Their highest levels of the primary vote was 4.1% in the district of Hammond and 2.7% in Goyder, with the other four hovering around 1%. They attracted 0.8% (7559 votes) of the upper house vote. One Nation consequently won no seats in that election.

In the 2006 Queensland state election, the party contested four of 89 seats, and its vote collapsed. It suffered a swing of 4.3% to be left with just 0.6% of the vote. Its only remaining seat in the state (and country), Tablelands, was retained with an increased majority by Rosa Lee Long. Tablelands was abolished prior to the 2009 Queensland state election, with Lee Long failing to win the seat of Dalrymple.

In the 2012 Queensland state election the party unsuccessfully contested six seats. The party received only 2,525 first preference votes (representing 0.1% of the total cast) across the state.

=== Pauline Hanson's second leadership ===
==== Revival of Pauline Hanson's One Nation (2013–2015) ====
Hanson rejoined One Nation as a rank-and-file member in 2013. Later that year, she unsuccessfully contested the Senate for New South Wales at the 2013 federal election. In 2014, Hanson was reappointed as leader by the One Nation executive. She contested the seat of Lockyer for the party at the January 2015 Queensland state election, falling 114 votes short of defeating sitting Liberal National Party member Ian Rickuss.

In 2013, it was reported by One Nation that the party had more than 5000 members, with the figure rising since Hanson returned as party leader.

In July 2015, Hanson announced that the party was renamed the original "Pauline Hanson's One Nation" and contested in the Senate for Queensland at the 2016 federal election.

In the lead up to the 2016 election, Hanson arranged a "Fed Up" tour that began in July 2015 as part of her re-election campaign, flying in a private plane to Rockhampton prior to a Reclaim Australia rally, piloted by James Ashby.

==== Return to federal politics in 45th parliament (2016) ====
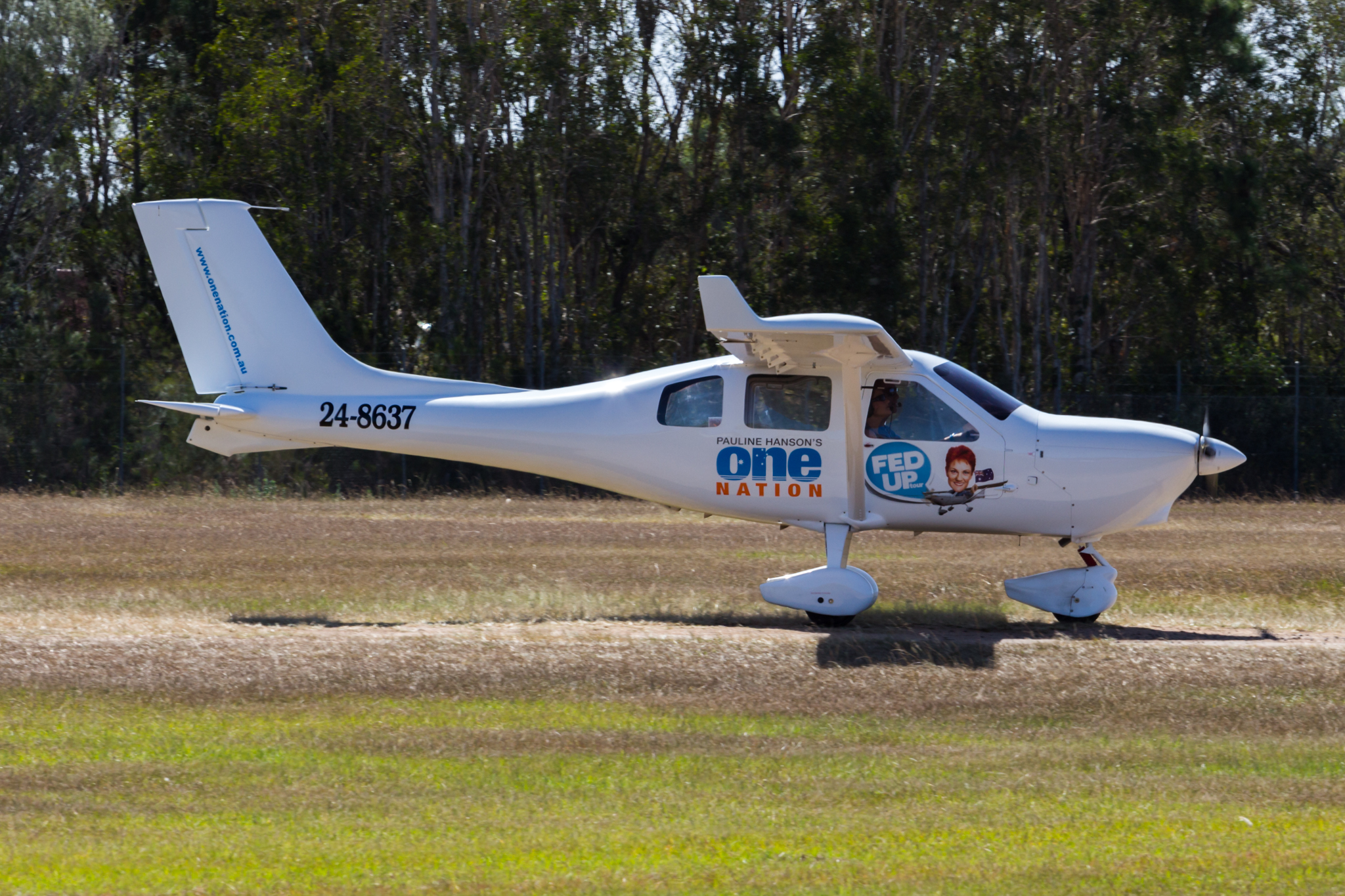
Pauline Hanson in a Jabiru J230 at Caboolture Airfield for the Caboolture Air Show. The aircraft has "Fed Up" slogan decals on the side (April 2016)

At the 2016 federal election the party polled 4.3% (+3.8) of the nationwide primary vote in the Senate. Only Queensland polled higher for the party than their nationwide percentage − the party polled 9.2% (+8.6) of the primary vote in that state. Pauline Hanson (QLD) and three other One Nation candidates − Malcolm Roberts (QLD), Brian Burston (NSW) and Rod Culleton (WA) were elected to the Senate.

Rod Culleton (WA) left the party in December 2016, after months of legal troubles and party infighting to sit as an independent bringing the number of party senators to three. On 3 February 2017, the High Court of Australia ruled that Culleton's election was invalid due to a conviction for which he was subject to being sentenced at the time of the election, notwithstanding that the conviction was subsequently annulled. The resulting vacancy was filled by a recount of the votes at the election, which resulted in Peter Georgiou taking the seat and returning the One Nation representation in the Senate to four.

On 22 May 2017, a new scandal arose when a taped conversation between Hanson and political advisor James Ashby was released. The tape showed that Ashby had supported charging One Nation candidates inflated prices for campaign materials.

During the 2017 Western Australian state election, several One Nation candidates either quit or were disendorsed. Dane Sorensen provided a copy of the party's Western Australian "candidate agreement" form for this election, which all candidates had to sign. It includes an "administration fee" of $250,000 if an elected candidate subsequently leaves the party. One Nation previously formed a 'conservative bloc' with the Liberal Democratic Party and Shooters, Fishers and Farmers Party in the Western Australia Legislative Council.

Hanson drew widespread condemnation when she wore the full Islamic dress into Senate Question Time, before calling for the burqa to be banned in Australia on 17 August 2017. Audible gasps of shock were heard in the parliament. Liberal Party Senator and Attorney-General of Australia George Brandis condemned Hanson's actions, declaring to the parliament that "To ridicule that community, to drive it into a corner, to mock its religious garments is an appalling thing to do. I would ask you to reflect on that". Senator Brandis received applause and praise from all sides of parliament for his response.

On 27 October 2017, the full High Court, as Court of Disputed Returns, ruled that Malcolm Roberts had been ineligible to be elected to the Parliament. On 13 November, Senator Fraser Anning took Roberts' seat after a Senate recount. However, on the same day Anning left the party to become an independent.

On 14 June 2018, Senator Brian Burston announced his resignation from the party to sit as an independent, following a month-long clash with Hanson centred around the Turnbull Government's corporate tax cuts, on which Hanson had reversed her position. This reduced the party to 2 senators, with Hanson remaining the only member of One Nation elected at the 2016 Federal election.

On 15 October 2018, a Senate motion brought by the party stating "it is OK to be white" was defeated 31–28 in a vote. The Liberal government expressed regret at the support the vote received, blaming it to an administrative error in which its senators were mistakenly instructed to vote positively. Critics noted that the phrase has been associated with white supremacist rhetoric.

Former Labor Party leader Mark Latham joined the party in November 2018 as leader for New South Wales. He successfully contested a seat in the New South Wales Legislative Council, winning it in March 2019.

In March 2019, One Nation was the subject of a two-part Al Jazeera documentary series asserting that the party was soliciting financial assistance from the National Rifle Association of America and Koch Industries in order to change Australian gun control laws. Al Jazeera used an undercover reporter posing as a gun rights advocate. In response, One Nation leader Pauline Hanson condemned the documentary as a "hit piece" by a Qatar government backed news agency and announced that she had filed a complaint with the Australian Security Intelligence Organisation. Similar sentiments were echoed by the One Nation officials, James Ashby and Steve Dickson, who were featured in the documentary. In response to the documentary, the Australian Electoral Commission said that none of the activities shown in the documentary violated section 326 of the Commonwealth Electoral Act 1918 since they occurred overseas.

==== 2019 election and 46th parliament ====
At the May 2019 federal election, One Nation polled 5.40% (up 1.12%) for the nationwide Senate primary vote. The party polled higher than their national vote in Queensland, taking 10.27% up 1.08%, of the primary vote in the senate.

The PHON House of Representatives candidate for the Division of O'Connor, Dean Smith, was in December of the same year a target of recruitment for Neo-Nazi group The Base. In secretly recorded tapes of his "interview" by a recruiter, Smith tells of his hatred of immigrants and his wish to "save the race". He tells the recruiter that he had become "more and more extreme and passionate about my views", and disillusioned with One Nation and the possibility of a political solution. However, he was deemed too great a risk for The Base because of his political profile, so was not admitted into their ranks.

In 2019, Hanson received widespread condemnation in the Australian media after claiming that domestic violence victims routinely lie to the Family Court. The Law Council of Australia called for the abandonment of a federal parliamentary inquiry into the family law system, citing concerns that the hearings were being used by Hanson for political purposes to undermine domestic violence claims made by women.

==== 2022–2024 elections ====
One Nation ran 149 candidates in the 2022 federal election, standing in all House of Representatives seats except the inner Melbourne-based seat of Higgins and the rural Queensland seat of Kennedy, held by Bob Katter. According to ABC News, One Nation ran "ghost candidates" in several electorates for the 2022 federal election, who did not active campaign, had no online presence and did not live in their electorates. George Christensen, the incumbent Nationals MP for Dawson, defected to One Nation in the lead-up to the election and stood unsuccessfully on the party's Senate ticket in Queensland.

In 2022, One Nation won its first parliamentary seats in South Australia and Victoria, with Sarah Game elected to the South Australian Legislative Council at the 2022 South Australian state election and Rikkie-Lee Tyrrell elected to the Victorian Legislative Council at the 2022 Victorian state election.

In 2023, New South Wales independent state MP Tania Mihailuk – a former ALP member – defected to One Nation. At the 2023 New South Wales state election the party won a record three Legislative Council seats, with leader Mark Latham re-elected for another term and Mihailuk filling Latham's vacant seat. In August 2023, Hanson intervened in the New South Wales state branch to remove Latham as party leader. Latham and his colleague Rod Roberts subsequently resigned to sit as independents, with Mihailuk announced as the next leader of One Nation in New South Wales in December 2023. She resigned from One Nation in December 2024.

One Nation campaigned heavily against the Indigenous Voice to parliament in the referendum held in October that year, One Nation supported the No vote and was against holding a referendum on the matter.

In February 2024, Western Australian independent MP Ben Dawkins announced he would be joining One Nation as the party's only parliamentary member. He resigned from the party in December 2024. Queensland state MP Stephen Andrew had also resigned from One Nation in August 2024 after they did not re-endorse him at the 2024 Queensland state election.

At the 2025 Western Australian state election One Nation won two seats in the Western Australian Legislative Council, including state leader Rod Caddies.

==== 2025 to present ====
In the lead-up to the 2025 Australian federal election to elect the 47th Parliament of Australia, pollsters recorded an increase in One Nations primary vote, particularly near the end of the campaign period where the party began to come close to or surpass their result at the 1998 Australian federal election. One Nation ran 147 candidates in the House of Representatives, and a Senate team for each state and territory except for the Australian Capital Territory. One Nation won 6.4% of the vote in the House of Representatives, the second-best result for the party since its inception. One Nation won a senate seat in New South Wales and Western Australia with Warwick Stacey and Tyron Whitten, doubling its Senate representation. Stacey resigned for health reasons shortly after his election, with Sean Bell, a former political advisor to Pauline Hanson, announced as Stacey's successor on 16 September 2025.

In May 2025, South Australian MLC Sarah Game quit the party, citing brand issues associated with One Nation. It came after her mother, who had been leader of One Nation in South Australia, Jennifer Game, resigned from the party after she was not chosen to head the party ticket in the Legislative Council for the 2026 South Australian state election. Game became an independent, and then in July 2025 founded a new party, Fair Go for Australians.

In October 2025, Hanson announced she would begin the process of changing the party's name from Pauline Hanson's One Nation to simply One Nation. On 8 December 2025, Barnaby Joyce formally announced that he had joined One Nation, becoming the party's sole member in the House of Representatives. In a statement, Joyce confirmed that he intended to run as a One Nation Senate candidate for New South Wales at the next election.

After the Bondi Beach terrorist attack in December 2025, One Nation's popularity increased. In January 2026, a DemosAU poll showed One Nation had experienced a renewed polling surge since the 2025 federal election to 23 per cent of the primary vote, with the Coalition dropping to the same level and Labor dropping to 29 per cent. The party contested the 2026 South Australian state election in all lower house seats, and ran four upper house candidates. On the eve of election day, on 20 March 2026, it was revealed that one of their candidates, Aoi (aka Trent) Baxter, was wanted by police in the UK for failing to appear in court after being charged under the Sexual Offences Act. In the 21 March South Australian election, One Nation won a higher primary vote than the Liberals. As was the case with the 1998 Queensland election, One Nation's showing was strong enough to render any attempt to calculate a statewide two-party vote meaningless. The Labor Party won a second term with a landslide win.

One Nation contested the 2026 Farrer by-election with their candidate David Farley being elected; this was the first time that a One Nation candidate had been elected to the House of Representatives. In June 2026, One Nation ran a fundraiser called Fire the Liar, successfully raising more than $4 million. In August 2026, One Nation hired former policy adviser to prime minister Scott Morrison, Chris Taylor as Hanson's chief of staff. Ashby moved to a role of party director. The party successfully contested the 2026 Secret Harbour state by-election in Western Australia, and their candidate Luke Herdegen became the first One Nation candidate elected to the Western Australian Legislative Assembly. In September 2026 it was revealed that One Nation used party funds to build a $56,000 shed on the private property of its adviser James Ashby.

== Ideology ==
One Nation's policies and ideology have been described as based on ultranationalism, right-wing populism, populism, and opposition to immigration. Its policies have been also described as nationalist, national-conservative, socially conservative, conservative, and protectionist. Its political position has been described as right-wing, extreme right, radical right, and far-right.

=== Early years ===
In its early years, One Nation's policies were said to be synonymous with opposition to affirmative action for Aboriginal communities. Some key themes of Pauline Hanson's 1998 maiden speech were opposition to what she said were increasingly high rates of immigration from Asian countries and an argument for economic protectionist policies.

During its inception, One Nation rallied against Liberal and Labor immigration and multicultural policies which, it argued, were leading to "the Asianisation of Australia."

Former Australian Prime Minister Paul Keating denounced Hanson in a speech in 1996, saying that she projected "the ugly face of racism" and was "dangerously divisive and deeply hurtful to many of her fellow Australians."

Hanson and One Nation have disputed accusations of racism and argue that the main parties are out of touch with many Australians on the issues of immigration, asylum seekers, and multiculturalism; and have ended up adopting some of the policies One Nation initially called for. Milton Osborne noted in 1999 that research indicated Hanson's initial supporters did not cite immigration as a major reason for their support for One Nation, but instead they were most concerned about economic issues and unemployment. A 2001 study showed that One Nation had extensive informal ties and received endorsements from far-right movements due to the party requiring "the support of those groups in establishing the party and because of a convergence of interests".

=== Contemporary ===
Political scientist Ian McAllister argues the current iteration of One Nation from 2017 does not have much in the way of policy beyond an "anti-establishment stance" while others have argued it has changed to focus its policies on opposition to Islam. Writer Hans-Georg Betz described One Nation and Pauline Hanson in 2019 as among "the first prominent radical right-wing populist entrepreneurs to mobilize popular resentment against a very specific target — the intellectual elite" and that in the twenty-first century where "today's army of self-styled commentators and pundits summarily dismissing radical right-wing populist voters as uncouth, uneducated plebeians intellectually incapable of understanding the blessings of progressive identity politics, Hanson's anti-elite rhetoric anno 1996 proved remarkably prescient, if rather tame." Betz also argued that One Nation differs from European right-wing parties by focusing on its own brand of populism which he termed Hansonism based on Hanson's personality and debates unique to Australian society.

Despite the party's early image as an anti-immigration party, the party has – since 2016 – run a number of migrant Chinese and Indian candidates in elections.

Various One Nation election candidates have made anti-LGBTQ comments. During the 2017 Queensland state election, One Nation disendorsed its Bundamba candidate Shan Ju Lin after her anti-gay social media post. Lin accused James Ashby of deciding on Hanson's behalf that Lin should be disendorsed. In December 2016, Andy Semple withdrew as a candidate for Currumbin, after the party told him to delete an LGBT joke on Twitter. Other examples include one candidate saying in 2019 that "The only thing worse than a gay person with power is a woman", another in 2017 calling same-sex marriage "poof poof marriage" and making the comment "You see when we consummate a marriage kids are generally born 9 mths [sic] later when gays consummate its [sic] just bum sex for enjoyment", and a third – also in 2017 – saying that "Norwegian homosexuals" are behind a "mind control program". In August 2026, after another of its candidates called homosexuality a "mental illness", One Nation MP Barnaby Joyce denied that One Nation is homophobic and asserted that it is "one of the gayest parties in Australia". This is despite both Joyce's and Hanson's history of generally opposing initiatives supporting the LGBTQ community, such as marriage equality.

One Nation blogs in support of Trump
- Trump Wins at the Wayback Machine (archived 8 November 2024)
- Want Trump's action and style, then it's One Nation you need at the Wayback Machine (archived 5 August 2026)
- Pauline Hanson: "I Want to Make Australia Great Again" at the Wayback Machine (archived 10 May 2026)
- Pauline Hanson Praises Trump’s Strength on Iran and Slams Albanese for Weak National Leadership at the Wayback Machine (archived 10 May 2026)

One Nation has expressed strong support for the policies of Donald Trump, and it has been characterised as "Trump-aligned" by Reuters. Hanson has called for Australia to emulate policies of the Trump administrations, and used slogans such as "Make Australia Great Again" and "Make Albo Go Away". Prudence Flowers of The Conversation argues that the political tactics and rhetoric of Trump are reflected in One Nation's vocal opposition to "radical gender ideology", "critical race theory", support for "mass deportations", and their characterisation of political enemies as "woke".

After the Trump-led Republican Party suffered considerable losses in the 2026 United States elections on 3 November, One Nation quietly removed blogs referencing its support for Trump and the MAGA movement from its website. One such article, from January 2025, promised "Trump's action and style" and closely aligned itself with political views of Trump.

== Policies ==
=== Immigration and asylum ===
The party also calls for a travel ban on certain countries, similar to one enacted by the Trump administration in the United States. The party also supports stronger assimilation of immigrants. One Nation also seeks to withdraw Australia from the United Nations Refugee Convention and is opposed to the UN Global Compact on Migration. One Nation has been described as anti-Islam.

The party has pledged to enforce a net-negative immigration policy in its first three years and cutting 750,000 temporary visas. Hanson has called on international students to leave the country when applying for visas and has accused them of abusing Australia's immigration system.

In 2018, Hanson called for immigration numbers to be capped at 75,000 a year. In 2025, Hanson called for immigration to be cut to 130,000 a year.

=== The economy and employment ===
One Nation supports a broadly protectionist platform, saying that it would review free trade agreements and revoke any "that are not in Australia's best interest", they also wish to reimplement import tariffs. It is opposed to foreign ownership of Australian agricultural land and businesses, as well as the privatisation of water assets. Wishing to prioritise jobs for Australian nationals, it would investigate "the abuse of foreign work visas."

One Nation backed the Turnbull government's controversial 2018 corporate tax cuts.

The party would move foreign-owned multinationals out of the corporation tax system and into a transactions based system, saying that too many of them pay no tax on profits made in Australia.

Hanson has called for industrial relations to be overhauled. Hanson has said that businesses tell her that their employees are "lazy" and too difficult to sack.

=== Domestic policies ===
The party argues for the introduction of Citizens Initiated Referenda (CIR) and states it will review the salaries and pensions paid to Australian politicians. In 2021, the Senate approved a motion tabled by Pauline Hanson which called on the federal government to reject the teaching of critical race theory in Australian schools. It also supports a ban on wearing the burqa in public spaces. One Nation has backed Hanson's comments regarding downplaying scientific consensus on climate change. During the debate on the Marriage Amendment (Definition and Religious Freedoms) Act 2017 which would legalise same-sex marriage in Australia, Hanson and other members of One Nation expressed their opposition to same-sex marriage. However, Hanson also stated the party would not take an official stance on same-sex marriage and that One Nation senators would be allowed a free vote on the issue.

One Nation is broadly anti-abortion, particularly relating to late term abortions, describing itself as "pro-life". The party favours policies such as a gestational limit for abortions, banning sex-selective abortion, and doctors' rights to allow for them to object to performing such a procedure.

One Nation wants to introduce mandatory photo ID for Medicare cards.

One Nation members and parliamentarians have criticised the increasing use of the Aboriginal and Torres Strait Islander flags alongside the Australian one.

The party wants to remove building code mandates, such as removing the requirement for new dwellings to be wheelchair-compliant. One Nation also wants to reduce funding for arts and abolish the Therapeutic Goods Administration (TGA).

=== Law and order ===
One Nation claims it will increase rehabilitation facilities for drug addicts and introduce life sentences for drug traffickers, Pauline Hanson has previously voiced her support of medicinal cannabis but strong objection to recreational drug usage and opposition to pill testing. The party supports gun ownership but wants tougher sentences for arms traffickers. The party is opposed to any form of sharia law in Australia. One Nation has pledged to increase the state's investment on law and order infrastructure. They want to bolster police numbers by bringing Australian Defence Force veterans into the ranks. The party has identified 10,000 veterans that could qualify for the force.

=== Welfare and pensions ===
One Nation is in favour of a substantial increase in the aged pension and disability support pension. It was reported in 2016 that One Nation had voted with the Liberal government on a number of welfare cuts. One Nation is also opposed to increasing the age of entitlement to 70 years, and supports a $100 a week increase under the work bonus scheme for pensioners.

In 2024, One Nation cooperated with the Albanese government and minister Bill Shorten in reforming the National Disability Insurance Scheme to crack down on alleged misuse of the system and to rein in the growing costs of the program.

=== COVID-19 vaccines ===
Many politicians, commentators and scientists claim that One Nation senators have spread misinformation and conspiracies on the effectiveness and scientific basis of COVID-19 vaccines. One Nation opposes vaccine mandates, but denies being against vaccinations. However, in 2021, One Nation MLC Mark Latham said that vaccinated people should be exempt from Sydney's COVID-19 lockdown.

One Nation introduced legislation in 2021 pertaining to COVID-19 mandates, with the bill proposing banning discrimination on COVID-19 vaccination status in the fields of goods, services, facilities, employment, education, accommodation, and sport. It was supported by five Liberal-National senators; it was not passed.

=== Climate change and energy ===
One Nation senators are frequent critics of any action on climate change and have called climate science a "scam". One Nation has spread debunked conspiracy theories about climate change not occurring or being part of a plot by the United Nations. The party wants Australia to withdraw from the Paris Climate Accords.

One Nation says it is "Embracing Australian coal", supporting "baseload coal as a critical part of Australia's energy mix" and supports extending existing coal power generation capacity. One Nation also embraces Australian gas, calling it a "key national asset", wants to "lift any bans on new gas appliances in Australian households", "treat Australian gas as a strategic asset", eliminate "red, green and black tape" from the gas industry and "end the effective moratorium on offshore gas and petroleum exploration".

=== Voting system ===
In 2019, One Nation called for the abolition of full preferential voting in favour of optional preferential voting at House of Representatives elections. The announcement came shortly after Scott Morrison announced that the Liberal Party would preference One Nation behind Labor in several seats for the 2019 federal election. In Australia, optional preferential voting is currently only used for Legislative Assembly elections in New South Wales and for council elections in most warded local government areas in Queensland.

One Nation is also against the use of group voting tickets, which are currently only used for Legislative Council elections in Victoria. The party has strongly criticised Glenn Druery, a "preference whispererer" who founded the Minor Party Alliance. In the lead-up to the 2022 state election, Hanson claimed that Druery was rigging the election in favour of the incumbent state Labor government of Daniel Andrews, after a leaked video showed that Druery was trying to create a crossbench that Labor could work with. Prior to the incident, in 2017, Druery admitted that he had been directing the preferences of micro-parties away from One Nation since 1999.

=== Gender issues ===
Hanson has called the transgender movement an "insurgency" and a "militant force". She vowed to sack the Sex Discrimination Commissioner and says she would also instruct public agencies to stop participating in the Australian Equity Index. She is against biological males playing in women's sports and the presence of the movement in schools.

=== Other ===
In March 2025, Hanson said the party wants Australia to leave the United Nations, the World Health Organization, and the World Economic Forum, cut funding for the National Disability Insurance Scheme and abolish the National Indigenous Australians Agency and the Department of Climate Change.

== State and territory branches ==
Branch	Leader	Lower house seats	Upper house seats
Pauline Hanson's One Nation – ACT	No leader	0 / 25	
Pauline Hanson's One Nation – New South Wales	Mike Newman	0 / 93	0 / 42
Pauline Hanson's One Nation – Northern Territory	No leader	0 / 25	
Pauline Hanson's One Nation – Queensland	James Ashby	0 / 93	
Pauline Hanson's One Nation – South Australia	Cory Bernardi	4 / 47	3 / 22
Pauline Hanson's One Nation – Tasmania	No leader	0 / 35	0 / 15
Pauline Hanson's One Nation – Victoria	Warren Pickering	0 / 88	1 / 40
Pauline Hanson's One Nation – Western Australia	Rod Caddies	1 / 59	2 / 37

== Voter base and donors ==
One Nation has historically performed best in Queensland and in regional areas, especially Central Queensland, Darling Downs and Wide Bay–Burnett regions of Queensland and the Hunter Valley region of New South Wales. Demographically its supporters are more likely to be older, more Anglo and based in regional or the outer suburbs of cities.

A 2026 Roy Morgan Research poll found that European migrants to Australia were bigger supporters of One Nation than Asian migrants.

=== Early assessments ===
Surveys of voters at the 1998 federal election and the 1998 Queensland state election found One Nation voters were more likely than other voters to be male, residents of rural electorates, blue-collar workers and firearm owners. On measurements of political views, One Nation voters were distinguished by their anti-immigrant and anti-Aboriginal sentiments and by their dissatisfaction with or alienation from the political environment. On metrics of union membership, economic insecurity and identification as members of the working class, One Nation voters were nearly identical to Labor voters. However, a clear majority of One Nation voters were former Liberal and National voters rather than former Labor voters.

=== Recent assessments ===
In March 2026, The Australian conducted a statistical analysis of One Nation's performance at the 2026 South Australian state election, the first state election since the party's surge in popularity in late 2025 and one of the first occasions on which the party had fielded candidates in all seats. The analysis found that swings towards One Nation were the largest in seats with low rates of postgraduate education, high rates of low-income earners, and high percentages of blue-collar workers. The party enjoyed its strongest support in rural and outer suburban areas.

=== Notable supporters ===
After Barnaby Joyce joined One Nation in 2025, he confirmed that billionaire businesswoman Gina Rinehart, Australia's richest person, was providing funding to the party, along with other donors he brought with him. Rinehart lent Hanson, and later Cory Bernardi, her private jet on multiple occasions, including in South Australia, where this contravened the state's laws on political donations. Bernardi said that he would repay Rinehart for the flights. Hanson has not declared multiple flights in other parts of the country.

A 2019 report found that Pauline Hanson's One Nation Party had received over $6,000 in disclosed donations from pro-gun groups during the 2011–2018 period, with concerns these donations threatened to compromise Australia's safety by undermining gun control laws. In 2019, Hanson was filmed soliciting donations from the American National Rifle Association.

== Election results ==
=== Federal ===
Election year	House of Representatives				Senate				
Election year	# votes	% votes	# seats	+/–	# votes	% votes	# seats	# overall seats	+/–
1998	936,621	▲8.43	0 / 148	0	1,007,439	▲8.99	1 / 40	1 / 76	▲1
2001	498,032	▼4.34	0 / 150	0	644,364	▼5.54	0 / 40	1 / 76	0
2004	139,956	▼1.19	0 / 150	0	206,445	▼1.73	0 / 40	0 / 76	▼1
2007	32,650	▼0.26	0 / 150	0	52,708	▼0.42	0 / 40	0 / 76	0
2010	27,184	▼0.22	0 / 150	0	70,672	▲0.56	0 / 40	0 / 76	0
2013	22,046	▼0.17	0 / 150	0	70,851	▼0.53	0 / 40	0 / 76	0
2016 (D-D)	175,020	▲1.29	0 / 150	0	593,013	▲4.28	4 / 76	4 / 76	▲4
2019	438,587	▲3.08	0 / 151	0	788,203	▲5.40	1 / 40	2 / 76	▼2
2022	727,464	▲4.96	0 / 151	0	644,744	▼4.29	1 / 40	2 / 76	0
2025	991,814	▲6.40	0 / 150	0	899,296	▲5.67	3 / 40	4 / 76	▲2

=== New South Wales ===
Election year	Legislative Assembly				Legislative Council			
Election year	# votes	% votes	# seats	+/–	# votes	% votes	# seats	+/–
1999	281,147	▲7.53	0 / 93	0	225,668	▲6.34	1 / 42	▲1
2019	49,948	▼1.10	0 / 93	0	306,933	▲6.90	2 / 42	▲2
2023	84,683	▲1.80	0 / 93	0	273,496	▼5.92	3 / 42	▲1

=== Victoria ===
Election year	Legislative Assembly				Legislative Council			
Election year	# votes	% votes	# seats	+/–	# votes	% votes	# seats	+/–
1999	8,181	▲0.29	0 / 88	0	Did not contest Legislative Council			
2022	10,323	▼0.28	0 / 88	0	76,734	▲2.04	1 / 40	▲1

=== Western Australia ===
Election year	Legislative Assembly				Legislative Council			
Election year	# votes	% votes	# seats	+/–	# votes	% votes	# seats	+/–
2001	98,321	▲9.58	0 / 57	0	103,571	▲9.88	3 / 34	▲3
2005	17,580	▼1.64	0 / 57	0	17,435	▼1.59	0 / 34	▼3
2008	Did not contest Legislative Assembly				7,012	▼0.63	0 / 36	0
2017	65,192	▲4.93	0 / 59	0	110,480	▲8.19	3 / 36	▲3
2021	17,824	▼1.26	0 / 59	0	21,259	▼1.48	0 / 36	▼3
2025	61,174	▲4.00	0 / 59	0	59,296	▲3.82	2 / 37	▲2

=== South Australia ===
Election year	House of Assembly				Legislative Council			
Election year	# votes	% votes	# seats	+/–	# votes	% votes	# seats	+/–
2002	22,833	▲2.41	0 / 47	0	16,829	▲1.80	0 / 22	0
2006	2,591	▼0.28	0 / 47	0	7,559	▼0.81	0 / 22	0
2010	Did not contest House of Assembly				4,972	▼0.51	0 / 22	0
2022	28,664	▲2.63	0 / 47	0	46,051	▲4.23	1 / 22	▲1
2026	256,022	▲22.9	4 / 47	▲4	271,608	▲24.3	3 / 22	▲2

=== Queensland ===
Election year	Legislative Assembly			
Election year	# votes	% votes	# seats	+/–
1998	439,121	▲22.68	11 / 89	▲11
2001	179,076	▼8.69	3 / 89	▼8
2004	104,980	▼4.88	1 / 89	▼2
2006	13,207	▼0.60	1 / 89	0
2009	9,038	▼0.38	0 / 89	▼1
2012	2,525	▼0.10	0 / 89	0
2015	24,111	▲0.92	0 / 89	0
2017	371,193	▲13.73	1 / 93	▲1
2020	204,316	▼7.12	1 / 93	0
2024	248,334	▲8.00	0 / 93	▼1

=== Northern Territory ===
Election year	Legislative Assembly			
Election year	# votes	% votes	# seats	+/–
2001	1,074	▲1.32	0 / 25	0

=== Maps ===
1998 Queensland state election.

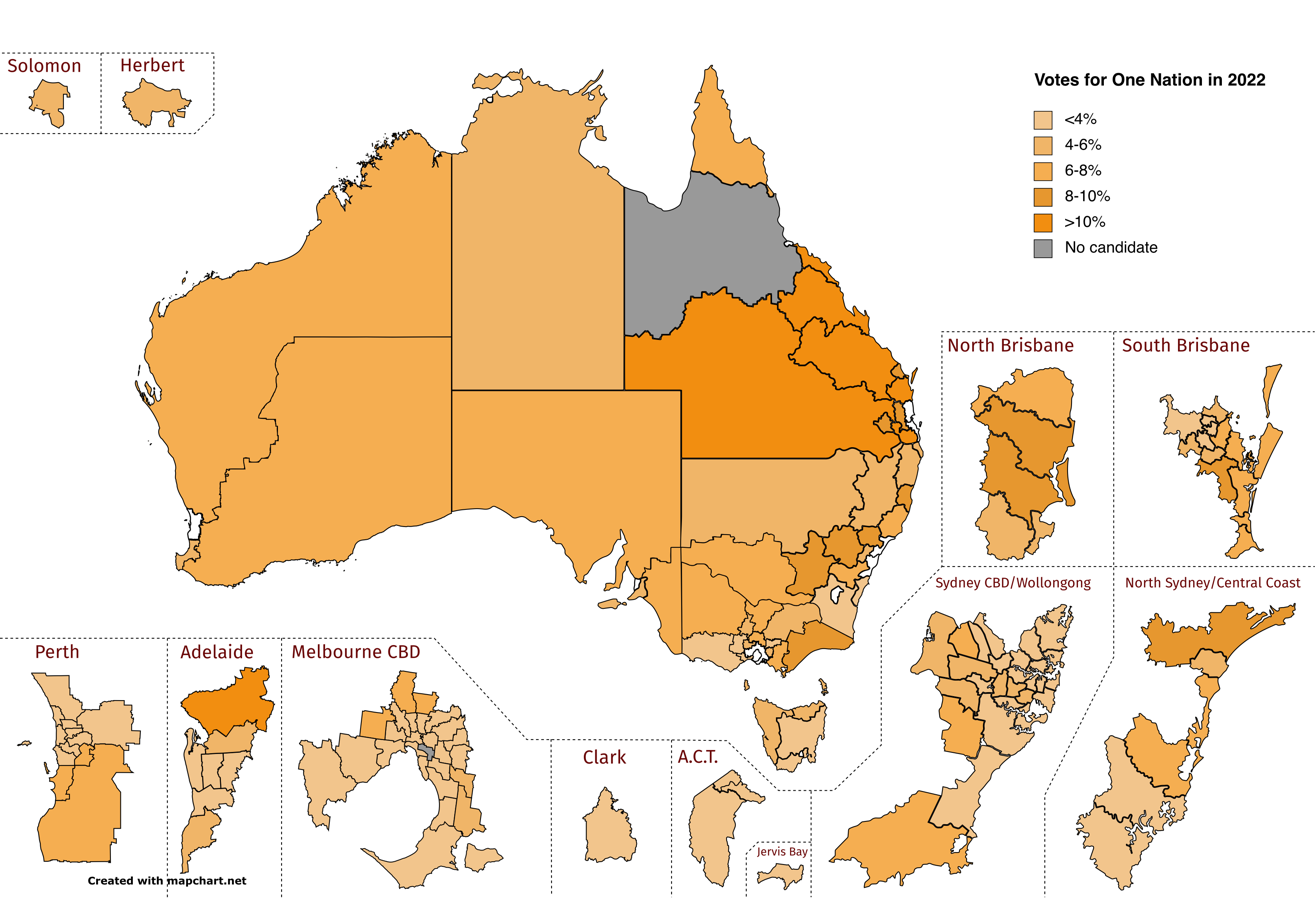
2022 Australian federal election.

== Leaders ==
=== Federal ===
Unlike the Queensland state leadership, the changes of the federal leadership of the party were largely undocumented (besides Hanson's terms), due to previously having low media attention and confusion of branch leadership within the party.

In August 2017, the party's constitution was changed so that Hanson would be party President for as long as she may wish, and to choose her successor, who may also continue until resignation.

#	Leader	Electorate	Term start	Term end	Time in office	Elections contested	Prime Minister (term)
1	Pauline Hanson	Oxley (1997–1998)	11 April 1997	5 August 2002	5 years, 116 days	1998, 2001	Howard 1996–2007
1	Pauline Hanson	— (1998–2002)	11 April 1997	5 August 2002	5 years, 116 days	1998, 2001	Howard 1996–2007
2	John Fischer	Mining and Pastoral Region (WA Legislative Council)	5 August 2002	1 June 2004	1 year, 301 days	None	Howard 1996–2007
-	No leader during this interim						
3	Ian Nelson	—	6 December 2009	24 March 2012	2 years, 109 days	2010	Rudd 2007–2010
3	Ian Nelson	—	6 December 2009	24 March 2012	2 years, 109 days	2010	Gillard 2010–2013
-	No leader during this interim						
4	Jim Savage	—	13 May 2013	18 November 2014	1 year, 189 days	2022, 2025	Gillard 2010–2013
4	Jim Savage	—	13 May 2013	18 November 2014	1 year, 189 days	2022, 2025	Rudd 2013
4	Jim Savage	—	13 May 2013	18 November 2014	1 year, 189 days	2022, 2025	Abbott 2013–2015
(1)	Pauline Hanson	Senator for Queensland	18 November 2014	Incumbent	12 years, 1 day	2016, 2019, 2022, 2025	Abbott 2013–2015
(1)	Pauline Hanson	Senator for Queensland	18 November 2014	Incumbent	12 years, 1 day	2016, 2019, 2022, 2025	Turnbull 2015–2018
(1)	Pauline Hanson	Senator for Queensland	18 November 2014	Incumbent	12 years, 1 day	2016, 2019, 2022, 2025	Morrison 2018–2022
(1)	Pauline Hanson	Senator for Queensland	18 November 2014	Incumbent	12 years, 1 day	2016, 2019, 2022, 2025	Albanese 2022–Present

=== New South Wales ===
#	Leader	Electorate	Term start	Term end	Time in office	Elections contested	Premier (term)
1	David Oldfield	Legislative Council	27 March 1999	8 October 2000	1 year, 195 days	none	Carr 1995-2005
-	No leader during this interim						
2	Brian Burston	— (2010–2016)	31 March 2010	17 June 2018	8 years, 78 days	2011, 2015	Keneally 2009-2011
2	Brian Burston	— (2010–2016)	31 March 2010	17 June 2018	8 years, 78 days	2011, 2015	O'Farrell 2011–2014
2	Brian Burston	Senator for New South Wales	31 March 2010	17 June 2018	8 years, 78 days	2011, 2015	Baird 2014–2017
2	Brian Burston	Senator for New South Wales	31 March 2010	17 June 2018	8 years, 78 days	2011, 2015	Berejiklian 2017–2021
3	Mark Latham	— (2018–2019)	7 November 2018	14 August 2023	4 years, 280 days	2019, 2023	Berejiklian 2017–2021
3	Mark Latham	Legislative Council (2019–2023)	7 November 2018	14 August 2023	4 years, 280 days	2019, 2023	Berejiklian 2017–2021
4	Tania Mihailuk	Legislative Council	10 December 2023	20 December 2024	1 year, 10 days	none	Berejiklian 2017–2021
4	Tania Mihailuk	Legislative Council	10 December 2023	20 December 2024	1 year, 10 days	none	Dominic Perrottet 2021–2023
4	Tania Mihailuk	Legislative Council	10 December 2023	20 December 2024	1 year, 10 days	none	Chris Minns 2023–present
-	No leader during this interim						
5	Mike Newman	—	28 August 2026	Incumbent	83 days	—	Chris Minns 2023–present

=== Victoria ===
#	Leader	Electorate	Term start	Term end	Time in office	Elections contested	Premier (term)
1	Andrew Carne	—	1997	21 May 1998	141 days – 1 year, 140 days	none	Kennett 1992–1999
2	Robyn Spencer	—	21 May 1998	13 June 1998	23 days	none	Kennett 1992–1999
-	No leader during this period						
3	Warren Pickering	—	3 August 2026	Incumbent	108 days	none	Carroll 2026–present

=== Western Australia ===
#	Leader	Electorate	Term start	Term end	Time in office	Elections contested	Premier (term)
1	John Fischer	Mining and Pastoral Region Legislative Council	10 February 2001	1 June 2004	3 years, 112 days	none	Court 1993–2001
1	John Fischer	Mining and Pastoral Region Legislative Council	10 February 2001	1 June 2004	3 years, 112 days	none	Gallop 2001–2006
2	Ron McClean	—	1 June 2004	9 January 2017	12 years, 222 days	2005, 2008, 2012	Gallop 2001–2006
2	Ron McClean	—	1 June 2004	9 January 2017	12 years, 222 days	2005, 2008, 2012	Carpenter 2006–2008
2	Ron McClean	—	1 June 2004	9 January 2017	12 years, 222 days	2005, 2008, 2012	Barnett 2008–2017
3	Colin Tincknell	South West Region Legislative Council	9 January 2017	2023	5 years, 357 days – 6 years, 356 days	2017, 2021	Barnett 2008–2017
3	Colin Tincknell	South West Region Legislative Council	9 January 2017	2023	5 years, 357 days – 6 years, 356 days	2017, 2021	McGowan 2017–2023
4	Rod Caddies	Legislative Council	2023	Incumbent	3 years, 322 days – 2 years, 323 days	2025	Cook 2023–present

=== South Australia ===
#	Leader	Electorate	Term start	Term end	Time in office	Elections contested	Premier (term)
1	Rodney Spencer	—	21 May 1998	13 June 1998	23 days	none	Olsen 1996–2001
-	No leader during this interim						
2	Jennifer Game	—	16 September 2021	17 May 2025	3 years, 243 days	2022	Marshall 2018–2022
2	Jennifer Game	—	16 September 2021	17 May 2025	3 years, 243 days	2022	Malinauskas 2022–present
-	No leader during this interim						
3	Cory Bernardi	Legislative Council	2 February 2026	Incumbent	290 days	2026	Malinauskas 2022–present

=== Queensland ===
#	Leader	Electorate	Term start	Term end	Time in office	Elections contested	Premier (term)
1	Heather Hill	Senator for Queensland (federal)	21 May 1998	13 June 1998	23 days	1998	Borbidge 1996–1998
2	Bill Feldman	Caboolture	13 June 1998	14 December 1999	1 year, 184 days	none	Beattie 1998–2007
—	No leader during this interim						
3	Bill Flynn	Lockyer	6 March 2001	7 February 2004	2 years, 338 days	2004	Beattie 1998–2007
4	Rosa Lee Long	Tablelands	1 June 2004	20 March 2009	4 years, 292 days	2006, 2009	Beattie 1998–2007
4	Rosa Lee Long	Tablelands	1 June 2004	20 March 2009	4 years, 292 days	2006, 2009	Bligh 2007–2012
—	No leader during this interim						
5	Steve Dickson	Buderim	23 January 2017	30 April 2019	2 years, 97 days	none	Palaszczuk 2015–2023
—	No leader during this interim						
6	James Ashby	—	20 September 2024	Incumbent	2 years, 60 days	2024	Miles 2023–2024
6	James Ashby	—	20 September 2024	Incumbent	2 years, 60 days	2024	Crisafulli 2024–present

=== Australian Capital Territory ===
#	Leader	Electorate	Term start	Term end	Time in office	Elections contested	Chief Minister (term)
1	Shaun Nelson	—	June 1997	December 1997	183 days	none	Carnell (1995–2000)
2	Chris Spence	—	December 1997	January 1998	31 days	none	Carnell (1995–2000)

== Members of Parliament ==
=== Current MPs ===
Seats in local government
- Brighton (Tas.): 1 / 9
- Clarence (Tas.): 1 / 12
- Lake Macquarie (NSW): 1 / 13
- Campbelltown (NSW): 1 / 15
- Cessnock (NSW): 1 / 13
- Baw Baw (Vic.): 1 / 9

==== Federal ====
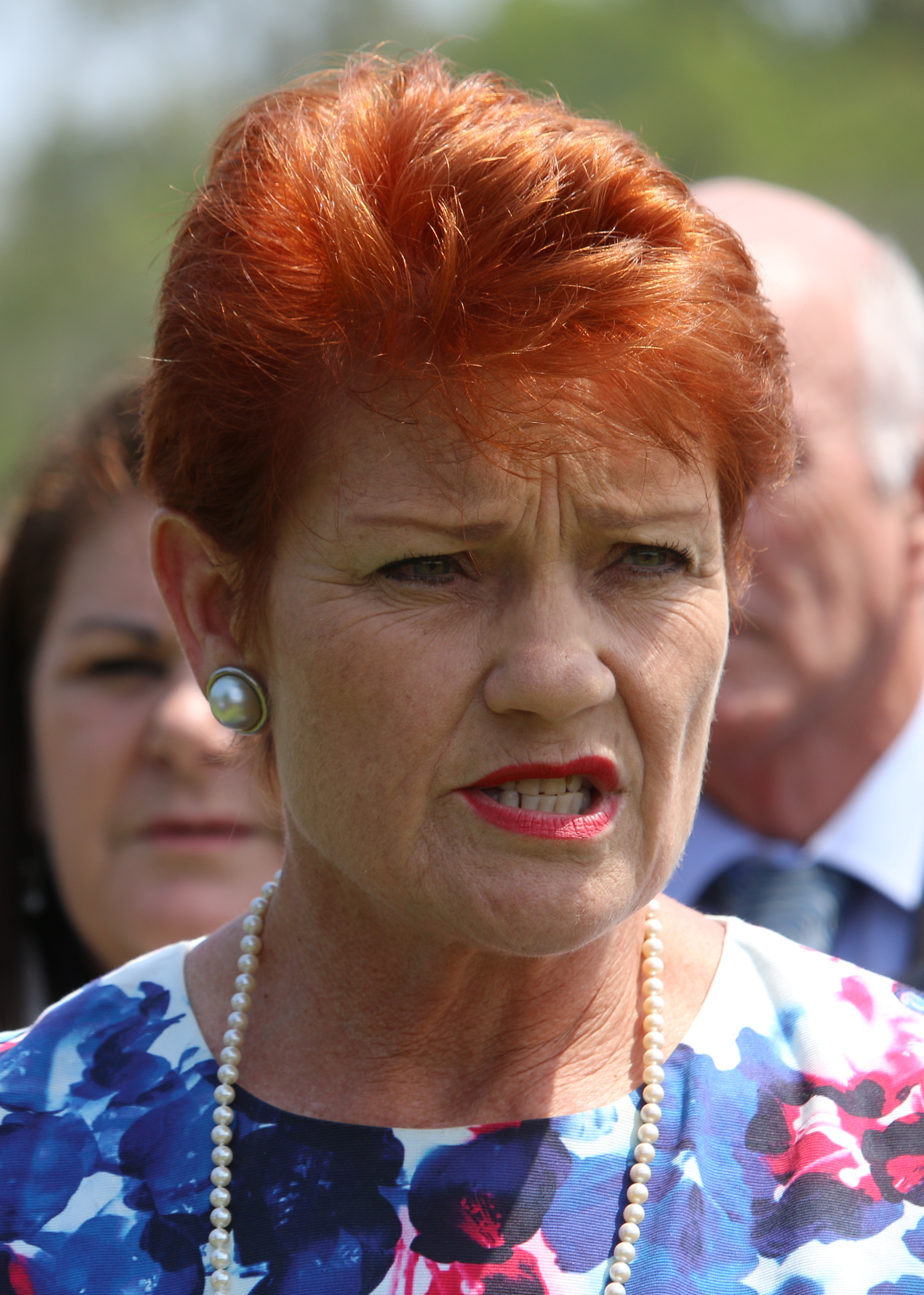
Senator Pauline Hanson (Qld.), 2016–present, MP for Oxley (1997–98)

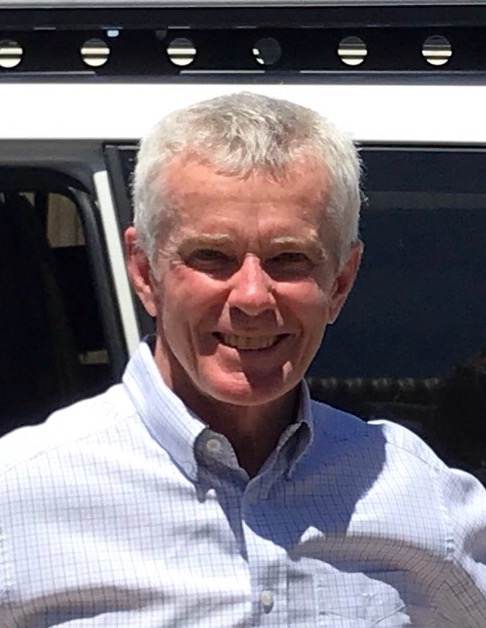
Senator Malcolm Roberts (Qld.), 2016–2017, 2019–present

Senator Sean Bell (NSW), 2025–present

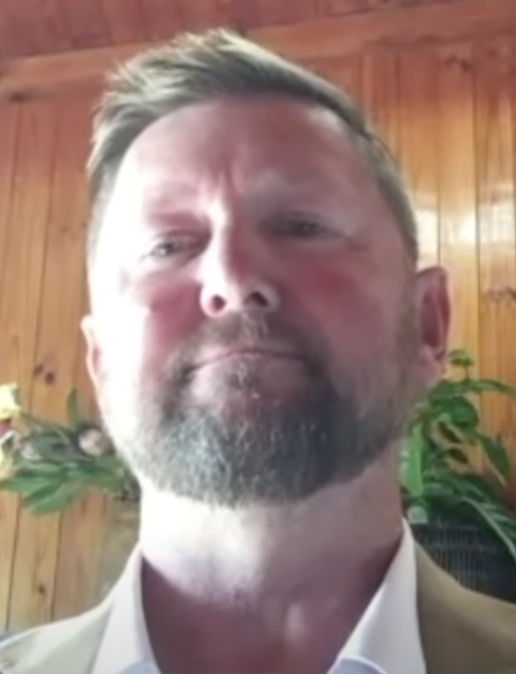
Senator Tyron Whitten (WA), 2025–present

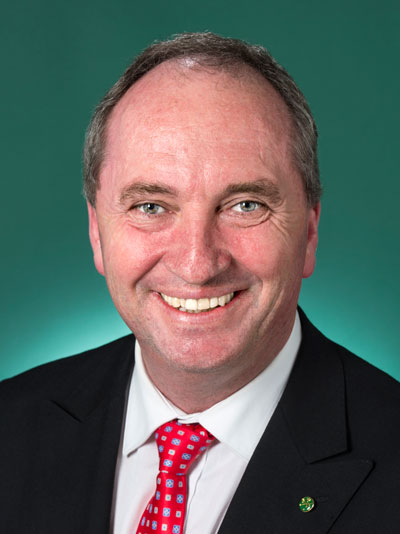
Barnaby Joyce MP (New England), 2025–present

David Farley MP (Farrer), 2026–present

==== South Australia ====
- Cory Bernardi MLC (2026–present)
- Carlos Quaremba MLC (2026–present)
- Rebecca Hewett MLC (2026–present)
- David Paton MP (Ngadjuri, 2026–present)
- Robert Roylance MP (Hammond, 2026–present)
- Jason Virgo MP (MacKillop, 2026–present)
- Chantelle Thomas MP (Narungga, 2026–present)

==== Victoria ====
- Rikkie-Lee Tyrrell MLC (Northern Victoria, 2022–present)

==== Western Australia ====
- Rod Caddies MLC (2025–present)
- Phil Scott MLC (2025–present)
- Luke Herdegen MLA (2026–present)

== See also ==
- Conservatism in Australia
- Personalist party, a type of political party centered on a charismatic political entrepreneur
- Pauline Hanson's Please Explain, a web series of political cartoons, hosted by One Nation
- Far-right politics in Australia
  - True Blue Crew, a far-right group whose members have been involved with One Nation
