= Muslim ban =

Muslim ban may refer to:

- Travel bans under the Trump administrations, various travel bans against people from certain Muslim-majority countries
  - Executive Order 13769, executive order restricting travel from certain Muslim countries implemented on January 27, 2017
- Muslim immigration ban
- Persecution of Muslims

== See also ==
- Anti-Islam (disambiguation)
