= Fire the Liar =

Australian political campaign

- Affiliation: One Nation
- Status: Active
- Key people: Pauline Hanson
- Receipts: Over AU $4 million (as of 16 June 2026)
- Slogan: Fire the Liar

Fire the Liar is an Australian political fundraising campaign organised by the far-right populist One Nation party, criticising the incumbent Labor Albanese government. The campaign began on 10 June 2026, and has raised AUD $4 million as of 16 June.

== Background ==
Since 2025, One Nation, under the leadership of far-right politician Pauline Hanson, has experienced rising favourability in opinion polls ahead of the next Australian federal election. In May 2026, the Australian Labor Party (ALP) ran advertisements across multiple social media platforms requesting its supporters donate between $10 to $27, to combat the 'rise of One Nation'.

One Nation's increased favourability in opinion polls has coincided with the ALP primary vote declining. This has been attributed to issues such as the cost of living, the housing crisis, and immigration. Additionally, the Albanese government has faced controversy over the 2026 Australian federal budget, particularly due to changes to capital gains tax and negative gearing, which contradicted statements made by Prime Minister Anthony Albanese during the 2025 election campaign.

Albanese stated that the government "changed our position" on the issues in response to accusations of lying.

One Nation's campaign came shortly after a similar campaign called "Ditch the Witch" targeted Victorian premier Jacinta Allan of the Labor Party. The campaign was condemned as "sexist" by several figures including former prime minister Julia Gillard, who experienced similar attacks during her tenure in government.

== The campaign ==
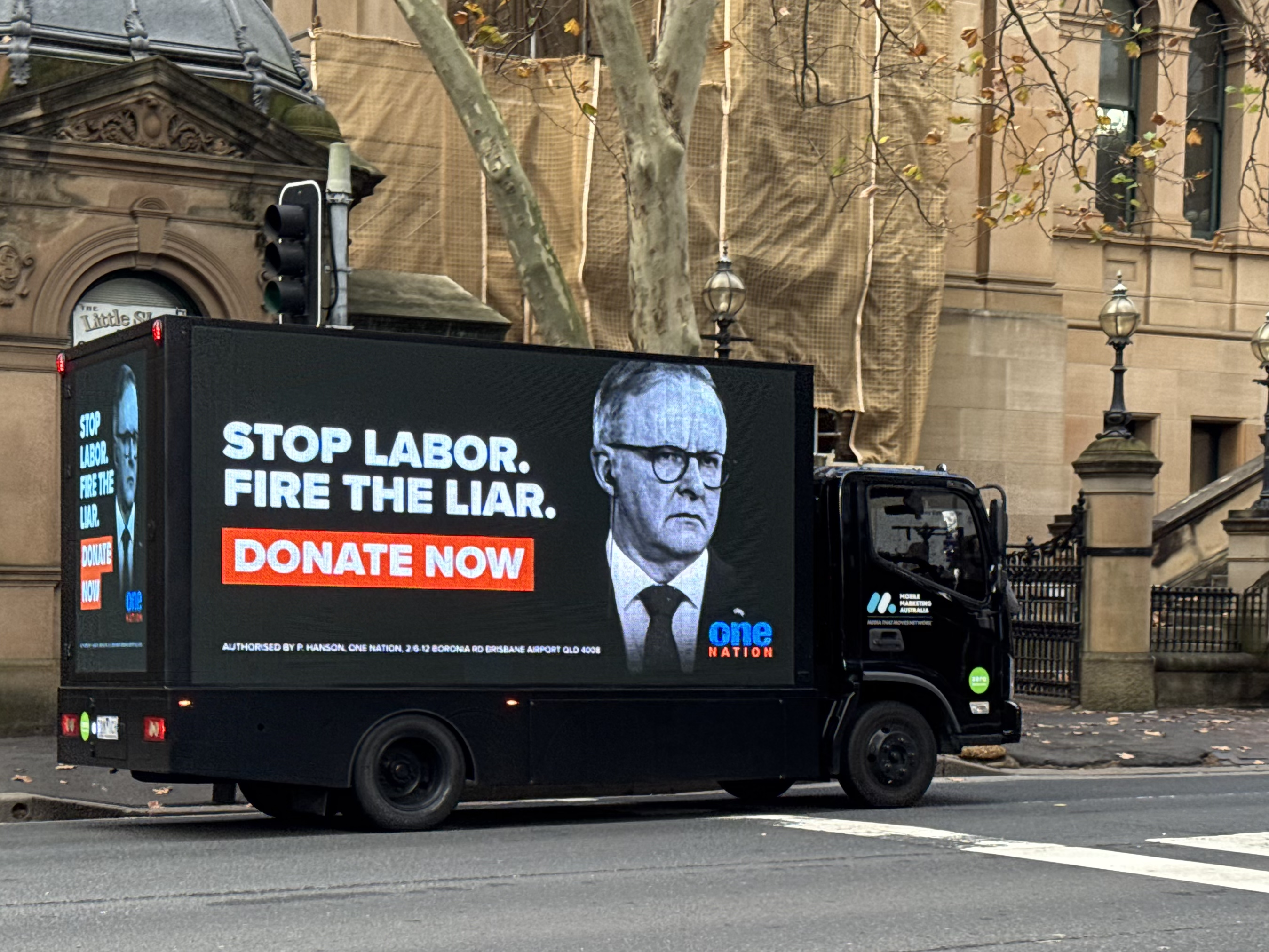
"Fire the Liar" advertisement on a truck driving along Macquarie Street, Sydney.

The campaign was officially launched on 10 June. One Nation asked its supporters for $29 donations via social media advertising to fund Fire the Liar, mirroring the ALP's social media campaign; despite Hanson previously criticising such fundraising methods as "disgusting." One Nation stated that the Fire the Liar campaign funds will be used on advertising material criticising the Labor government, in the form of billboards, radio and television advertisements. The campaign will target seats held by Labor, including safe seats such as Grayndler, Watson, and McMahon.

One Nation released a video narrated by Hanson for the campaign, claiming "mass migration" has caused the cost-of-living crisis, and that the government is infringing on the rights of citizens.

In August 2026, Hanson stated the money raised from Fire the Liar was "quarantined" until the next election.

== Reactions ==
=== Labor ===
"Did she though? Did she? What evidence is there?"

— Anthony Albanese, when informed of Hanson's Fire the Liar campaign raising over AUD $2 million, 15 June 2026

Albanese questioned the legitimacy of Hanson's claims that the campaign had raised millions of dollars, and accused One Nation of having the same policies as the Liberal-National Coalition. Health Minister Mark Butler suggested the amount of money raised for "Fire the Liar" was far less "in comparison to the money that One Nation receives from a billionaire like Gina Reinhart [sic]". Environment Minister Murray Watt accused One Nation of focusing on political attacks while ignoring the cost-of-living crisis. Agriculture Minister Julie Collins stated the government "took community sentiment seriously" and noted rising anti-establishment sentiment from the public.

=== Others ===
Sean Black, Hanson's former advisor, expressed apprehension over the 'Fire the Liar' name, and suggested that Hanson was "uncomfortable" discussing it in interviews.

National Party Senator Bridget McKenzie stated the campaign reflected voters' frustration with the Labor Party.

Michelle Grattan of The Conversation said that "The budget's broken promises help One Nation exploit public discontent and distrust, using its "Fire the Liar" slogan." The Guardian reported on the campaign's fundraising and related News Corp coverage.

== See also ==
- Anti-incumbency
