= Ian McAllister (political scientist) =

British-Australian academic

- Born: Ian McAllister; 2 December 1950 (age 75); Belfast, Northern Ireland, United Kingdom
- Citizenship: Australia, United Kingdom, Ireland
- Education: University of Strathclyde, Thames Polytechnic
- Occupations: Political scientist, professor
- Spouse: Dr Toni Makkai
- Website: http://politicsir.cass.anu.edu.au/people/academic-staff/ian-mcallister

Ian McAllister FASSA FRSE (born 2 December 1950, Belfast, United Kingdom) is the Distinguished Professor of political science at the Australian National University. He earned his PhD in political science in 1976 from University of Strathclyde. He is a leading election specialist with a research focus on Australian politics which involves co-directing the Australian Election Study, a national survey of political opinion conducted after each federal election since 1987 at the Australian National University. He is a leading scholar in individual level political survey research.

He was director of the ANU Research School of Social Sciences from 1997 to 2004. He has previously held chairs at the University of New South Wales and the University of Manchester and has held other academic appointments at The Queen's University of Belfast and the University of Strathclyde.

He was President of the British Politics Group 2001–2002, edited the Australian Journal of Political Science since 2004, and was chair of the Comparative Study of Electoral Systems project from 2003 to 2008. He is an Honorary Professor at the University of Aberdeen, a Fellow of the Academy of the Social Sciences in Australia and a Corresponding Fellow of the Royal Society of Edinburgh.

== Writings ==
The Australian Voter (2011) was concerned with how ordinary Australians vote. Specifically, it charts how the Australian voter has changed since the 1960s when academic surveys of voting first become available. It draws on 12 surveys a product mostly of the Australian Electoral Study from 1987 (a total of 9 surveys), but also the work from 1967 to 1979 is based on the Australian Political Attitudes Survey run by Donald Aitkin, Michael Kahan and Donald Stokes (a total of 3 surveys). It looks at the long term trends as a result of the changing electoral institutions party loyalties, trends in identification, the impact of education expansion, levels of political knowledge, the role of the mass media and to what extent political campaigns matter, social background and demography including gender, age and generation, religion, ethnicity and the urban-rural divide, the impact of class, economic beliefs, social values and political leadership at elections.

Ian McAllister has investigated Territorial Effects in British electoral geography. In 1992 he discovered a regional effect in British general elections by controlling for social compositional factors and constituency characteristics.

He has contributed significantly to the literature on postcommunist politics and the problems of democratisation with Stephen White at the University of Glasgow and Northern Ireland politics involve examining trends in public opinion and the relationship between social divisions and political cleavages.

== Prizes ==
Honorary Professor at the University of Aberdeen

== Bibliography ==
Danielle Chubb and Ian McAllister, Australian public opinion, defence and foreign policy: attitudes and trends since 1945, Palgrave Macmillan, 2021

Ian McAllister, The Australian Voter, University of New South Wales Press, Sydney, 2011

David M. Farrell and Ian McAllister, The Australian Electoral System: Origins, Variations and Consequences, University of New South Wales Press, Sydney, 2005

Ian McAllister, Steve Dowrick and Riaz Hassan, editors, The Cambridge Handbook of the Social Sciences in Australia, Cambridge University Press, Melbourne, 2004 (Winner, Australian Publishers' Association Award for Best Scholarly Reference Book, 2004).

David Lovell, Ian McAllister, Chandran Kukathas and William Maley, The Australian Political System Second edition, Longman, Melbourne, 1998

Stephen White, Richard Rose and Ian McAllister, How Russia Votes, Chatham House, Chatham, NJ, 1997

Ian McAllister, Malcolm Mackerras and Carolyn Brown Boldiston, Australian Political Facts, Second edition, Macmillan, Melbourne, 1997

Ian McAllister, Political Behaviour: Citizens, Parties and Elites in Australia, Longman Cheshire, Melbourne, 1992

Ian McAllister, Rhonda Moore and Toni Makkai, Drugs in Australian Society: Patterns, Attitudes and Policies, Longman Cheshire, Melbourne, 1991

Roger Jones and Ian McAllister, Migrant Unemployment and Labour Market Programs, Australian Government Publishing Service, Canberra, 1991

Richard Rose and Ian McAllister, The Loyalties of Voters: A Lifetime Learning Model, Sage Publications, London and Beverly Hills, Calif., 1990

Ian McAllister, Malcolm Mackerras, Alvaro Ascui and Sue Moss, Australian Political Facts, Longman Cheshire, Melbourne, 1990

Brian Graetz and Ian McAllister, Dimensions of Australian Society, Macmillan, Melbourne, 1988

Richard Rose and Ian McAllister. Voters Begin to Choose: From Closed Class to Open Elections in Britain, Sage Publications, London and Beverly Hills, Calif., 1986

Ian McAllister and Richard Rose, The Nation-Wide Competition for Votes: The British General Election of 1983, Frances Pinter, London and Columbia University Press, New York, 1984

Richard Rose and Ian McAllister, United Kingdom Facts, Macmillan, London and Holmes and Meier, New York, 1982

Ian McAllister, The Northern Ireland Social Democratic and Labour Party: Political Opposition in a Divided Society, Macmillan, London, 1977
