= Anti-Islam =

Anti-Islam or anti-Muslim may refer to:

- Criticism of Islam, criticism of the current or historical Islamic religion, its actions, teachings, omissions, structure, or nature
- Counter-jihad, a political current that views Islam as a threat to Western civilization
- Islamophobia, the prejudice against, hatred, or bigotry towards the religion of Islam and Muslims
- Persecution of Muslims, religious persecutions inflicted upon followers of the Islamic faith
- Sentiments which are a significant cause of Right-wing terrorism
- War on Islam controversy, a perceived campaign to harm, weaken or annihilate the societal system of Islam
